= George Bromley (politician) =

Member of the Parliament of England

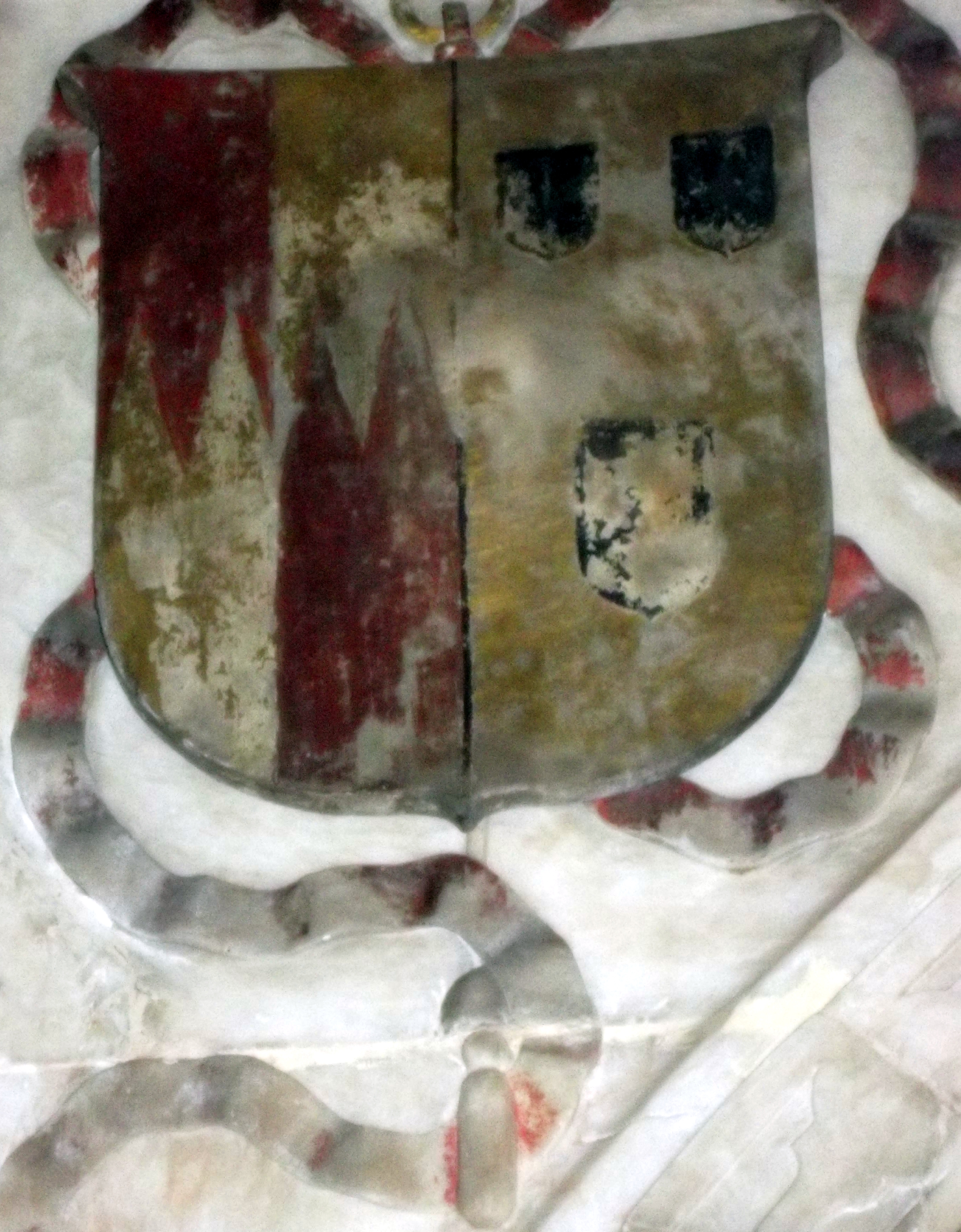
Arms of George Bromley.

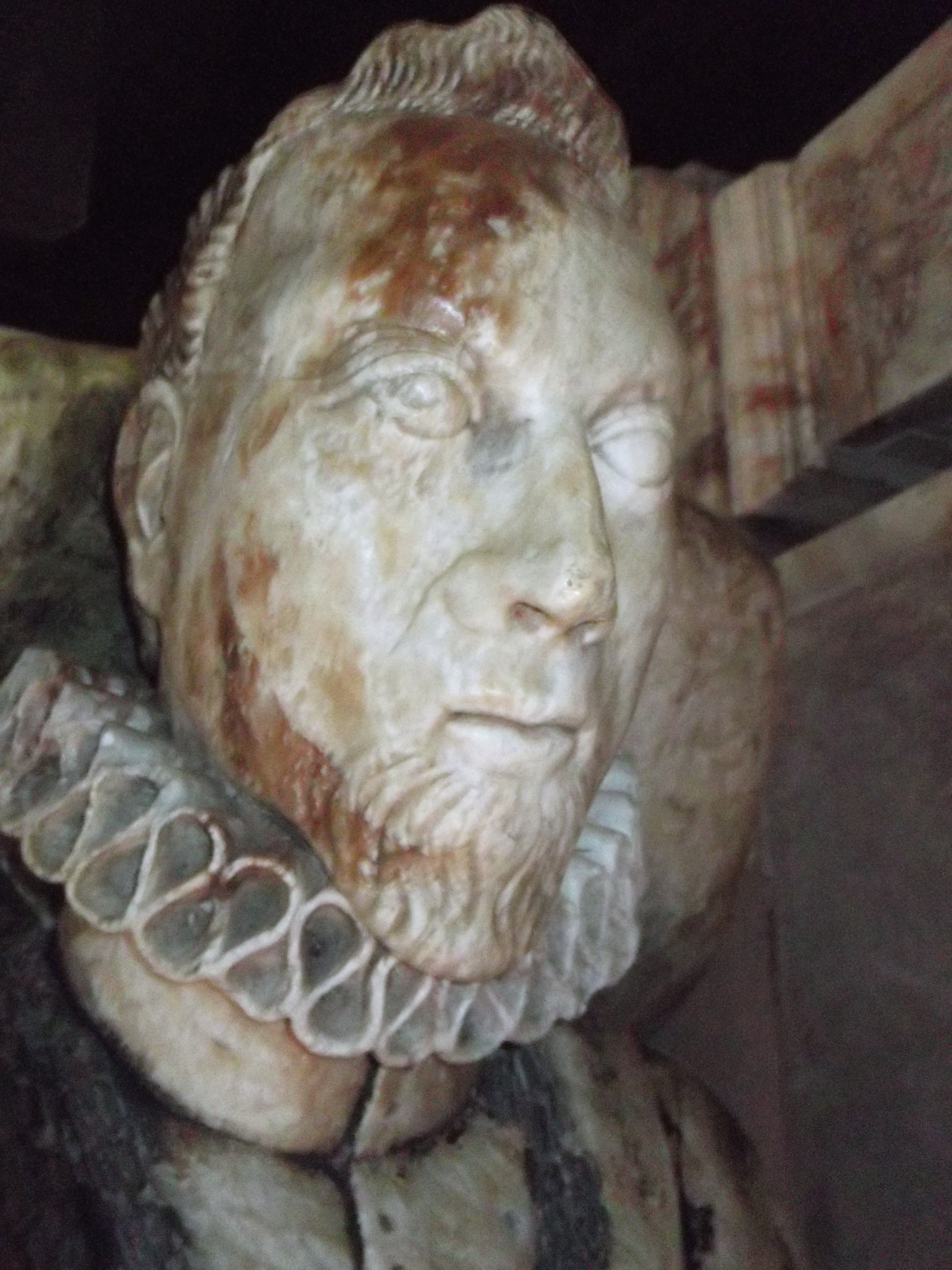
George Bromley, as depicted on his tomb in the church of St Peter the Apostle, Worfield, Shropshire. His epitaph describes him as "a Just man and a Great professor of the Religion now established."

George Bromley (ca. 1526–1589) was an English lawyer, landowner, politician and judge of the Mid-Tudor and Elizabethan period, a member of an important Shropshire legal and landed gentry dynasty. Although his career was overshadowed by that of his brother Thomas Bromley, George Bromley was of considerable importance in the affairs of the Welsh Marches and the Inner Temple. He was an MP for Liskeard 1563, Much Wenlock in 1558 and 1559 and Shropshire in 1571 and 1572.

== Background and early life ==
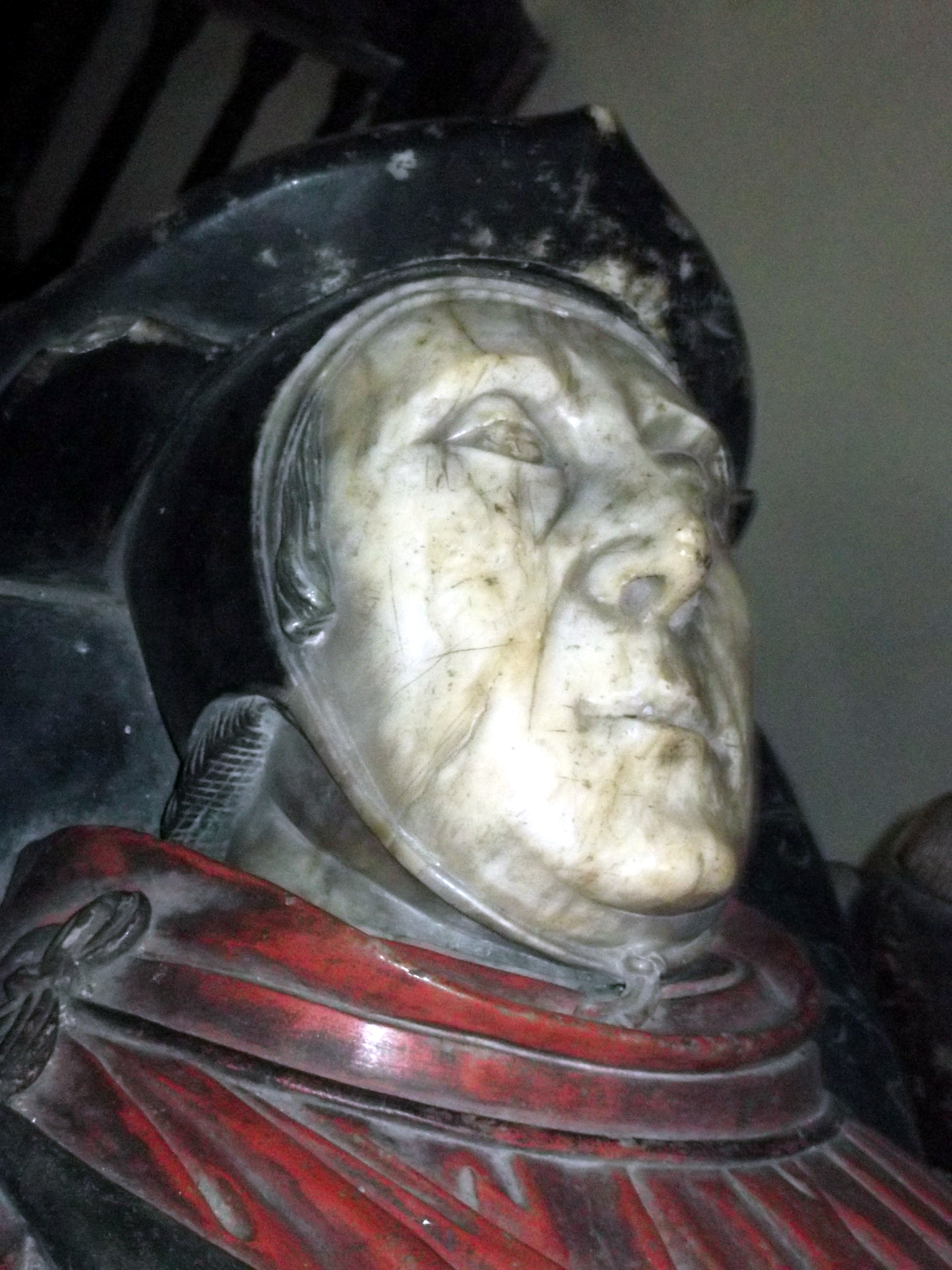
Effigy of Chief Justice Thomas Bromley, the cousin of Sir George Bromley's father, in St Andrew's Church, Wroxeter, Shropshire.

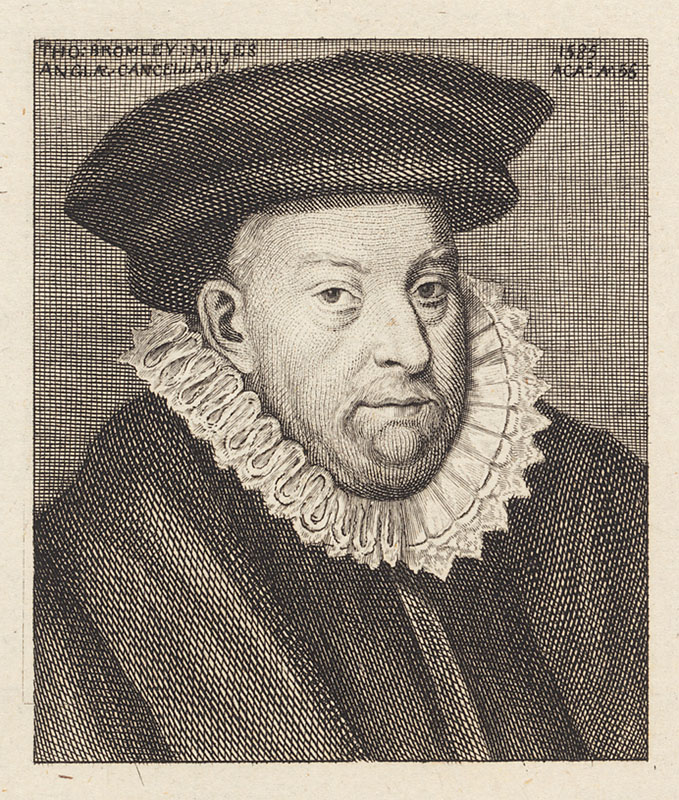
Sir Thomas Bromley, Sir George's younger brother, who became Lord Chancellor.

George Bromley was born around 1526. He was the first son of

- George Bromley of Hodnet, close to Market Drayton in Shropshire, the son of William Bromley of Mitley and Beatrix Hill.
- Jane Lacon, daughter of Sir Thomas Lacon of Willey, Shropshire.

The elder George Bromley was a prominent lawyer, important in the affairs of the Inner Temple, where he was Autumn Reader for 1508 and Lent Reader for 1509, although he refused the honour for Lent 1515. He was also recorder (judge) of Shrewsbury. His younger cousin, Thomas Bromley, also served as recorder of Shrewsbury and was made Chief Justice of the King's Bench by Mary I. The cousins both exercised considerable power regionally as legal officers of the Council in the Marches of Wales, which embodied the power of central government in this still-turbulent region.

The young George Bromley was left without a father in 1533 and must have undergone a protracted, wardship but nothing is known of it. It was possibly ameliorated by the influence of his father's cousin, Chief Justice Thomas Bromley.

=== Family tree: the Bromley dynasty ===
Based primarily on the Heraldic Visitations of Shropshire and Cheshire, with assistance from the History of Parliament Online, the family tree illustrates Thomas Bromley's relationship to the rest of the Bromley dynasty and to their main allies, the Hill, Corbet and Newport families, c. 1450–1650.

David Browe of Malpas, Cheshire	Jane Mitley	Roger Bromley of Mitley
Humphrey Hill of Blore and Buntingsdale	Agnes, daughter and coheiress of John Bird of Charlton, Shropshire, granddaughter and heiress of David of Malpas	Unknown, daughter and coheiress of David Browe	Roger Bromley of Mitley
Thomas Hill	Margaret Wilbraham of Woodhey, near Faddiley, Cheshire	Beatrix Hill	William Bromley of Mitley	Roger Bromley	Jane Jennings of Walliborne Hall, Church Pulverbatch
Sir Rowland Hill (died 1561), of London and Hodnet, Lord Mayor of London	Joanna Hill	John Gratewood	George Bromley of Hodnet, High Sheriff of Shropshire 1521-2	Jane Lacon of Willey, Shropshire	Elizabeth Dodd of Cloverley, near Calverhall, Shropshire	Thomas Bromley (chief justice) (died 1555) of Eyton on Severn, Wroxeter and Shrewsbury, Chief Justice of the Queen's Bench	Isabel Lyster of Rowton
Reginald Corbet (died 1566) of Adderley and Stoke upon Tern, MP for Much Wenlock and Shrewsbury, Justice of the King's Bench	Alice Gratewood, co-heiress of Sir Rowland Hill	Thomas Bromley (1530–87), of Rodd Castle and Hodnet, MP for Bridgnorth, Wigan and Guildford, Lord Chancellor	Elizabeth Fortescue of Shirburn, Oxfordshire	SIR GEORGE BROMLEY (c.1526–89), of Hallon in Worfield, MP for Much Wenlock, Liskeard and Shropshire	Jane Waverton of Worfield	Margaret Bromley	Sir Richard Newport (died 1570) of High Ercall, MP for Shropshire
Richard Corbet	Anne Bromley	Elizabeth Bromley	Sir Oliver Cromwell (died 1655) of Hinchingbrooke House and Ramsey Abbey, MP for Huntingdonshire	Sir Henry Bromley (c.1560–1615), of Holt Castle and Shrawardine Castle, MP for Plymouth, Worcestershire and Shropshire	Francis Bromley (c.1556–91), of Hodnet, MP for Shropshire	Sir Edward Bromley (1563–1626), of Shifnall Grange and Bridgnorth, Baron of the Exchequer, MP for Bridgnorth	Francis Newport, MP for Shropshire

== Landowner ==
The Bromleys were a landed gentry family in a county without a resident aristocracy and dominated throughout the century by the gentry. However, their estates were not large: their wealth came from their use of their education and contacts to tap into the opportunities for enrichment offered by the State, both national and local. George Bromley was the heir to the family estates, the most substantial at Hawkstone, near Hodnet, where they lived cheek by jowl with the Hills, their closest allies. George also had land at Wistanswick, a few miles east of Hodnet, at Allerton, and elsewhere in Shropshire.

However, Bromley made a strategic marriage to Joan Waverton, heiress to the estate of Hallon, in the parish of Worfield, east of Bridgnorth. Hallon, also rendered Hawne, which represents its pronunciation more effectively, lay to the south-west of Worfield village. Bromley made it his home and it was passed on to his heirs. However, his granddaughter, Jane, daughter of Francis Bromley, married into the Davenport family, allegedly after a secret courtship. An extremely protracted legal battle left Hallon in the hands of the Davenports and the seat of the Bromleys was replaced by Davenport House, although Hallon remains as a local toponym and street name.

== Legal training and career at Inner Temple ==
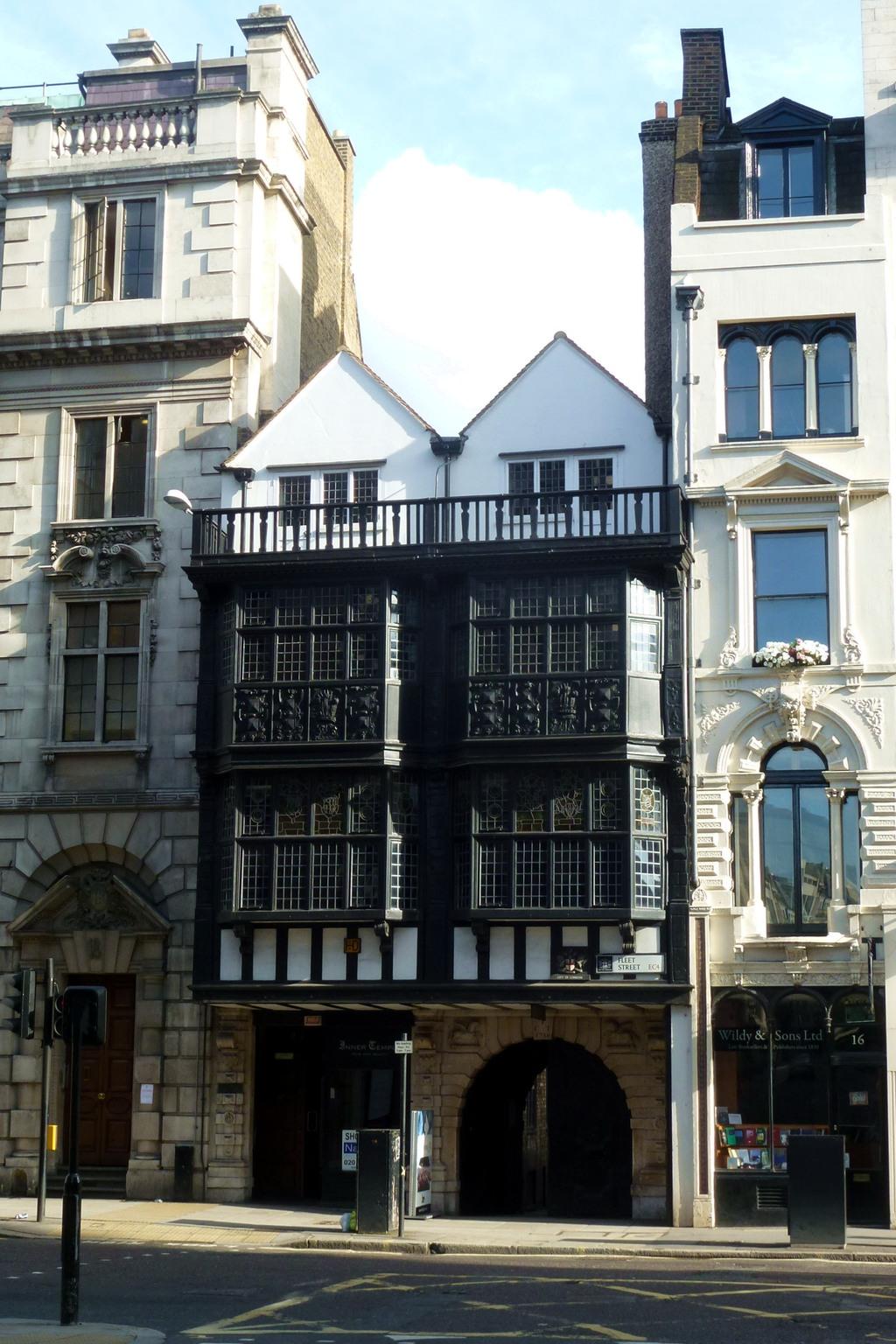
Fleet Street entrance to the Inner Temple

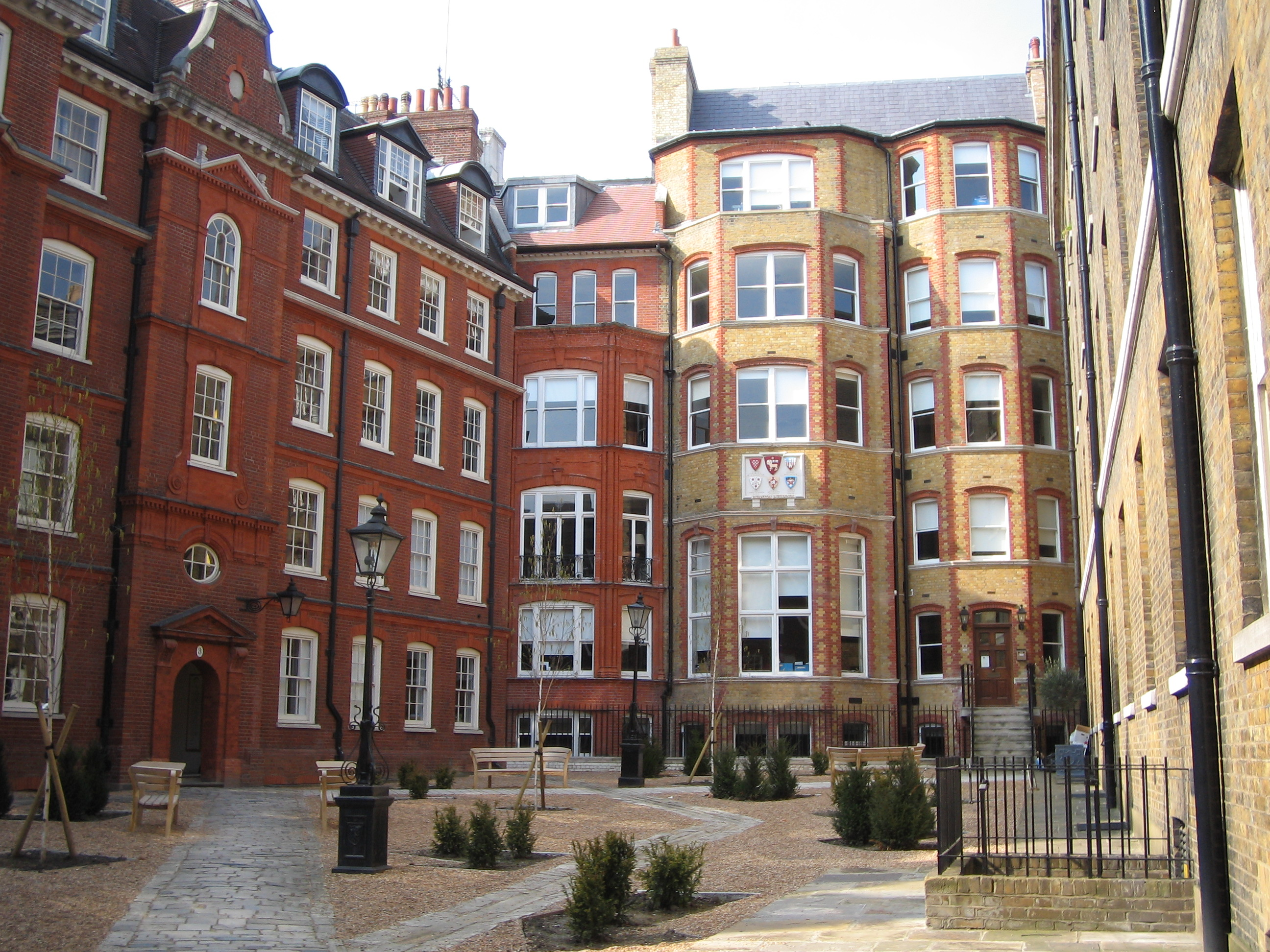
Hare Court today

The chief justice probably influenced also the legal training of his cousins once removed: certainly he left a small annuity as a bequest to encourage George's younger brother, the future Lord Chancellor, to continue his legal studies. George himself was trained at the Inner Temple and called to the bar, followed a few years later by his brother, Thomas.

The Inn gradually entrusted George with posts of honour and authority, beginning with ceremonial functions, like steward to the reader's dinner in 1555 and for the Lent vacation in 1556. The followed more responsible posts: he was appointed auditor to the steward of the Inn in November 1556 and surveyor of the Inn's church in the summer of 1558. With the new reign, his career at the Inn, as in other respects, immediately accelerated. He was made a bencher by a resolution of the Inn's parliament on 23 April 1559, along with William Rothewood and Richard Onslow, another successful Shropshire lawyer-politician and a noted Puritan. Bromley's first appearance as a bencher at the parliament of the Inn was recorded as 2 October 1559, although the sequence suggests that this is a mistake for All Souls' Day, 2 November, one of the customary days for the parliament. His attendance at parliament thereafter was very frequent, although from February 1563, when Thomas first appeared as a bencher, the brothers more often alternated than attended together.

Further honours now followed rapidly. A parliament on 4 May 1561 appointed Bromley Autumn Reader for the year. and a year later, in recognition of his discharge of the office, he was allowed to make a special admission to the inn of Edward Caryll, a member of a well-known recusant family from Sussex. On 3 November 1567 Bromley was elected treasurer of the Inn. It appears that Bromley, like his brother some years later, clamped down on debt and dereliction of duty to steady the Inn's shaky finances. Later in the month parliament decreed penalties for those who were more than 40 shillings in arrears. Officials who failed to perform their duties at Christmas were fined £5 – a large sum. In the summer of 1568 debtors were warned that they faced loss of their chambers if they failed to pay within three months. The new regime seems to have met with the approval of most, as exactly a year after he was first elected, Bromley was re-elected treasurer and appointed Lent Reader for 1569 Soon he was extracting large sums of £20 and £40 from members to commute future fees and duties, while the precise fees for admissions were reasserted and minuted. Bromley was evidently elected for a third term, as he attended parliament as treasurer until he was replaced by Francis Gawdy on 2 November 1570.

Elizabeth's ministers had long been concerned about Catholic influence in the legal profession and had sought to exclude recusants from the Inns of Court from 1569. Bromley and Edward Flowerdew were given the task of compiling a return of suspected recusants at the inner Temple in 1577. This they did with great thoroughness, returning 59 names, carefully classified according to presumed levels of complicity.

Bromley retained a chamber at the Inner Temple until his death. It was situated in an area known as Mr. Hare's Court, as Hugh Hare had long had a study on the upper floor. The chamber had been restored to use after it had fallen into decay by William Towse, who was allowed to share it with Bromley for life.

== Political and judicial career ==
=== Early parliamentary career ===
Bromley was a made a Steward of crown lands in Shropshire by March 1554, perhaps by Queen Mary and was from the outset of his career committed to a power base in his own county of Shropshire. He was elected MP for Much Wenlock in the last parliament of Mary's reign, which assembled on 23 January 1558 and lasted until the succession of Elizabeth brought about its dissolution on 17 November. Sir George Blount was the other MP, elected ahead of Bromley in order of precedence, while Thomas Bromley was elected for Bridgnorth.

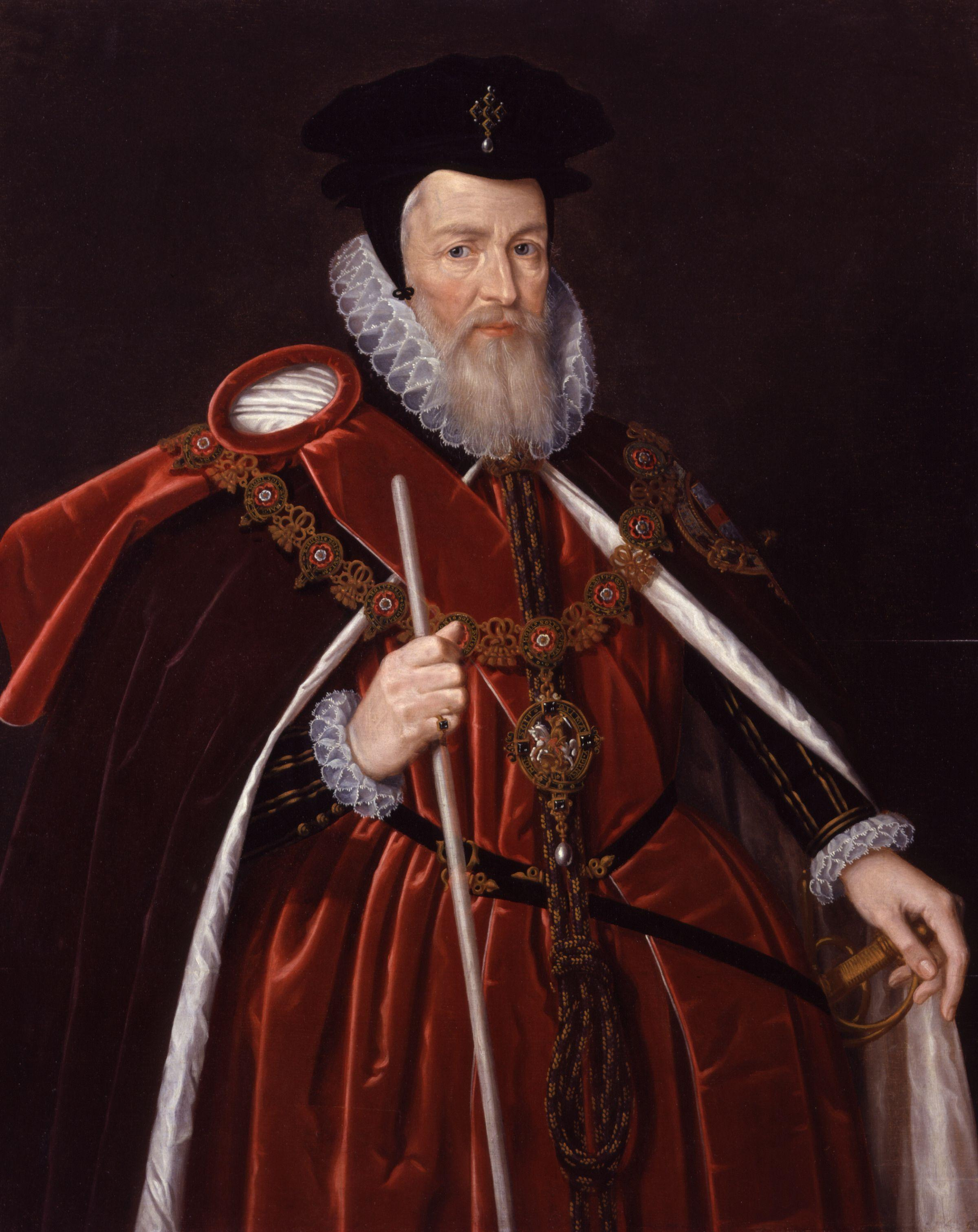
William Cecil, 1st Baron Burghley, Elizabeth's closest adviser and an early patron of the Bromley brothers.

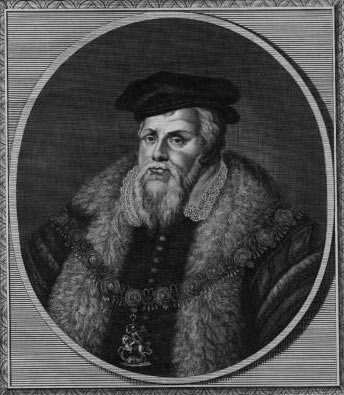
Francis Russell, 2nd Earl of Bedford, another important court contact and powerful in Cornwall as Lord Warden of the Stannaries.

The brothers were favoured by the great influence of their relatives. Their mother's family, the Lacons, exercised considerable sway in the Shropshire borough elections. At Much Wenlock the contracting parties to the election were the High Sheriff of Shropshire, the town's bailiff and the bugesses, the sheriff being Richard Newport, who was married to their second cousin, Margaret, the daughter of the late Chief Justice Thomas Bromley. George was elected to the next parliament, the first of Elizabeth's reign, on 19 January 1559, again for Much Wenlock: this time his colleague was Roland Lacon, who was his first cousin and Blount's uncle.

Bromley was also elected to the following parliament, which assembled in January 1563. This time he seems to have relied on powerful court connections which he shared with his brother: specifically Francis Russell, 2nd Earl of Bedford, and Lord Burleigh, the queen's closest adviser. They had great influence over the return of MPs for the borough of Liskeard in Cornwall, where Bedford was Lord Warden of the Stannaries. Bromley was returned alongside a local gentry politician, Reginald Mohun.

=== Judicial and administrative preferment ===
However, in Elizabeth's reign he was appointed to a series of important posts in both the judiciary and in civic authority. A member of the Council in the Marches of Wales, he was appointed Justice of the Peace successively in counties across the border country and West Midlands: Shropshire, Cheshire, Denbighshire and Warwickshire. In 1564 the bishops were asked by the Privy Council to report on the suitability and religious reliability of the local magistrates. For Shropshire, Thomas Bentham, the Bishop of Lichfield and Coventry, Bromley's good standing as a Protestant and commented:

I know the learning of none muche reported, but of Justice Corbet, and George Bramley.

With such episcopal approval, his promotion was swift. From 1566 to 1580 he was Attorney-General of the Duchy of Lancaster 1566–80, a post of great power and patronage, especially in the north-west of England, although the duchy had land and employees all over the country. He became an ecclesiastical commissioner in 1572. By 1574 he was Custos rotulorum of Shropshire, the senior civil authority in the county. After serving as justice of the Anglesey circuit from 1567–80, he was appointed justice of Chester in May 1580. Thereafter he collected at least three recorderships: at Worcester, Shrewsbury and Bridgnorth by 1583.

=== The Council in the Marches ===
The Book of Common Prayer

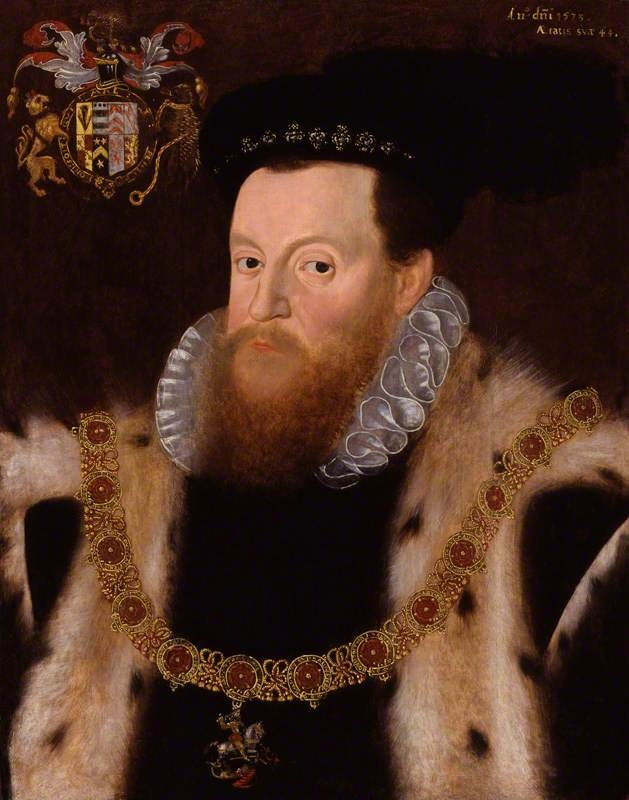
Sir Henry Sidney

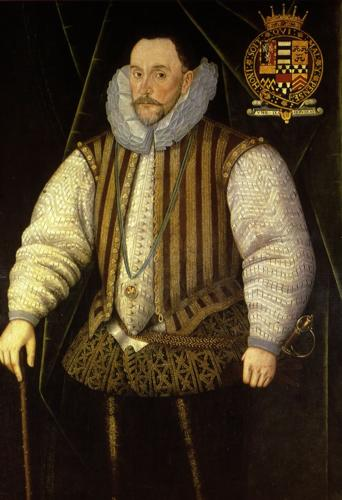
Henry Herbert, 2nd Earl of Pembroke

Bromley was a member of the Council in the Marches of Wales by 1560, but may have been appointed considerably earlier. It was the main organ of the state not only in most of Wales but also in the neighbouring counties of England and even Worcestershire, and for 26 years from 1560 its president was Sir Henry Sidney, a pillar of the Protestant establishment and brother-in-law of Robert Dudley, 1st Earl of Leicester, the queen's favourite. Bromley the chief legal official of the council, receiving the substantial salary of £200 per annum.

Bromley was sometimes given tasks beyond his remit as a legal officer: in 1569, for example, he was one of those named as responsible for the official store of arms and ammunition in Merionethshire. Frequently he was involved in the imposition of the Elizabethan religious settlement, a role he took on also at the Inner Temple. In 1573 he was appointed to a commission of oyer and terminer with the task of imposing the Act of Uniformity 1558, which made it mandatory for everyone to worship regularly in their parish church according to the Book of Common Prayer. In 1577 he was appointed to another commission of oyer and terminer on the death of the assize judges.

Like other council members, Bromley was reputed for his attention to justice, especially to speed and fairness to the poor. In November 1580 Bromley and Henry Townshend, the MP for Bridgnorth, and Justice of Chester, wrote to Thomas Bromley, now Lord Chancellor, asking him to intervene against one John Hughes, who was using vexatious tactics against 17 poor men of the region, deliberately taking up residence in Westminster and suing them in the capital. Bromley and Townshent pointed out that Hughes had already acquired a reputation as a litigious nuisance in Montgomeryshire. Next month, Bromley was appointed to the Denbighshire commission for musters, the body responsible for raising troops in the county: in this case extremely detailed instructions were given to ensure that all eligible men were available and equipped. The council was proud of its efficiency as well as its relative freedom from corruption. In January 1581 Bromley and Sidney raised by 50% the pay of the clockkeeper at Ludlow Castle, where the council generally met, because of his diligence. In 1586, on the death of Sidney, Bromley took the leadership of the council until a new appointment, Henry Herbert, 2nd Earl of Pembroke, could take over.

=== MP for Shropshire ===
Bromley was elected knight of the shire for Shropshire in 1571, second to the Catholic landowner Sir George Blount, as he had been at Much Wenlock at the very beginning of his political career. Despite his religious views, Blount was known to be entirely loyal to Elizabeth and her government. However, these were turbulent times, with rebellion and plots constantly in the air. The Privy Council had written on the queen's behalf to reliable Protestant agents in each county to secure careful vetting of candidates, in Shropshire selecting Sir Andrew Corbet. Corbet had certainly written to the bailiffs at Shrewsbury, urging them to consider "hie Grace's sayde letters to the accomplishment off hie highness playsyer theryn," and probably in similar terms to other returning officers and contracting parties. He exercised a veto over parliamentary nominations throughout the county in 1571 and 1572. Bromley was elected again in 1572, this time taking the senior seat over George Mainwaring. Bromley would have been well-known to Corbet through their work together for the Council in the Marches. They were seen together in public on many occasions, and were feasted together at a cost of £2 1s. 6d. by Shrewsbury council in 1573.

By now a reputable lawyer, Bromley was given considerable responsibility, mainly within his own areas of interest and expertise and also in important matters of State and Church. In 1571 he sat on a committee concerning Papal bulls, considering what became the Bulls, etc., from Rome Act 1570. He attended a conference with the House of Lords on the treasons bill that was to issue in the Rebellion Act 1572 and another on the 12 shires of Wales. In 1572 Bromley served on two different committees considering the problem of the captive Mary Queen of Scots. He was also on a committee concerned with the restoration of title and lands to Reginald Grey, 5th Earl of Kent. Another of his committees dealt with a bill to restore the finances of Tonbridge School, which had almost lost its buildings and land because its endowment by Henry Fisher of the Worshipful Company of Skinners was challenged by his descendants.

After its brief 1572 session, Parliament did not assemble again until 1576. In February Bromley helped question Peter Wentworth, the Puritan MP for Tregony. Wentworth had delivered a speech in which he declared that "in this House which is termed a place of free speech there is nothing so necessary for the preservation of the prince and state as free speech, and without it it is a scorn and mockery to call it a Parliament house," and had gone on explicitly to criticise the queen for attempting to influence proceedings. As a result of the committee's examination, he was committed to the Tower of London and only released for the end of the session. Later that month Bromley helped investigate the case of Arthur Hall, who was using parliamentary privilege to avoid paying damages of £100 in compensation for an injury inflicted by one of his servants on Melchisedech Mallory during a brawl over a dice game in St Paul's churchyard. Bromley reported back to the House on developments and ultimately the House of Commons asserted for the first time its right to discipline as well as protect members and their staff.

Parliament was not called again until 1584 and on that occasion Bromley was able to get his eldest son, Francis Bromley, elected MP for Shropshire.

=== Justice and recorder ===
Bromley's appointment as Justice of Chester in May 1580 was apparently through the influence of Burleigh himself. He joined Henry Townshend, who had been appointed a year before, and replaced Sir John Throckmorton, who had recently died after falling into disgrace a year earlier for giving judgment in favour of a relative. The month after his appointment at Chester, Bromley was knighted.

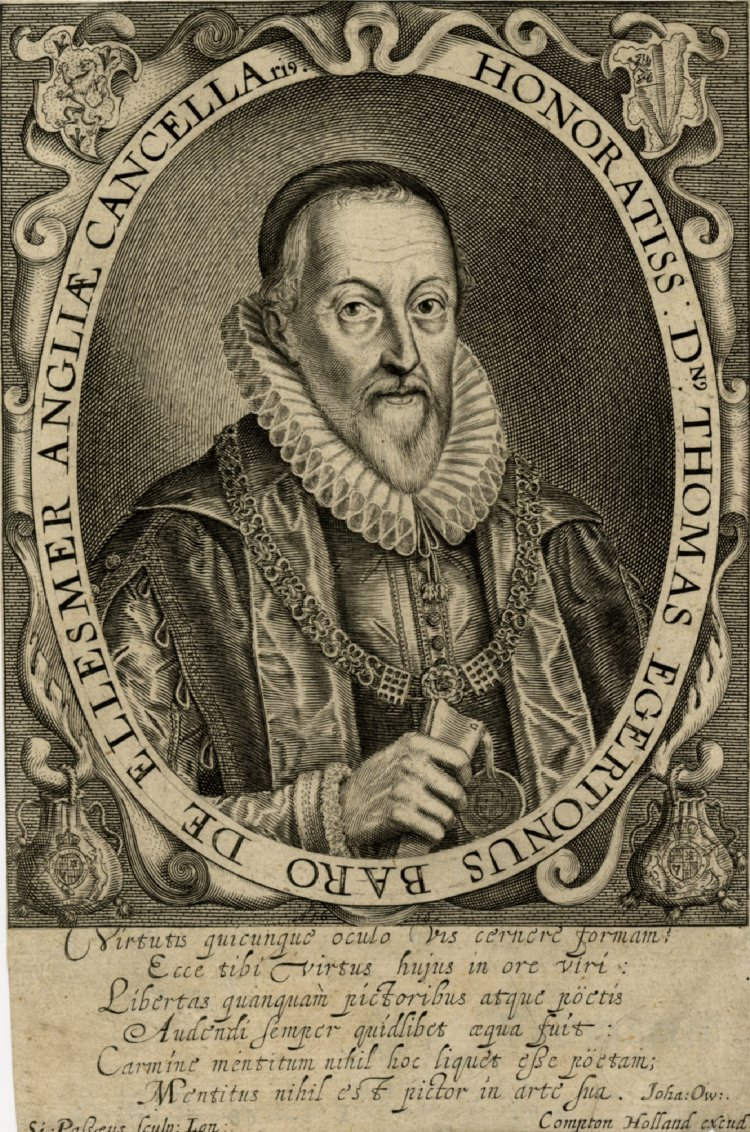
Thomas Egerton

In May 1582 Bromley intervened in the case of the aged Lady Mary Egerton of Ridley, Cheshire, who was accused of recusancy. His attention was probably drawn to this by her husband's illegitimate son, Thomas Egerton, already a distinguished lawyer and a future Lord Chancellor. Bromley wrote to William Chaderton, the Bishop of Chester, and Sir Henry Stanley, asking them to delay proceedings against her for three months and telling them he had "good hope of conformitie in her." He seems to have pulled his more powerful connections into the campaign, for his brother Thomas, the Lord Chancellor, sent a supporting letter in July and Sir Christopher Hatton did the same in January 1583.

Bromley was far less sympathetic or lenient in the Recusancy case of Richard Gwyn, a Welsh Bard and schoolmaster from Wrexham. Beginning in May 1581, Sir George Bromley took a leading role in Gwyn's four year long imprisonment and interrogation under torture. Bromley also led the panel of judges that tried Gwyn at Wrexham for high treason in October 1584 and sentenced him to death by hanging, drawing, and quartering. Despite Gwyn's repeated insistence that he viewed Elizabeth I as the lawful Queen of England, just not as the Head of the Church, Gwyn's sentence was carried out in the Beast Market of Wrexham on 15 October 1584. The canonization ceremony for St. Richard Gwyn by Pope Paul VI took place as part of that for the Forty Martyrs of England and Wales at Rome on 25 October 1970.

In 1585 Bromley felt compelled to write to the mayor and sheriffs of Chester to complain about the very poor quality of board and lodging they afforded him. He probably had fewer complaints about Shrewsbury, where he was elected recorder in June 1580, admittedly at a fee of only £4 per annum. Even before his appointment, he had advised and drafted ordinances for Shrewsbury School, assuring the headmaster, Thomas Ashton that earlier charters did not prevent him setting aside funds for university scholarships. In August 1581, when his son Francis married Joyce Leighton, daughter of Edward Leighton, the council decided make a gift to each father valued at £5, in goods of their choice, and to make a gift even to George Bromley's nephew, Henry, who was attending the event. The council must have valued Bromley highly, as in 1582 they gave him a considerable say in the financing and payment of a public preacher at St Mary's Church. The Puritan Edward Bulkeley was retiring and was replaced by the even more radical iconoclast, John Tomkys. However, Bromley's responsibilities were now heavy and varied. At Bridgnorth, where he was also recorder, he had to install a deputy from 1586, when he was forced to take up leadership of the Council in the Marches.

== Death ==
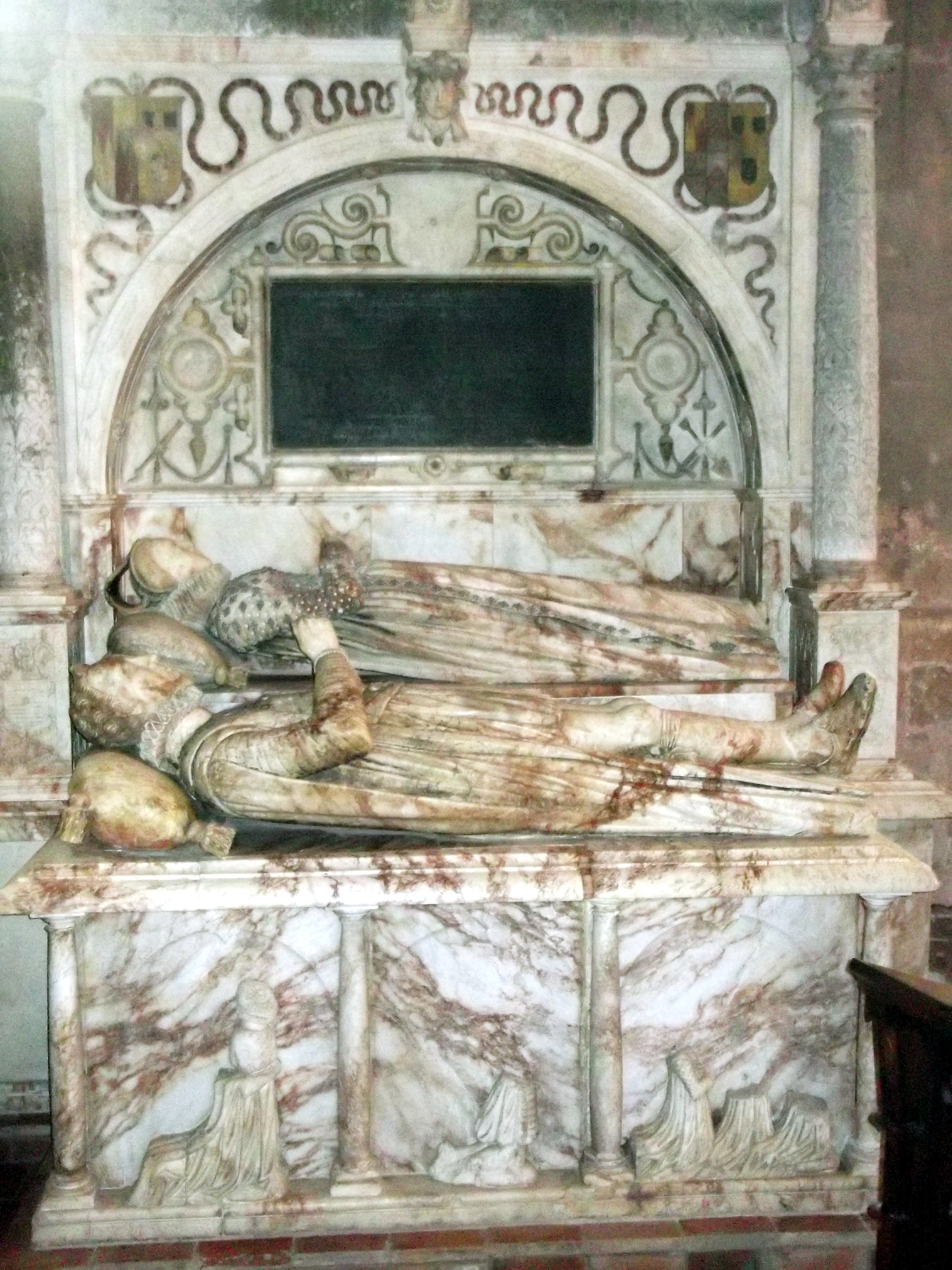
Tomb of George Bromley and Joan Waverton.

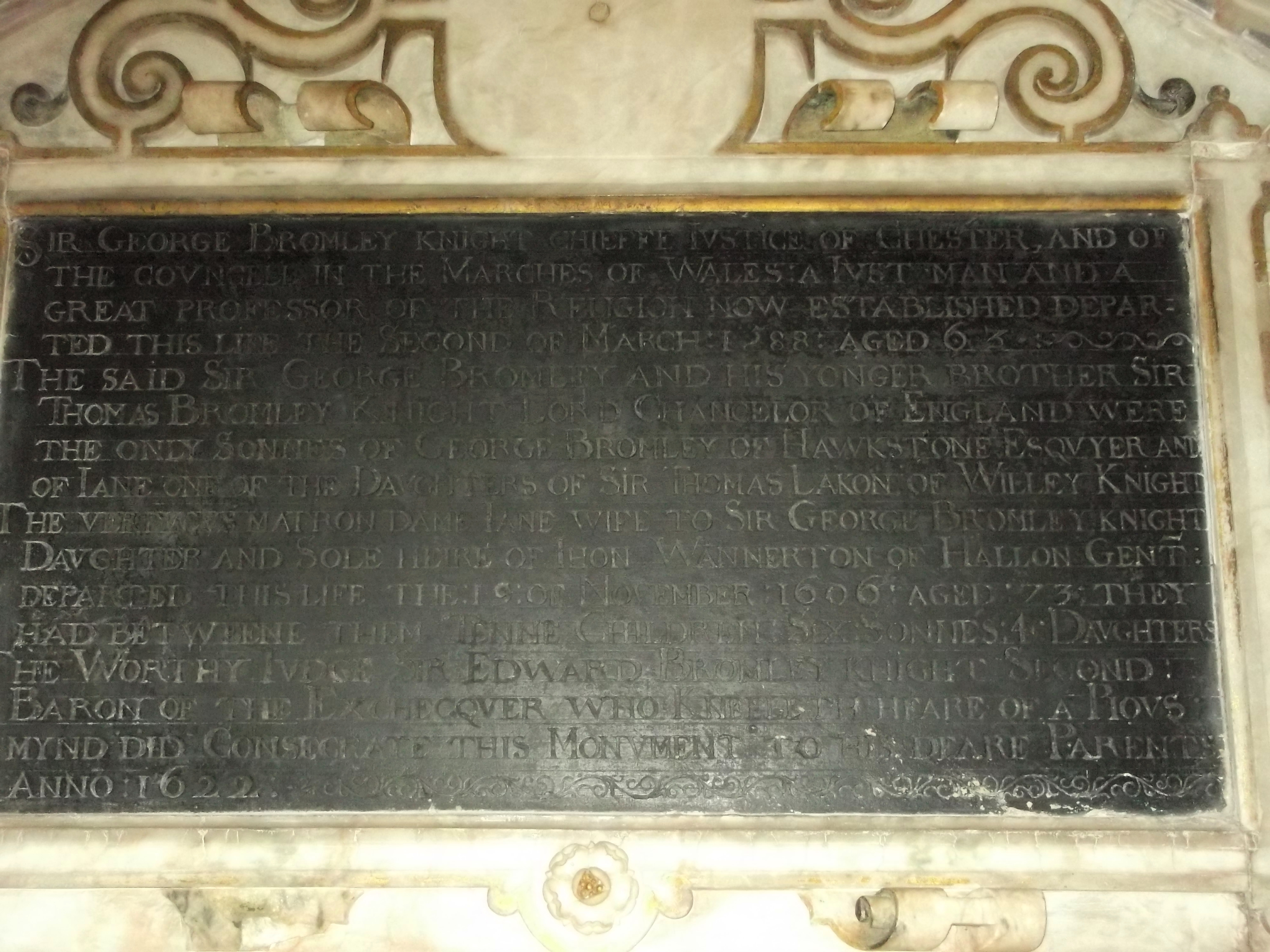
Epitaph of George Bromley.

Bromley died on 2 March 1589. He was interred in St Peter's church at Worfield. His second son, Edward, had an impressive altar tomb constructed for George Bromley and Joan Waverton, bearing their effigies. The epitaph he composed reads:

Sir George Bromley, Knight, Chiefi'e Justice of Chester, and of The Covncell in the Marches of Wales : a Jvst man and a Great professor of the Religion now established, departed this life the second of March 1588, Aged 63. The said Sir George Bromley and his younger Brother, Sir Thomas Bromley, Knight, Lord Chancelor of England, were the only sonnes of George Bromley, of Hawkstone, Esqvier, and of Jane, one of the Davghters of Sir Thomas Lakon, of Willey, Knight.
The vertuous matron, Dame Jane, wife to Sir George Bromley, Knight, Daughter and sole Heire of JOHN WANNERTON, of Hallon, Gent., Departed this life 19 November 1606, Aged 73. They Had betweene them Tenne children, sixe sonnes : 4 Davghters. The worthy Judge, Sir Edward Bromley, Knight, second Baron of the Excheqver, who Kneeleth Here, of a Pious mynd did consecrate This monument to his dear Parents.
Anno 1622.

The tomb stood at the east end of the north aisle, together with Edward's own tomb. The church underwent a major restoration in 1861-2 and the Bromley tombs were moved further west in 1866 to improve the space for congregational worship.

== Marriage and family ==
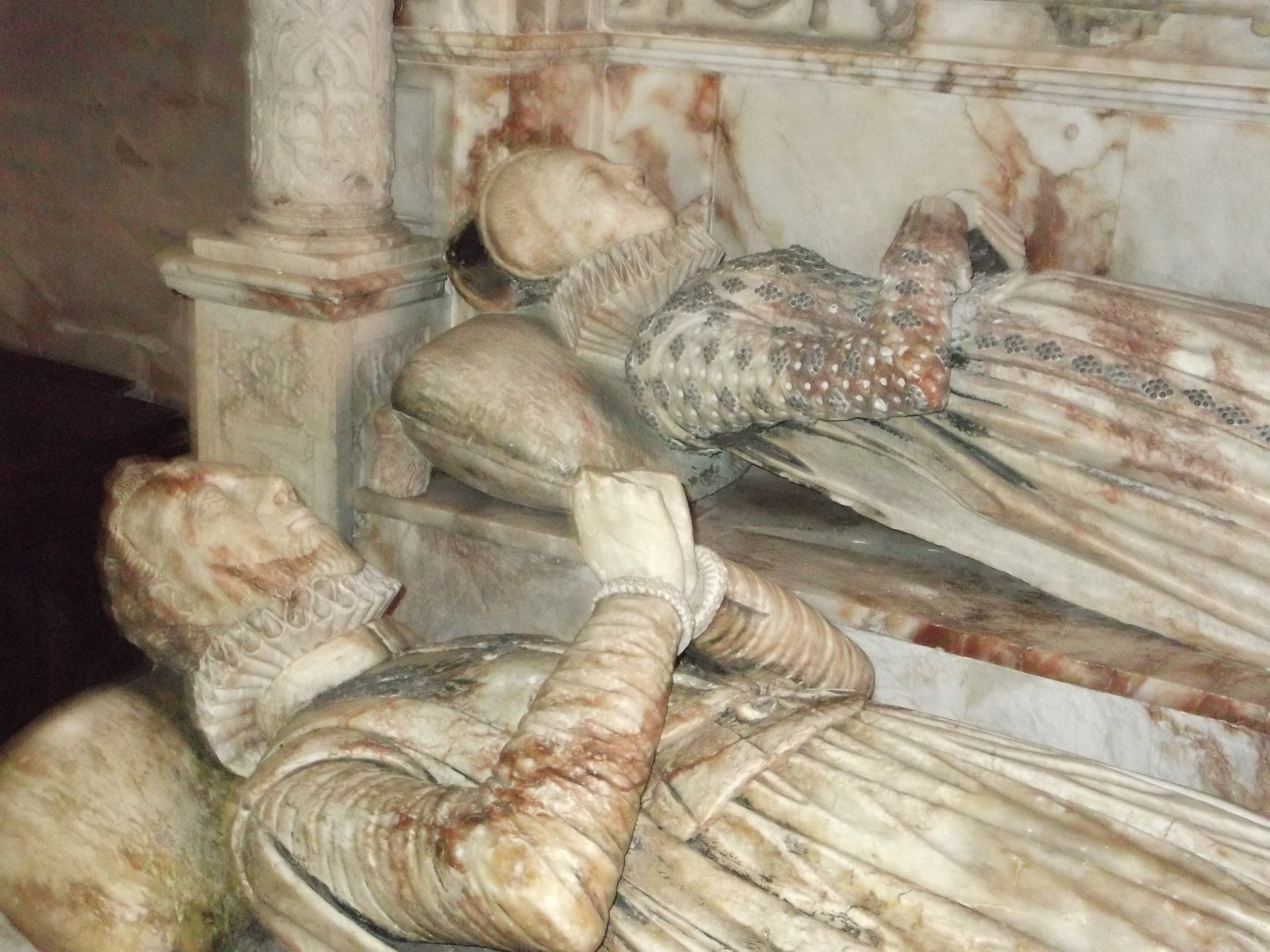
Effigies of George Bromley and Joan Waverton of Hallon, his wife.

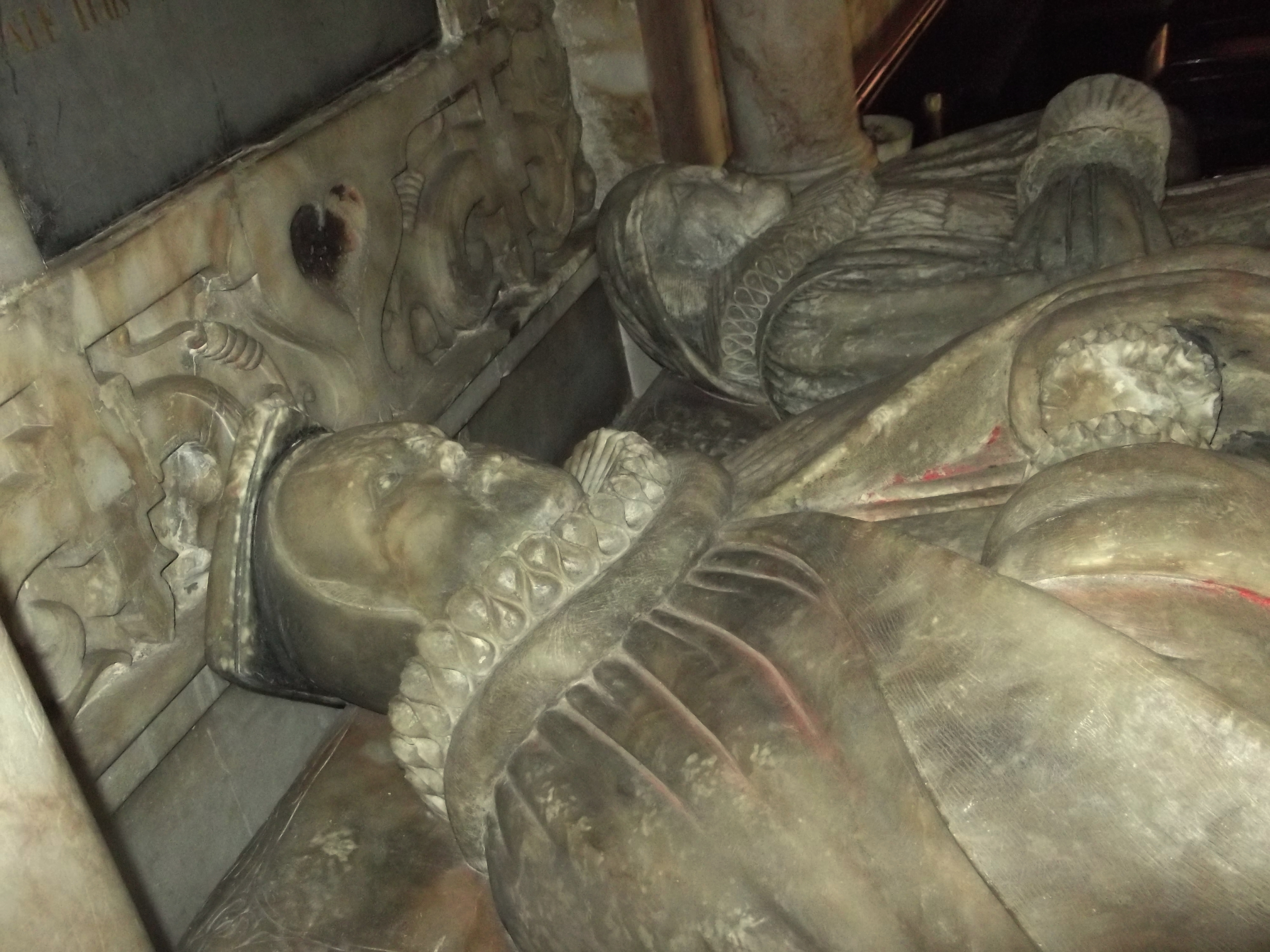
Effigies of Edward Bromley, son of George and Joan Bromley, and of Lady Margaret Bromley, his wife.

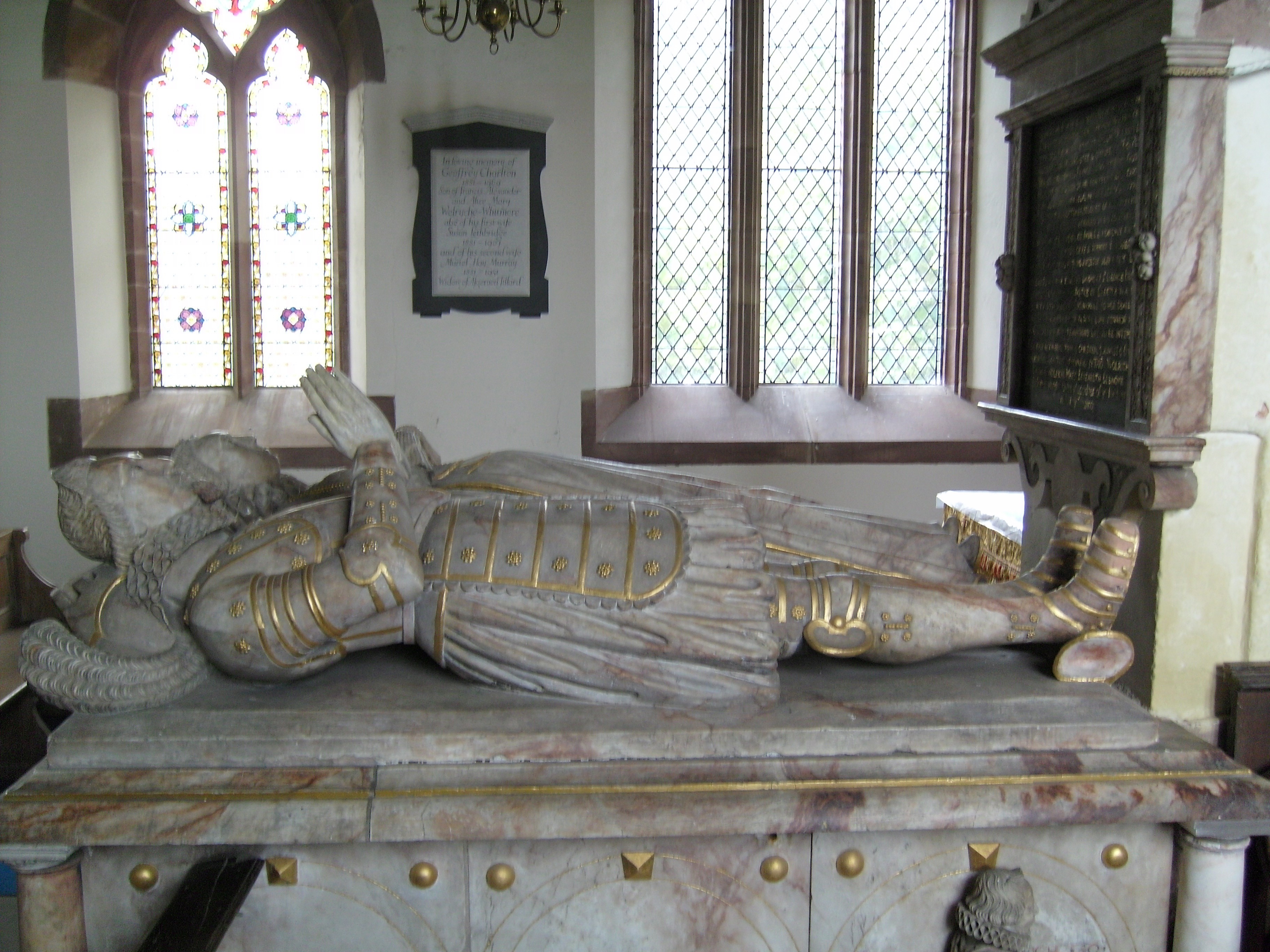
Tomb of Francis and Margaret Wolryche in St. Andrew's church, Quatt.

George Bromley married Joan Waverton, the daughter of John Waverton of Worfield. The name is also rendered Wannerton, as on Bromley's epitaph, and Waterton. The family are described as "rather obscure" and their origins are not certain, although the hamlet of Wannerton, near Kidderminster, is the main candidate. The Heraldic Visitation indicates that John Waverton acquired Hallon through marriage to the heiress Alicia Barker, (Alicia Barker's first husband was William Day of Hallon Worfield they had one known son Richard Day who married Jane Fowler) but Randall's history of Worfield has the Wavertons acquiring Hallon from the Barkers a generation earlier. The Barker family, long the owners of Hallon, had many branches and had close links with the Hills. Joan Waverton or Wannerton long outlived George Bromley, dying on 19 November 1606 at the age of 73. Of their children,

- Francis Bromley, the heir, served as MP for Shropshire. He died less than two years after his father. His son and heir, Thomas, died without issue in 1610. His daughter, Jane, married William Davenport, described as "of Hawne" in 1623, when the Davenport family were involved in an ultimately successful legal action to secure their title to Hallon.
- Edward Bromley was another distinguished lawyer who became a Baron of the Exchequer. He succeeded to his nephew's estates in 1610 but Hallon became the subject of a long and bitter dispute with the Davenport family. He died without issue, leaving the family estates to his younger brother, George.
- Margaret Bromley married Francis Wolryche of Dudmaston Hall. They became the ancestors of the Wolryche baronets.
- Mary Bromley married George Cotton of Combermere Abbey in Cheshire. They were the ancestors of the Cotton baronets of Combermere and the later Viscounts Combermere.

=== Family tree: descendants ===
Descendants of George Bromley

SIR GEORGE BROMLEY (c.1526–89), of Hallon in Worfield, MP for Much Wenlock, Liskeard and Shropshire	Jane Waverton of Hallon, Worfield
Francis Bromley (c.1556–91), of Hodnet, MP for Shropshire	Joyce Leighton of Wattlesborough	Sir Edward Bromley (1563–1626), of Shifnall Grange and Bridgnorth, Baron of the Exchequer, MP for Bridgnorth	Margaret Lowe of Enville, Staffordshire	George Bromley
Roger Puleston of Emral, MP for Flintshire and Denbighshire	Susan Bromley	George Cotton of Combermere Abbey	Mary Bromley	Francis Wolryche of Dudmaston Hall	Margaret Bromley
Thomas Bromley	Jane Bromley	William Davenport	Thomas Cotton	Elizabeth Calveley of Lea Newbold	Sir Thomas Wolryche, 1st Baronet	Ursula Otley of Pitchford Hall
Lettice Maddocks of Wolverhampton	Henry Davenport of Hallon	Hester Salusbury, daughter of Sir Thomas Salusbury, 2nd Baronet	Sir Robert Cotton, 1st Baronet, of Combermere	Wolryche baronets of Dudmaston
Davenport family of Davenport House, Worfield	Cotton baronets of Combermere, Cheshire, and Viscounts Combermere

== See also ==
- Richard Gwyn
