= Edward Bromley =

English lawyer, judge, landowner and politician

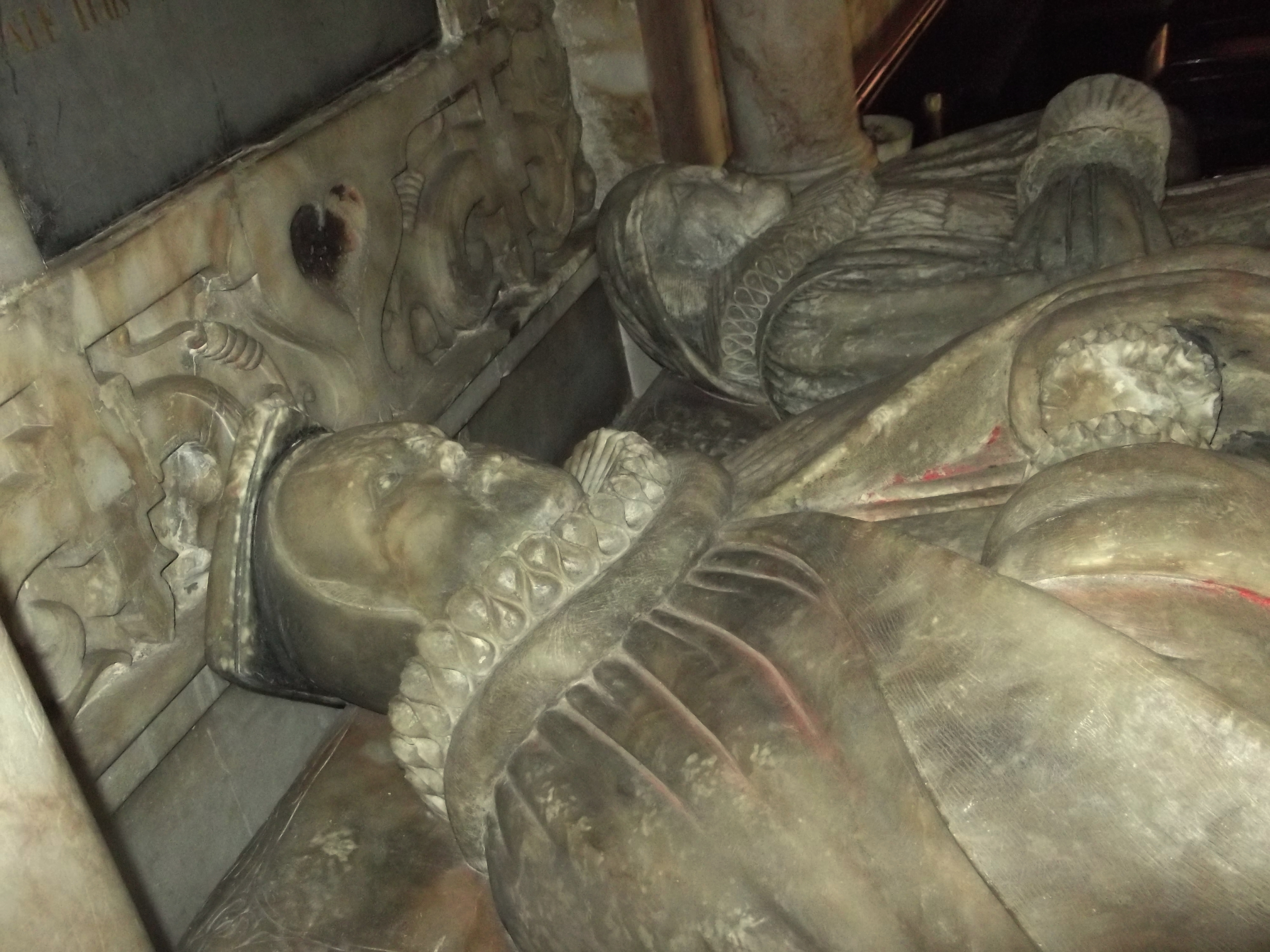
Effigies of Edward Bromley and Margaret Lowe, his wife, in Worfield parish church.

Sir Edward Bromley (1563–2 June 1626) was an English lawyer, judge, landowner and politician of the Elizabethan and Jacobean periods. A member of a Shropshire legal and landed gentry dynasty, he was prominent at the Inner Temple and became a Baron of the Exchequer. He was elected MP for Bridgnorth on six consecutive occasions.

== Background ==
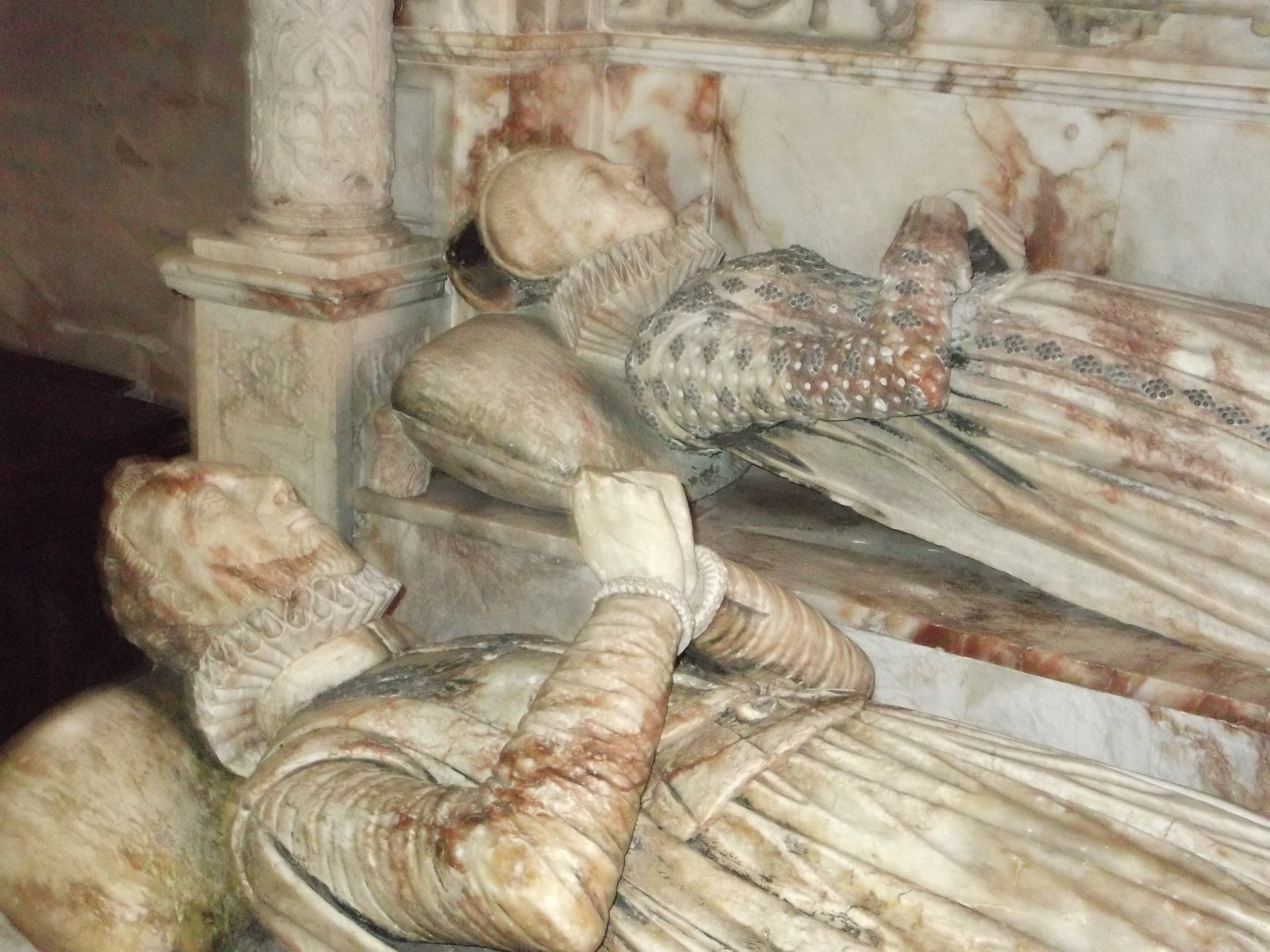
Effigies of George Bromley and Joan Waverton of Hallon, his wife, in St Peter's church at Worfield

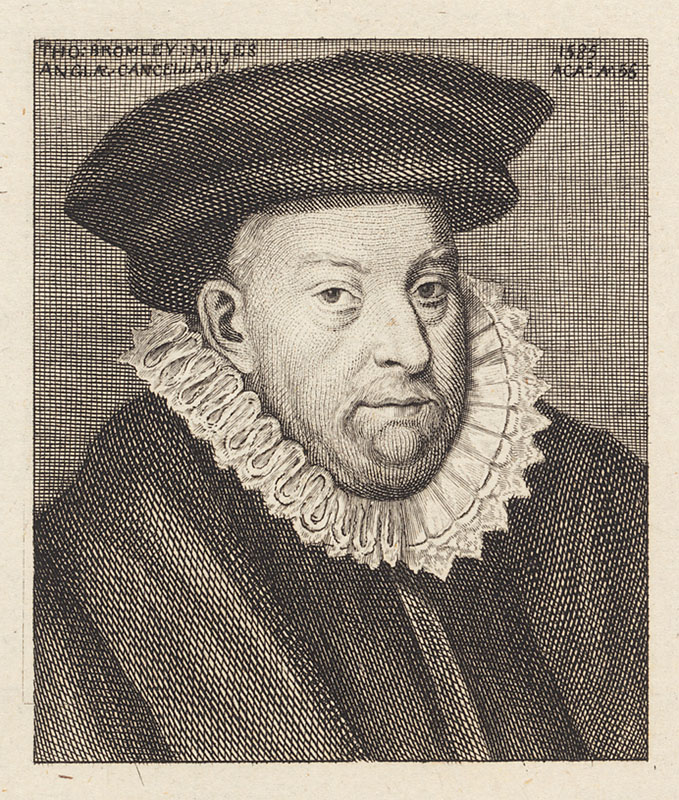
Sir Thomas Bromley, Edward's uncle, who became Lord Chancellor

Edward Bromley was the second son of

- Sir George Bromley of Hallon, near Worfield, in Shropshire, the son of George Bromley of Hodnet. Sir George, like his father, was an important figure at the Inner Temple and a considerable politician on the regional stage, becoming chief legal officer of the Council in the Marches of Wales and chief justice of Chester. His career was, however, overshadowed by that of his younger brother, Edward's uncle, Thomas Bromley, who became Lord Chancellor.
- Joan Waverton, the daughter of John Waverton of Worfield. The name is also rendered Wannerton, as on her tomb, and Waterton. The Wavertons had held Hallon (also rendered "Hawne") for probably only one generation. On acquiring it through marriage, George Bromley had made it his seat and the family home.

Edward Bromley's elder brother, Francis, was the heir to the Bromley estates. He had two more brothers and three sisters, who all married into regionally powerful gentry families. The gentry dominated Shropshire and, generally, its boroughs politically and culturally, as there was unusually no resident aristocracy in the county.

=== Family Tree ===
Edward Bromley, his siblings and their descendants

George Bromley (c.1526–89), of Hallon in Worfield, MP for Much Wenlock, Liskeard and Shropshire	Jane Waverton of Hallon, Worfield
Francis Bromley (c.1556–91), of Hodnet, MP for Shropshire	Joyce Leighton of Wattlesborough	SIR EDWARD BROMLEY (1563–1626), of Shifnall Grange and Bridgnorth, Baron of the Exchequer, MP for Bridgnorth	Margaret Lowe of Enville, Staffordshire	George Bromley
Roger Puleston of Emral, MP for Flintshire and Denbighshire	Susan Bromley	George Cotton of Combermere Abbey	Mary Bromley	Francis Wolryche of Dudmaston Hall	Margaret Bromley
Thomas Bromley	Jane Bromley	William Davenport	Thomas Cotton	Elizabeth Calveley of Lea Newbold	Sir Thomas Wolryche, 1st Baronet	Ursula Otley of Pitchford Hall
Lettice Maddocks of Wolverhampton	Henry Davenport of Hallon	Hester Salusbury, daughter of Sir Thomas Salusbury, 2nd Baronet	Sir Robert Cotton, 1st Baronet, of Combermere	Wolryche baronets of Dudmaston
Davenport family of Davenport House, Worfield	Cotton baronets of Combermere, Cheshire, and Viscounts Combermere

== Education and legal training ==
Edward Bromley was sent to Shrewsbury School in 1577 at about the age of 14. The school was explicitly committed to a Christian and humanist ethos, reflecting Calvinist principles. The first head Thomas Ashton had established a tradition of using drama to develop students' confidence and self-expression.

Bromley was admitted to the Inner Temple by its parliament on 27 November 1580: a special admission, without cost, in recognition of his father's status. An undated note states that he was in debt to the treasurer, Andrew Gray, to the tune of 20 marks: Gray was treasurer during 1585–6. Bromley's call to the bar was noted by the parliament on 5 July 1590. The same meeting noted that he was permitted to use a chamber over the buttery, which had been restored by Michael Lowe, and was used also by his nephew, Humphrey Lowe. In 1595 the shared chamber fell into disrepair and the Inner Temple itself was forced to take action, spending £40 on repairs and subsequently billing Lowe and his relative Abney, for 20 marks each. The chamber seems to have become a family institution, with Bromley on a similar footing to Lowe's blood relations. The association was entirely reciprocal: In November 1590 Lowe, a chief clerk of the King's Bench, was accorded a seat next to Bromley and "ancienty" of those under Bromley, i.e. recognised as their co-tutor. Bromley's marriage to Margaret Lowe in April 1593 was one result of this close association.

Bromley went on to achieve prominence at the Inner Temple. He was called to the bench on 19 May 1603. Responsibilities, minor at first, quickly followed. In June 1604 it was steward for the Reader's dinner, and in November auditor for the steward's accounts, and in April 1605 he and Sir Edward Coke were nominated as attendants to the Reader – generally a signal that the appointee was himself to receive this high academic honour in the near future. As expected, on 3 November 1605 the Inn's parliament named Bromley Lent Reader for the following year, attended by Coke and Sir John Jackson Later in the year he was able to nominate students for special admissions, a sign of his greatly enhanced status. After this his career took a turn towards the administration of justice.

== Parliamentary career ==
=== Elizabethan parliament ===
Bromley's parliamentary career unfolded alongside his progress at his Inn of Court. He was returned as an MP for Bridgnorth at every election between 1586 and 1604 – a total of six times. Bridgnorth was a small town, governed by a council of two bailiffs and 24 aldermen. Although the council nominally selected the MP, with the consent of the burgesses, the Council in the Marches and local gentry effectively shared parliamentary representation, ensuring that lawyers monopolised the seats. Bromley would have had little difficulty in securing election, as he had leverage on all counts. He was a landowner based very locally and Sir George Bromley, his father, was both acting head of the Council in the Marches, between the death of Henry Sidney and the arrival of his successor, and recorder of Bridgnorth. In 1586, 1588, 1593 and 1597 Bromley took the first of the two seats, with John Lutwich as his colleague. Lutwich shared Bromley's social and professional background: a Shropshire landowner prominent in London at Lincoln's Inn. In the last of the Elizabethan parliaments, elected in October 1601, Bromley was outranked by Thomas Horde, who had succeeded Sir George as recorder in 1589, and took the second seat. Bromley made no impact on the work of the Elizabethan House of Commons.

=== First parliament of James I ===
In 1604 Bromley was elected to the first parliament of James I, which was to last until 1611. This time he took second place to Sir Lewis Lewknor, a colourful scholar of Catholic leanings, who had been appointed the king's Master of the Ceremonies. Lewknor probably owed his election to the influence of his uncle, Sir Richard Lewknor, chief justice of Chester and an influential member of the Council in the Marches. Bromley left some traces in the record of the parliament, but despite his legal qualifications and acumen, was not as active as Lewknor.

Bromley was sent to confer with the House of Lords on the king's proposals for a Union of the kingdoms of Scotland and England. He was also instructed to draft a bill to exclude "outlaws" – in this context referring to recusants as well as perjurers and forgers – from Parliament. This was a response to the election of Francis Goodwin to represent Buckinghamshire, which was challenged by the sheriff and led to a wrangle between king and parliament. The proposed bill was a sop to the king: although Bromley and others were appointed to a committee, it was allowed to fade from attention and no report was ever produced. As he was a trustee of the Worcestershire estates of Thomas Lyttelton, he was made chairman of the committee which prepared a bill to rehabilitate John Lyttelton, Thomas's father, who was attainted and died in prison after the Essex Rebellion of 1601. This was business of great importance to the Bromley family, as John Lyttelton's widow and Thomas's mother was Meriel Bromley, Edward Bromley's cousin and a daughter of Thomas Bromley, the former Lord Chancellor.Sir Henry Bromley, Meriel's brother and a close friend of Edward, sat alongside him on the committee.

Bromley was compelled to resign his parliamentary seat in February 1610, when he was made a judge, occasioning a contested by-election – a very rare event.

=== Continuing political interest ===
Although Bromley never stood again for parliament, he remained influential at Bridgnorth and at Much Wenlock, in both of which he later became recorder. He seems to have avoided direct involvement in a bitterly contested by-election to find his successor at Bridgnorth, although the ultimate victor was Sir Francis Lacon, a Catholic sympathiser who was Bromley's cousin, once removed. His main interest was in the constituency of Much Wenlock, which was small and easier to manipulate. Bromley's nephew, Thomas Wolryche of Dudmaston Hall, was returned as MP in 1621, 1624 and 1625.

== Judicial career ==
As late as 23 January 1610 John Chamberlain, the noted letter writer, described Bromley as "an obscure lawyer of the Inner Temple." Within two weeks he was promoted to the higher ranks of the judiciary.

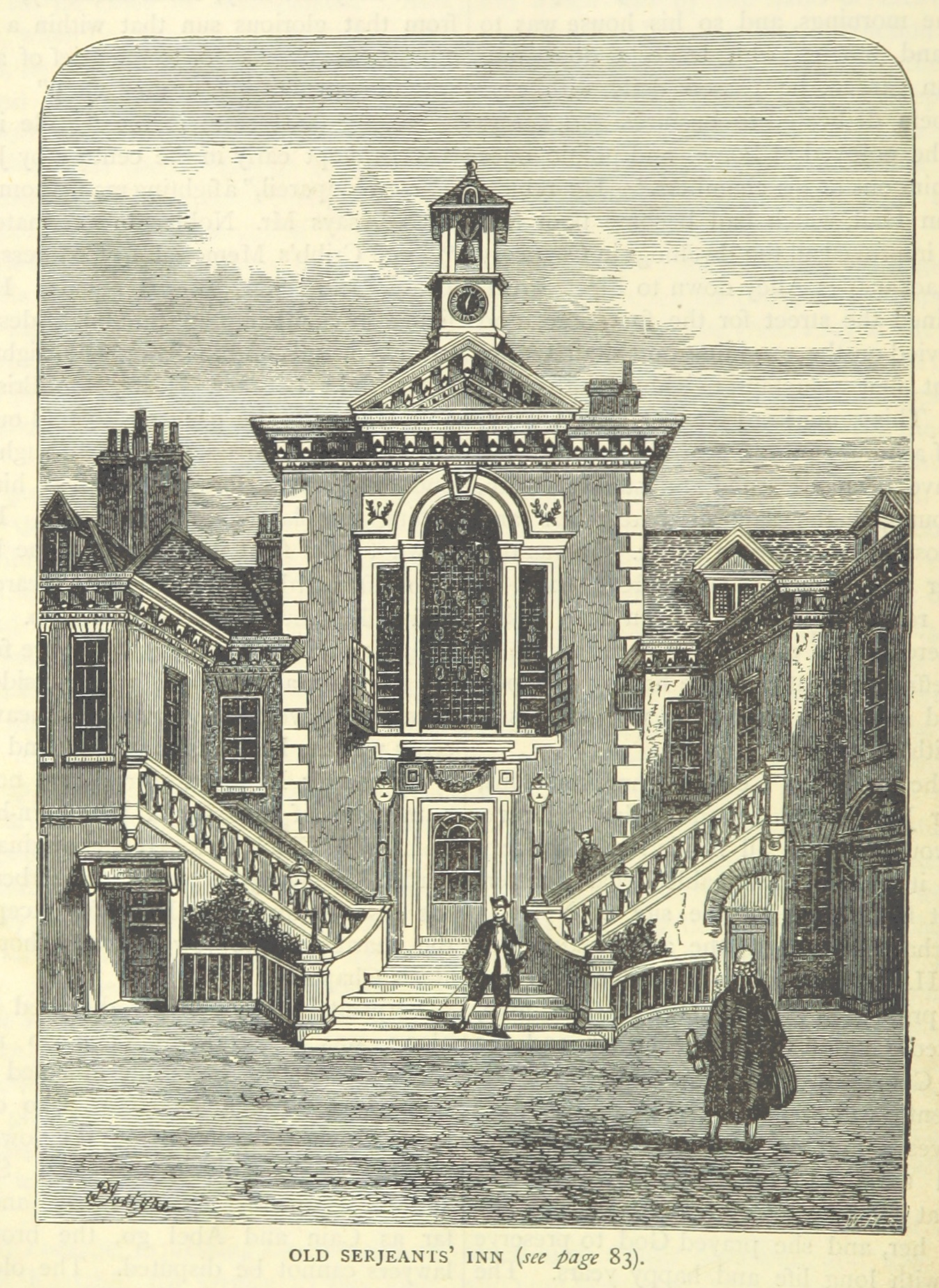
Serjeant's Inn as it appeared in the early 19th century. It was destroyed in World War II.

On 5 February 1610 Bromley, along with Sir John Denham, was made a Serjeant-at-law, one of an elite corps of barristers. The promotion was for the express purpose of making him a judge. Only Bromley and Sir Edward Coke received the Call to the Coif for this purpose in the reign of James I. He was presented with a purse containing £10 by the treasurer of the Inner Temple. The benchers and fellows of the Inner Temple then accompanied him in procession to Serjeant's Inn, where he was robed, and then to Westminster for his inauguration.

Next day, 6 February, Bromley was appointed a Baron of the Exchequer in place of Edward Heron, who had died after serving only a little over two years. The Barons were judges in the Exchequer of Pleas, a court which dealt with important equity cases. He was the third in his family to be "adorned with the judicial ermine," after Chief Justice Thomas Bromley, and the Lord Chancellor. When he went to the Exchequer on his first day of service, wearing his judge's ermine, the entire available membership of the Inner Temple and the Inns of Chancery preceded him on foot. On 26 February he was knighted at the Palace of Whitehall. Bromley held his post at the Exchequer until his death, serving for all but the last year under Sir Lawrence Tanfield, the Chief Baron of the Exchequer, and sitting alongside Denham from 1617. Bromley and Denham had their patents renewed on the accession of Charles I in March 1625. Tanfield died a month after being reappointed and was replaced by Sir John Walter.

Alongside his work in London at the Exchequer, Bromley also operated as a justice of assize, working on the Northern circuit from 1610 until 1618, when he moved to the Midland circuit. Before his transfer he had been appointed recorder of Much Wenlock in Shropshire and thereafter he took recorderships at two more towns in his own county: Shrewsbury and Bridgnorth.

== Landowner ==
As a second son, Edward Bromley can have had little expectation of inheriting substantial estates. He was installed in a modest property of the Bromley patrimony at Shifnal, which became his seat: he was known as “of Shifnall Grange” in his early career. When Sir George Bromley died in 1589, the estates passed to his first son, Francis Bromley, who thus held land at Hodnet, Wistanswick, and Allerton, as well as his mother's estate of Hallon and other lands in the Bridgnorth area. He survived for less than two years. The Bromley estates then passed to his young son, Thomas.

Edward Bromley, meanwhile, start to build up his own landholding, in 1593 marrying the coheiress to the small estate of Tymore, near Enville, in neighbouring Staffordshire, who brought a scattering of land across the Midlands. From this point he began to occupy a selection of the local and regional offices that pertained to the landed gentry. By 1595 he was serving as a Justice of the Peace for Shropshire. In 1603 he became steward of Morfa Forest in the west of the county. After the Gunpowder Plot he was appointed to the commission which investigated the conspirators' lands in Shropshire. He was a commissioner for the subsidy in 1608. Most of these posts brought some profit as well as responsibility.

Only two weeks after Edward Bromley became Baron of the Exchequer, his nephew Thomas died, leaving him as heir to the entailed Bromley estates. However, matters were not so clear-cut at Hallon itself. Francis Bromley also left a daughter, Jane, who had married William Davenport, allegedly after a secret and forbidden courtship. Jane and William Davenport now laid claim to Hallon and the other lands that had been inherited through Edward and Francis's mother, Jane Waverton or Wannerton. Although Bromley now regarded Hallon as his seat, Davenport was described as "of Hawne" in the Heraldic Visitation of 1623. The dispute lasted for decades, with Hallon finally in the hands of the Davenport family and becoming their seat, Davenport House.

== Death ==
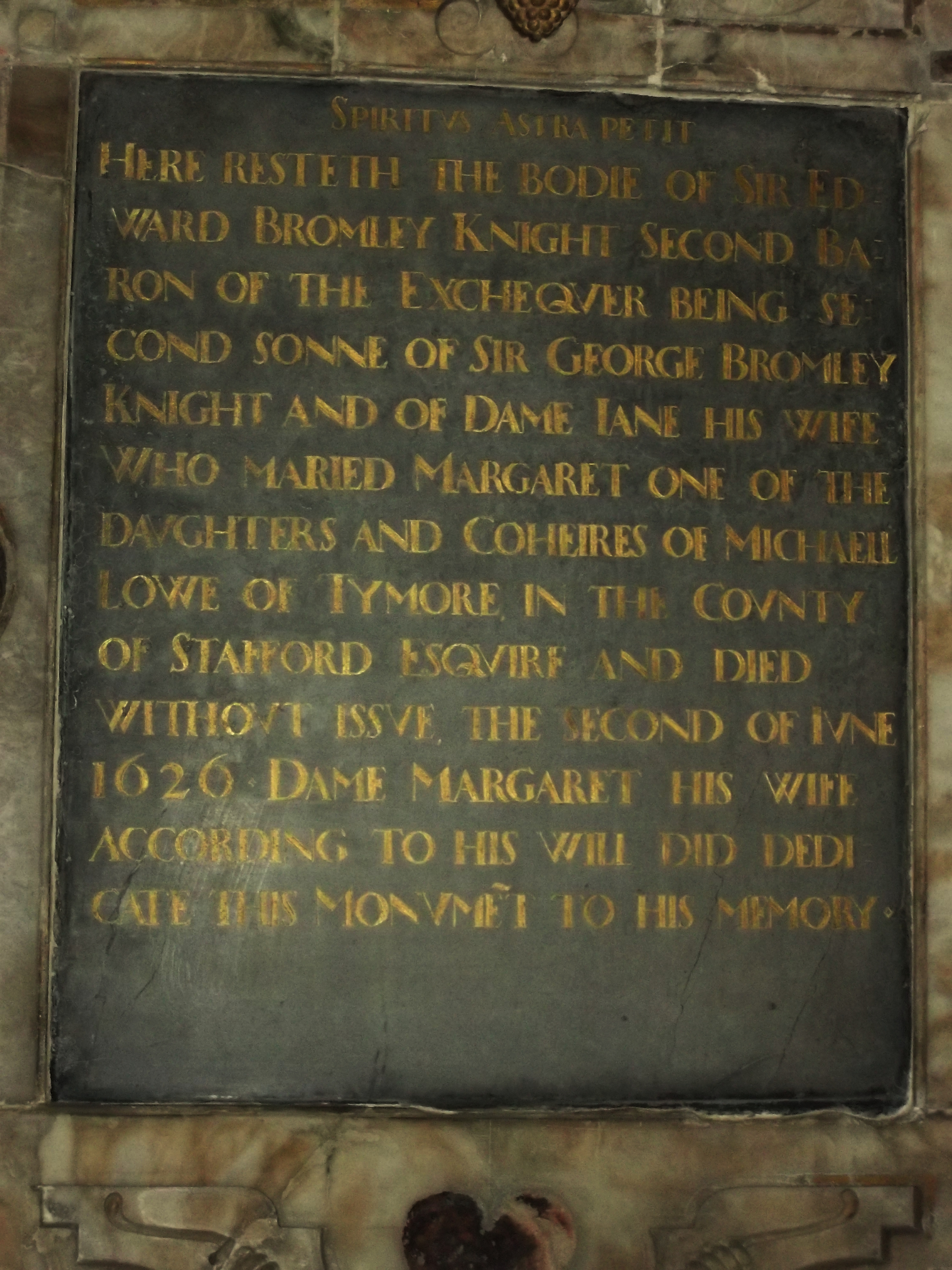
Epitaph of Sir Edward Bromley

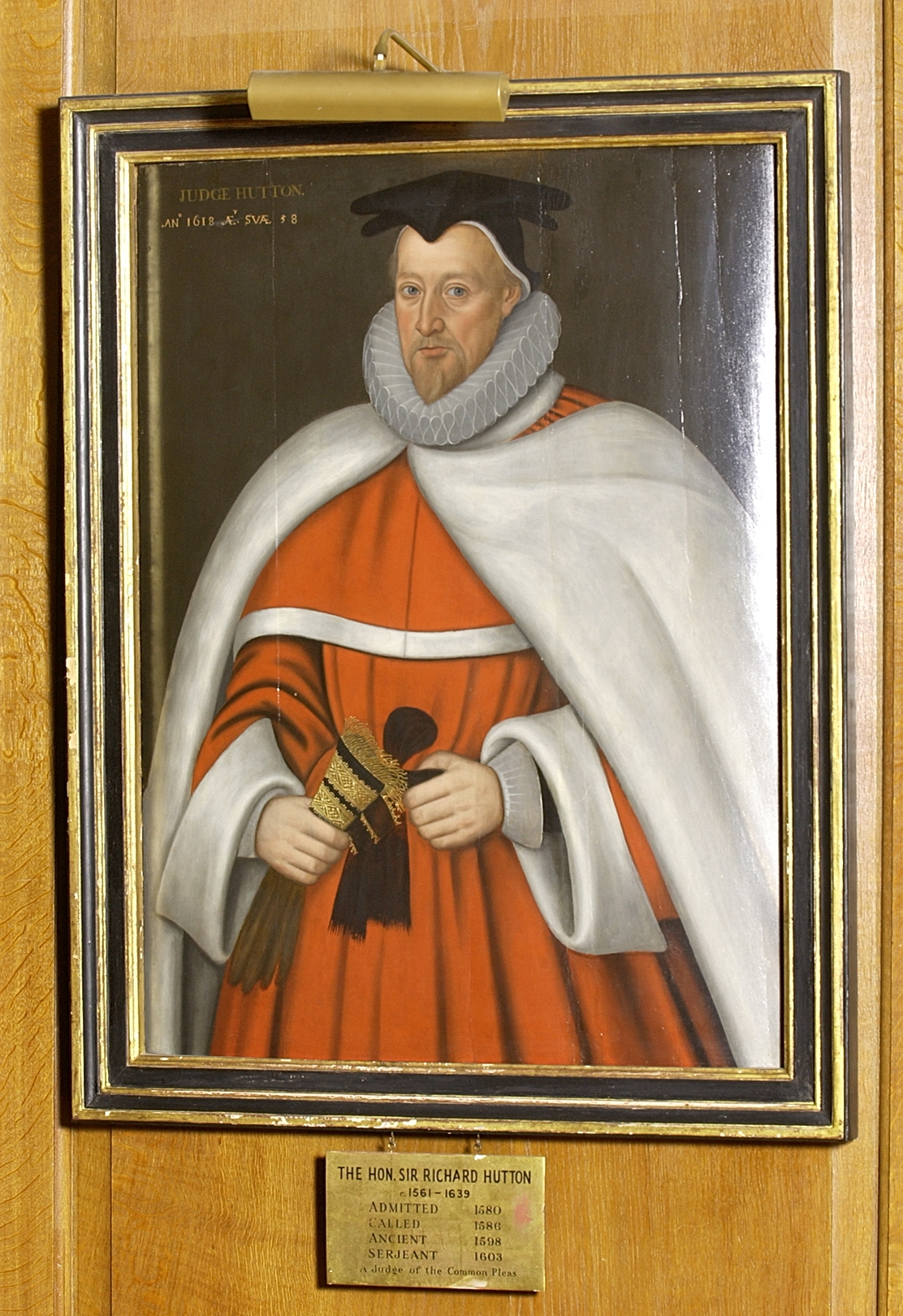
Sir Richard Hutton, a friend of Bromley and, with Denham, an overseer of his will.

Bromley died on 2 June 1626. He was interred in St Peter's church at Worfield. In his will, dated 14 October 1625, he asks for a night burial two days after his death "without funeral pompe." It appears that the Inner Temple had already installed a stained glass window displaying Bromley's armorial bearings and this was restored some time shortly after his death, presumably as a mark of respect.

Bromley left £100 for "a monument to be set up in Shifnall church or elsewhere". He had installed a fine alabaster monument for his parents at Worfield and may have doubted it would be available. In the event, a substantial alabaster tomb was built at Worfield and dedicated to him by his wife. His epitaph reads:

Spiritus astra petit. (Latin: The spirit strives for the stars.)
Here resteth the Bodie of Sir Edward Bromley, Knight, second Baron of Exchequer, being second sonne of Sir George Bromley, Knight, and of Dame Jane his wife. Who married Margaret one of the daughters and coheirs of Michael Lowe, of Tymore, in the County of Stafford, Esquire and died without issue, the second of June 1626. Dame Margaret his wife according to his will did dedicate this monument to his memory.

The tomb stood at the east end of the north aisle, together with his parents' tomb. The Bromley tombs were moved further west in 1866, following major restoration work to the church.

The entailed patrimonial lands automatically went to Bromley's younger brother, George. Edward Bromley left plate to the value of £20 to each of his godchildren, Thomas Wolryche and Thomas and Dorothy Cotton. He had hoped to give his wife the use of his possessions during her lifetime but ultimately to have them divided among his godsons and servants. He had thought to secure Hallon and his mother's other lands by paying off Thomas Bromley's creditors with £700 but Jane and William Davenport were still pressing their claim. This affected an arrangement he had made with his wife, assigning her some of the properties as part of her jointure. Almost at the last moment he had attached a codicil giving all his personal property to his wife in compensation for her likely losses. He appointed as overseers of his will his three sisters, his brother-in-law Cotton and his friends, the judges John Denham and Sir Richard Hutton: both were later to defy Charles I over ship money. He left small sums for the poor of Worfield, Bridgnorth, Shifnal, Much Wenlock, Shrewsbury and Sheriffhales.

== Marriage and family ==
Edward Bromley married Margaret Lowe, daughter and heiress of Nicholas Lowe of Tymore, in the parish of Enville, Staffordshire on 18 March 1593. The marriage was without issue.

Bromley cultivated close links with his godchildren, who were the children of his sisters, and with his cousins, the Bromleys of Worcestershire, particularly Sir Henry Bromley and his children. In October 1615 he arranged for the Inner Temple to admit Philip, one of Sir Henry's sons, whom he hoped to adopt as his heir, along with his own nephew, Thomas Wolryche, and, few months later, George Wolryche and John Lyttelton, a son of Meriel Bromley, were similarly admitted. Philip Bromley seems to have predeceased him.

After a marriage of 33 years to Bromley, Lady Margaret Bromley was his widow for more than 30: she was buried on 23 March 1657 at Loughborough in Leicestershire, where she had lived in her later years. The austerity shown in her husband's will was amplified in hers, which was dated 6 March 1657. She asked that only one nephew, James Abney, attend her funeral and that even bell ringing be avoided. Most of the bequests relate to Abney and to other nephews and nieces, the Bromskills. Calamy, the historian who collated information about the Great Ejection, added a supplementary note to his account of Leicestershire for the 1702 edition:

Loughborough : Mr. OLIVER BRUMSKILL. Add; He was a judicious solid Divine, and excellent Preacher, and holy Liver. He liv'd with that eminent Saint, the old Lady Bromley, Widow to Judge Bromley.

Bromskill, a Presbyterian minister of the Commonwealth period, was evidently related to Lady Bromley by marriage and her active support for his ministry, as well as Calamy's encomium, makes clear that she was a committed Puritan.
