= Francis Bromley =

English politician

Francis Bromley (ca. 1556–1591) was an English politician. A member of an important legal and landowning dynasty of the Shropshire landed gentry, his career was cut short by an early death. He was a Member (MP) of the Parliament of England for Shropshire in 1584.

== Background ==
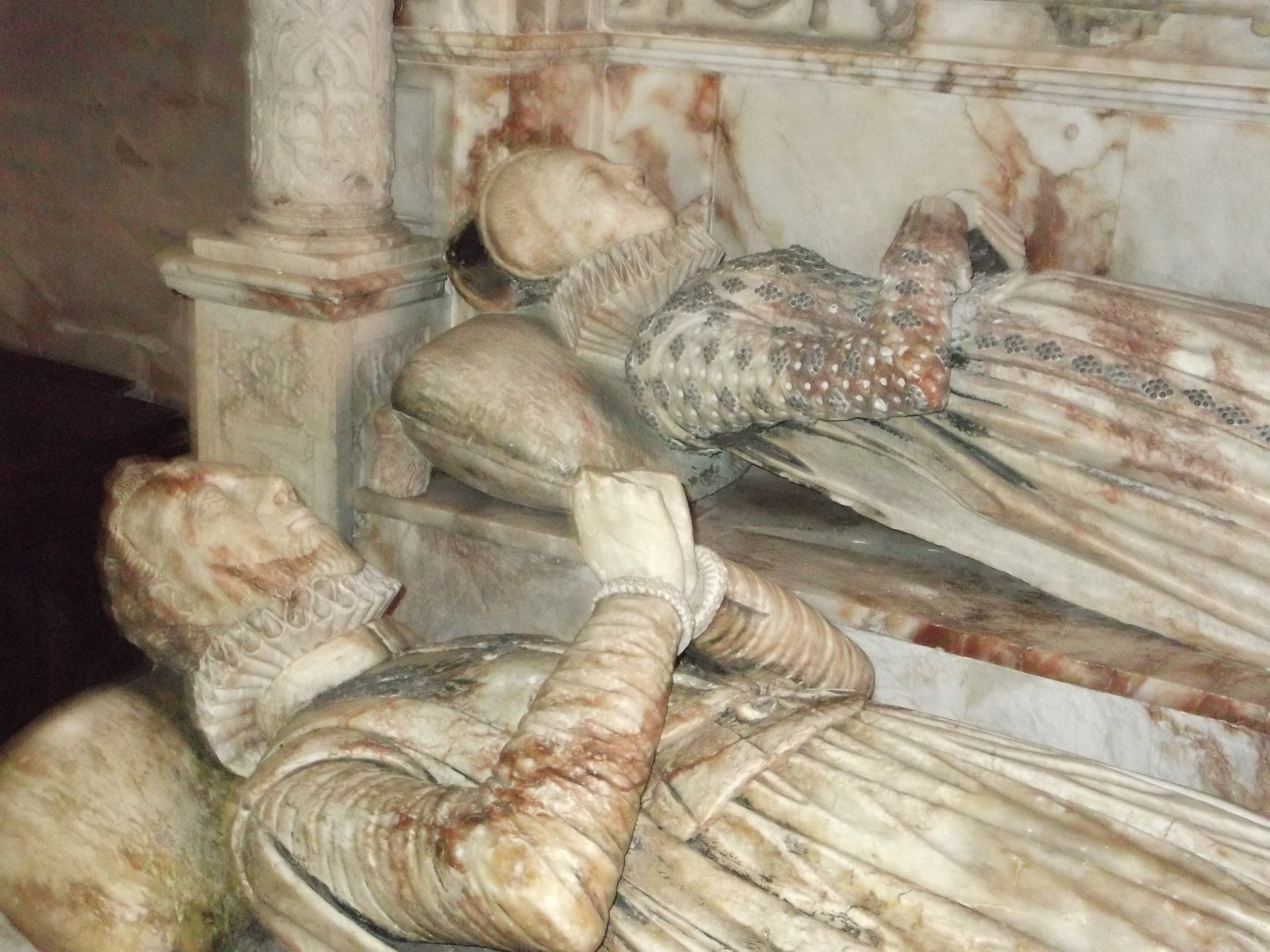
Effigies of Francis Bromley's parents in St Peter's church at Worfield

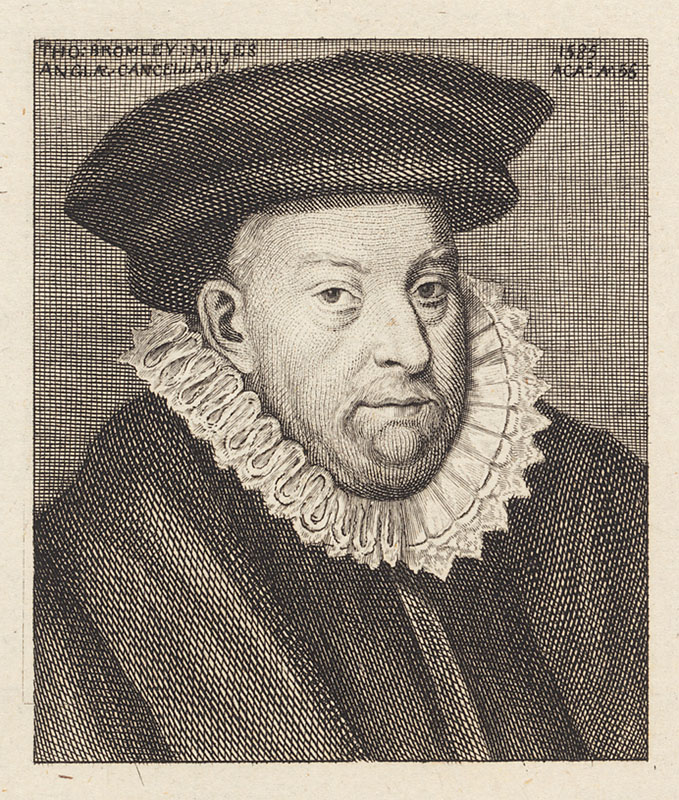
Sir Thomas Bromley, the famous uncle who became Lord Chancellor.

Francis Bromley was the eldest son and heir to the estates of

- Sir George Bromley of Hallon, near Worfield, in Shropshire. Sir George was an important lawyer, who exercise great power and influence through his posts at with the Duchy of Lancaster and the Council in the Marches of Wales and as chief justice of Chester.
- Joan Waverton, the daughter and heiress of John Waverton or Wannerton of Worfield. George Bromley acquired Hallon (also rendered "Hawne") through a strategic marriage and made it his seat and the family home.

Other members of Bromley's family besides his father had trained at the Inner Temple and earned great wealth and power through practice of the Law, including his uncle, Thomas Bromley, the Lord Chancellor, and another earlier Thomas Bromley who had become Chief Justice. Francis also had a younger brother, Edward Bromley, who was to become a Baron of the Exchequer.

== Education and training ==
Bromley was sent to Shrewsbury School in 1565, at a time when it was still new under the headship of Thomas Ashton, and an explicitly Calvinist institution. He entered Magdalen College, Oxford on 10 January 1575: his stated age of 19 helps determine his date of birth as around 1556.

Bromley was admitted to the Inner Temple by special dispensation of its parliament on 28 April 1577. His father, George, and his uncle Thomas were both among the presiding benchers at the parliament and, although the terms are not stated, it is likely he was admitted gratis or at a reduced fee in deference to his father's distinction. His brother Edward was also the subject of a special admission in 1580. While Edward went on to some eminence in the profession, Francis is not mentioned again by name in the records, so it is likely his studies were intended to give him the legal foundation useful to his future position as a significant landowner in Shropshire. He was appointed a Justice of the Peace in 1583.

== Member of Parliament ==
Francis Bromley was elected knight of the shire for Shropshire in November 1584. The county seats were never contested and almost always taken by members of the local landed gentry, many of them members of or associated with the Council in the Marches, an arm of central government which dominated the West Midlands. As Sir George Bromley was very influential in the council, and his family were among the foremost gentry families in a gentry-dominated county, he would have had little difficulty inserting his son into a county seat. Francis took the second seat, deferring in order of precedence to Walter Leveson of Lilleshall Abbey.

The parliament assembled on 23 November and lasted for about ten months. Bromley played only a small part. He was appointed to the subsidy committee, reviewing the queen's main channel of taxation, in February 1585. However, in March he was given leave to return to Shropshire for the assizes.

== Landowner ==
Sir George Bromley died on 2 March 1589 leaving Francis the Bromley family estates scattered across northern Shropshire, including land at Hawkestone near Hodnet, Wistanswick, and Allerton, as well as Hallon.

However, Francis Bromley headed the family for only two years. He died in 1591, leaving his young son Thomas to inherit.

== Marriage and family ==
Bromley married in 1581 Joyce Leighton, Latinised as Jocosa in the Heraldic Visitation and elsewhere, although this is a misunderstanding of the name. Joyce Leighton was the daughter of:

- Edward Leighton of Wattlesborough.
- Anne Darrell, daughter of Paul Darrell of Lillingstone Dayrell, Buckinghamshire.

This was a marriage of equals, with both partners coming from the dominant group of county gentry families. Edward Leighton was a powerful force politically in Shropshire during the 1580s. He was a member of the Council in the Marches and became custos rotulorum of his county in 1587.

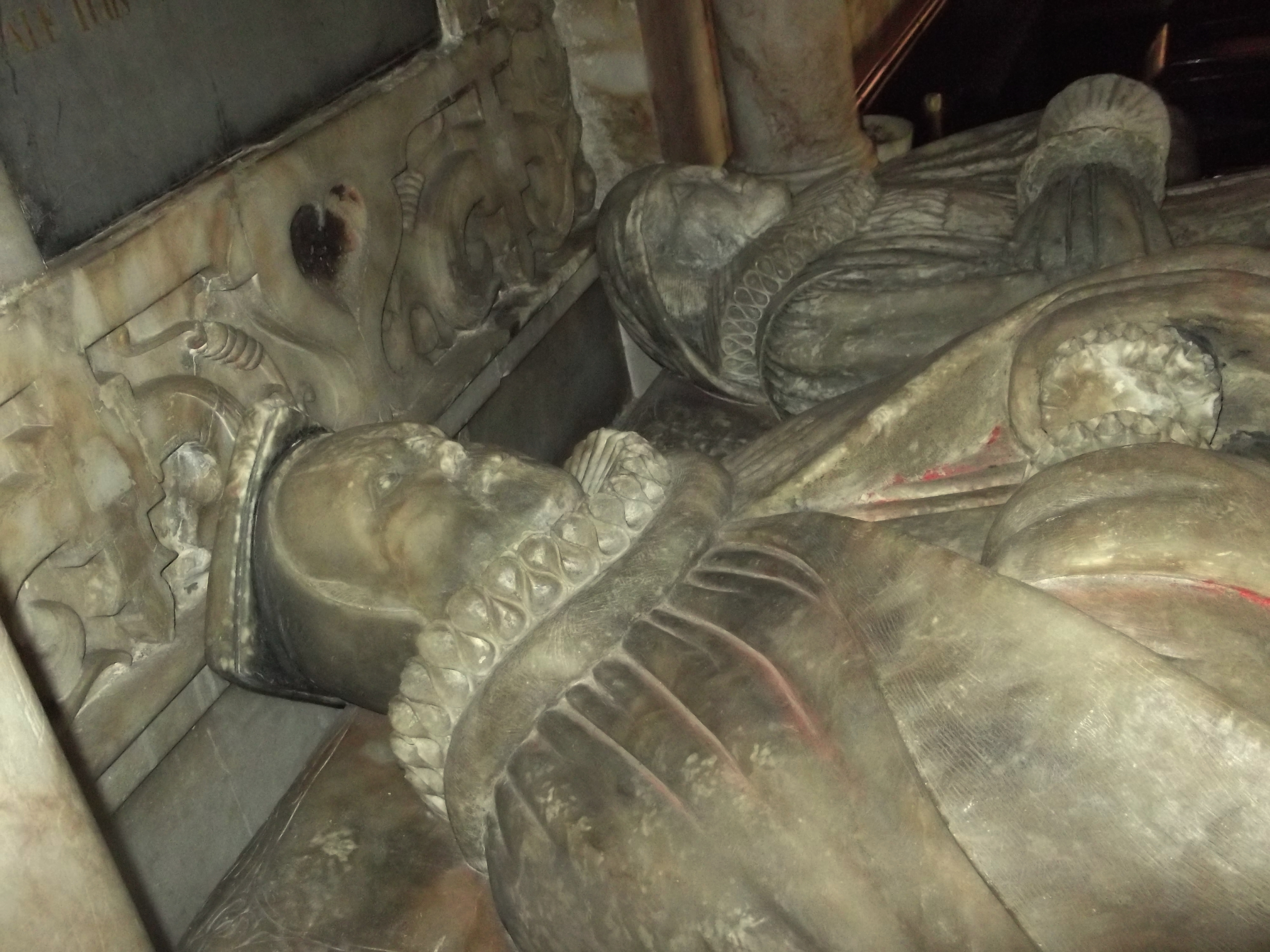
Effigies of Edward Bromley and Margaret Lowe, his wife, in Worfield parish church. Edward, Francis's younger brother, inherited the Bromley properties in 1610 on the death, sine prole, of Francis's son, Thomas.

Francis Bromley and Joyce Leighton had two children:

- Thomas Bromley, the heir, who married Eleanor Jenks but died without issue in 1610, leaving the Bromley estates to Edward Bromley, Francis's younger brother. Edward died in 1626, also without issue, leaving them to Sir George's third son, also called George.
- Jane Bromley, who married William Davenport.

Hallon became the focus of a bitter legal wrangle, lasting over several decades, the origin of which is recounted by Randall, the historian of Worfield, with some apologies for straying into the "region of tradition, but tradition fortified by facts." Joyce Leighton remarried after the death of Francis Bromley, becoming the second wife of Walter Wrottesley of Wrottesley Park, near Tettenhall: a remarriage mentioned by the Visitation of Shropshire and Burke's Peerage. William Davenport and Jane Bromley allegedly eloped after a secret and forbidden courtship in the grounds of Wrottesley. Subsequently, they put forward a claim to Hallon, which Edward Bromley had assumed was his. The family dispute was ultimately to be resolved in the Davenports' favour, with Hallon becoming Davenport House.

=== Family tree ===
Francis Bromley, his successors and other descendants of George Bromley

George Bromley (c.1526–89), of Hallon in Worfield, MP for Much Wenlock, Liskeard and Shropshire, Chief Justice of Chester	Jane Waverton of Hallon, Worfield
FRANCIS BROMLEY (c.1556–91), of Hodnet, MP for Shropshire	Joyce Leighton of Wattlesborough	Sir Edward Bromley (1563–1626), of Shifnall Grange and Bridgnorth, Baron of the Exchequer, MP for Bridgnorth	Margaret Lowe of Enville, Staffordshire	George Bromley
Roger Puleston of Emral, MP for Flintshire and Denbighshire	Susan Bromley	George Cotton of Combermere Abbey	Mary Bromley	Francis Wolryche of Dudmaston Hall	Margaret Bromley
Thomas Bromley	Jane Bromley	William Davenport	Thomas Cotton	Elizabeth Calveley of Lea Newbold	Sir Thomas Wolryche, 1st Baronet	Ursula Otley of Pitchford Hall
Lettice Maddocks of Wolverhampton	Henry Davenport of Hallon	Hester Salusbury, daughter of Sir Thomas Salusbury, 2nd Baronet	Sir Robert Cotton, 1st Baronet, of Combermere	Wolryche baronets of Dudmaston
Davenport family of Davenport House, Worfield	Cotton baronets of Combermere, Cheshire, and Viscounts Combermere
