= Margaret Bromley =

17th-century English Puritan

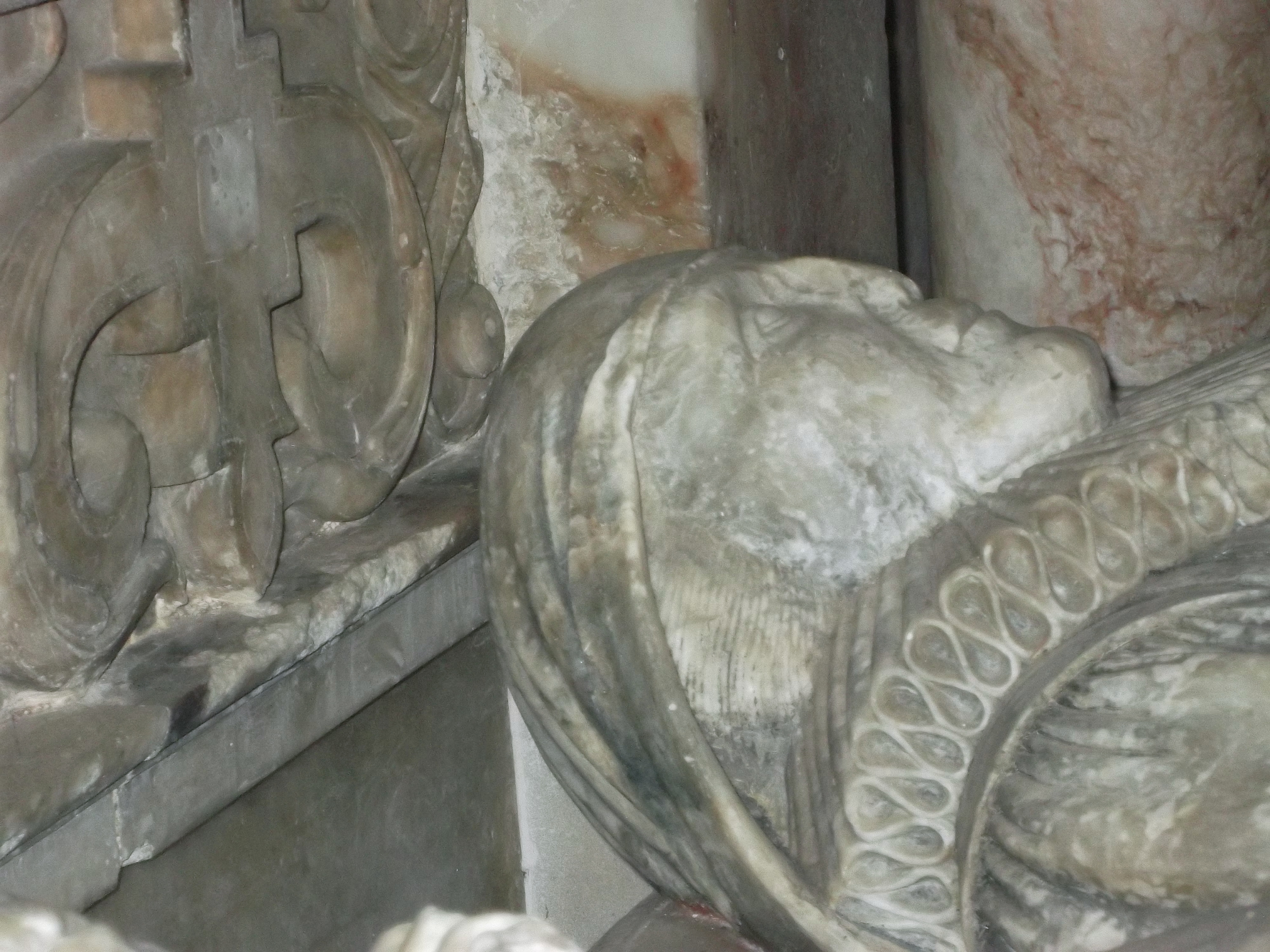
- Effigy of Margaret Bromley
- Born: Margaret Lowe; Unknown; Probably Lichfield
- Died: 1657; Loughborough
- Occupation: Landowner
- Years active: 1626-57
- Known for: Supporting nonconformist ministers.
- Spouse: Sir Edward Bromley (1593–1626)
- Parent(s): Michael Lowe of Tymore (died 1593-4); Margaret Biddulph (died 1584)

Margaret Bromley née Lowe (died 1657) was a noted English Puritan of Staffordshire origins. She married Sir Edward Bromley, a noted lawyer and judge of the period. After his death she established a base for sheltering and supporting nonconforming ministers at Sheriffhales. Leaving the area during the English Civil War, she spent the final years of her life at Loughborough.

== Origins ==
Map of Staffordshire to show places mentioned in the text.

Margaret Bromley is identified by the heraldic visitation of Staffordshire as the daughter of Nicholas Lowe of Tymore, Enville, Staffordshire. This Enville connection has been accepted by several authorities since, including successive volumes of The History of Parliament, which name her father as Nicholas Lowe of Enville. It is true that a family named Lowe had a long history as landowners in the region and were once the lords of the manor of Enville: it passed to the Grey family in the 15th century when Eleanor Lowe, heir of Humphrey Lowe, married Robert Grey, son of the notorious marcher lord Reginald Grey, 3rd Baron Grey de Ruthyn.

However, the house known as Tymore or Timmor was not at Enville: the Victoria County History locates it rather at Fisherwick, near Lichfield, on the other side of the county. It was part of the manor of Lichfield, which was held by the Bishop of Lichfield, although leased to the corporation of Lichfield. Parts of Tymore, including the house, some of the land and other rights, were leased for £100 to Michael Lowe and his heirs in October 1581, using the archaic device of fine of lands, by Peter Roos or Ross. Ross had himself purchased Tymore earlier that year for 400 marks.

It seems certain that Margaret Lowe's father was Michael Lowe, the sole Lowe to be mentioned as a tenant of Tymore and the only Lowe resident at Tymore whose will was filed with Prerogative court of Canterbury in the relevant period. The detail of the will makes clear that he was the father-in-law of Edward Bromley. Written in July 1593, shortly after Margaret's marriage, and proved on 13 Feb 1594, it refers to two sons-in-law, George Abney and Mr. Bromley, and three daughters, Margery, Margaret, and Katherine. In his will Michael Lowe mentions his study in the Inner Temple, London, and his law books, as well as his study in Tymore, Staffordshire. His daughter Margery married George Abney and Margaret married Edward Bromley. Katherine was unmarried at the time of writing. Large numbers of relatives are mentioned in his will including Michael Lowe, a nephew and namesake, who received a considerable bequest.

It is known that Michael Lowe's wife, Margaret, was buried on 1 April 1584. She was the daughter of Simon Biddulph, a mercer of Lichfield, just as Michael was the son of a Lichfield mercer, Humphrey Lowe.

Hence the parents of Margaret Bromley née Lowe were:

- Michael Lowe (died 1593-4), son of Humphrey and Joan Lowe of Lichfield.
- Margaret Biddulph (died 1584), daughter of Simon and Margaret Biddulph of Lichfield.

Margaret Bromley's date of birth is unknown, but as her sole marriage was in 1593 it was probably in the early 1570s. Margaret's immediate family, if related to the Lowes of Enville, as seems possible, were a very junior branch of the family. They had only recently become fairly substantial landed gentry with interests in several parts of Staffordshire and neighbouring Derbyshire. However, Michael Lowe's background lay in the urban ruling group in Lichfield, rather than the landed gentry, and both his considerable wealth and enhanced status were the outcome of his career as a lawyer. Humphrey Lowe and Simon Biddulph or Biddle, Margaret Bromley's grandfathers, both appear repeatedly in the lists of the town's officials, particularly the bailiffs, as do her uncle and cousin, both also called Simon Biddulph. There is evidence that the small, close group of families that dominated Lichfield was strongly Protestant even during the Marian persecutions. Margaret's grandmothers, Margaret Biddulph and Joan Lowe, are listed among the supporters of Joyce Lewis a Protestant martyr burnt at Lichfield in 1557. The Biddulphs, as much as the Lowes, acquired country properties close to their urban base, with substantial estates at Elmhurst Hall. and Hammerwich. Lichfield's records refer to the elder Simon Biddulph always as a mercer, while the younger is described as a gentleman, reflecting the social ascent of these merchant families into the rural landed class. However, Michael Lowe seems to have wanted a country retreat close to Lichfield rather than an investment in agriculture. At Tymore he took on only three of the farming tenants, with their tofts, cottages and orchards, and only 80 of the 300 acres of grazing. Prominent among what he leased were 100 acres of flooded land and fishing rights on the River Tame, more suitable for sport and leisure pursuits than for economic exploitation.

That Michael Lowe's focus and commitment remained at Lichfield is made clear by his 1571 grant of houses and 45 acres of land there to fund provision of clothing and coal to 12 poor local men annually – a grant that was confirmed in his will. This was the origin of Michael Lowe's Charity, which grew in income and scope over the next three centuries. In 1980 it was merged with nine other charitable funds to form Michael Lowe's and Associated Charities, which continued to emphasise provision of fuel and it plays a part in combatting poverty in the area to the present.

It seems likely that it was around Lichfield, rather than Enville, that Margaret Lowe and her sisters grew up, and that they came to maturity while living at least some of the time at Tymore. Their mother died while they were still children. Perhaps sensing that his profitable lessee was approaching death, Peter Roos sold the Tymore estate to William Skeffington in November 1593: The Skeffington family had held Fisherwick itself since the 1520s and Sir John had handed it over to his son William in 1587, so this was a natural extension to his estates in Staffordshire. In 1594 Skeffington leased the house at Tymore to Bartholomew Farmer for ten years, so it must have been vacated by Michael Lowe's family before or at that date.

As they were their father's heiresses, Margaret and her two sisters cannot have had surviving brothers. By some point in 1594 all three seem to have moved from Tymore to join their recently married husbands. Nevertheless, they seem to have remained close to easch other. Margaret and Edward Bromley were to remain childless, so her most important male relatives were to be her nephews, the sons of her sisters: these included Oliver Bromskill and James and Thomas Abney.

== Marriage ==
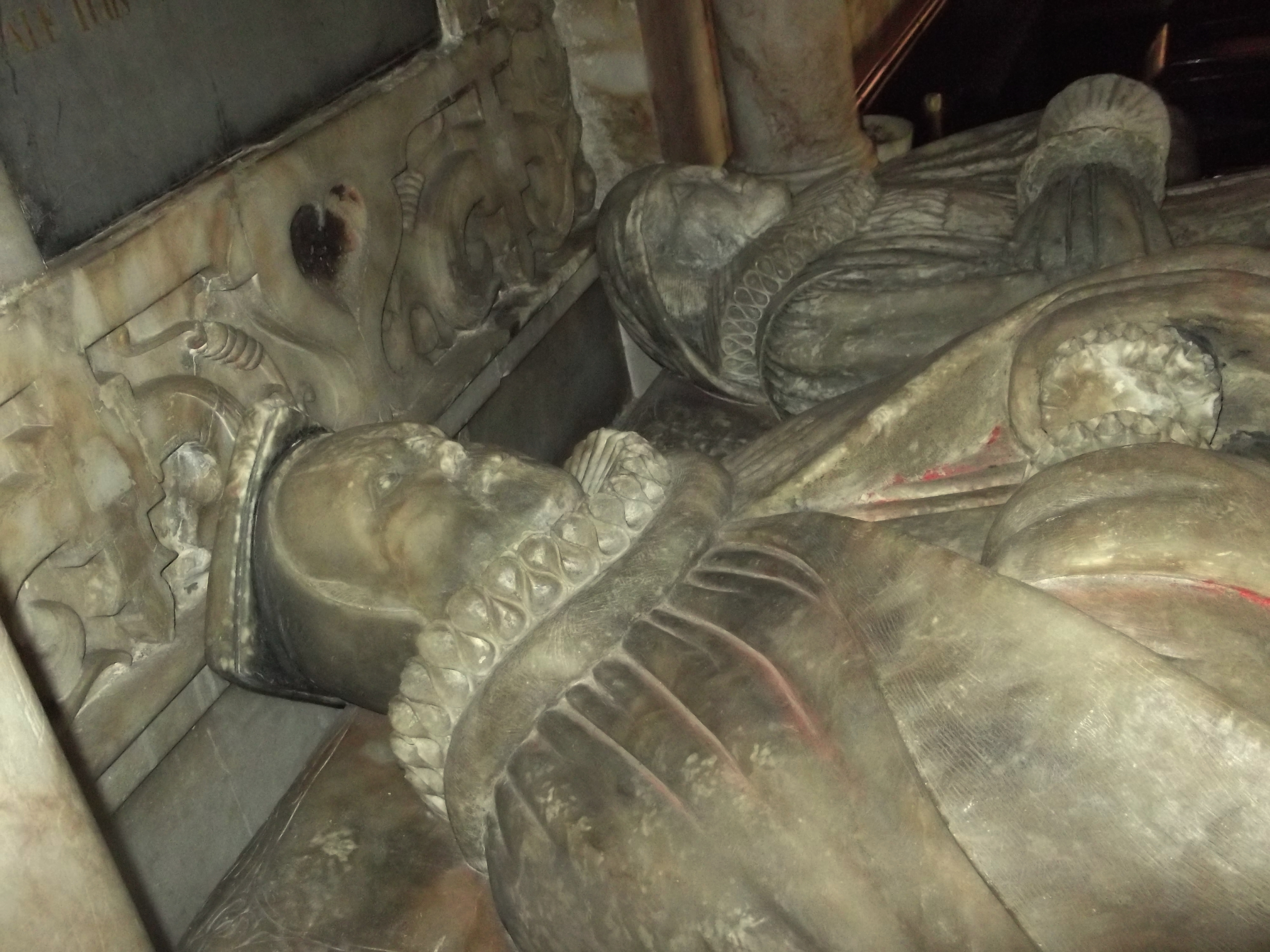
Effigies of Edward and Margaret Bromley, Worfield

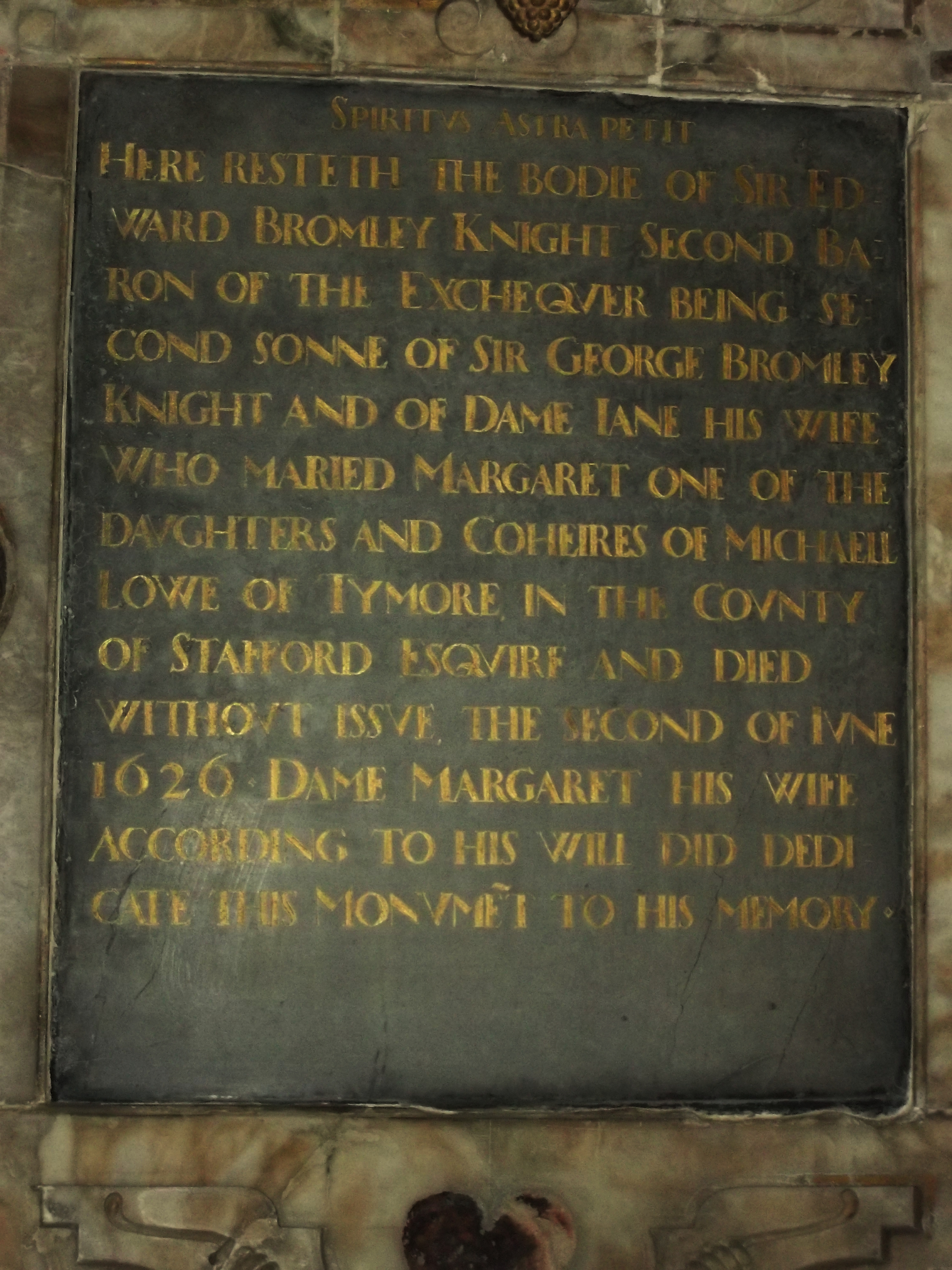
Epitaph of Edward Bromley, Worfield.

Members of the Lowe family were prominent in the Law and it was probably through connections in the profession that Margaret's marriage was arranged. On 5 July 1590, the parliament or governing body of the Inner Temple allowed Michael Lowe a chief clerk of the King's Bench, lifetime's access to a study he had helped repair above the Inn's buttery. At the same time it granted permission to use the study to his nephew, Humphrey Lowe, and to Edward Bromley, a young lawyer who was called to the bar at the same meeting. Michael Lowe, was given a supervisory role in Bromley's work in November 1590. They were joined in their chamber by George Abney, who was admitted to the Inner Temple in April 1591. and paid his share of the repair bills. It seems that the working relationship between Bromley and the Lowes was close and culminated in his marriage to Margaret Lowe, which took place on 18 April 1593. Moreover, Abney also married into the Lowe family by the same route.

Edward Bromley was a son of Sir George Bromley, a prominent politician and lawyer, a nephew of Sir Thomas Bromley, a former Lord Chancellor, and had already been returned three times as MP for Bridgnorth. However, he was Sir George's second son, with only a small inheritance of property at Shifnal and Bridgnorth. His and his wife's status was transformed in February 1610, when, in a few weeks, he was made Serjeant-at-law and a Baron of the Exchequer, inherited the family estates on the death of his nephew and was knighted.

The couple remained childless. When Sir Edward Bromley died in 1626, disputes about the inheritance of the family estates had already begun. The codicil to his will showed that he had been forced to sacrifice some of the lands he had intended as part of Lady Margaret's jointure to placate the Davenports, his great-niece and her husband, who were ultimately to acquire the main estate at Hallon, next to Worfield, after protracted litigation. As compensation, he left her all his moveable property, although he had originally intended to give her only the use of it during her life and the right to bequeath £400-worth in her own will. For everything not relating to the property dispute, Lady Margaret was appointed executrix. Sir Edward set aside £100 for a monument "to be set up in Shifnall Church, or elsewhere, to me and my wife Dame Margaret." However, he directed that his burial itself be "without funeral pompe," probably an indication of Puritan views. In the event, Sir Edward was buried in the church at Worfield, where Margaret subsequently had the prescribed monument built, with an inscription attesting her role: "Dame Margaret his wife according to his will did dedicate This monument to his memory." Margaret is portrayed lying at Edward's side but was never buried in the tomb.

== Sheriffhales ==
The Bromleys had property at Sheriffhales, a parish then divided between Shropshire and Staffordshire, and Sir Edward had left a small sum for the poor of the parish. Lady Margaret settled at Sheriffhales after his death and it became her base for the support of Puritan ministers. Her presence locally is first noted in the parish register in 1630, when her servant Robert Cowper died. She seems to have taken steps to manage and invest her wealth. In 1636, for example, she leased a meadow at Worfield from a consortium of businessmen: William Whitmore, George Whitmore and John Weld of Willey.

Benjamin Brook, the nonconformist minister and historian, wrote that Margaret Bromley was "many years famous for promoting, by her influence and practice, the interests of the Redeemer's kingdom, and the genuine principles of the reformation." Brook's estimate was based on the testimony of Samuel Clarke, a Puritan minister of the period, who wrote of Margaret Bromley in 1651, while she was still alive, that she

deserves an honourable remembrance, because she was a constant and unparallel'd favourer of all good ministers and People, being both tender-hearted and open handed towards such who suffered under Prelatical pressures and otherwise.

This she did essentially by providing accommodation for persecuted ministers and a platform for their preaching, and by making her home available for religious exercises held by what appear to have been regional networks of Puritan ministers. Of those mentioned by Clark and Brook, Julines Herring seems to have been central: he was the public preacher appointed to St Alkmund's Church, Shrewsbury, by the town's corporation; John Ball was an old friend of Herring, ordained alongside him by an Irish bishop in 1610 to avoid subscription to the Thirty-Nine Articles; Robert Nicolls of Wrenbury was Herring's brother-in-law; Thomas Pierson of Brampton Bryan was one of the ministers Herring invited, along with Nicolls, to preach in Shrewsbury. Another who took refuge at Sheriffhales was Thomas Langley of Middlewich. Nicolls had clashed with the ecclesiastical authorities over ceremonial practice since Thomas Morton's time as Bishop of Chester. He died while taking refuge at Sheriffhales in 1630, leaving polemical writings that would not be published until 1660, attacking in particular signing with the Cross in baptism, the surplice and kneeling to receive Communion.

Clarke related that the Puritan preachers residing with Margaret Bromley were able to deliver sermons on special occasions in the local parish church. The circumstances locally were unusual. The advowson of the parish was held by the Aston family of Tixall and both incumbents during Margaret Bromley's time were presented by Sir Walter Aston, a noted diplomat who had converted to Roman Catholicism in 1623. The vicar from 1622 was William Jeffray or Jeffreye, Aston's chaplain but an inexperienced cleric, straight out of university. In 1631 he was replaced by John Morton, whose attitude seems to have been ambiguous or possibly subject to the "Vicar of Bray" spirit apparently common in the region at the time: he preached bitterly against the Parliamentarians at the opening of the English Civil War but remained in place throughout the Presbyterian experiment of the 1640s to die in office in 1649. By far the most important landowner locally was Sir Richard Leveson, who held the manor of Sheriffhales and the neighbouring estate of Lilleshall. It is possible he was sympathetic or neutral: his parents, particularly his mother, Christian Mildmay, had been of Puritan background, and he was to take the royalist side in the Civil War only after efforts at neutrality and mediation. Moreover, he was preoccupied with his Trentham Estate in the 1630s.

Richard Baxter affirmed that Margaret Bromley gave a home to her nephew Oliver Bromskill or Brumskill. He was a clergyman, educated at Christ's College, Cambridge and ordained as priest by Bishop Morton at Eccleshall in 1620, when he subscribed to the Thirty-Nine Articles. However, the Clergy of the Church of England database has nothing further on him. The Victoria County History for Warwickshire says he was curate at Sheriffhales, citing Baxter. However, Baxter does not mention his position at Sheriffhales and the editor of the parish register gave a list of curates, on which he does not figure. Samuel Clarke implies the contrary, stating that Margaret Bromley's supportive relatives in Sheriffhales were "Parishioners of the Congregation." Nevertheless, Oliver Bromskill and his wife Sarah are well-attested in the parish register during the 1630s. A daughter, Sarah, was baptised by John Morton, the vicar, on 25 April 1633 but buried on 19 August of the same year. A son, Epaphras was baptised on 27 April 1634 and reached the age of three, being buried on the same date as his sister, 19 August, in 1637. Four further children, George ( baptised 28 June 1635), Samuel (baptized 10 July 1636), Margaret (baptised 11 February 1638), and John (baptised 4 August 1639), all survived to receive bequests in Margaret Bromley's will. There is nothing to indicate that Oliver Bromskill was living in the parish of Sheriffhales in anything but a private capacity: none of the register entries gives his occupation or status, as was customary. It was known for displaced Puritan ministers to assist in pastoral work in a private capacity, staying with a relative, as Herring did at Wrenbury, where he stayed with Nicolls' widow after he fled Shrewsbury in 1635.

== Flight ==
The deteriorating political situation forced Bromskill to flee, although it is not known at what point he was followed by Margaret Bromley and other family members. As the country drifted into war during 1642, the ecclesiastical situation became polarised, with clergy forced to take sides, a situation intensified in Shropshire by Francis Ottley's royalist coup in Shrewsbury, which led to the arrival of the Charles I's army on 20 September. Puritan clergy who were committed to Parliament, even those in the rural parishes, like Samuel Fisher of Upton Magna were forced to flee. When the king's army headed south, Richard Baxter was displaced from Kidderminster and fled east, taking refuge at Coventry, after witnessing the aftermath of the Battle of Edgehill. It was there that he met Bromskill, one of "about thirty worthy ministers in the City, who fled thither for safety from Soldiers and Popular Fury, as I had done, though they never meddled in the wars." Baxter comments on Bromskill that he: "lived with that Eminent Saint the old Lady Bromley, Widow to Judge Bromley, whose only discernible fault to me was too much Humility and low thought of her self." As Baxter uses the simple past tense, there is ambiguity about whether he understood Bromskill to be living with Margaret Bromley at Coventry or in the period before. However, it is certain that she, together Bromskill's wife and children did move east to join him at some stage in the Civil War, as they were next recorded at Loughborough in Leicestershire.

== Loughborough ==
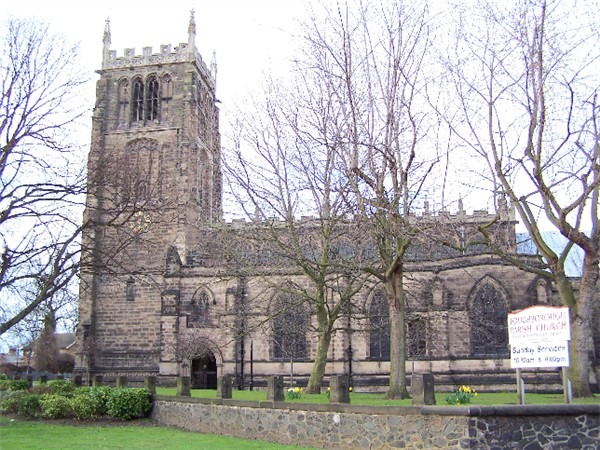
All Saints Church, Loughborough.

Margaret Bromley moved to Loughborough to live with Bromskill and his family by the later stages of the Civil War: this was remarked by Edmund Calamy in his famous account of the ejected ministers. Bromskill was appointed or, as royalist writers like to say, "intruded" as rector of Loughborough Parish Church by the county's parliamentary committee on 26 June 1647, during the period when Parliament was trying to impose a Presbyterian polity on the country. The living was reckoned as worth £300 per year, a very substantial income. Bromskill was sufficiently wealthy to buy the Loughborough manor house from Ferdinando Hastings, 6th Earl of Huntingdon, in 1654. Nicholas Hall, the existing rector, was displaced, although he was to regain his position when Bromskill was removed in the Great Ejection of 1662, and Hall was treated as the existing incumbent when he subscribed to the Act of Uniformity.

== Death ==
Margaret Bromley died in 1657 and was buried at Loughborough on 23 March. In her will she asked for no solemnity of any kind, specifically prohibiting the use of bells, and asked that no relative be sent for, apart from her nephew Abney: she left small bequests to both James and Thomas Abney but it was James who was appointed executor, along with Sarah Bromskill. Samuel Bromskill was given the proceeds of a lease she had recently taken out. John and George Bromskill were given £50 each, but Margaret Bromskill was to receive £100. There were other small bequests and the residue was to go the Oliver and Sarah Bromskill. The will was proved on 28 May 1657.

== Mapping Margaret Bromley's life ==
Places associated with Margaret Bromley
Location	Dates	Event	Approximate coordinates
Enville, Staffordshire	15th century	Family origins	52°28′44″N 2°15′29″W
Fisherwick	1580s	Family home	52°40′58″N 1°43′31″W
Shifnal	1593–1610	Residence	52°40′02″N 2°22′22″W
Hallon, Worfield, now Davenport House	1610–26	Edward Bromley's chief estate, disputed.	52°33′23″N 2°21′55″W
Sheriffhales	1626–c.1642	Base for Puritan ministers.	52°42′19″N 2°21′33″W
Coventry	c.1642–7	Refuge during Civil War.	52°24′28″N 1°30′28″W
Loughborough	1647–57	Residence, burial place.	52°46′30″N 1°12′19″W
