= Francis Ottley =

English Royalist politician and soldier

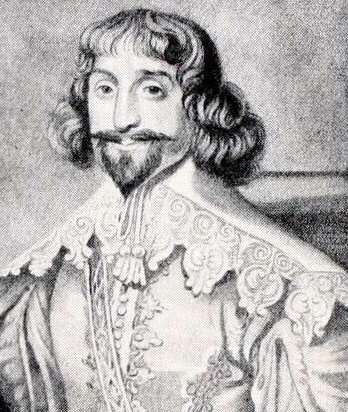
- Francis Ottley, from a family portrait of about 1636, now in Shrewsbury Museum and Art Gallery

Military governor of Shrewsbury
- Incumbent
- Assumed office February 1643
- Monarch: Charles I

High Sheriff of Shropshire (Royalist)
- In office 1644–1646 Serving with Thomas Mytton (Parliamentarian)

Personal details
- Born: circa 1600 Pitchford Hall, Shropshire
- Died: 11 September 1649 London
- Spouse: Lucy Edwards
- Children: 3, including Richard
- Relatives: Sir Thomas Wolryche, 1st Baronet (brother-in-law); John Wolryche (nephew); Humphrey Mackworth (cousin)
- Profession: Politician, soldier

Sir Francis Ottley (1600/1601–11 September 1649) was an English Royalist politician and soldier who played an important part in the English Civil War in Shropshire. He was military governor of Shrewsbury during the early years of the war and later served as the Royalist High Sheriff of the county and helped negotiate the surrender of Bridgnorth. His final years were spent in a prolonged and complex struggle to free his estates from sequestration.

== Background, early life and education ==
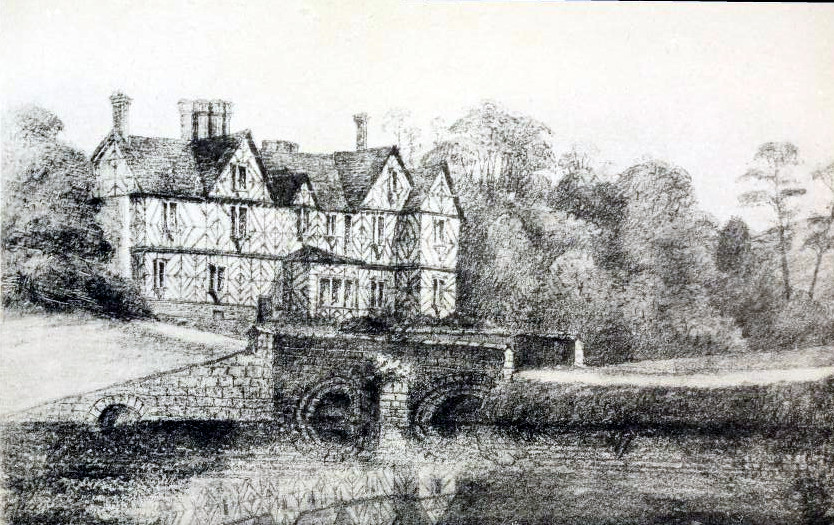
Pitchford Hall, Shropshire, home of the Royalist Ottley family in the 17th century. Pictured in 1901

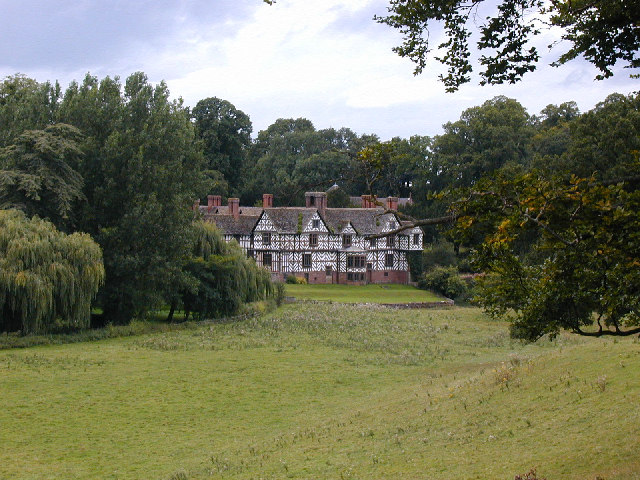
Pitchford Hall, photographed 2005.

Francis Ottley's parents were:

- Thomas Ottley of Pitchford, Shropshire

The Ottley family belonged to the middling landed gentry and claimed descent from the Ottleys of Oteley, near Ellesmere, Shropshire. However they made their fortune as part of the powerful merchant class of the town of Shrewsbury itself, the wealth of which derived from its monopoly in the finishing of Welsh cloth. As early as 1444 a Thomas Ottley was one of the aldermen assisting the bailiffs in the government of Shrewsbury. He bought Pitchford Hall in 1473, and also had a house in Calais, from which he could seek outlets for finished cloth. His son William was High Sheriff of Shropshire in 1500, marking the definitive acceptance of the Ottleys into the landed gentry, the dominant class in Shropshire, a county which had no resident aristocracy in the 16th century.

- Mary Gifford, daughter of Roger Gifford, MD

Roger Gifford was a noted doctor, who was appointed Elizabeth I's physician ordinary in 1587. He became wealthy and served as MP for Old Sarum. He was reported to be a Catholic but this is uncertain.

Francis Ottley was educated at Shrewsbury School from the age of ten. He entered Lincoln College, Oxford, matriculating at the age of 17 on 4 December 1618, the same day as his younger brother, Richard. While Richard stayed on to graduate, Francis left without a degree for legal training, and the Inner Temple registered his admission in November 1619, incorrectly naming his father as Robert. In 1621 he married Lucy, the already widowed daughter of Thomas Edwards, who was High Sheriff of Shropshire at the time.

== Royalist seizure of Shrewsbury ==
Ottley was already active in local politics before the outbreak of the English Civil War in 1642, so quickly emerged as a leading Royalist within Shropshire, playing a key role in the military conquest of the county by Charles I. As newspapers were not yet in circulation in the Midlands, he kept in touch with the national situation by having an agent in London, Robert Browne, send him occasional newsletters, summarising developments in the capital, but also in provincial centres as news came in. Letters from Browne still survive, relaying such news as the crisis in May 1641 over the execution of Thomas Wentworth, 1st Earl of Strafford and, a year later, the first hostilities between Charles I and Parliament at the Siege of Hull.

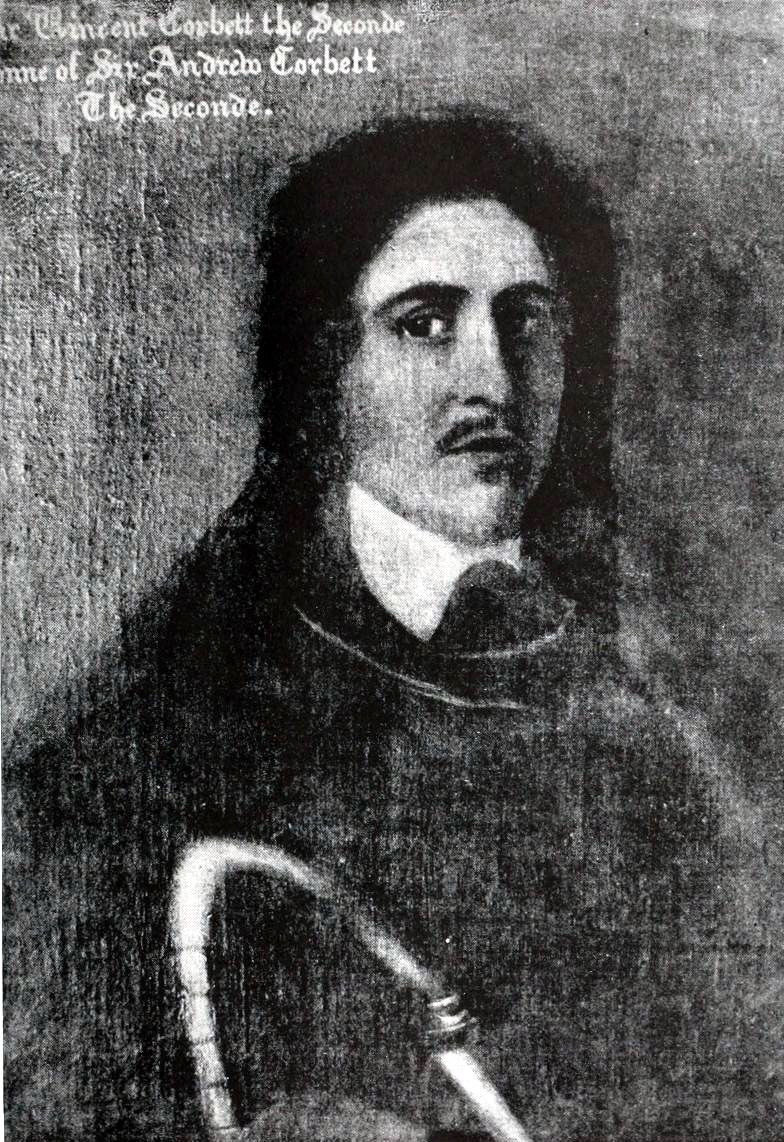
Sir Vincent Corbet, Ottley's principal Royalist collaborator in Shropshire during the early days of the Civil War and later a cavalry commander.

The town and corporation of Shrewsbury were deeply divided. A political and ideological conflict between Puritans and Laudians had resulted in a battle of the pulpits for more than two decades. During the summer of 1642 parliament and the king instigated rival mobilisations, the former under the Militia Ordinance, the latter under Commissions of array. Ottley received a commission from the king, dated 22 June at York, to mobilise the county's Trained bands by sending a warrant to the High Sheriff. On the other side, a group of Shrewsbury aldermen petitioned parliament on 16 July to recognise a militia that had begun to gather under the command of Thomas Hunt. Parliament authorised the training of militia for the defence of Shrewsbury and, under an act of 22 July, deputed three MPs, William Pierrepont, Sir John Corbet, and Richard More to establish its military control of Shropshire. The Drapers' Company responded with contributions of money, silver plate and equipment for the parliamentary cause. However, Ottley seized the initiative and disrupted the parliamentary muster on 1 August. Royalist forces drilled the following day under Sir Vincent Corbet of Moreton Corbet.

A declaration of loyalty to the king was issued by the grand jury at Shrewsbury assizes on 8 August. Acknowledging that their Worcestershire neighbours had been first to pledge their support, the Shropshire gentry and burgesses declared:

But wee alsoe doe with all thankfullnes and unanimously acknowledge our selves sensible of the good lawes which through his maiesties goodnes hath ben enacted this parliament ... And wee doe declare that we wilbee ready to attend and obey his maiestie in all lawfull wayes ffor the putting of the Countrey in a posture of Armes for the defence of his maiestie and the peace of this Kingdome And doe resolve according to our oathes of Supremacye and allegiance late protestacons to adventure our lives and fortunes in the defence of his Royall and sacred person...

Ottley was one of those who signed, although his name was close to the bottom of the list of gentry, while his brother-in-law Sir Thomas Wolryche, 1st Baronet was close to the top. Ottley sent out messengers to carry the resolution to gentry in outlying areas to keep them informed and supportive. However, the situation remained confused and undecided for several weeks, with many of the Shropshire gentry hoping that mediation would avert open conflict. Sir Richard Newport appeared on the scene as a mediator between the two sides but he was secretly in close contact with Ottley and his friend Thomas Eyton of Eyton upon the Weald Moors through his son, Francis Newport. and had pledged £6000 to the king for a barony.

Hopes of a peaceful resolution faded quickly after the king raised his standard at Nottingham on 22 August, effectively declaring war on Parliament. Ottley was in contact with a group of Anglican clergy who were plotting to come out firmly on the king's side. They met in Shrewsbury to issue their own declaration on 24 August, although the recorded signatories include none of the ministers of Shrewsbury itself. Shrewsbury corporation declared a policy of neutrality and non-resistance on 30 August. Ottley plotted to bring the king to Shrewsbury to take advantage of the situation, using Thomas Eyton as intermediary, although he also received information from other informants, like Sir Thomas Hanmer, the king's cupbearer. By 4 September Eyton had met the king at Nottingham and passed on to Ottley the king's summons to a meeting. In the meantime, on 10 September, the king wrote, authorising him to raise 200 infantry to take Shrewsbury. and, in an accompanying letter, Edward Hyde assured him of the king's personal, as well as official, concern and regard for him. On 13 September, the Royalist field army set off westward and reached Derby on the same day, where the king received an assurance from Ottley that the town was "at his devotion." On 15 September, Shrewsbury council agreed to give the king free access to the town and to “make the best enterteynment these troublesome times aforde.” The king had reached Uttoxeter by the time Ottley was able to meet him. An address was drafted for the king to read out at Wellington, where he rallied his forces on 19 September. On 20 September the king and his army entered Shrewsbury to a welcome from its people, although they had little choice in the face of overwhelming force. Ottley was knighted by the king at Shrewsbury on 21 September 1642.

The king was based at Shrewsbury until 12 October 1642, shadowed by the main Parliamentarian army, under the Lord General, Robert Devereux, 3rd Earl of Essex, which had marched from Northampton to Worcester to block his progress southward. The Royalist soldiers billeted in the town were ill-paid and took to extortion and looting. Soon this spread to the surrounding countryside of north Shropshire. As early as 28 September Ottley was sent a complaint by John Weever of Market Drayton, alleging that he had only narrowly escaped having his home looted by Royalist soldiers and that many of his neighbours had not been so lucky, although they were “noe Rounheades but most duitefull subjects to his ma'tie.” Weever and other complainants had already begun to address themselves to Ottley, although he was not yet formally head of the garrison at Shrewsbury. However, there was informal recognition of his leading role: a proclamation, apparently from the king, notified all gentlemen and soldiers that they should be ready to rally in case of disturbance signalled by “the lawful warning of Captain ffrancis Ottley his Drome (drum)”.

== Quest for the governorship ==
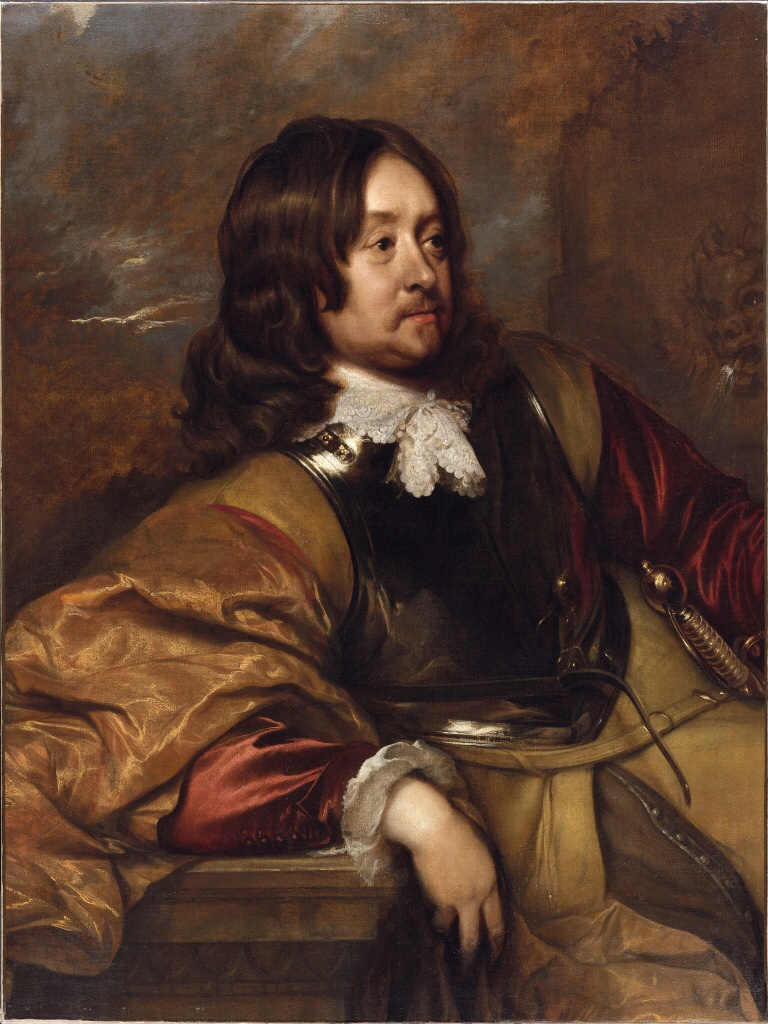
Edward Hyde, later Earl of Clarendon, a moderate voice and Ottley's main supporter in the Royalist camp.

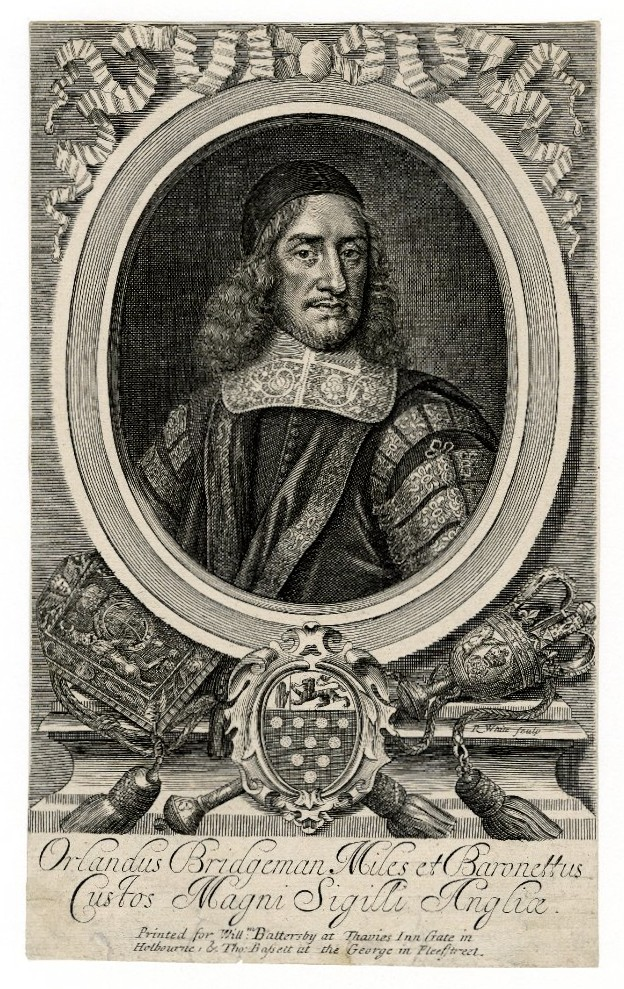
Sir Orlando Bridgeman, a Cheshire Royalist politician and future Chief Justice of the Common Pleas and Lord Keeper of the Great Seal. He was in close contact with Ottley during the Civil War.

Major General Sir William Brereton, most successful Parliamentarian commander in the Midlands, under whose protection the Shropshire committee gained a foothold at Wem.

When the king left on 12 October, embarking on the campaign that would lead to the Battle of Edgehill, Ottley had still not been appointed military governor of the town. Instead, there was an ambiguous document, signed by the king on 11 October, ordering him not to leave his residence in the county and requiring the Sheriff, JPs and other officials to aid him by protecting his "person family and Estate and every part therof against all persons Whatsoever." He was thus compelled to continue lobbying for official appointment to the post of governor. Meanwhile, however, he tried to take control of the situation. Moving south from Shrewsbury, on 14 October at Bridgnorth the king outlawed three of Shrewsbury's most prominent citizens as traitors: Thomas Hunt, Humfrey Mackworth, and Thomas Nicholls. These men immediately disappeared from the area, leaving the Royalists freer to consolidate their position.

In December Ottley, together with Eyton, Corbet and other gentry, financed the formation of a force of dragoons, which was to be commanded by Corbet. However, the initial response was poor, with only about 60 enlisted. In January 1643 Ottley renewed his campaign to be appointed governor. On 2 January he compelled all the inhabitants of Shrewsbury, on pain of death, to swear a declaration against the Parliamentary Army:

I. A. B., do in the presence of Almighty God protest and acknowledge without any mental reservation that I do detest and abhor the notorious rebellion which goes under the name of the Parliament Army, and will with my whole force and means to the uttermost of my power withstand their impious rebellion against our most gracious Sovereign Lord King Charles, our Protestant religion, our laws of the land, our just privileges of Parliament, and liberty of the subject.

This he hoped would win the king's favour and bring the coveted appointment. On 5 January Hyde wrote from Oxford, the Royalist capital, explaining the king's reluctance and promising speedy appointment if required.

If you receave not so full satisfaction by your man as you expecte, you must not attribute it to any negligence of your frends, or any disesteem in his Ma^{ty} towards you. I assure you the King hath a very just sense of your meritt and lookes upon the service of that towne (where he received so great testimonyes of duty and Loyalty) as the effect of your Care and industry, and therefore you may believe he will never be unwilling to grante you any addition of power, who imploy it so well to his advantage, but in this business of Govenour he makes some pawse upon this scruple, he hath had of late ill luck in making Govern^{rs} of Cities and Townes, and tho' he hath always chosen loved and popular men for those places, yet private differences have so farr grown, that he hath been in danger to loose the Corporation. Now he says you are Comaunder of the Armes of the Town, and already have all authority to that purpose, but he fears if he should send you an absolute Pattent of Governour, it may some day discontent the Corporation, however he resolves there shall be no other Governour but you, and if you and the Towne think it necessary that you should have an immediate Pattent lett us hear from you and it shall be dispatch'd...

However, Ottley had other informants at Oxford and elsewhere. A letter despatched the following day by Thomas Bushell made clear that there were others lobbying for the post at Shrewsbury. Apparently Ottley insisted on the appointment, as he was rewarded with formal appointment as governor later that month. A consignment of high quality carbines despatched to Oxford on 11 January must have helped, for Hyde soon wrote back asking for more and offering to raise the necessary money. A letter from Hyde, written 9 February, significantly alludes to Ottley's commission, possibly still en route, before bemoaning his apparent inability to provide the promised arms.

== Complaints, opposition and repression ==
The economy of Shrewsbury was greatly disrupted by the war and the war industries, including the manufacture of muskets begun by Ottley and the royalist propaganda press installed by the king, took up little of the slack. Unsurprisingly, there was still a large body of opinion uncommitted to either side and wanting only a return to peace and business as normal. Jonathan Langley, a native of Shrewsbury stranded in the Parliamentary stronghold of Birmingham, wrote to Ottley of his desire to return to his home and family, and pointing out that "my protestation already taken binds me both to King and to parliament." Trade was greatly impeded by the necessity to obtain a pass from Ottley for any journey outside the town. The depredations of Royalist soldiers impeded trade and inconvenienced citizens, creating a stream of complaints to the governor. On 7 January it was Peter Venables, an important Cheshire Royalist requesting release of his sister's goods seized by Ottley's soldiers. On 28 January John Birch, a Bristol wine merchant, wanted to know what had happened to four butts of sack, worth £64, and requesting restitution or recompense. Some of the complainants could be ignored. Birch's complaint was particularly audacious, as his arrest had been ordered by Ottley and he had escaped only because he was a purveyor of wines to the royalist gentry of Bridgnorth, including Wolryche, the governor. He was soon in arms on the side of Parliament, and proved a redoubtable Roundhead commander in Gloucestershire and Herefordshire. It was not so easy to shrug off a letter from the king himself, alleging that Ottley's men had purloined goods belonging to an influential Staffordshire wool merchant and demanding they be released forthwith. Moreover, Hyde wrote complaining that Mr. Acherley, in whose house he had stayed the previous September, was being subjected to a campaign of intimidation.

Harassed by conflicting demands, Ottley's position was slowly but steadily undermined by both the opposition and his own side. He frequently received news of events in Cheshire and in the north of Shropshire from Orlando Bridgeman, who seems to have been a close friend: however, the news was not always good, and there was usually a request for more men and materials to fight the war. At the end of January 1643, Ottley received a flurry of letters reflecting the first serious impact of a Parliamentary fightback, under Sir William Brereton. Most disturbing was a letter from Sir Vincent Corbet, beseeching him to send to Whitchurch not soldiers but as many surgeons as he could possibly provide. In February Parliament established a Shropshire committee to take control of the county. and in April it was federated with its counterparts in Warwickshire and Staffordshire. The quickening pace of conflict brought in a flurry of complaints and entreaties. William Watkins, an enterprising small farmer of Shotton, protested bitterly that he was heavily taxed to pay for hostilities while his less industrious neighbours seemed to pay nothing. Lettice Corbet, daughter-in-law of the Parliamentarian leader Sir John Corbet but a royalist, wrote to reclaim possessions she had left in Ottley's care, fearing that she would be cut off by the advance of Lord Brooke's Parliamentarian forces in Staffordshire. The danger proved real and enemy forces reached Newport, prompting Ottley to an emergency mobilisation of Shrewsbury's dragoons and their retainers for a possible counter-move.

The lands of Parliamentarians that fell in the royalist-controlled areas were sequestered. The seizure of Humphrey Mackworth's lands created problems for Ottley, made all the sharper by the fact that they were, by contemporary reckoning, cousins. The seizure had been made without regard to anyone else's interests in the lands. In March Ottley was compelled to issue an order allowing the royalist William Browne to draw £70 a year from Mackworth's confiscated estates, as he had bought an interest in them through an indenture of mortgage. Shortly afterwards he received a cutting but polite letter from Mackworth's mother, Dorothy Gorton, asking that he “not let me suffer for my sonns esteemed fault.” She was the widow of Ottley's own uncle and claimed that she held a jointure in the sequestered lands.

Open discontent was building up in the town and its surroundings and Ottley took repressive measures. He issued an order for the detention of George Baxter, the widely respected puritan rector of Little Wenlock, who had fled the area. Baxter had apparently returned secretly to the area and was to be brought to Shrewsbury for interrogation on "all such matters as maybe objected against him on his ma'ties behalfe." At the Spring assizes of 1643, all ten indicted were charged with offences of disloyalty. The list began with William Webb, “charged with speacking of ill and malyticus speeches against the King's Ma^{tie},” and the other accused were mostly men who had spoken out of turn, although the tailor Andrew Mills of Newport had induced a royalist soldier to desert to Brereton's forces. Birch was on the list but he cannot have been in custody as he was in action with the Roundheads at Bristol on 7 March. One Robert Corbett, accused of “speeking certain words tending to treason,” but bailed by Lord Newport, may have been Robert Corbet of Stanwardine, a cousin of Sir Vincent and a notable lawyer: by the time of the assizes he was with the Parliamentary committee for the county. On 17 March Ottley issued a proscription list, ordering the arrest of 43 people for disaffection towards the regime. These seem to have been mainly minor tradesmen and farmers.

== Royalist reorganisation and retrenchment ==
The royalists were now feeling much more threatened militarily and were not rising well to the challenge. 17 March brought requests for reinforcement from Sir Vincent Corbet in the wake of a defeat at Middlewich. Two days later William Blunden, Ottley's cousin and commander of the small royalist cavalry force from Bishop's Castle, wrote to him in confusion, trying to find out what his orders were. He enclosed a letter for the sheriff, asking Ottley to open it if necessary, and in this he reported that his troops were completely out of gunpowder and ammunition. The very next day brought news of the inconclusive Battle of Hopton Heath, in which the royalist commander, Spencer Compton, 2nd Earl of Northampton, had been killed. Orlando Bridgeman wrote to get Ottley to redistribute shot, grenades and artillery, both to make the best of their insufficient supplies and to protect them from capture, and he revealed that they still needed to pay for much of what they had. Ottley duly saw to the transfer of cannon between royalist forces and also used his powers as governor to appoint Richard Millward as an ensign to train an infantry company, commanded by Richard Ottley, his own brother.

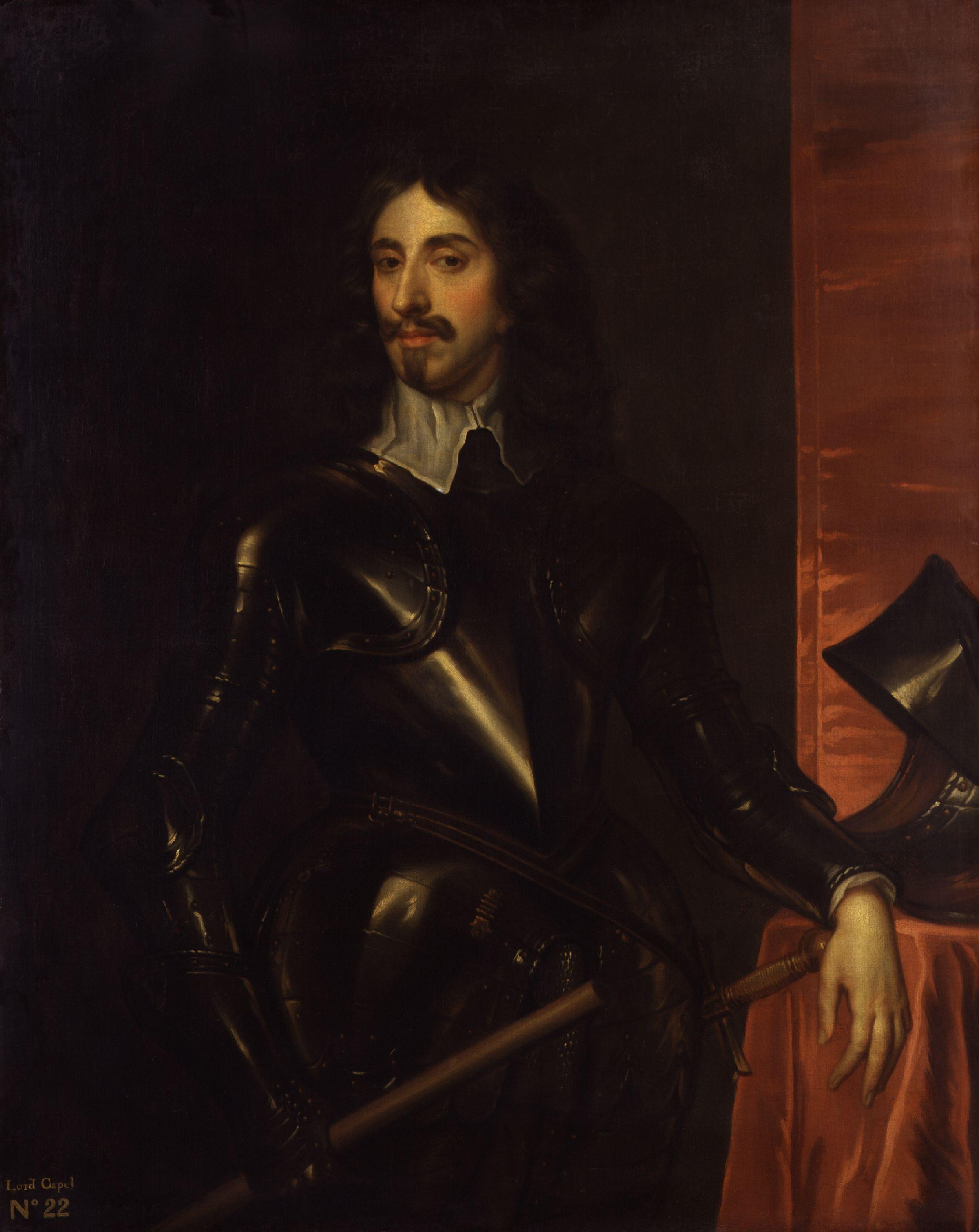
Lord Capel, from April 1643 royalist commander in Worcestershire, Shropshire, Cheshire and North Wales.

However, the royalist government had realised that local and informal initiatives were proving ineffectual and, by 1 April, had appointed Lord Capel as regional commander, with the title of lieutenant general. Capel wrote to Ottley to introduce himself and to arrange for the storage of gunpowder at Shrewsbury, sending his own troops to guard it. At a council of war, held in Shrewsbury on 3 April, Ottley was made responsible for the safety of the magazine. Capel began to harass Ottley for funds. First he asked him to ensure that those who had promised to maintain the Shrewsbury dragoons produce what they owed: some of the soldiers had failed to turn up for service. He followed this by insisting on a systematic survey of the resources of the townspeople to see what could be extracted: he deputed the lawyer Arthur Trevor to oversee the process: he attached a postscript demanding a huge quantity of musket ammunition. Within a week the king wrote demanding he procure supplies of flax and hemp to make matches for the muskets and artillery.

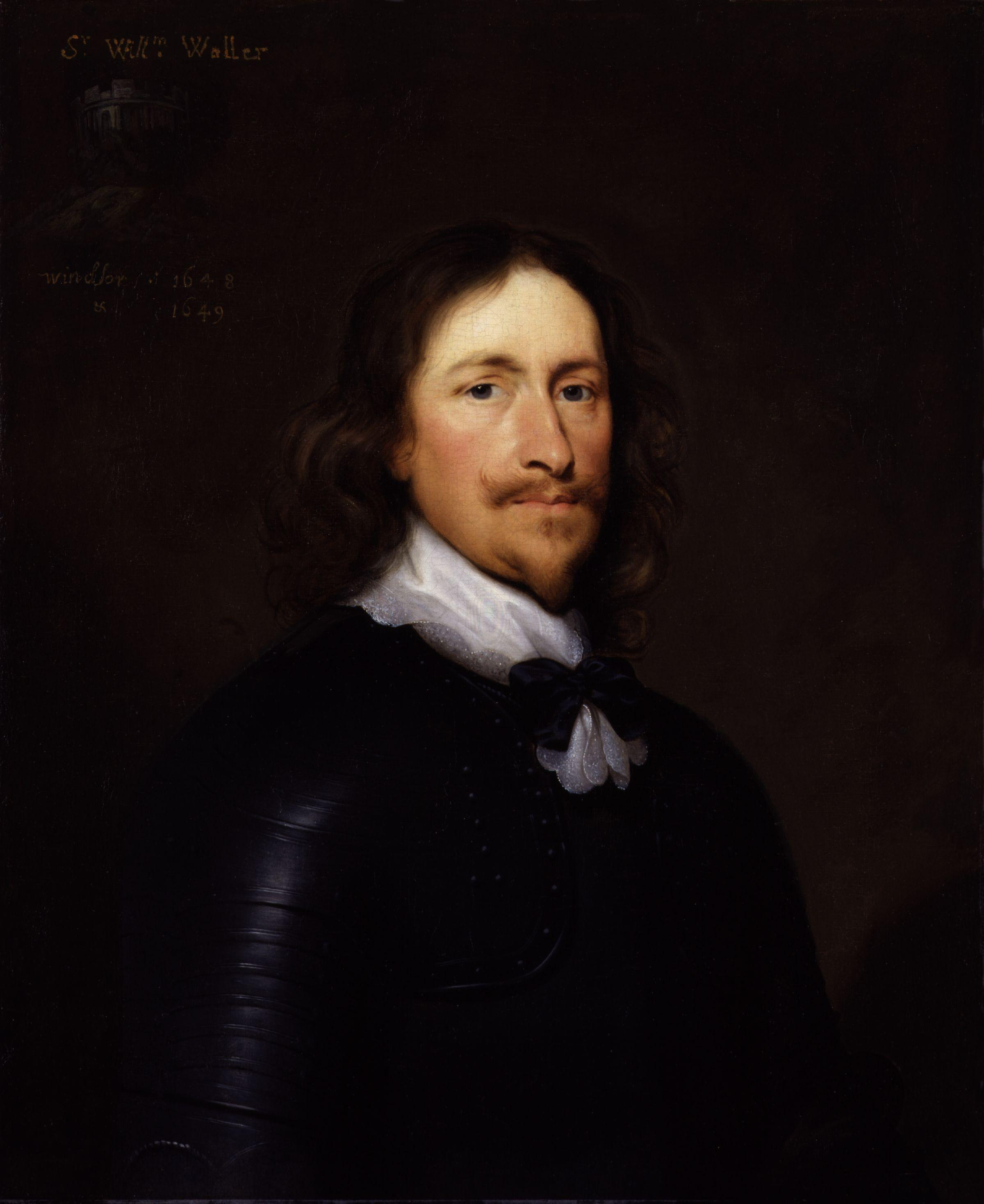
William Waller, Parliamentarian commander in the south-west

The more vigorous military and organisational measures seem not to have steadied royalist nerves and Parliamentarian forces used propaganda skilfully to keep their opponents on edge. On 6 May, William Waller, commanding Parliament's forces in the south-west, issued a demand to the clergy of Shropshire that they take an oath to parliament, intimating that he proposed to drive right across the Midlands to join Brereton. On 16 May Sir Richard Leveson wrote to ask Ottley's help in moving his household goods from Lilleshall Abbey into Shrewsbury for safe keeping, in view of the vulnerability to attack in the countryside. On the same day Capel wrote, apparently to put Ottley on guard against possible disturbances or attacks under cover of the May Fair, as his next letter congratulated the governor on his precautions. Four days later he ordered Ottley, with the help of Sir John Mennes and Sir Thomas Scriven, to carry out a thorough review and upgrade of the fortifications, security arrangements and supply situation. Shrewsbury was to be equipped to resist a siege of at least six months. He was given plenary powers over the inhabitants to implement his plans. It seems that Capel was at this time acquiring considerable regard for Ottley's efficiency and he kept him informed of wider developments: an account of his attempt to save Warrington from capture stressed success in minor skirmishes after the event rather than the loss of the town to the Parliamentarians. However, there was soon news of royalist success in driving back the Parliamentarians in Worcestershire.

Capel continued to put the region on a war footing. On 13 June he demanded two horses from each gentry family Apparently a good deal of casual requisitioning was going on and Sir Paul Harris, an enthusiastic but unpopular royalist soon wrote to tell Ottley that soldiers from the Shrewsbury garrison had seized his weapons and threatened to break open his stored possessions. Richard Herbert wrote from Bromfield on behalf of a neighbour whose apprentice had been conscripted, to the serious detriment of his business. The economic and psychological impact of the war was variable: at about the same time Lettice Corbet was asking Ottley for safe-conduct passes and official protection so that her servants and mother could mount a business and shopping trip to London, the very centre of Parliamentarian power.

Pressure from the parliamentarians on the royalists of Shropshire was increasingly matched by that from within royalist ranks on Ottley himself. By late June, despite some royalist successes in Staffordshire, Capel was writing of his worries about the movements of Sir John Corbet, who had been appointed head of the parliamentary committee and titular colonel-in-chief of any forces it raised. There were rumours he was close by, perhaps near Tamworth. In July there were rumours of plots among the townspeople of Shrewsbury. A letter arrived, perhaps from Oxford, purporting to be a warning from a friend but reporting that there were plots to replace Ottley as governor and suggesting that he was not issuing sufficient propaganda to counteract the widespread Parliamentarian pamphleteering.

Around the end of August the parliamentary committee, with the support of Brereton gained a foothold in its native county, occupying the small, unfortified market town of Wem. The Royalists were compelled to spend large sums of money rearming their forces in Shropshire. On 28 September the king authorised payment of £965 10s. to Francis Walker for manufacturing artillery and ammunition at Bouldon in Shropshire – most of it for delivery to Shrewsbury and Bridgnorth. In October the Parliamentarians at Wem, only 300 strong and now commanded by Colonel Thomas Mytton, saw off an assault, by 5000 of Capel's troops - partly because the townspeople, including many women, rallied to their aid.

Soon after this failure, a widespread plot against Royalist control was uncovered in Shrewsbury. The mayor's accounts contain an entry for the building of gibbets, dated 29 December, probably indicating a considerable number of executions around that time. However, this was not enough for his Royalist critics. A letter sent on behalf of the king alluded to the need to be meticulous in publicising royal proclamations, although it appears that Ottley had not shirked in this.

== Dismissal and after ==
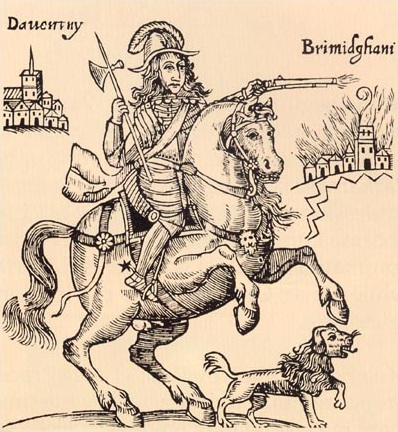
Prince Rupert, portrayed in Parliamentarian propaganda as the author of atrocities. He was the main Royalist critic of Ottley's policies.

Prince Rupert who was appointed Captain-General of Forces in the region on 6 January 1644, had been briefed in unfavourable terms about the situation in Shropshire by Sir John Mennes, who had grievances about unpaid wages and expenses. Rupert wrote on 25 January 1644 to demand that Ottley initiate a reign of terror and announcing that he would soon arrive to make Shrewsbury his base for the Spring campaign. Ottley immediately replied that he had hanged a corporal for dereliction of duty and assured the prince that everything would be ready for his arrival. However, Mennes continued to brief against Ottley and his circle. Even before Rupert's arrival, the pace of fighting in the region rose rapidly, driven by an influx of battle-hardened royalist soldiers redeployed during a lull in the Irish Confederate Wars. Despite initial successes, Mytton continued to carry out damaging actions against the royalists, ambushing and looting a royalist ammunition train from Shrewsbury at Ellesmere, Shropshire and capturing its commanders, and later taking Eyton prisoner at Buildwas. On 14 February the king issued writs under the Privy Seal of England for a loan of £100,000. Ottley's contribution was assessed at only £30, probably in recognition of his past sacrifices in the royalist cause.

Rupert arrived at Shrewsbury on 18 February, armed with the powers of President of Wales, a post substituting for the Council in the Marches of Wales. The major problem facing royalists in the region was lack of money. Rupert immediately abolished “free quarter”, the billeting of soldiers in civilian homes, and announced a transition to a combination of central provisioning and money wages. Next he made an agreement to settle back pay and future wages for the officers and officials, with Ottley himself to receive £20 a week. However, this was probably unrealistic, as the locality had been fairly thoroughly ransacked for resources and funds already. Moreover, horses continued to be billeted in private stables, as Francis Newport complained to Ottley in March.

Meanwhile, Rupert led a brutal campaign to clear the area of Parliamentarian troops, massacring the garrison of Hopton Castle – a move which seems to have stiffened resistance. In March, he left to relieve Newark, with the military situation in Shropshire unchanged despite the disruption and bloodshed. During this month Ottley visited Oxford, probably to rally support at royalist headquarters, where he still had some credit with the king and his closest advisers. On his return, the mayor and aldermen welcomed him back with a gift of sack, cakes and sugar. Ottley continued in office for some time beyond this, although Rupert was clearly unimpressed by him and hoping for his dismissal or resignation. This may be why in May, when he was back in Shropshire, he pressed the Shrewsbury authorities to settle claims for back pay from Ottley and the other officers, as nothing had been paid since the agreement of 19 February and there was still pay outstanding from before that date: a total on 10 May of £1053 1s. It was probably in July that Rupert finally contrived his removal and put in charge Sir Fulke Hunckes, a veteran of the Irish wars, as Hunckes was generally written of as governor by early August.

Ottley remained a Royalist soldier in Shrewsbury, despite his loss of the governorship. Later in the year, Rupert returned to campaign in Shropshire and replaced Hunckes with Sir Michael Erneley, a Wiltshire landowner who had no connection with the area and considered the locals hostile. Ottley was made one of the Commissioners of Shropshire, attending Prince Rupert. At a meeting on 1 November they resolved to meet Ottley's arrears of pay by earmarking the proceeds of the Shropshire estates of John Egerton, 2nd Earl of Bridgewater, who had been declared a recusant. By 23 December, when he was sent a letter about unpaid loans by the king and the Oxford Parliament, he was also royalist High Sheriff of Shropshire, although Parliament recognised Colonel Thomas Mytton, the governor of Wem, as sheriff.

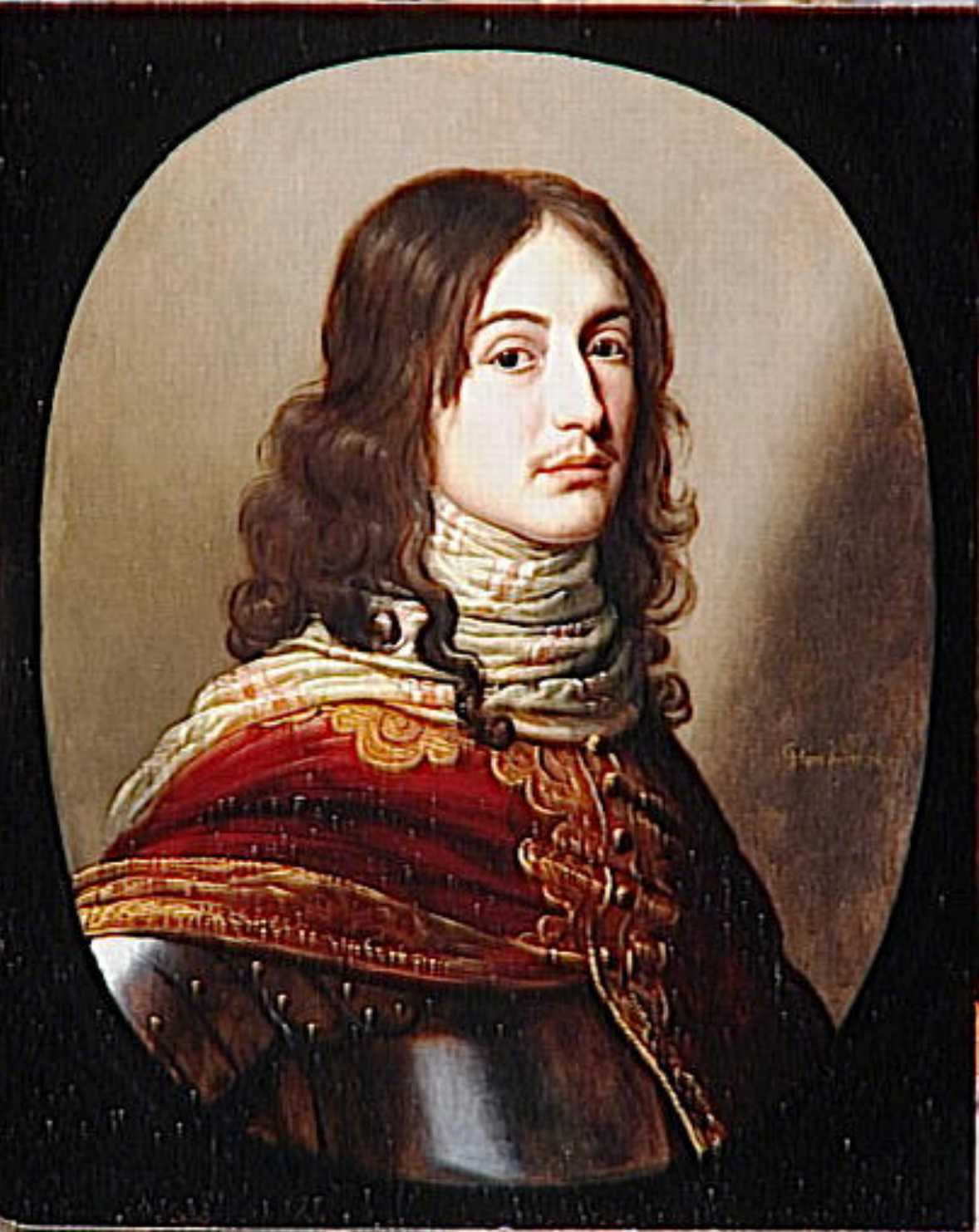
Prince Maurice

Prince Maurice was now put in charge of the Royalist forces in the region in place of his brother. Although less capable, he was no less demanding. Sir Robert Howard of Clun Castle wrote to Ottley suggesting that the county gentry subscribe £100 a month to entertain Maurice to win his favour. Ottley was hoping that a fairer system of levies might be devised to meet the costs of the war, in line with the decisions of the Oxford Parliament. However, such concerns were soon sidelined by the urgent need to prepare for more fighting. Maurice soon wrote to the commissioners to complain about failure to meet the costs of fortifications at Bridgnorth. At Shrewsbury, Erneley was attempting to strengthen the fortifications of the town, expecting an imminent attack and was himself under pressure from Maurice to complete the work. On 25 January 1645 Erneley lambasted Ottley and the local gentry for their failure to make sufficient contributions to the war effort, claiming that they were responsible for fomenting mutiny:

I hope you and the Gentlemen of the County will send mee not lesse then a thousand. If they shall prove backward in a business of soe great consequence to the service of his Majesty, I am confident you must conclude with mee that they want affection to his Majesty's service, and that other their undertakings are noe more than mere pretences. I shall desire your answeare by the Bearer.

This seems to have been sufficiently cutting. On 1 February Ottley wrote to the commissioners of Munslow Hundred in southern Shropshire, not for more money, but calling on them to provide a force of 300 infantry for him to command. He also commissioned a cornet for a company of cavalry, clearly intending to lead a mixed force into battle.

== Capture and after ==
On 4 February Maurice arrived in Shrewsbury and himself weakened its defences by taking away some of its garrison to reinforce his army campaigning in Wales and Cheshire. This gave the county's Parliamentary committee an opportunity to move troops forward, enveloping the town in readiness for an assault. These were organised on 14 February and on 21 February they were pledged £2000 for the operation, with the proviso that looting in Shrewsbury would result in execution under martial law. Later that day they surprised a meeting of royalist commissioners of array at Apley Hall, home of Sir Thomas Whitmore, 1st Baronet, and took them prisoner. These included Ottley himself and the son of Sir William Owen, a former MP and tenant of the Council House in Shrewsbury. The following evening, a small Parliamentarian force led by a Dutch professional soldier, William Reinking, entered the town by a door left open below the Council House. The town's main gates were taken and opened to admit the main force under Mytton and Shrewsbury fell, with little bloodshed, to the Parliamentarians.

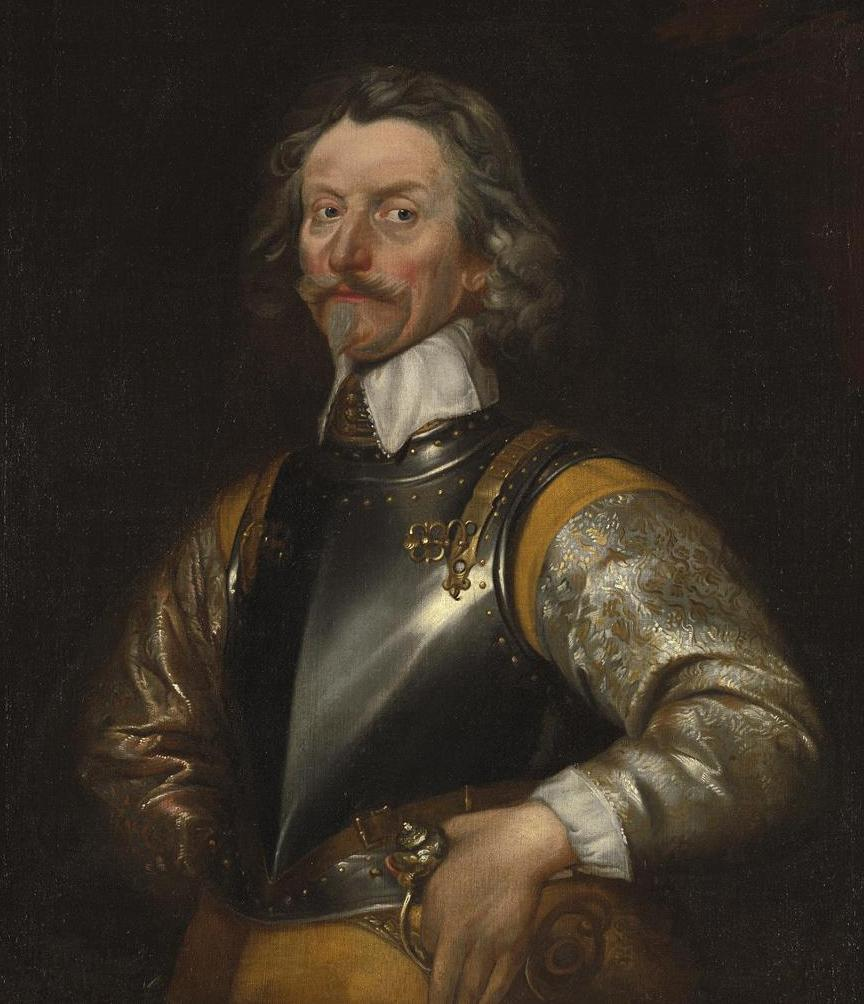
Lord Astley, commander of remaining royalist troops in Shropshire and Cheshire, 1645–6

Ottley was released within months. On 24 July Prince Maurice sent out a letter from Worcester to the remaining governors and garrisons of Shropshire making clear that Ottley had a special direction from the king to raise the posse of the county – a last resort to rally forces as royalist resistance crumbled across the country. They were ordered to provide accommodation for both Ottley and his retinue. As part of this last stand, royalist political authority in Shropshire was vested in Commissioners of Association, with specific reference to achieving an advantageous peace. Ottley was appointed a commissioner, along with Wolryche, Sir Edward Acton, Sir Thomas Edwardes and others. Military leadership fell to Jacob Astley, 1st Baron Astley of Reading. Evidently Ottley wrote to him with concerns about growing dissensions and poor morale among the remaining garrisons. On 10 January 1646 Astley sent two replies on the subject, singling out Bridgnorth as of particular concern. The collapse of morale was spreading into the leadership: Richard Cresset, one of the Commissioners of Array, wrote to Ottley for help in suppressing discussion of his decision no longer to attend meetings, which he asserted would lead to his ruin. Military collapse followed. Astley's scratch force, trying to break out to Oxford, was defeated at the Battle of Stow-on-the-Wold on 21 March. On 26 April Bridgnorth was compelled to surrender. Ottley was one of those who negotiated the surrender of the last important Royalist stronghold in Shropshire to Parliament, on relatively favourable terms, which were extended to cover himself. His wife and children were given separate permission to live at Pitchford.

== Sequestration ==
Under the terms of the surrender, Ottley and his family, like the garrison, were to choose between peace and exile. He chose to stay and on 28 April received the promised pass, allowing him to march unimpeded back to Pitchford, with his family, his arms and his retinue. As his estates had been sequestrated, he was forced to compound for delinquency. Meanwhile, Lady Ottley took steps to secure as much of her household property and land as possible. In the immediate aftermath of the surrender, Elinor Davenport, a relative, went to Bridgnorth to establish good relations with the sequestrators dealing with furnishings and clothing. During May, Thomas Lee, a relative of Sir Francis and a Lincoln's Inn lawyer, probably a parliamentarian, acted for Lady Ottley in negotiating values. Lady Ottley and the children were provided for fairly quickly, with a fifth of Sir Francis's estates handed over to them for their maintenance by an order of 5 September 1646.

The eldest son, Richard, was given a pass to go the Bridgnorth on 16 June and this may have been in connection with Ottley's request to compound for delinquency, which was made formally on that date. Two days later Sir Francis begged the County Committee to hand over his father's will and all other documentation in their possession and to cease meddling with his estate. It seems that there was friction between the sequestrators and the County Committee, as the latter was removing timber as compensation for Ottley's burning of houses during the war. The sequestrators made an order to prevent removal of timber in June and reiterated it, while trying to speed up appraisal of the value, during the following month. However, the process proved extremely protracted and complex, taking more than 3 years. On 7 September 1646 Ottley's fine was fixed at £2,130. In response Ottley asked for allowance to be made for timber and other items taken away by the County Committee in contravention of the sequestrators' previous orders. In May 1647 he introduced a request for further losses to be taken into account. On 6 March 1648 the Shropshire Committee for Sequestrations issued an order releasing Ottley's estates, as he had accepted in principle the fine imposed on him. The signatories included Humphrey Mackworth. However, there were still numerous details to settle. During the summer Ottley was accused in a pamphlet of involvement in a royalist plot to resume resistance in Shropshire by seizing a house known as Dawley Castle and the nearby house of Sir Basil Brooke, presumably Madeley Court. Little came of the plot or the accusation. However, delays mounted and on 20 December 1648 he was granted a pass by Thomas Fairfax, the Lord General of Parliament's forces, to return to Shropshire to expedite his final composition. Ottley's younger son, Adam, accompanied him on the trip, staying at Dudmaston Hall, Wolryche's estate near Bridgnorth. By late February 1649 Adam was corresponding with his father about a lawsuit in which the Ottley's were allied with Sir William Aston against Mackworth, although the details of this are unknown. On 13 April 1649 Sir Francis asked for his son Richard to be included in his composition. The following day a reduced fine of £1860 was announced. Further negotiations over his £4,000 of debts resulted in a further reduction of £660, with the final result that, on 25 June 1649, he was ordered to pay a fine of £1200.

== Death ==
Ottley died in London on 11 September 1649.

== Marriage and Family ==
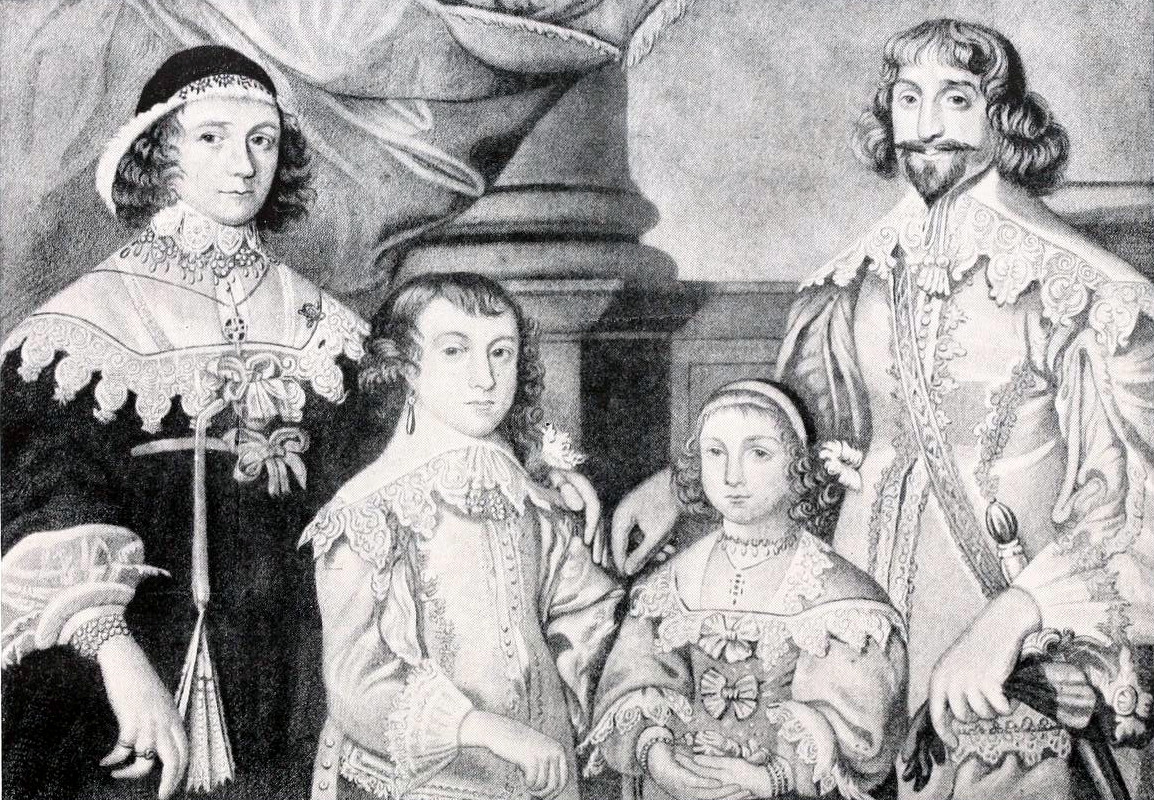
Sir Francis Ottley with his wife, Lucy Edwards, and two of their children, Richard and Mary. An engraving made c.1825 after an oil painting of 1636 by Petrus Troueil, now owned by the Shrewsbury Museums Service.

Francis Ottley married Lucy Edwards, daughter of Thomas Edwards of the College, Shrewsbury, in 1624. She was the widow of Thomas Pope, another Shrewsbury resident, and was about eight years older than Ottley. Francis and Lucy Ottley had at least three children, whose baptisms are recorded in the Pitchford parish register.

- Sir Richard Ottley (baptised 15 September 1626) was an important Shropshire politician and MP after the Restoration.
- Adam Ottley (baptised 26 October 1628) was also involved in post-restoration politics in Shropshire, a town clerk of Shrewsbury.
- Mary Ottley (baptised 30 March 1630) lived through the Civil War but died in August 1648.

Lady Lucy Ottley long outlived her husband and at least two of her children. Both Richard and Adam kept her informed of political developments in London and in their own region, while she regularly sent pies from Shropshire. She was buried on 19 May 1680 at Pitchford.

=== Family tree ===
Family tree: the Ottleys of Pitchford

The following family tree is based on information extracted from the heraldic visitations of Shropshire, Lord Hawkesbury's pedigree and the Pitchford parish register.

Philip Ottley of Ottley in the Lordship of Ellesmere, Shropshire | Anne Lacon of Willey
Anne, Daughter of Robert Scriven of Frodesley | Thomas Ottley (died 1485), 3rd son, Merchant of the Staple of Calais, Bailiff of Shrewsbury 1439-43, 1st Alderman 1444, purchased Pitchford 1473 | Margaret (died 1486), daughter of Sir Humphrey Blount of Kinlet
William Ottley (died 1529) of Pitchford Hall, High Sheriff of Shropshire 1500 and 1513 | Margery, daughter and heiress of John Bruyn of the Hay, near Bridgnorth | John Ottley | Richard Ottley, Rector of Pitchford 1509-20
Thomas Ottley (died 1534) of Pitchford | Katherine, daughter of Sir Robert Corbet of Moreton Corbet Castle | 7 further sons | 12 daughters
William Ottley (died 1543) of Pitchford | Margaret, daughter of Edward Leighton
Adam Ottley (died 1578) of Pitchford | Marie (died 1592), daughter of Richard Mainwaring of Ightfield
Catherine (died 1586) daughter of John Mackworth of Betton Strange | Richard Ottley (died 1606) of Pitchford | Katherine Lake (died 1603)
Mary (1576-1642), daughter of Roger Gifford MD, MP for Old Sarum | Thomas Ottley of Pitchford (died 1622) | Francis Ottley | Richard Mackworth of Betton Strange | Dorothy Cranage, later Gorton | Adam Ottley of London
Sir Francis Ottley of Pitchford (c.1600-1649), Royalist governor of Shrewsbury 1643-4, Royalist High Sheriff of Shropshire 1645-6 | Lucy (c.1593-1680), daughter of Thomas Edwards of the College, Shrewsbury | Richard Ottley (born 1602), Royalist infantry captain | Ursula Ottley (born 1607) | Sir Thomas Wolryche, 1st Baronet (1598-1668) of Dudmaston Hall, MP for Wenlock, Royalist military governor of Bridgnorth 1643-4 | Humphrey Mackworth (died 1654) of Betton Strange, colonel in Parliamentary army, governor of Shrewsbury 1645-54, member of Council of State, MP for Shropshire in First Protectorate Parliament | Adam Ottley
Sir Richard Ottley of Pitchford (1626-70), Gentleman of the Privy Chamber to Charles II, Deputy Lieutenant of Shropshire, MP for Shropshire | Lettice (died 1668), daughter of Robert Ridgeway, 2nd Earl of Londonderry | Adam Ottley (1628-93), Town Clerk of Shrewsbury 1662-81 | Mary (1629-48) | Sir Francis Wolryche, 2nd Baronet (1627-88), declared insane | John Wolryche (c.1637-85), MP for Much Wenlock, ancestor of remaining Wolryche baronets | Mary Griffith, daughter of Matthew Griffith, royal chaplain.
Thomas Ottley of Pitchford (1750-95) | Elizabeth (died 1725), daughter of Sir Samuel Baldwyn (c.1618-83) of Elsedge, Serjeant-at-Law, MP for Ludlow | Adam Ottley (1654/5-1723), Bishop of St David's | Anne Baldwyn (died 1720), probably daughter of Sir Samuel Baldwyn and sister of Elizabeth | Wolryche Baronets
Adam Ottley (1685-1752) of Pitchford, High Sheriff of Shropshire 1738 | Bridget (died 1737), daughter of Sir William Gresley, 3rd Baronet, of Drakelow, Derbyshire | Mary Ottley (1678-44) | Revd. John Davies (died 1742), Rector of Pitchford (1741-2)
Thomas Ottley (1716-1807) of Pitchford, together with his son adopted as heir Charles Cecil Cope Jenkinson, later 3rd Earl of Liverpool | Catherine (died 1792), daughter of Sir Robert Bankes Jenkinson, 4th Baronet of Walcot, Oxfordshire, and Hawkesbury, Gloucestershire, and cousin of Charles Jenkinson, 1st Earl of Liverpool | Adam Ottley 1719-98) | Bridget Ottley (1721-43)
Adam Ottley (1745-1807), died sine prole
