= Edward Lawley =

English politician

Sir Edward Lawley (baptized 9 January 1586 – 23 May 1623) was an English politician who sat in the House of Commons between 1614 and 1622.

== Biography ==
Lawley was the son of Sir Thomas Lawley of Wenlock and his wife Elizabeth Newport, daughter of Sir Richard Newport (died 1570) of High Ercall, Shropshire, who was the widow of Francis Lawley of Spoonhill. He was educated at Brasenose College, Oxford in 1604, then admitted to the Inner Temple in November 1605 and became prothonotary and clerk of the crown for Pembrokeshire. In 1614, Lawley was elected Member of Parliament for Wenlock. He was knighted at Whitehall on 9 November 1619. In 1621 he was re-elected MP for Wenlock.

== Family ==
Lawley married Susan Fisher, daughter of Sir Thomas Fisher, 1st Baronet of Islington. He had one daughter Ursula who married Roger Bertie (died 1654), second son of Robert Bertie, 1st Earl of Lindsey. Lawley died in May 1623, the year after he succeeded to his father's estates, aged 37. His widow died at the end of the same year.

== Notes ==
Parliament of England
Preceded by Robert Lawley; George Lawley	Member of Parliament for Wenlock; 1614; With: Rowland Lacon 1614; Thomas Wolryche 1621–1622	Succeeded by Thomas Wolryche; Henry Mytton
