= Wolryche baronets =

Extinct baronetcy in the Baronetage of England

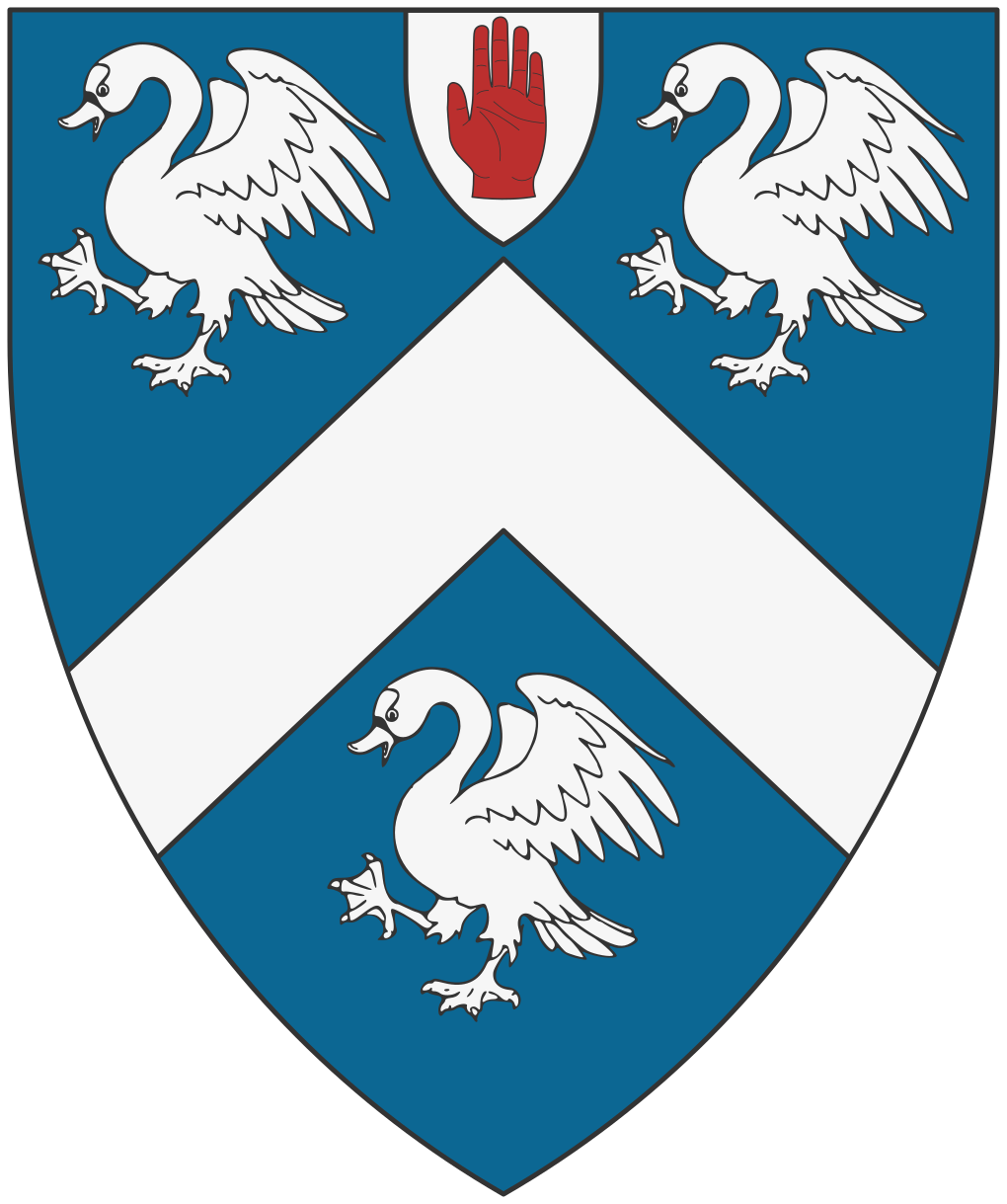
Arms of Wolryche of Dudmaston

The Wolryche Baronetcy (/ˈwʊlrɪtʃ/ WUUL-ritch), of Dudmaston in the County of Shropshire, was a title in the Baronetage of England. It was created on 4 August 1641 for Thomas Wolryche, previously Member of Parliament for Wenlock. The title became extinct on the death of the fourth Baronet in 1723.

== Wolryche baronets, of Dudmaston (1641) ==
- Sir Thomas Wolryche, 1st Baronet (1598–1668)
- Sir Francis Wolryche, 2nd Baronet (c. 1627–1688)
- Sir Thomas Wolryche, 3rd Baronet (1672–1701)
- Sir John Wolryche, 4th Baronet (c. 1691–1723)
The Wolryches

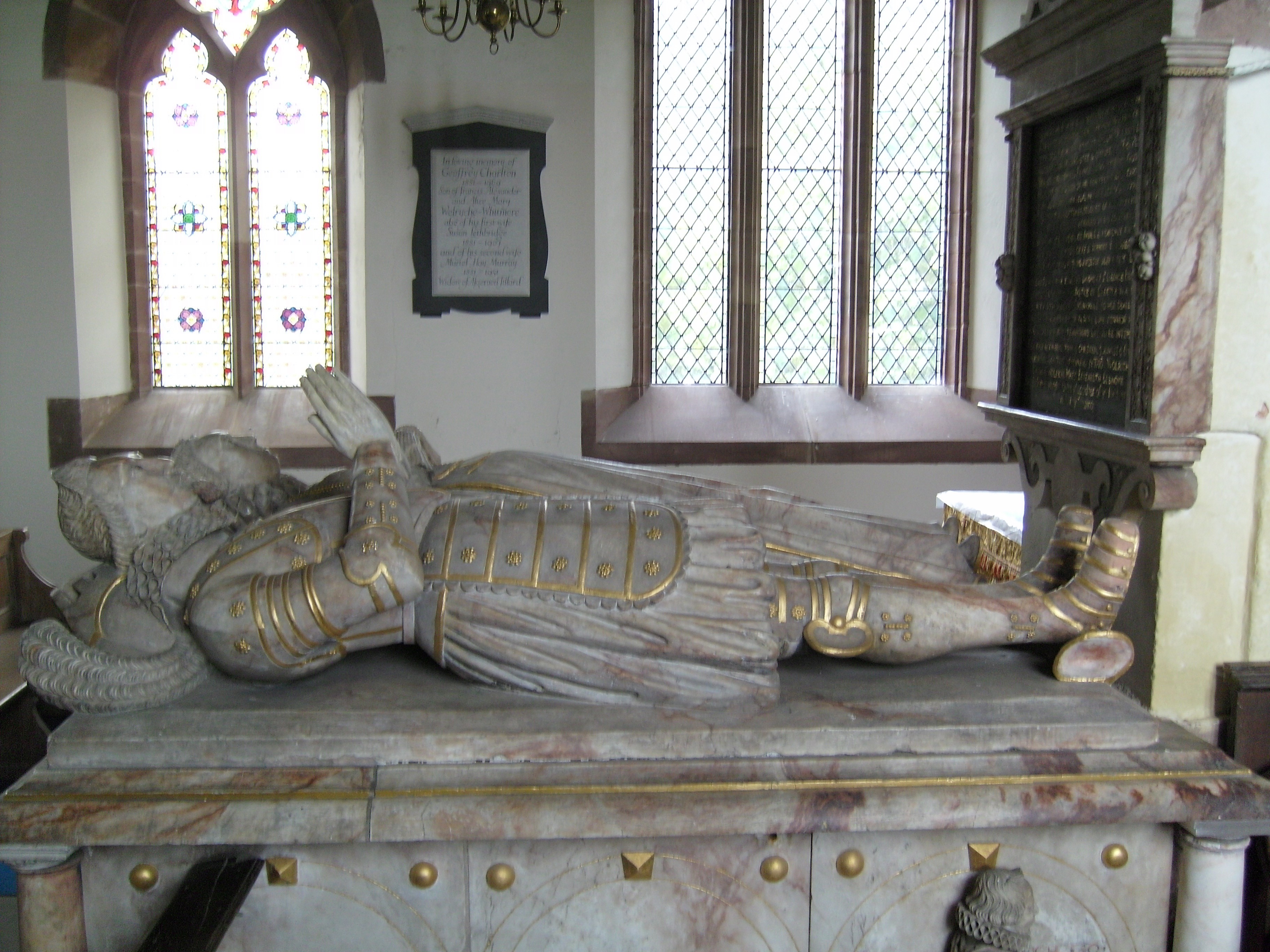
Tomb of Francis and Margaret Wolryche in St. Andrew's church, Quatt. They were the ancestors of all the Wolryche Baronets.

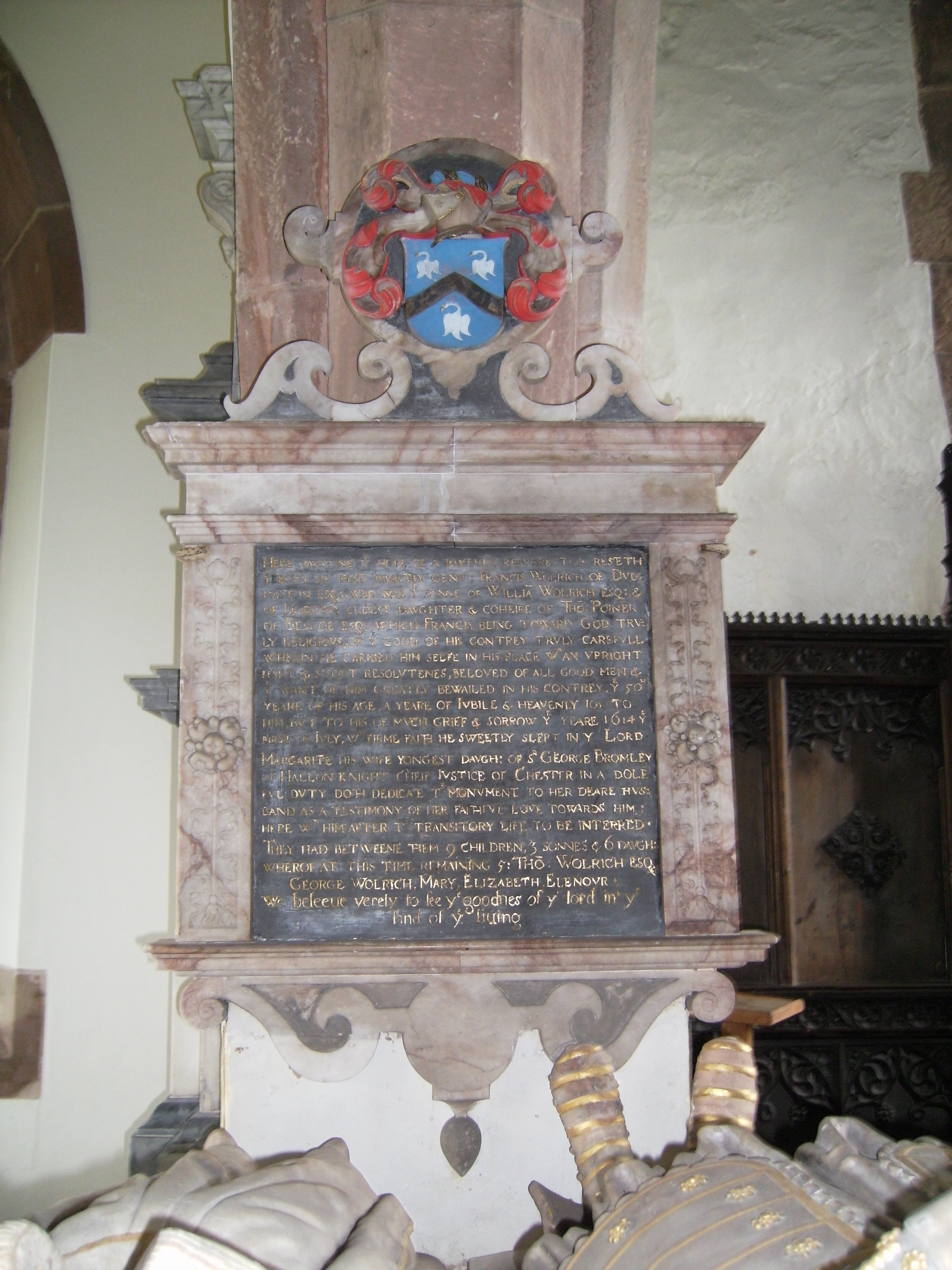
Margaret's memorial to Francis, installed after his death in 1614.

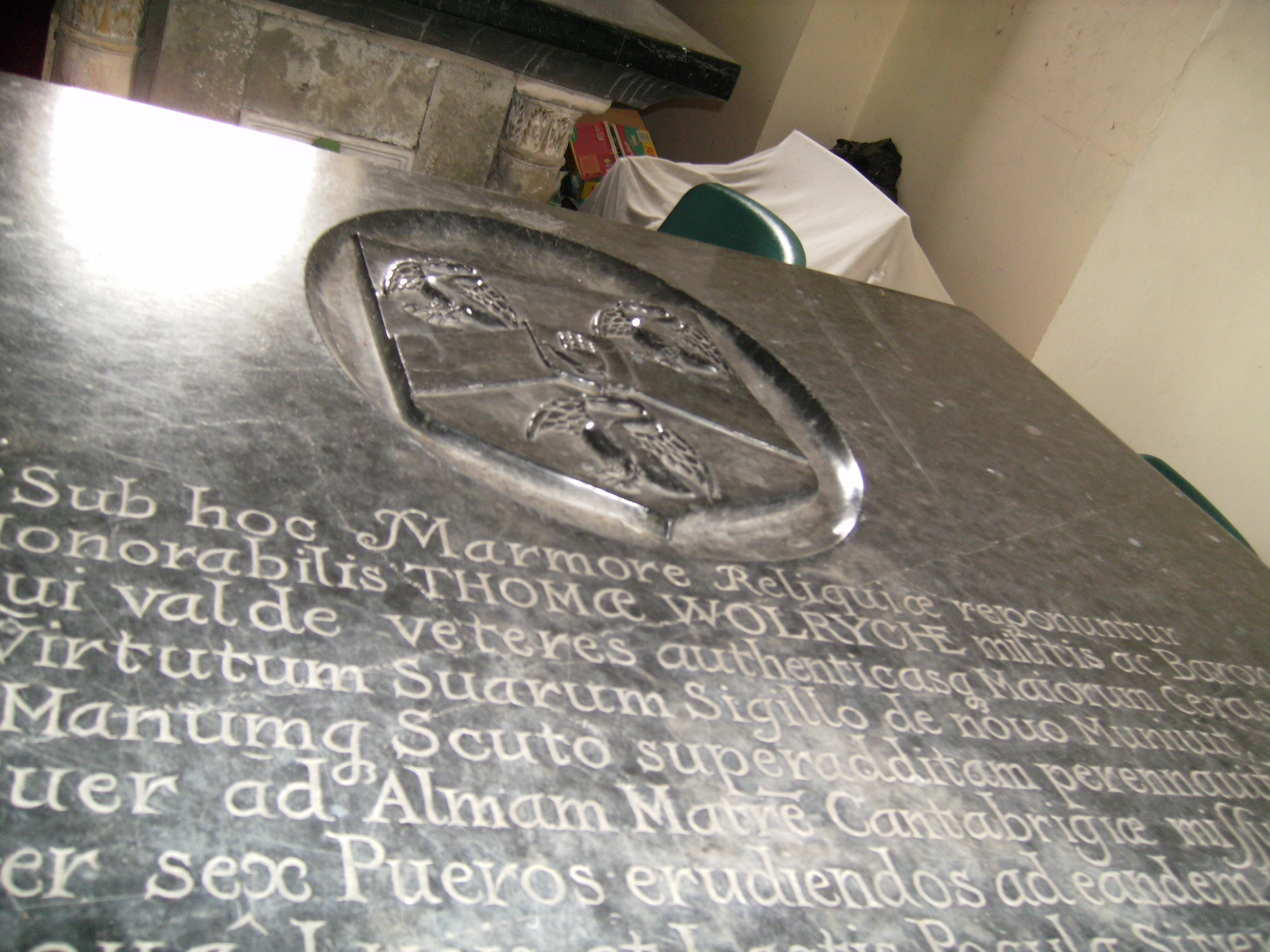
Inscription on Sir Thomas Wolryche's tomb, lauding his military achievements. He was a prominent Cavalier commander regionally.

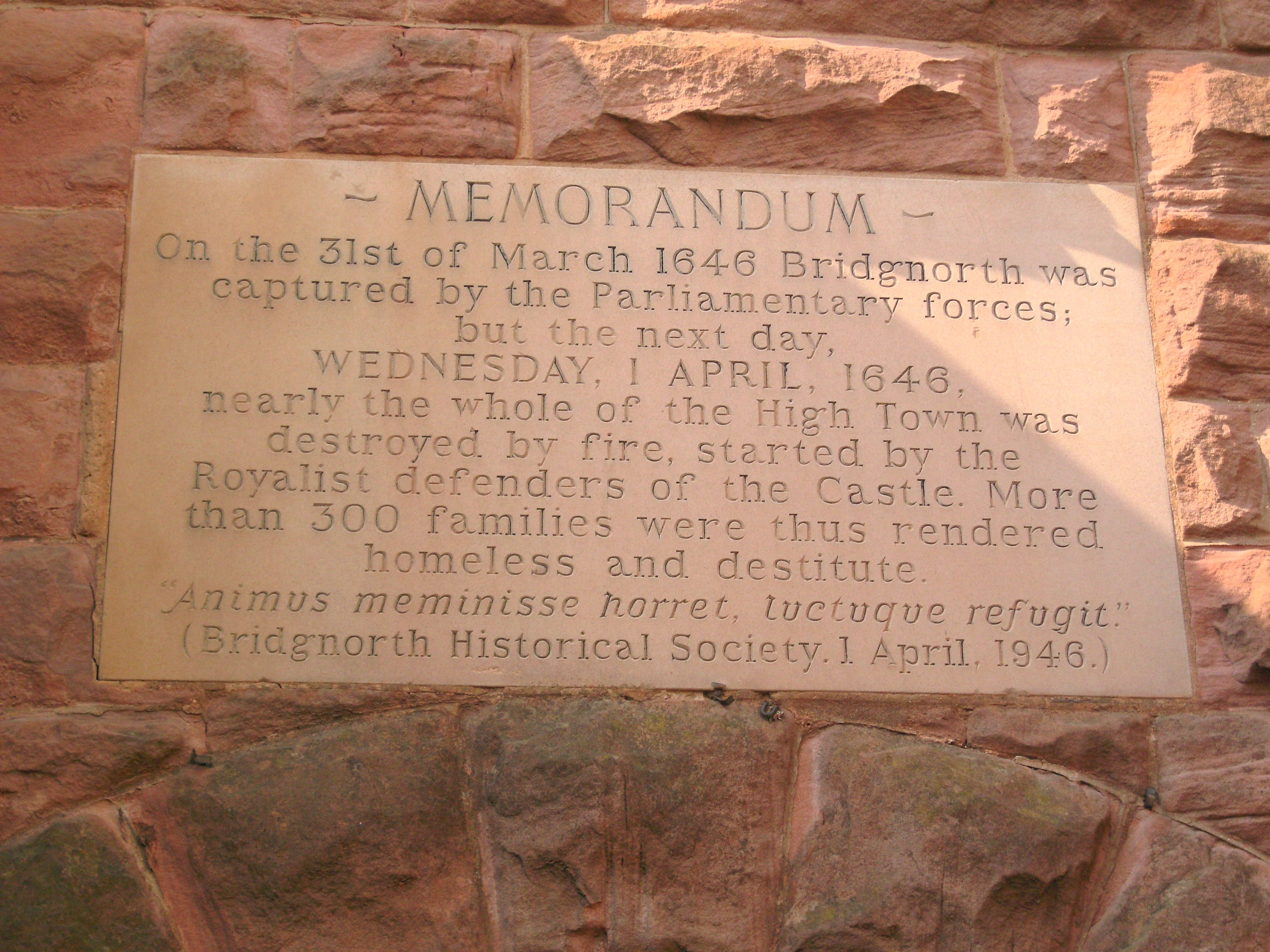
Inscription on Bridgnorth Museum, commemorating Sir Thomas Wolryche's deliberate destruction of the town in his defence of the castle against Parliamentary forces in 1646.

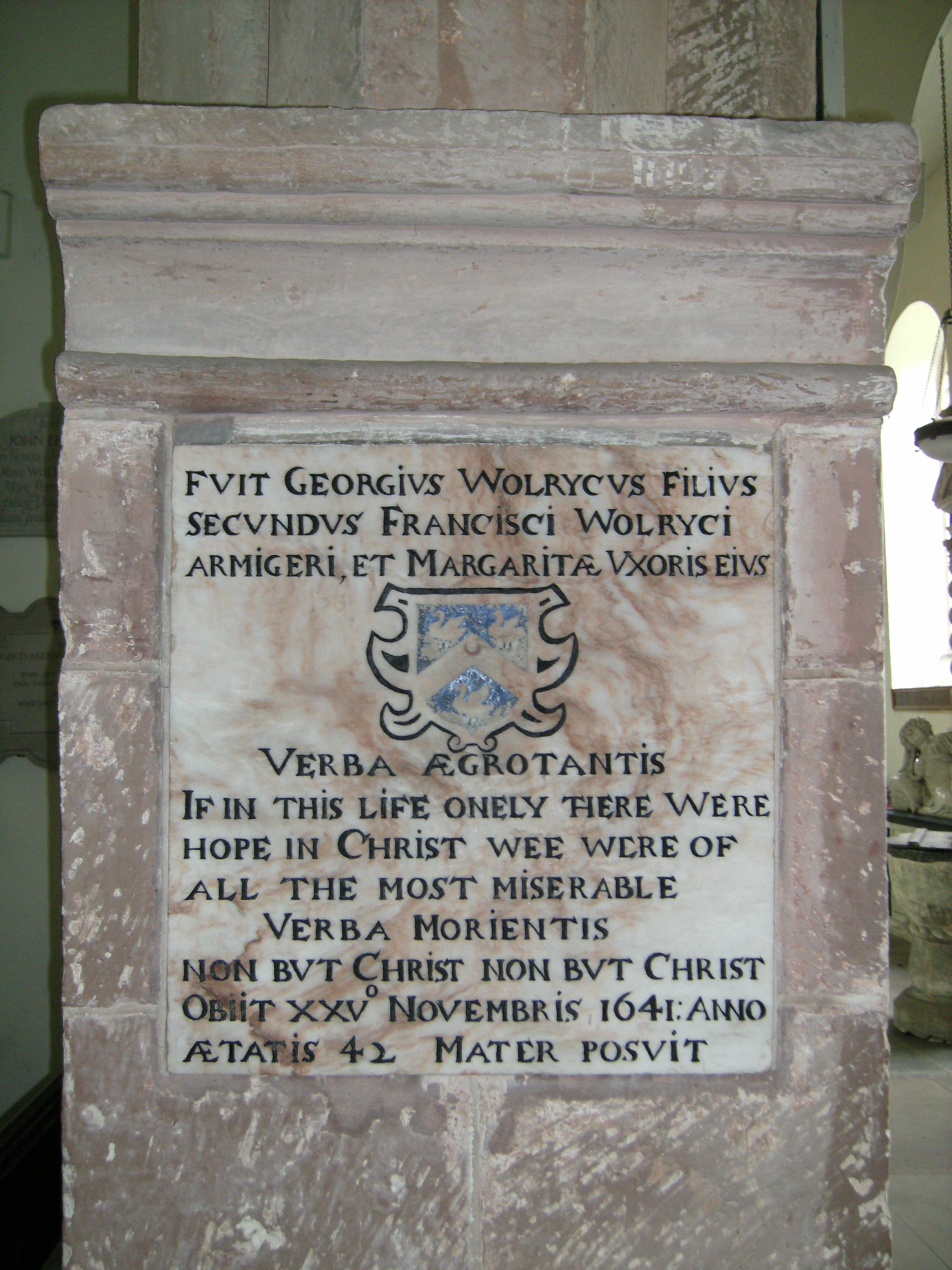
Memorial to George Wolryche, a younger brother of Sir Thomas, the first baronet.

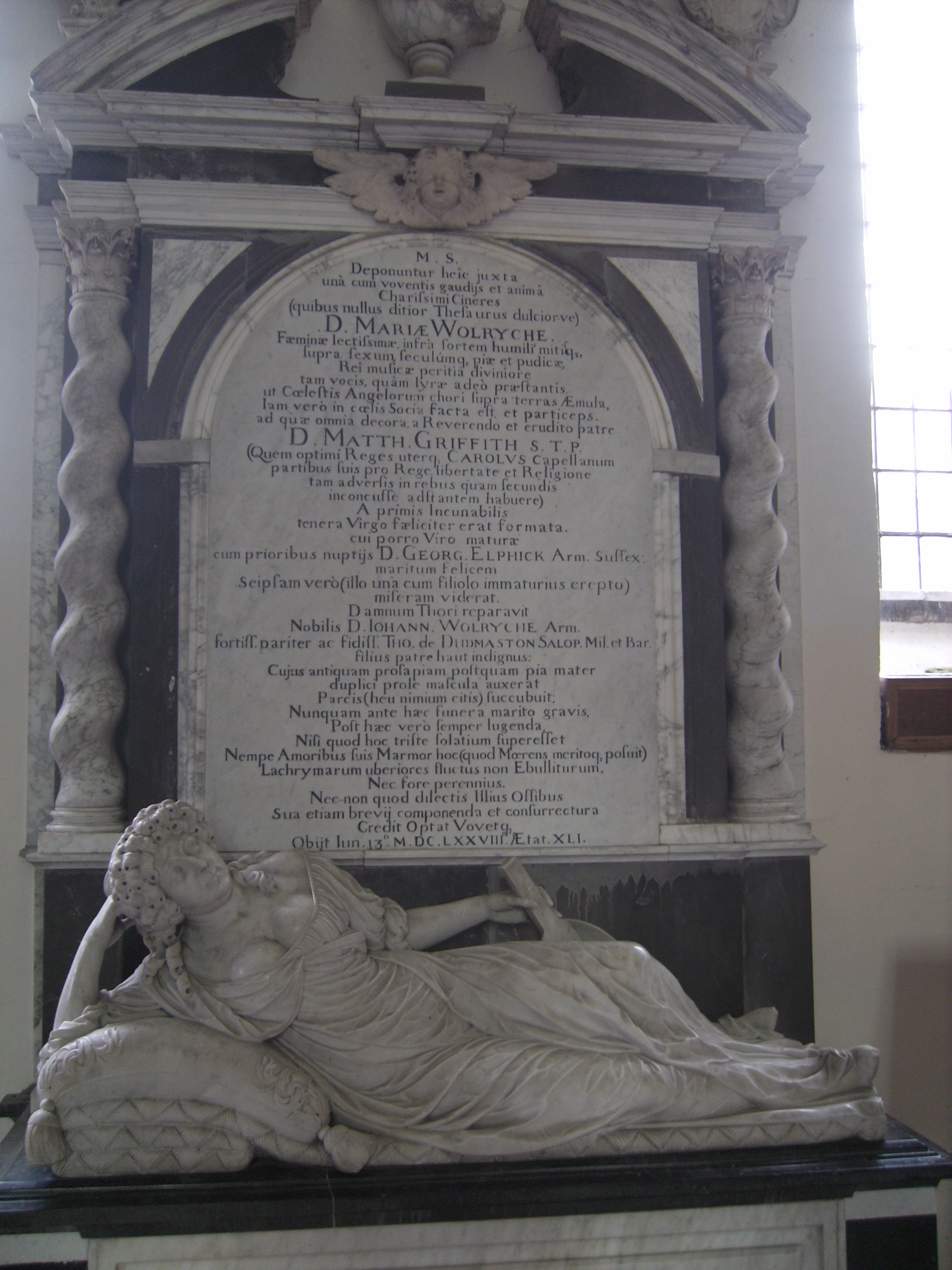
Tomb of Mary Wolryche, who died in 1678: wife of John Wolryche, a younger son of the first baronet. She was daughter of Matthew Griffith, a prominent churchman.
