= Sack (wine) =

Historical term for white fortified wine from Spain or the Canary Islands

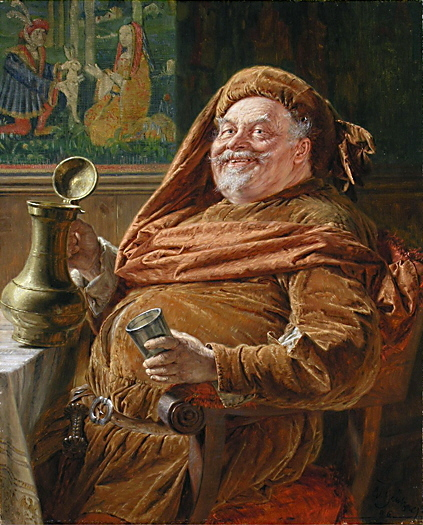
Falstaff: "If I had a thousand sons, the first humane principle I would teach them should be, to forswear thin potations and to addict themselves to sack."

Sack is an antiquated wine term referring to white fortified wine imported from mainland Spain or the Canary Islands. There was sack of different origins such as:

- Canary sack from the Canary Islands,
- Malaga sack from Málaga,
- Palm sack from Palma de Mallorca, and
- Sherris sack from Jerez de la Frontera.

The term Sherris sack later gave way to sherry as the English term for fortified wine from Jerez. Since sherry is practically the only one of these wines still widely exported and consumed, "sack" (by itself, without qualifier) is commonly but not quite correctly quoted as an old synonym for sherry.

Most sack was probably sweet, and matured in wooden barrels for a limited time. In modern terms, a typical sack may have resembled cheaper versions of medium Oloroso sherry.

Today, sack is sometimes seen included in the name of some sherries, such as the Williams & Humbert brand "Dry Sack".

== Etymology ==
The Collins English Dictionary, the Chambers Dictionary, and the Oxford English Dictionary all derive the word "sack" from the French sec, meaning "dry". However, the OED cannot explain the change in the vowel, and it has been suggested by others that the term is actually from the Spanish word sacar, meaning "to withdraw", as in withdrawing wine from a solera, which led to sacas. The word "sack" is not attested before 1530.

Julian Jeffs writes: "The word sack (there are several spellings) probably originated at the end of the fifteenth century, and is almost certainly derived from the Spanish verb sacar ("to withdraw"). In the minutes of the Jerez town council for 1435, exports of wine were referred to as sacas."

=== Historical background ===
The Duke of Medina Sidonia abolished taxes on export of wine from Sanlúcar de Barrameda in 1491, allowing both Spanish and foreign ships. English merchants were given preferential treatment in 1517, and distinction was upheld between second-rate wines, so-called "Bastards", and first-rate wines which were known as "Rumneys" and "Sacks". Málaga, formerly in the Kingdom of Granada, also took to using the name sack for its wines, which were previously sold as "Garnacha".

This wine was similar to another wine known as malmsey, made from Malvasia grapes.

== Literary references ==
Sack appears in several of Shakespeare's plays. John Falstaff, introduced in 1597, was fond of sack, and sometimes refers specifically to Sherris sack. In act 2, scene 2, of The Tempest, Stephano, Trinculo, and Caliban get drunk on sack, a barrel of which had provided Stephano's escape from the shipwreck ("I escaped upon a butt of sack, which the sailors heaved o'erboard ..."). Shakespeare's minor character Christopher Sly, a drunkard and an object of a jest in The Taming of the Shrew, declares that he has "ne'er drunk sack in his life".

Robert Herrick wrote two comic poems in praise of sack, "His Farewell to Sack" and "The Welcome to Sack".

Ben Jonson's Inviting a Friend to Supper refers to "A pure cup of rich Canary wine, / Which is the Mermaid's now, but shall be mine".

The early Poets Laureate of England and the UK, such as Jonson and Dryden, received their salary, in part or in whole, in sack. Later laureates, including Pye and Tennyson, took cash in lieu of sack.

Samuel Pepys thought "Malago Sack ... was excellent wine, like a spirit rather than wine."

In the English fairy tale The Three Heads of the Well, upon leaving the kingdom the antagonist is given "sweetmeats, sugar, almonds, &c., in great quantities, and a large bottle of Malaga sack", in contrast to bread, hard cheese, and a bottle of beer given to the protagonist.
