= Matthew Griffith =

English clergyman

Matthew Griffith (1599? – 1665) was an English clergyman.

== Early life and education ==
Griffith was born in London in or before 1599. He studied at Brasenose College, Oxford, later moving to Gloucester Hall, where he graduated with a Bachelor of Arts in February 1619. He continued his studies at Christ's College, Cambridge, gaining a Master's in 1621.

== Church career ==
In 1624, Griffith became the rector of St Mary Magdalen Old Fish Street in London, possibly through his connection to John Donne. In April 1640, he was also made rector of St Benet Sherehog.

With the onset of the Civil War in 1642, Griffith regularly preached against the Parliamentarians who opposed the King, including in his criticism any who offered material or financial support to them. This led to his arrest on 5 November, and he was imprisoned at Newgate and then at Lord Petre's house, which had been seized by anti-Royalist forces. Griffith's property was also seized in early 1643, under an order issued by the House of Commons of England.

Later that year, Griffith escaped to Oxford, and was made a Doctor of Divinity by order of the king. He was also appointed as a royal chaplain.

He helped to defend Basing House, 1645; his royalist sermon (1660) answered by Milton, 1660; master of the Temple and rector of Bladon, Oxfordshire, c. 1661–5.
