= Listed buildings in Worfield =

Worfield is a civil parish in Shropshire, England. It contains 77 listed buildings that are recorded in the National Heritage List for England. Of these, one is listed at Grade I, the highest of the three grades, four are at Grade II*, the middle grade, and the others are at Grade II, the lowest grade. The parish includes the village of Worfield, and other villages and smaller settlements, including Allscot, Ackleton, Chesterton, Hilton, Roughton, Stableford, Swancote, and Wyken, and is otherwise rural. Most of the listed buildings are houses, cottages, farmhouses and farm buildings, the earlier of which are timber framed, or have timber framed cores. The other listed buildings include a church, the churchyard wall and gate piers, a country house and associated dovecote, two bridges, a watermill, public houses, a school, a war memorial, and two telephone kiosks.

== Key ==
Grade	Criteria
I	Buildings of exceptional interest, sometimes considered to be internationally important
II*	Particularly important buildings of more than special interest
II	Buildings of national importance and special interest

== Buildings ==
Name and location	Photograph	Date	Notes	Grade
St Peter's Church; 52.55960°N 2.35820°W		14th century	The church was extensively restored in 1861–62. It is built in red sandstone, and consists of a nave, north and south aisles, a south porch, a chancel, and a tower at the west end of the south aisle. The church is mainly in Decorated style. The tower has angle buttresses, clock faces on the north and south sides, an embattled parapet, and a recessed spire in grey stone.	II*
Pair of cottages, Chesterton Farm; 52.57351°N 2.31654°W	—	15th century	The cottages incorporate the remains of a chapel. They are in stone with a tile roof, and have two storeys. On the south front is a doorway with a pointed arch, and there are remains of old windows on the south and west fronts.	II
Bromley Farm House; 52.55573°N 2.39423°W		16th century	The farmhouse, which was altered later, is timber framed with painted brick infill on a stone plinth, with a tile roof, two storeys and an attic. The windows are casements, there are gabled dormers, and a doorway with a hood on brackets. To the right of the doorway is a projecting gabled bay with cedar shingle-hanging.	II
Marindin House; 52.57257°N 2.31772°W		16th century	The house was altered in the 18th century. The earlier part is timber framed, the later part is in brick, and the roof is tiled. There are two storeys and an attic, and an L-shaped plan with a front of three bays. On the front is a plain parapet, a porch with a Doric pilasters, and a doorway with a fanlight. The windows are a mix of sashes and casements.	II
Rowley Farmhouse; 52.56137°N 2.34445°W	—	16th century	The farmhouse is timber framed and it has been rendered. The roof is tiled, and there are two storeys and an attic. The plan consists of a hall range and a cross-wing, with later alterations.	II
The Club House; 52.55910°N 2.35801°W	—	16th century	Originally a school, the building is timber framed with brick infill and some stone, on a brick plinth, and with a tile roof. There is one storey, the windows are casements, and there is a corbelled-out window in the right gable end.	II
Rowley Farm Malthouse; 52.56118°N 2.34494°W	—	Late 16th or early 17th century	The malthouse consists of a sandstone block with two storeys an attic and a cellar, and flanking timber framed gabled wings with brick infill. The roof is partly tiled and part is in corrugated sheet, and the windows are mullioned.	II
Sonde Farmhouse; 52.56044°N 2.35523°W	—	Early 17th century	The farmhouse possibly incorporates earlier material and it was altered in the 19th century. It is timber framed with painted brick infill, and has a tile roof. There is an L-shaped plan, consisting of a range with two storeys and an attic, a rear wing with one storey and an attic, and a single-storey range of outbuildings. In the angle is a lean-to porch, and the windows are casements.	II
No 1 (opposite Rindleford Mill); 52.55735°N 2.38701°W	—	17th century	A cottage that was later extended. The early part is timber framed on a stone plinth, with one storey and an attic and casement windows. The later part is in brick with two storeys and sash windows.	II
1–3 Bromley; 52.55537°N 2.39415°W	—	17th century (probable	A row of timber framed cottages with a tile roof. There is one storey and attics, the windows are casements, and there are three gabled dormers.	II
5 and 6 Bromley; 52.55563°N 2.39372°W	—	17th century	A house, later divided into two, it is in stone and brick, and has a tile roof. There are two storeys and an attic, and three bays. The windows are casements with hood moulds, and the doorway has a round head.	II
6 and 7 Main Street; 52.55851°N 2.35771°W	—	17th century	A pair of timber framed cottages with painted brick infill and tile roofs. They each have two storeys and two bays, and No. 7 is taller and wider. The doorways have plain surrounds, and the windows are casements.	II
2 Worfield; 52.55847°N 2.35737°W	—	17th century	A timber framed house on a corner site, with painted brick infill and a tile roof. There is one storey and an attic, and an L-shaped plan, with a front of two bays, the right bay gabled. The porch has a gabled hood, and the windows are casements.	II
6 Wyken Cottages; 52.55187°N 2.35214°W	—	17th century	The cottage is timber framed and has a tile roof. There is one storey and an attic, and two bays. The windows are casements, and there are two gabled dormers.	II
Allscott Cottages; 52.56279°N 2.38827°W		17th century	A farmhouse divided into two dwellings, it is in red brick with stone dressings and a tile roof. There is a T-shaped plan, consisting of a main block with two storeys and an attic, and a gabled wing at the left with one storey and an attic. The main block has three bays, the middle bay projecting and gabled, and in front is a two-bay extension under a catslide roof. The attic window is mullioned and the other windows are mullioned and transomed.	II
Bromley House Cottage; 52.55500°N 2.39359°W	—	17th century	The cottage is in stone with a tile roof. There is one storey and an attic, and two bays. On the front is a two-light mullioned window, a casement window, a blocked doorway, and two gabled dormers.	II
Cranmere Farm House; 52.57479°N 2.36196°W	—	17th century	The farmhouse, which was altered later, is in stone with a tile roof. There are two storeys and three bays, the outer bays forming slightly projecting wings. The windows are a mix of sashes and casements.	II
Davenport Lodge; 52.55682°N 2.35802°W		17th century	A timber framed house with painted brick infill and a tile roof. There is one storey and an attic, two bays, and a single-storey wing on the left. On the right side is a projecting chimney breast, the porch has a tile hood on brackets, the windows are casements, and there are two gabled dormers.	II
Ewdness Manor House; 52.58091°N 2.39791°W		17th century	A farmhouse in red sandstone with a tile roof. There are two storeys and attics, and an H-shaped plan, consisting of a three-bay central range and projecting gabled one-bay wings. The windows in the centre range are mullioned and in the wings they are mullioned and transomed. The doorway has pilasters and a flat cornice hood on brackets. At the side are large projecting chimney stacks.	II*
General Stores (Ye Olde House), Hilton; 52.55455°N 2.33321°W	—	17th century (probable)	A house and shop that has been restored, it is timber framed with limewashed brick infill and a tile roof. The gable end faces the road and contains a shop front, and there are two gabled dormers.	II
Gorsty Hayes; 52.58552°N 2.35573°W		17th century (probable)	A timber framed house with plastered infill and a tile roof. There are storeys and an attic, and on the front is a two-storey gabled open porch. The gable of the house faces the road, and its upper storey and attic are jettied with moulded bressumers. The windows are casements with lattice glazing.	II
Hallan Farm Cottages; 52.56126°N 2.36234°W	—	17th century	A row of cottages that were later extended to the east. They are partly timber framed with brick infill, and partly in brick with applied timbers, and have tile roofs. There are two storeys, the windows are modern casements, and there are three gabled dormers.	II
Hallonsford; 52.56067°N 2.35847°W	—	17th century (probable)	A long timber framed house with painted brick infill and a tile roof. There are two storeys, a lower extension to the north, and a gabled porch on the south.	II
Hayes Bank; 52.58478°N 2.35822°W	—	17th century	The house, which was later altered, is in stone and brick, partly plastered, and has a tile roof with coped gables. There are two storeys and an attic and three bays. On the front is a gabled porch, and the windows, which are mullioned, are a mix of casements and sashes.	II
Malt House Cottage and The Cottage; 52.58564°N 2.35554°W	—	17th century	A house that was extended in the 19th century, and has been divided into two dwellings. The early part is timber framed with infill in wattle and daub and in brick, the later parts are in whitewashed brick, and the roof is tiled. There is a single storey and an attic, five bays, a small rear extension and single-storey extensions on the right. The widows are casements, and there are dormers.	II
Newton; 52.57102°N 2.39547°W	—	17th century (probable)	A timber framed cottage with some weatherboarding, brick infill, and a tile roof. There is one storey and an attic, and the windows are casements.	II
Pool Cottage; 52.56178°N 2.36815°W	—	17th century	The cottage is timber framed with painted brick infill, sprocket eaves, and a tile roof. There is one storey and an attic, two bays, and a single-storey wing on the left. The windows are casements, and there are two gabled dormers.	II
Rindleford Mill House; 52.55723°N 2.38676°W	—	17th century	The house is in stone with a brick front and a tile roof. There are two storeys and an attic, and three bays. The doorway has a plain surround and a bracketed hood, and the windows are a mix of sashes and casements.	II
Roughton Cottage; 52.54548°N 2.35863°W		17th century (probable)	A timber framed cottage on a sandstone plinth with brick infill and a tile roof. There is one storey and an attic, and two bays. The windows are casements, and at the north end is a large external chimney breast.	II
Stableford Farm Cottages; 52.58444°N 2.35739°W	—	17th century (probable)	A row of timber framed cottages with brick infill and a tile roof. There is one storey and attics, and they contain five casement windows, three gabled dormers, and three doorway with plain surrounds.	II
Barn to west of The Laurels; 52.58687°N 2.34020°W		17th century (probable)	Originally a tithe barn, it is timber framed with brick infill on a stone plinth, with a tile roof. The doorway has a segmental head.	II
Ye Olde House. Worfield; 52.55887°N 2.35796°W	—	17th century (probable)	The house is timber framed with painted brick infill, it has a tile roof, and its gable end faces the street. There are two storeys and two bays. The windows are casements, and there are two gabled dormers.	II
Lower Hall; 52.55916°N 2.35740°W		Late 17th century (probable)	A timber framed house with roughcast infill and a tile roof. There are two storeys and an attic, a double-pile plan, five bays, two gables at the front and the rear, and a service range to the left. The upper storeys and attic are continuously jettied with moulded bressumers. Most of the windows are sashes with rusticated surrounds, in the attic are casement windows, and between the gables at the front is a gablet containing an oculus. At the sides are projecting chimney breasts, and there is a square turret at the rear on the left and a polygonal turret on the front at the right.	II*
Chesterton Farm House; 52.57248°N 2.31725°W	—	Early 18th century	A red brick farmhouse on a stone plinth, with a band, a coved plaster eaves cornice, bracketed gutters, and a hipped tile roof. There are two storeys and seven bays, the middle three bays recessed. Three round steps lead up to a central doorway with a pedimented hood, and the windows are mullioned and transomed casements.	II
Davenport House; 52.55628°N 2.36494°W		1726	A country house designed by Francis Smith of Warwick, it is in red brick with buff sandstone dressings on a stone plinth, with rusticated quoins, a modillion cornice, and a parapet with four urns. The house consists of a main block with two storeys an attic and a basement, and nine bays on the front and five bays on the sides. This is flanked by quadrant walls with rusticated pilasters leading to service pavilions with two storeys, five bays, and hipped slate roofs with cupolas. In the centre is a porch with fluted Ionic columns, a cornice, and a balustraded parapet. The windows are sashes with moulded architraves, those in the ground floor also with entablatures.	I
9 Main Street; 52.55880°N 2.35789°W	—	18th century (probable)	A sandstone cottage with a tile roof. There is one storey and an attic, one bay, and a brick wing to the left. The doorway has a plain surround, there is one casement window on the front, and a gabled dormer.	II
Broad Bridge; 52.58082°N 2.35293°W		18th century	The bridge carries the B4176 road over the River Worfe. It is in stone, and consists of three segmental arches. The bridge has rusticated voussoirs, keystones, string courses, cutwaters, and pilasters with pyramidal caps.	II
Churchyard walls and gate piers 52.55915°N 2.35782°W		18th century (probable)	The walls enclosing the churchyard of St Peter's Church and the gate piers flanking the entrance are in sandstone. The gate piers have decorated pedimented caps.	II
Summer house, Chesterton Farm; 52.57198°N 2.31686°W	—	18th century (probable)	The summer house is at the end of the walled garden. It is in red brick with a tile roof, and has a square plan.	II
Pigeon House, Davenport House; 52.55741°N 2.36085°W		Mid 18th century	The dovecote is in red brick and has a circular plan. It contains two tiers of blind round-arched openings, those in the upper tier narrower, a decorative cornice, and an embattled parapet.	II
Hilton Manor; 52.55701°N 2.33198°W		18th century	A red brick house with a band and a parapet. There are three storeys, five bays, a single-storey two-bay wing on the left, and a two-storey two-bay wing on the right. The central doorway has a moulded architrave, a rectangular traceried fanlight, and a pediment, and the windows are sashes.	II
Former threshing barn, Lower Burcote Farm; 52.55162°N 2.37439°W	—	18th century	The barn, which has been altered, is in red sandstone, with brick dressings and a tiled roof. There are three bays, and in the front and rear are central doorways, each with a depressed arch. All fronts contain ventilation slits, in the apex of each gable is an owl hole, and there are nesting boxes under the eaves.	II
Rindleford Mill; 52.55707°N 2.38718°W		18th century	The watermill, which was extended in the 19th century, is in brick with some sandstone, a twin-span tile roof, and four storeys. In the centre is a double-height doorway and a wooden hoist gantry on the top floor. There are other doorways, and most of the windows are fixed and have segmental heads. In an extension is an undershot waterwheel in cast iron, wood and metal sheet measuring about 15 feet (4.6 m) in diameter and 7 feet (2.1 m) wide.	II
Roughton House; 52.54544°N 2.36033°W	—	18th century	A red brick house with wide eaves and a hipped tile roof. There are three storeys and three bays. In the middle bay is a doorway with Tuscan pilasters, a traceried fanlight, and an open pediment. Above it is a Venetian window and over that is a lunette. In the ground floor is a canopied verandah and French casement windows, and elsewhere the windows are sashes.	II*
Garden house, Swancote Farm House; 52.54402°N 2.38282°W	—	18th century	The garden house is at the side of the farmhouse, and it contains a pigeon loft.	II
Willowbrook; 52.54564°N 2.36441°W	—	18th century	The house is roughcast, with two bands, quoins, and a tile roof. There are two storeys and five bays. On the front is a projecting porch with a pointed arch, the windows are sashes, and there are three hip roofed dormers. At the rear is a pointed gable and a large bowed projection.	II
Ackleton House; 52.58709°N 2.33818°W		Late 18th century	A red brick house with stone dressings, deep eaves, and a hipped tile roof. There are three storeys, and symmetrical front of five bays, and a lower two-storey two-bay wing recessed to the left. In the centre is a porch with Doric columns and a dentilled cornice, and the windows are sashes.	II
Burcote House; 52.55114°N 2.37645°W	—	Late 18th century	A brick house with a hipped slate roof. There are two storeys and an attic, and three bays. The windows are a mix of sashes and casements.	II
Crow Cottage; 52.55872°N 2.35772°W	—	Late 18th century	A red brick house on a stone plinth, with a dentilled eaves cornice and a tile roof. There are two storeys and an attic, and three bays. The doorway has a hood on brackets, and the windows are sashes.	II
Mount Pleasant; 52.55622°N 2.33012°W	—	Late 18th century (probable)	A stone house with a hipped tile roof. There are two storeys and four bays, and the windows are casements.	II
Red Cow Inn; 52.58703°N 2.34052°W		Late 18th century (probable)	The public house is in red brick with stone dressings and a tile roof. There are three storeys, three bays, and a single-storey wing to the right. The central doorway has a moulded surround and reeded jambs, and the windows are sashes with rusticated lintels and keystones.	II
Stanmore Hall; 52.52770°N 2.38103°W	—	Late 18th century	The house has been extended; the original part is in brick with a tile roof. There are three storeys and three bays, and the windows are sashes. At the front is a later wing, and there is also a single-storey extension.	II
Swancote Farm House; 52.54409°N 2.38255°W	—	Late 18th century	The farmhouse is in brick with a band and a hipped tile roof. There are three storeys and three bays. In the centre is a doorway with Doric pilasters, a fanlight, and an open pediment. The windows are sashes, those in the ground floor are tripartite.	II
Wyken Cottage; 52.55227°N 2.35280°W	—	Late 18th century (probable)	A brick cottage with a tile roof, it has two storeys and an attic, and a gabled two-bay front. The doorway has a moulded surround and a cornice hood on consoles. To the left is a canted bay window, and above are sash windows.	II
1 Hilton; 52.55421°N 2.33241°W	—	1785	A red brick house with a dentilled eaves cornice, and a tile roof with parapeted gable ends. There are two storeys and an attic, three bays, and a rear service wing. The central doorway has a canopy, most of the windows are mullioned and transomed casements, and under the eaves is a datestone.	II
South Lodge, Apley Park; 52.55556°N 2.40463°W	—	c. 1812	The entrance to the park is in engraved stucco, and in the centre is a covered way with a pointed arched head and a hood mould. This is flanked by small two-storey one-bay lodges, each with a sash window in a moulded surround with a hood mould. The whole structure has angle buttresses, a moulded cornice, and embattled parapets.	II
15 Main Street; 52.55933°N 2.35733°W	—	Early 19th century	A red brick house with a tile roof, two storeys and three bays. The doorway has a moulded surround with pilasters and a cornice hood, and the windows are sashes.	II
11 and 12 Worfield; 52.55898°N 2.35794°W	—	Early 19th century	A pair of cottages in painted brick with a tile roof, probably over an earlier core. There is one storey and attics, and the cottages contain two doorways with plain surrounds, four casement windows with cambered heads, and five gabled dormers.	II
2 and 3 Wyken Cottages; 52.55225°N 2.35261°W	—	Early 19th century	A pair of brick cottages with tile roofs, casement windows, and doorways with gabled hoods. No. 2 has two storeys and an attic, two bays, and a gabled roof dormer. No. 3 has one storey and a attic, and two gabled eaves dormers.	II
Ackleton Hall; 52.58554°N 2.33891°W	—	Early 19th century	The house is in roughcast brick with deep eaves and a tile roof. There are three storeys, three bays, and a lower timber framed rear wing. The doorway has Doric columns, a fanlight, and a pediment, and the windows are sashes.	II
Allscott Farmhouse; 52.56243°N 2.38902°W	—	Early 19th century	The farmhouse is in red brick with a dentilled cornice and a tile roof. There are three storeys, three bays, and a lower recessed wing to the left. The central doorway has a triangular pediment, and the windows are sashes.	II
Burcote Villa; 52.54793°N 2.38762°W	—	Early 19th century	The house is in brick with a hipped tile roof, two storeys, and three bays. The central doorway has a moulded surround and a bracketed cornice hood, and the windows are sashes with segmental lintels and keyblocks.	II
Cranmere Cottage; 52.57829°N 2.35705°W	—	Early 19th century	A brick house with deep eaves and a hipped slate roof. There are two storeys and three bays. The doorway has a moulded surround and a fanlight, and the windows are sashes.	II
Davenport Arms; 52.55788°N 2.35740°W		Early 19th century	The public house is in red brick over earlier timber framing, with dentilled eaves, and a tile roof. There are two storeys and an attic, and three bays. On the front is a gabled porch, and there is exposed timber framing with red brick infill in the right gable end.	II
Hallan Farm House; 52.56010°N 2.36286°W	—	Early 19th century	The farmhouse is stuccoed over earlier timber framing, with ornamental pierced eaves, and a tile roof. There are two storeys, six bays, and an E-shaped plan with three projecting gabled wings on the front. The doorway has a plain surround, the windows are sashes with hood moulds, and there is exposed timber framing in the right gable end.	II
Lowe Cottage; 52.55538°N 2.35443°W	—	Early 19th century	The house is partly in colour-washed brick, and partly in painted stucco, and it has a slate roof. There are two storeys, three bays, and rear extensions. The central doorway has a moulded surround, a fanlight, and a pediment on columns, and the windows are casements.	II
Newton Farm House; 52.57042°N 2.39681°W	—	Early 19th century	The farmhouse is in brick with a tile roof, three storeys, and three bays. On the front is a flat-roofed porch, and the windows are sashes.	II
Lodge, Roughton Hall; 52.54537°N 2.35898°W		Early 19th century	The lodge is in brick with a front of stone, deep eaves, and a pyramidal slate roof. There is one storey and a rectangular plan. On the front is a doorway with a segmental head, flanked by windows with pointed heads.	II
Stableford Farm House; 52.58416°N 2.35751°W	—	Early 19th century	A brick house with deep eaves and a hipped slate roof. There are two storeys and three bays. On the front is a stone porch with Doric pillars, and the windows are sashes with moulded keyblocks.	II
The Post Office, Shop Cottage and Nos. 4 and 5 Main Street; 52.55838°N 2.35764°W		Early 19th century	A row of a shop and three cottages that originated as a workhouse. They are in painted brick with dentilled eaves and have a tile roof. There is one storey and attics, the windows are casements, and there are five gabled dormers.	II
Wyken Grange; 52.55224°N 2.35236°W	—	Early 19th century	A red brick house with a hipped slate roof, three storeys and two bays. The central doorway has Doric columns and an entablature, and the windows are sashes, those in the lower two floors with segmental lintels and keystones.	II
Barn, stable and cowhouse range, Sonde Farm; 52.56068°N 2.35528°W	—	Early to mid 19th century	The range of farm buildings is in red brick and has tile roofs with coped gables and stone kneelers. There is an L-shaped plan, with a three-barn and a lower cowhouse in the main range, and stables at right angles. The barn has a large cart doorway with a segmental arch, a round pitching hole and ventilation holes, the cowhouse contains doorways and windows, and the stable has doorways, windows, a pitching hole and pigeon holes; all the doorways and windows have segmental heads.	II
Worfield Church of England Primary School; 52.55838°N 2.35671°W		1846	The school was extended in 1876 and again in the 20th century. It is Tudor style, and built in red sandstone, and has tiled roofs with coped gable ends and corbelled kneelers. The school initially had two classrooms forming a T-shaped plan and a schoolmaster's house. In 1874 two more classrooms were added as a cross-wing, with another house and an office, forming a U-shaped plan. Most of the windows are mullioned and transomed, and other features include a canted bay window, an embattled oriel window, and three gabled dormers.	II
Rindleford Bridge; 52.55724°N 2.38805°W		19th century (probable	A footbridge crossing the River Worfe, it is a planked beam bridge. It has four spans, and is laid on the stone foundations of a former packhorse bridge. There are stone abutments at the ends, and cutwaters on both sides.	II
Worfield War memorial 52.55655°N 2.35814°W		c. 1920	The war memorial is in the triangular village green at a road junction. It has a limestone plinth with a moulded shelf, on which is a glazed timber cabinet. The cabinet has a gable with a shingled roof with a crucifix in the gable space, and below this is a recessed panel. On the front of the plinth is a brass panel with an inscription relating to the First World War.	II
K6 Telephone kiosk, Chesterton; 52.57217°N 2.31773°W		1935	A K6 type telephone kiosk, designed by Giles Gilbert Scott. Constructed in cast iron with a square plan and a dome, it has three unperforated crowns in the top panels.	II
K6 Telephone kiosk, Worfield; 52.55817°N 2.35754°W		1935	A K6 type telephone kiosk, designed by Giles Gilbert Scott. Constructed in cast iron with a square plan and a dome, it has three unperforated crowns in the top panels.	II
