= Stanwick Hall, Northamptonshire =

18th-century building in England

Coordinates: 52.3302°N 0.5702°W

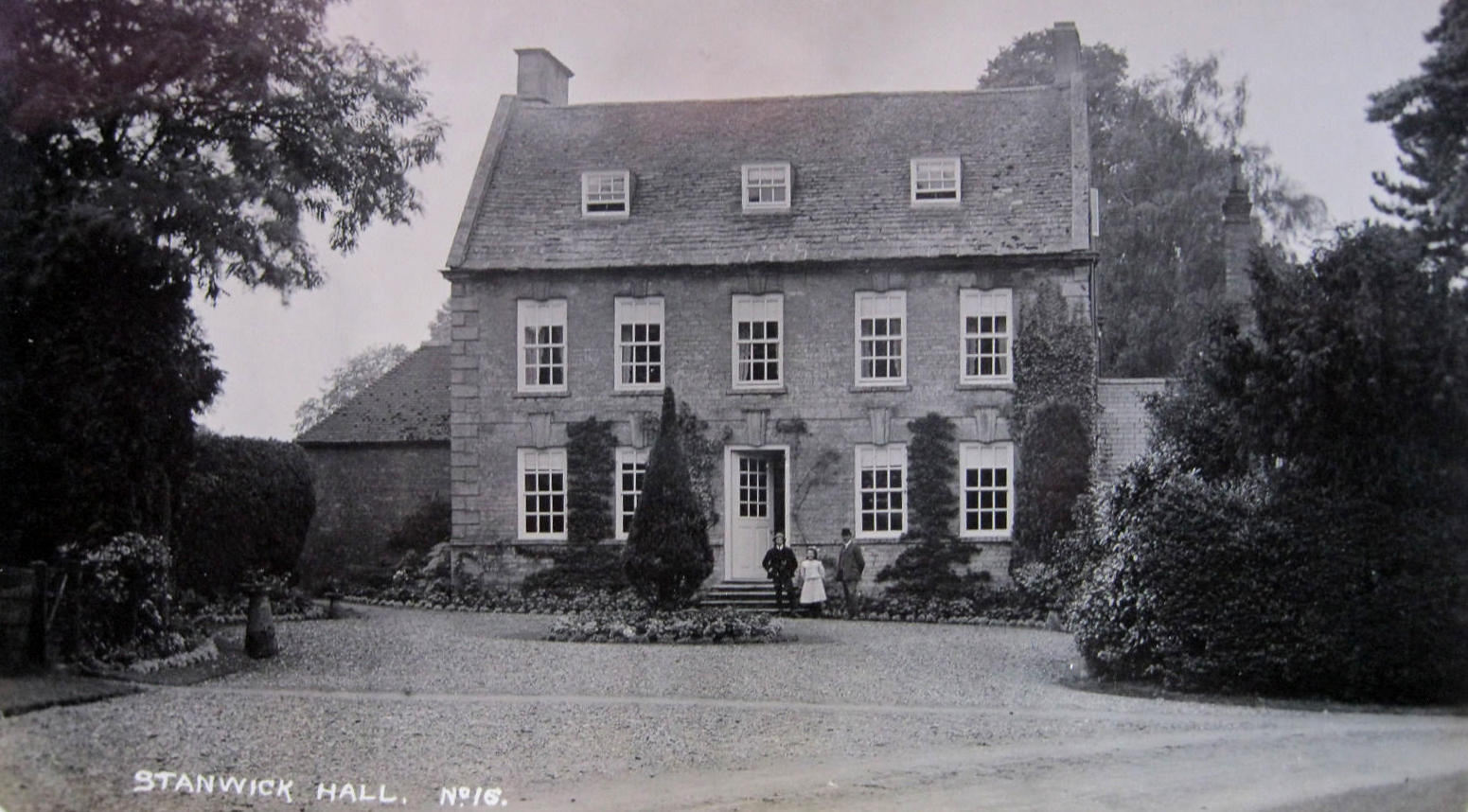
19th century postcard

Stanwick Hall is a largely Georgian grade II* listed building located in the western end of the village of Stanwick, in the North Northamptonshire district, in the ceremonial county of Northamptonshire, England.

== History ==
The house was originally constructed in the C17, possibly earlier. Evidence of this original building is scant but survives:

- The cellars/basement predate the house constructed above, the west elevation of which features a pair of dateable C17 3 light stone mullion windows
- This is corroborated by a C19 Victorian pencil sketch, which not only records the extant mullion windows, but also a doorway of the same era accessing the cellar/basement midway between them. This doorway was subsequently blocked, with no external trace remaining for many years, before being reinstated in around 2010
- A 1722 "notice to lett" for the original C17 house (broadly similar to future adverts relating to letting or selling the Hall) offers few clues to the form of the original building, other than "...four rooms on a floor...", which interestingly is carried over into the current building, described exactly as such in 1802, some 60 years post rebuild. This may be a coincidence, but may also hint at extensive remodelling where internal walls were possibly retained, rather than full demolition and a complete 1740s basement-up new build.
- The presence of full-height C17 panelling with frieze decorated with scrolls in the central first floor room would also appear to be a significant, dateable remnant feature of the original house. However, as is explained below, the house suffered a major fire on 2 April 1931, with only the bare walls remaining. Either the effects of the fire were exaggerated & the panelling originates form the original house, or it was taken from another building and fitted during the rebuild following the fire, or even during the 1740s construction phase.

The Hall as it appears today was built in 1742-1743 for James Lambe (d.1761) by William Smith (1705-1747) at a cost of £750 (about £150,000 in modern terms.)

William Smith was an acclaimed Architect and Builder and was the son of Francis Smith of Warwick. William Smith was involved as architect, builder or mason in many major projects, including the Radcliffe Camera, Catton Hall, Kirtlington Park, Thame Park and Stoneleigh Abbey, on which he worked with his father. Stoneleigh Abbey was immortalized by Jane Austen in her novel Mansfield Park, in which Stoneleigh Abbey becomes Sotherton Court.

After the death of James Lambe, Stanwick Hall was advertised as for sale on several occasions. The sale notice lists Stanwick Hall "...a modern, stone-built capital mansion...", a coach house, two dove houses, two barns, three 3-stall stables, two other stables with convenient outbuildings, a dog kennel and boiling house with constant running water. It included 30 acres of rich pasture in three closes (Nether Close, Dove House Close and Upper Close, called the Cherry Orchard). There were 15 acres at Stanwick Pastures, to the east of the village and a further 97 acres of arable, ley and pasture ground in the open fields around the village.

In its original C17 form the house was immediately adjacent to what was then the main road into Stanwick from the west, but in common with many country estates of the era, at some point the public road was moved to skirt around the perimeter of the property to the north. This probably occurred at the time of the house rebuild and the laying out of new landscaped 'pleasure gardens', along with walled gardens for fruit and vegetable production, all enclosed and hidden from public eyes behind newly constructed high stone walls (identical walls of the same era were erected around sections of the adjacent Ivy Cottage). The modest Ha-ha to the west of the Hall probably dates from this era also. Finally, with the completion of the 'New Road' in 1821 to link a new coal wharf recently built close to the village mill on the river Nene to Stanwick and onwards to Chelveston the main road from the west into the village took its final form, becoming the new northern perimeter of Nether Close.

In 1931, there was a major fire that started in one of the lower rooms. The owners escaped and no one was killed but the building was gutted. The building was placed on the English Heritage "At Risk" Register, with fungus growing on damp walls, roof tiles broken and roof timbers in danger of collapsing at any moment.

The building was purchased in 2007. A major restoration project started by the new owners was the subject of a BBC Restoration Home programme in 2011.

== Verified occupants ==
- 1743 James Lambe. Born 1692 in Hackney Middlesex, son of James Lambe, haberdasher, James was one of the few individuals who made money from the South Sea Company's Africa-South America slave trading. Having rebuilt Stanwick Hall, through marriage to Esther Barker whose family bought Fairford Park in 1650, his main home became Fairford Park where he became Lord of the manor
- 1761 Death of James Lambe at Fairford Park. Despite numerous properties appearing in James' will, none of them are recorded as being in Northamptonshire, suggesting James may have sold the Hall following its rebuild and his relocation to Fairford Park.
- 1791 Estate of 130 acres, including a house described as 'modern stone built capital mansion house' advertised to be sold on behalf of an unknown vendor. The Earl of Egmont. John Perceval, 3rd Earl of Egmont, (the brother of Spencer Perceval, who remains the only Prime Minister of the United Kingdom to have been assassinated.) is shown as the then tenant.
- 1801 George Gascoyne snr, born in nearby Great Addington appears on the Land Tax register for Stanwick, owing around £40 for that year (second only to the Rev. Pearce, who owes around £73). This confirms the period where ownership of the Hall, adjacent Hall farm and Ivy Cottage, Stanwick are transferred from the Lambes to the Gascoynes (/Gascoyens/Gascoignes), as evidenced by the tithe map
- 1802 "George Gascoyne senr Gent. of Little Addington" advertises the Hall for rent "...now in the occupation of the Rev. Mr [Philip Castel] Sherrard" and moves to the adjacent Ivy Cottage
- Following the Enclosure Acts, which came to Stanwick 1834-8, the Gascoynes becomes one of the five major landowners in Stanwick.
- 1841 Death of George Gascoyne senr.
- 1841-61: censuses George Gascoyne jnr .(farmer) Frances and family, resident Stanwick Hall
- 1863 Death of George Gascoyne jnr. Contents of Hall auctioned, including "The genteel and excellent Drawing, Dining, Bedroom, Kitchen and other FURNITURE, BEDDING, CHINA, GLASS, EARTHENWARE, BOOKS, PIANO-FORTE…"
- 1865 Stanwick Hall to let "with or without a little grass land..." by George Goodhall Gascoyne
- 1870 Cecil Wetenhall resident, Stanwick Hall.
- 1871 census: Cecil Wetenhall (living off property dividends) and family resident at the Hall.
- 1873 Start of the 1873-96 Great depression of British agriculture
- 1881 census: Thomas Somes (farmer of 606 acres) & family resident at the Hall.
- 1882: Thomas and James Somes.
- 1887 Michaelmas: Joseph Baxter takes on tenancy of Stanwick Hall and Hall farm. Owner of both (and Ivy cottage) confirmed as Robert Loyd-Lindsay, 1st Baron Wantage
- 1891-1911 censuses: William James Backwell (farm and cattle dealer Sarah Blackwell and family resident the Hall
- 1915 Colonel Fawcett resident Stanwick Hall.
- 1918 Walter Denton, farmer, acquires Stanwick Hall, Hall farm, Ivy Cottage and two cottages
- 1921 census: William Blackwell (farmer) and son resident, the Hall. Elizabeth Blackwell (widow & mother of William) and daughter Annie resident Ivy Cottage.
- 1936 Walter Denton sells Stanwick Hall and Hall farm, but retains Ivy cottage as his residence. Ivy cottage now separated from Hall and Hall farm for the first time in generations
- 1936 PH Lamb, Bedford, new owners of Stanwick Hall and Hall farm.
- 1939 England and Wales register: Richard G Skinner (farmer) tenant of the Hall.
- July 1977 Stanwick Hall and Hall farm auctioned for sale by PH Lamb of Bedford. Tenant Richard G Skinner retires from farming
- 2006–present: The Russell family.

== Likely or unknown occupants ==
- 1722 A large unnamed Stanwick house, the description of which is very similar to how future to let or for sale advertisements describe what will become known as Stanwick Hall, advertised to let, by unknown owner. Enquires to Reverend John Morton (naturalist) of Stanwick, or Thomas Flawn, Attleborough.
- 1731 William Lambe the elder, attorney at law, recorded resident of Stanwick, address not given. Born in Great Addington, son of Robert Lambe, nephew to Rev. John Lambe, (Rector of Church of St Laurence, Stanwick 1673-1717, last resident of Stanwick rectory, prior to its 1717 rebuild in a style very similar to the future Hall: The Old Rectory, Stanwick) William has his first Stanwick-born child, also William, baptised at Stanwick Church.
- The relationship between James Lambe of Hackney/Fairford Park and the Northamptonshire Lambes remains unproven, and although unlikely, may be coincidental. However, one of the beneficiaries of James' will of 1761 is given as "...my couzin Robert Lambe..." There are at least two Great Addington Robert Lambes alive at the time of James' death, but any relationship between them has yet to be established.
- 1750 A Mr Lambe recorded as being the owner of a property with 33 windows (second only to the Rectory, with 43) on Stanwick window tax inventory of that year This most likely refers to the newly remodelled Stanwick Hall, which would have been one of only four houses in the village large enough to sport anything like this number of windows at this time.
- 1762 William Lambe, attorney, on Stanwick Militia list
- 1767 Death of William Lambe the elder. Despite owning numerous properties in several Northamptonshire Parishes, his will records nothing in Stanwick.
- 1780 Death of William Lambe the younger. With no inherited property from his father being recorded as being in Stanwick, William must have either inherited it from elsewhere, or purchased his Stanwick properties, which amongst others he wills to "...my half-brother Samuel Ward Lambe..."
- 1781 Ward Lambe, farmer, on Stanwick Militia list
- 1788 Death of Samuel Ward. Samuel would appear to be the last Lambe to be likely resident of the Hall, although it appears to still be in Lambe ownership until at least 1792 - see 'to let' advertisement of 1792 below)
- 1792 Stanwick Hall, described as 'capital stone built mansion house', along with 3 closes of 30 acres advertised to let by unknown vendor. Advertisement adjoins another to let notice for Great Addington Manor on behalf of Mary Lambe (heiress to her uncles' William the elder of Stanwick, and Rev. Robert Lambe of Great Addington estates) and husband William Zouch which strongly suggests Mary also owned Stanwick Hall at this time
- 1795 Estate of around 37 acres, including the Hall, described as a 'modern, strong, stone-built capital mansion house' advertised for sale.

== Hall Farm ==
As the name suggests, Hall Farm has a long association with the adjoining Stanwick Hall.

=== Pre-Victorian farm ===
- The current post 1863 Victorian model farm buildings replace a range of much earlier buildings aligned north-south in plan, and located adjacent to Ivy Cottage to the east. Details of the earlier farm are found at Ivy Cottage, Stanwick
- 1863 The original farm was likely demolished shortly after the dispersal sale of its live and deadstock, following the death of George Gascoyne the younger.

=== Victorian model farm ===
The current buildings are not shown on any detailed maps up to and including the Stanwick Inclosure map of 1838, and first appear on the OS map of 1880, shown as a E-shaped, double courtyard plan, typical of many model farms of the area at this time:

[They] were recommended from the mid-18th century and many are documented from this period, though no surviving examples can be dated before the 1790s. The earlier examples are courtyard or U-plan with the barn forming the central block and shelter sheds, stables and enclosed cow houses the two side wings. The fourth side was no more than a wall with a gateway, or contained further sheds or smaller buildings such as pigsties, or was distinguished by a house (usually looking away from the yard). From the 1820s and 1830s, extra yards made E or even double-E plans.

The ultimate examples of courtyard farmsteads are the planned and model farms of the late 18th and 19th-century estates, the ideas for which were widely disseminated in textbooks and journals (Wade Martins 2002) they are generally associated with holdings over 150 acres, and are far less likely than the other plan types to be associated with other loose scatters of buildings.

The commonly held consensus in 20th century Stanwick was that Hall Farm was constructed as a model farm by Lord Overstone, Samuel Jones-Loyd, 1st Baron Overstone in the 1860s. This has yet to be verified, as the earliest evidence found of his ownership of the farm and Hall is from 1887 but he does appears to have links with the Manor of Stanwick as early as 1862.

On his death in 1883 most of his vast estate including Hall Farm, Stanwick Hall and Ivy Cottage passed to his daughter Lady Wantage, Harriet Loyd-Lindsay, Baroness Wantage whose estate included numerous farms throughout Northamptonshire.

In 1908, she still owns Hall Farm, and as a "...token of their great esteem and regard" her Northamptonshire farm tenants arranged a presentation of photographs of themselves for her, taken at their respective farms, including the tenant of Hall Farm at this time, Thomas Blackwell.

== Dove House, formerly Ivy Cottage ==
Ivy Cottage is a largely C17 grade II listed building located some 50m east of Stanwick Hall Ivy Cottage was traditionally the farm house to the adjacent farm, with the Hall the gentleman's residence (although also frequently inhabited by the same farming family). Being part of the same estate, both properties sharing several hundred years of intertwined history with for example, the extended farming families of both the C18 Gascoyne and C20 Blackwell families occupying both houses simultaneously over many years. However, whilst the Hall and estate were freehold, Ivy Cottage and estate were a Copyhold property as late as 1891 and as such, separately owned by the Lord of the manor of Stanwick. A detailed description and history can be found at Ivy Cottage, Stanwick
