= Ivy Cottage, Stanwick =

17th-century building in England

Coordinates: 52°19′51″N 0°33′59″W

Ivy Cottage is a largely 17th-century Grade II listed building located towards the west end of the village of Stanwick, in the North Northamptonshire district.

== Alternative names ==
- 1853–1891 Stanwick Cottage
- 1861–1953 Ivy Cottage
- 1911, 1932 The Cottage
- 1954–1999 Dovehouse Close This was a misnomer created in the 1950s - Dove house Close, or Dove Cote Close was actually the name of a close adjacent to Ivy Cottage owned and farmed by the residents of Ivy Cottage when a farmhouse, presumably named after a now vanished dovecote
- Currently Dove House (2026)

== House history ==
The house was originally constructed in either the late C16 or early C 17 as the farmhouse to an adjoining farm of the same era.

== Farm and estate history ==
- The original C16 / C17 farm is depicted on the Stanwick tithe map of the 1840s constructed on a north-south axis located to the immediate west of Ivy Cottage. It does not appear on the first detailed OS map of the site, having already been demolished and replaced with a model farm built in the 1860s by the Gascoynes, tenants/owners of both Ivy Cottage and the adjacent Stanwick Hall, Northamptonshire
- 1780 Farmhouse and farm advertised for sale, 14th February A Capital FARM, To be LETT, AND Entered upon at Lady-Day next, (Old-Stile) at STANWICK, near Higham Ferrers, in the County of Northampton: Confisting of an exceeding good Farm-Houfe, with Cellars, a Hall, Parlour, Kitchen, Dairy, Brewhouse, two Pantries, fix Chambers and one Garret. The Out-Offices are comprifed of a Corn-Barn of five Bays, a Stable adjoining of two Bays, a Three-stall Stable, a Hog’s-Court, Cow-House, Calves-Pens, (the Whole replete with all neceffary Conveniences) a large Cherry-Orchard, feveral Home-Closes, with 196 computed Acres of Arable and Ley Ground, 91 Acres of Pafture (inclofed) 21 Acres of Meadow, Commons for 196 Sheep and 21 Cows. Enquire of Alderman [Richard Roberts] Drake, in Leicefter.List of lord mayors of Leicester N.B. There are feveral ufeful Hovels on the Premifes to accommodate a Tenant with. Drake may be the owner, but could also be acting as estate agent on behalf of the Lambe family
- 1841 Farmhouse and farm advertised for sale, 6 April, vendor not given Lot 10. All that MESSAUGE, TENEMENT, or FARM-HOUSE. with the Buildings, Fold, and Rickyard, with about 57A. 1R. 31P. of old-inclosed and newly-allotted Freehold and Copyhold Plots or Parcels of Arable and Pasture LAND or GROUND, situate in the Parish of Stanwick, and divided into the following Inclosures:- that is to say, Farm-House, Buildings and Rickyard 0-2-2 [A-R-P] Dove Cote Close (Pasture) 2-3-36 Allotment adjoining Dove Cote Close 0-1-5 Home Close 2-2-35 Part of Nether Close 1-0-34 The Like 0-3-34 Wych Spinney (Garden) 0-1-35 Dobb's Grove Close (Wood) 0-1-10 Fox Spinney 0-3-9 Dobb's Grove 0-1-10 Allotment in Raunds Field (part Arable and part Pasture) 6-0-1 Allotment in Watery Lane 0-0-1 Mill Ditch Close (Pasture) 6-0-1 Freehold and Copyhold Allotments in meadow of which about 14A. 2R. 4P. are Freehold 22-3-19 Total 57-1-31
- 1863 following the death of George Gascoyen the younger, further details of the old farm are revealed in an advertisement for the dispersal sale of the farm's dead and livestock:

COMPRISING 250 sheep, 40 head of Cattle, 10 Horses, store Hogs, pure-bred Berkshire Sows, four Waggons, six Carts, excellent Water-cart, Suffolk Drill, manure Drill, iron and wood ploughs, ridge Ditto, several sets of iron Harrows, iron and wood Rolls, eight horse Cribs, 12 sheep ditto, two dozen sheep Troughs, chaff-cutting Machine, with horse power [horse engine]: winnowing Machine, and general Barn Tackle, sack weighing Machines, two oil cake Crushers, bean Mill, horse Hoes, ladders, Hurdles, Sacks, Ropes, Forks, Rakes, corn Drags, 10 sets of horse Harness, plough Chains, Gears, and general implements.

The sales particulars give an insight into a relatively large, prosperous post Inclosure Act farm just prior to the industrial revolution that would radically transform agriculture in the same way it would transport and manufacturing. Having employed a horse engine to power the winnower, chaff-cutter and other small machines, the farm would have been considered reasonably modern in the 1840s, towards the end of Georges father’s tenure. However, by 1863 it was already obsolete, and would be swept away with the building of the replacement Hall farm to the immediate west

== Ownership and tenancy history ==
- 1801 George Gascoyne senr born in nearby Great Addington appears on the Land Tax register for Stanwick, owing around £40 for that year (second only to the Rev. Pearce, who owes around £73). This confirms the period where ownership of Ivy cottage, the associated adjacent farm and Stanwick Hall, Northamptonshire are transferred from the Lambes to the Gascoynes (/Gascoyens/Gascoignes)
- 1802 "George Gascoyne senr Gent. of Little Addington" advertises the Hall for rent "...now in the occupation of the Rev. Mr Sherrard" and moves to Ivy Cottage
- Following the Enclosure Acts, which came to Stanwick 1834-8, the Gascoynes becomes one of the five major landowners in Stanwick.
- 1841 Death of George Gascoyne senr.
- 1841 census: Green Gascoyne jnr (farmer) wife Mary and family resident, Ivy Cottage. Green's older brother George Gascoyne jnr (farmer) wife Frances and family resident at the adjoining Stanwick Hall, Northamptonshire 1841-61
- 1851 census: Green Gascoyne (farmer of 220 acres employing 10 labourers) Mary and family resident, Ivy Cottage
- 1853 Rev. John B Walcot, Baptist minister and family, including his 4th daughter Martha resident, Ivy Cottage. Martha marries C Gamble of Derby (recorded as living in Ivy Cottage in 1865 - see below.) It is worth noting that Green's father George was, like the Rev. Walcot, a fellow Baptist, having had the birth of his children, Ann and George jnr, registered not at Little Addington church, (Little Addington being the place of their birth) but Silver Street Baptist Chapel Kettering. For a wealthy landowner of the time, this is remarkable.
- 1858 Green Goodhall dies, his oldest son George Goodhall Gascoyne and wife Elen move to Ivy Cottage.
- 1861 census: George Goodhall Gascoyne (farmer of 300 acres, employing 12 men, 7 boys, 1 shepherd, letter of thrashy [sic] machines employing 4 men) Elen and family resident Ivy Cottage.
- 1861 Melville's Trade directory: George Goodhall Gascoyne resident, Ivy Cottage
- 1863 Death of George Gascoyne jnr. Contents of adjacent Stanwick Hall and farm auctioned
- 1865 Mr C Gamble resident, Ivy Cottage. Given Ivy Cottage is shown occupied by George Goodhall and Elen Gascoyne for both the 1861 and 1871 censuses, Mr Gamble and the Rev. John B Walcot before him must have been lodging at Ivy cottage.
- 1871 census: Elen Gascoyne (wife of George Goodhall Gascoyne - absent for census) and family resident at Ivy Cottage.
- 1873 Start of the 1873-96 Great depression of British agriculture
- 1878: George Goodhall Gascoyne declares bankruptcy and vacates Ivy Cottage and adjoining recently built (1860s) Hall farm.
- 1880 Mr RC Alston Esq. vacates Ivy Cottage "For terms, apply to Mr Somes" This seems likely to be Rowland Crewe Alston JP MA who otherwise lived 8 miles away at Odell Castle.
- 1881 census: Frank Wright (retired wine merchant) and wife Matilda resident, Ivy Cottage.
- 1887 Michaelmas: Owner of Ivy cottage (together with adjacent Stanwick Hall, Northamptonshire and Hall farm) confirmed as Robert Loyd-Lindsay, 1st Baron Wantage
- 1891 census: Thomas (farmer) and Elizabeth Blackwell and family resident at 56 High St (presumed to be Ivy Cottage, which isn't named)
- 1894 Joseph Baxter resident, Ivy Cottage
- Thomas Blackwell, (farmer) wife Elizabeth and family resident Ivy Cottage.
- 1906 & 1910 Thomas Blackwell resident, Ivy Cottage
- 1911 census: Thomas Blackwell, (farmer) "...one of the best know agriculturalists in the north part of the county..." wife Elizabeth and family resident, Ivy Cottage.
- 1918: Walter Denton, farmer, acquires Stanwick Hall, Hall farm, Ivy Cottage and two cottages
- 1921 census: Elizabeth Blackwell (widow & mother of William) and daughter Annie resident Ivy Cottage.
- 1924 Walter Denton resident, Ivy Cottage
- 1936 Walter Denton sells Stanwick Hall and Hall farm, but retains Ivy cottage as his residence. Ivy cottage now separated from Hall and Hall farm for the first time in generations.
- 1939 England and Wales register: Walter Denton (retired farmer) and Martha MA Denton resident, Ivy Cottage.
- 1941 Walter Denton, retired farmer "...one of the four leading farmers in Northamptonshire in his day..." resident at Ivy Cottage.
- 1948 30 May, Death of Walter Denton
- 1953 Contents of Ivy Cottage auctioned
