= Ackleton =

Village in Shropshire, England

Coordinates: 52.586°N 2.340°W

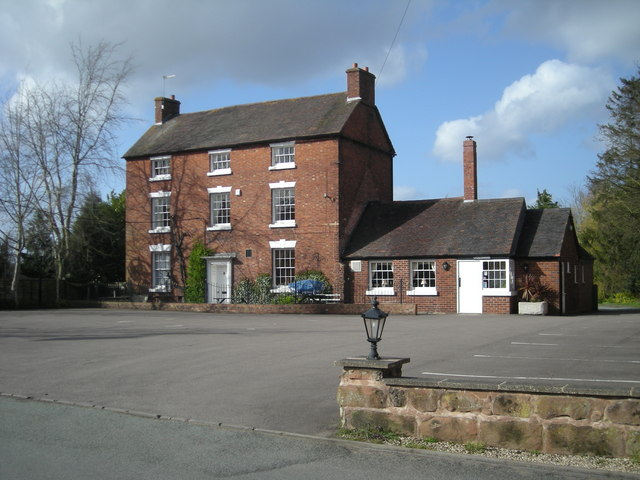
- The Red Cow public house, Ackleton

- Location within Shropshire
- OS grid reference: SO769988
- Civil parish: Worfield
- Unitary authority: Shropshire
- Ceremonial county: Shropshire
- Region: West Midlands
- Country: England
- Sovereign state: United Kingdom
- Post town: WOLVERHAMPTON
- Postcode district: WV6
- Dialling code: 01746
- Police: West Mercia
- Fire: Shropshire
- Ambulance: West Midlands
- UK Parliament: Ludlow

Ackleton is a village in the English county of Shropshire. It is in the civil parish of Worfield.

Lying some 7 miles (11 km) from the market town of Bridgnorth, the village is the home of the two pubs with restaurants, The Red Cow and The Folley.

Ackleton is believed to have inspired the fictional village of Eckleton in writings of P. G. Wodehouse, whose parents lived in nearby Stableford.

== See also ==
- Listed buildings in Worfield
