= Ernest Cook =

British philanthropist and art collector (1865–1955)

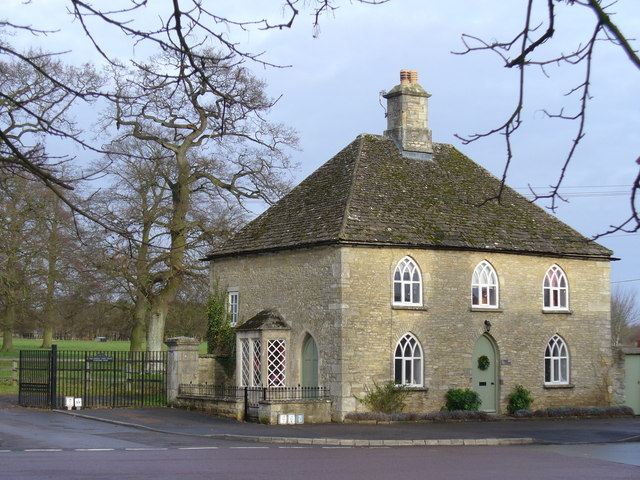
South Lodge, at the entrance to Fairford Park, one of Ernest Cook's estates in Gloucestershire

Ernest Edward Cook (4 September 1865 – 14 March 1955) was an English philanthropist and businessman. He was a grandson of Thomas Cook, the travel entrepreneur.

Cook was born in Camberwell, London and educated at Mill Hill School, as were his two brothers Frank and Thomas. He entered the family travel business, and developed its banking operations. In 1928, along with his brother Frank, he sold his business interest in the family firm to the Compagnie Internationale des Wagons-Lits.

Following the sale, Cook retired to Bath, and devoted himself to his art collection and the acquisition of country estates. He accumulated a large collection of fine and decorative art, which on his death became the largest bequest ever left to the National Art Collections Fund. In 1931 he acquired Montacute House in Somerset and the Bath Assembly Rooms for the Society for the Protection of Ancient Buildings.

He became a major benefactor of the National Trust, and encouraged the Trust to acquire historic country houses and estates. Montacute House and the Assembly Rooms were transferred to the National Trust. In 1938 he acquired Hartwell House, Buckinghamshire when it was threatened with demolition. The contents were sold off by public auction. Cook acquired a total of seventeen estates, of which Bradenham, Buscot and Coleshill passed to the National Trust.

In 1952 Cook founded the Ernest Cook Trust, and transferred seven estates to it.
