= Davenport House, Worfield =

Listed building in Shropshire, England

Davenport House
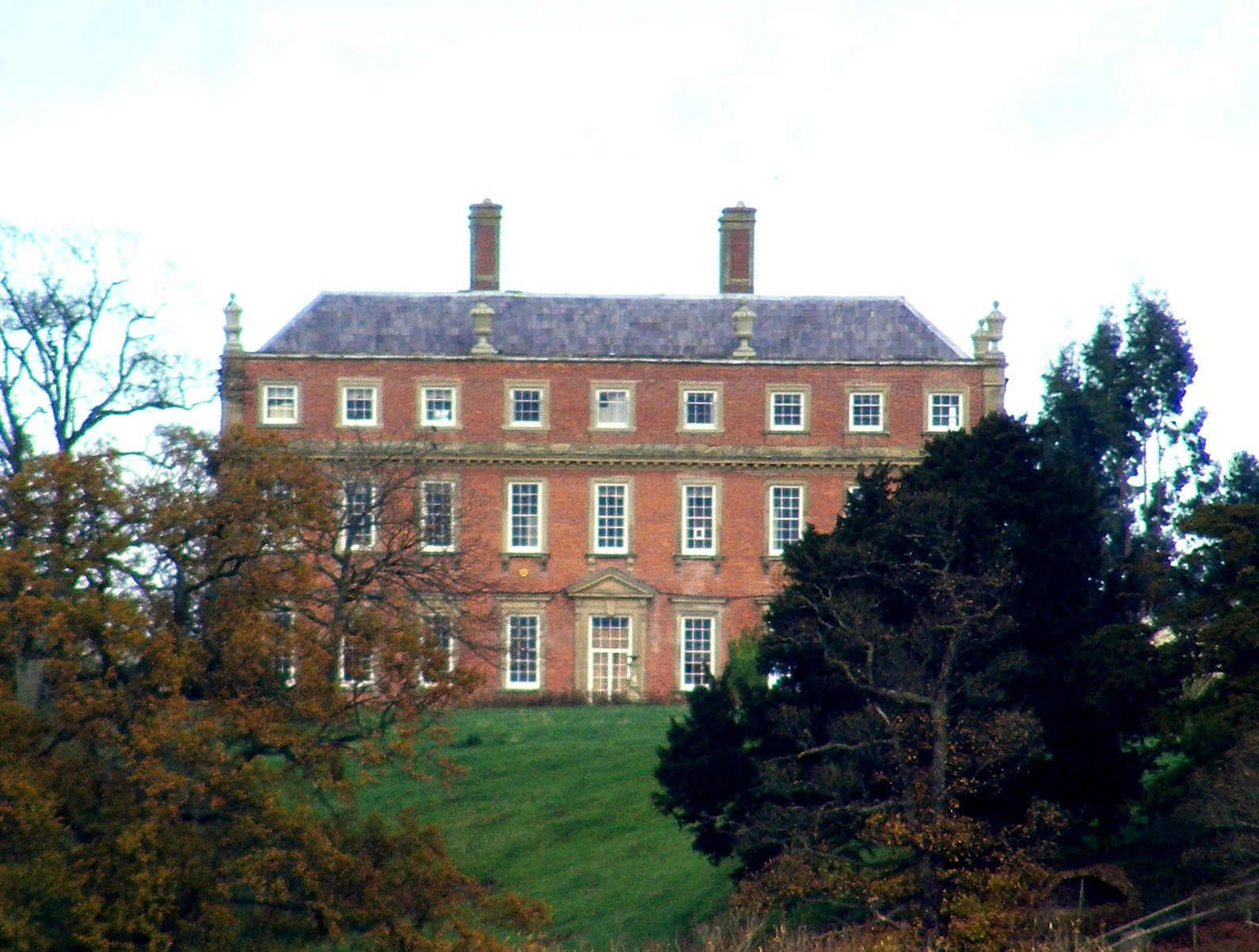
- The rear of the house in 2010, seven years before its restoration
- Interactive map of the Davenport House area

General information
- Architectural style: Georgian
- Location: Worfield, Shropshire, England
- Coordinates: 52°33′23″N 2°21′54″W
- Completed: 1726
- Client: Henry Davenport

Technical details
- Floor count: 2 + cellar + attic

Design and construction
- Architect: Francis Smith of Warwick
- Designations

Listed Building – Grade I
- Official name: Davenport House
- Designated: 29 November 1951
- Reference no.: 1053732

National Register of Historic Parks and Gardens
- Designated: 1 December 1986
- Reference no.: 1001120

Website
- Official website

Davenport House is a historic country house in the English village of Worfield, Shropshire. Located to the southwest of the village centre, it was built in 1726, and is a Grade I listed building. Its grounds are Grade II* listed.

The house was built by the architect Francis Smith of Warwick for Henry Davenport. It is in red brick with buff sandstone dressings on a stone plinth, with rusticated quoins, a modillion cornice, and a parapet with four urns. The house consists of a main block with two storeys an attic and a basement, and nine bays on the front and five bays on the sides. This is flanked by quadrant walls with rusticated pilasters leading to service pavilions with two storeys, five bays, and hipped slate roofs with cupolas. In the centre is a porch with fluted Ionic columns, a cornice, and a balustraded parapet. The windows are sashes with moulded architraves, those in the ground floor also with entablatures.

Restored in 2017, it is now used for events such as weddings, conferences and private parties. It is privately owned by The Trustees of JRS Davenport-Greenshields associated with the Davenport Estate in Shropshire, England

== See also ==
- Listed buildings in Worfield
- Grade I listed buildings in Shropshire
