= Fairford Leys =

Estate in Aylesbury, Buckinghamshire, England

Coordinates: 51.8152°N 0.8379°W

Fairford Leys centre
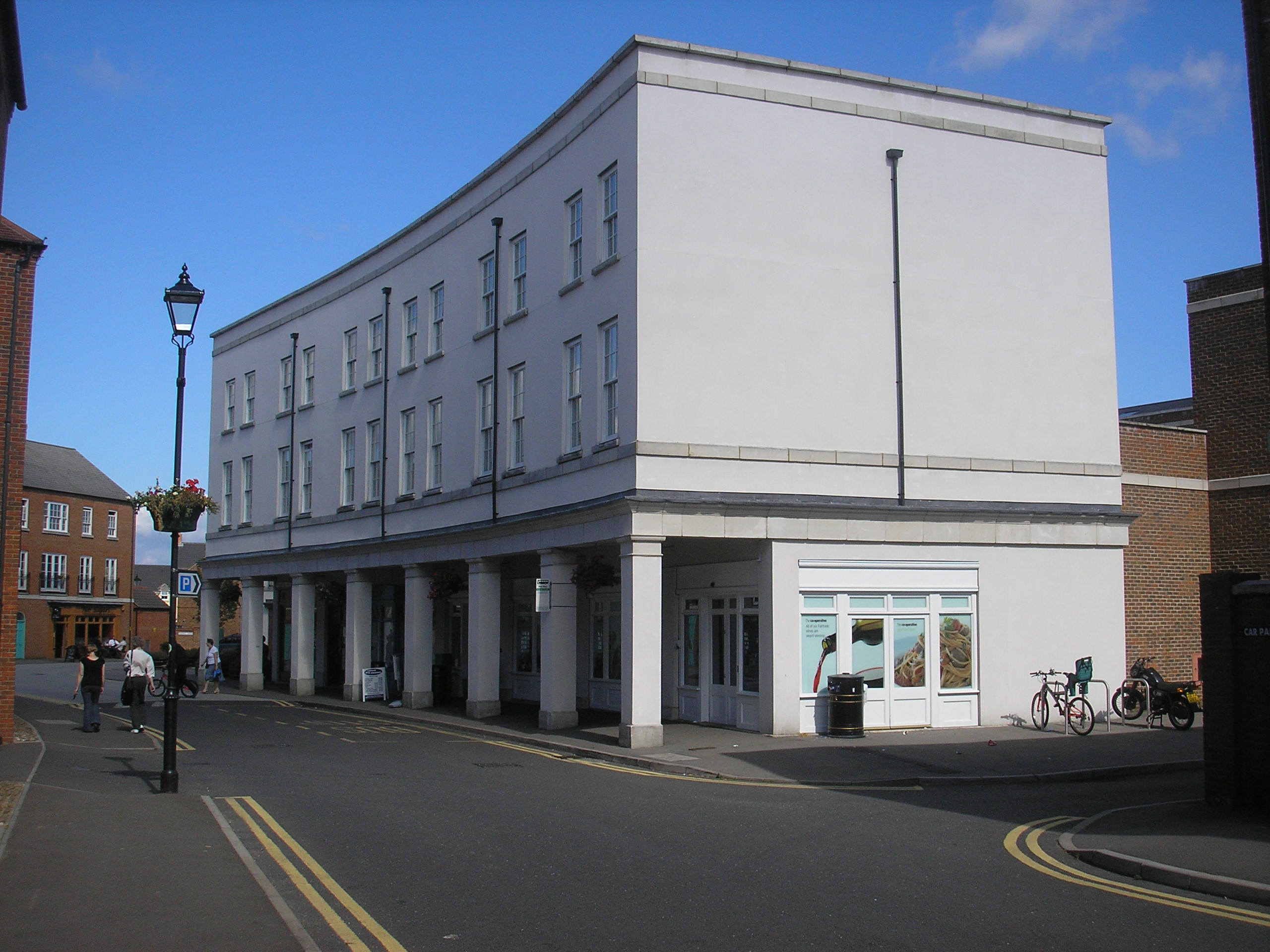
- Fairford Leys Centre.

- Location within Buckinghamshire
- Population: 4,858 (2011 Census)(Coldharbour Parish)
- OS grid reference: SP7913
- Civil parish: Coldharbour
- Unitary authority: Buckinghamshire
- Ceremonial county: Buckinghamshire
- Region: South East
- Country: England
- Sovereign state: United Kingdom
- Post town: Aylesbury
- Postcode district: HP19
- Dialling code: 01296
- Police: Thames Valley
- Fire: Buckinghamshire
- Ambulance: South Central
- UK Parliament: Aylesbury

Fairford Leys is a housing development in Aylesbury, Buckinghamshire, England, designed in the urban village style, with the street and block layout making it more friendly to pedestrians and cyclists. The three main developers of the development were bound by a design code to ensure architectural cohesion and this is maintained through covenants on the deeds of each property.

== Concept ==
Fairford Leys is a mixed-use development consisting of 1,900 homes, on the western edge of Aylesbury. It has a village square hosting a number of traditionally-fronted shops, award-winning hair salon, supermarket, three restaurants, a Post Office, a family-run nursery, an ecumenical church and a community centre. It also has a private health club with swimming pool which opened in October 2003. Fairford Leys belongs to the Coldharbour civil parish in the Aylesbury Vale district. The northern part is home to a modern industrial area.

Fairford Leys is a mixed use development that follows the principles of an urban village, a town planning concept that originated in the UK in the late 1990s and was influenced by new urbanism and garden city ideals. The concept aims to create walkable, cyclable and liveable communities that foster social interaction and a sense of place. Fairford Leys was one of the first examples of a development to use a Design Code, a set of design guidelines that regulate the appearance and quality of the buildings and spaces within the development. The code was championed by John Prescott and the Labour government at the time, who wanted to promote urban village development as an alternative to urban sprawl. The design code set out rules during and after the construction phase, to ensure the individual developers all built to the same design details and created cohesion to the appearance of the development as a whole. The Ernest Cook Trust, a charitable organisation that owned the land where Fairford Leys was built, was the driving force behind this project and wanted to create a model for sustainable development.

The architecture reflects traditional Aylesbury housing styles and incorporates Victorian elements such as lamp posts and railings. The centre of Fairford Leys is enclosed by a "city wall", which consists of three- and four-storey townhouses that form a continuous facade along the streets. The main entrance to the centre is marked by two towers that resemble medieval gate towers. This design feature was inspired by medieval city walls such as those in York, and was suggested by John Simpson, the master planner for Fairford Leys.

Developments in Fairford Leys are controlled by the 16-page guidelines, which are a summary of some of the important aspects of the original Design Code. They govern the look and materials used in several aspects of construction, including roof materials, chimneys, window materials, front boundary fences and planting, and front door colours.

The centre contains a higher density of council housing, with larger detached properties at the edge of the estate. The design also included play areas, open spaces, playing fields and a golf course. The golf course has since been closed and fenced off due to the construction of HS2 through the area.

== Facilities ==
Fairford Leys has its own parish council (Coldharbour Parish), a beauty salon, primary school, GPs' practice and neighbouring pharmacy, veterinary practice, Women's Institute, ecumenical church, and a community centre (known as the Fairford Leys Centre), which hosts a wide variety of events and activities, including dance classes, badminton, karate, children's parties, wedding receptions, corporate functions and council meetings. The main centre was officially opened in November 2004.

== Education ==
St Mary's Church of England School is a mixed, voluntary controlled, primary school, which has about 320 pupils from the ages of four to 11. It was purpose-built for Fairford Leys but the education authority at the time, Buckinghamshire County Council, underestimated the number of children that would live within the catchment area. Consequently, there are often a number of children living within Fairford Leys who cannot get a place.

== Transport ==
Fairford Leys is served by a bus operated by Red Rose. It commenced in 2004 and runs from Fairford Leys to Aylesbury Town Centre via Prebendal Farm and Aylesbury College, designed to run at times to suit commuter travel from Aylesbury Station to London.

== See also ==
- Poundbury
