= Worfield =

Village in Shropshire, England

Coordinates: 52.558°N 2.357°W

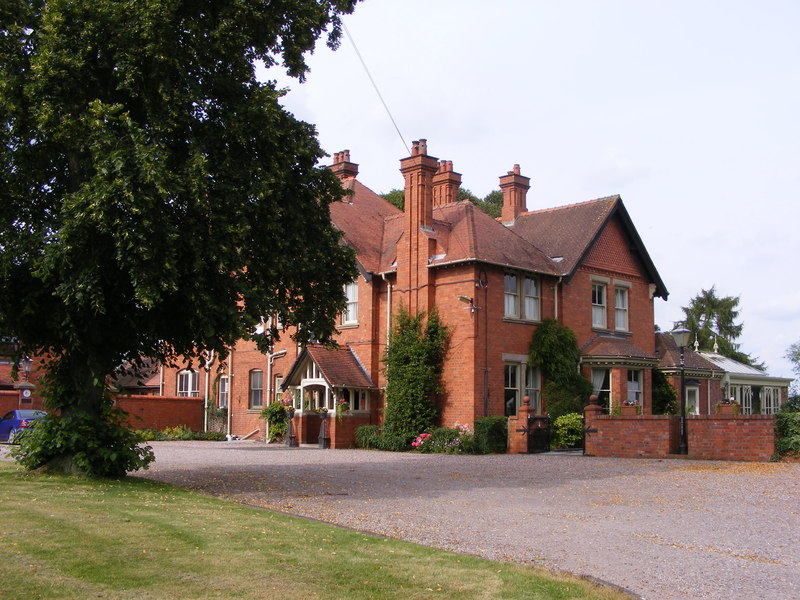
- Old Vicarage Hotel, Worfield

- Location within Shropshire
- Population: 2,225 (2021)
- OS grid reference: SO758956
- Civil parish: Worfield
- Unitary authority: Shropshire
- Ceremonial county: Shropshire
- Region: West Midlands
- Country: England
- Sovereign state: United Kingdom
- Post town: Bridgnorth
- Postcode district: WV15
- Dialling code: 01746
- Police: West Mercia
- Fire: Shropshire
- Ambulance: West Midlands
- UK Parliament: South Shropshire
- Website: Parish Council

Worfield is a village and civil parish in Shropshire in the West Midlands, England. It is 120 miles (190 km) northwest of London and 10 miles (16 km) west of Wolverhampton. It is north of Bridgnorth and southeast of Telford. The parish, which includes the hamlets of Ackleton, Barnsley, Burcote, Chesterton, Hilton and Wyken, is an extensive one that lies on the River Worfe. The population of the parish at the 2021 census was 2,225.

== History ==
The earliest evidence of settlement recorded in the parish is not in Worfield itself but at Chesterton, a hamlet to the east of the village. The people living in the parish between 600 BC and 47 AD were part of the Celtic tribe, Cornovii. The economy of the parish started with the Cornovii tribe and was based on agriculture, breeding, and trading cattle. The area also gained considerable wealth from controlling the South Cheshire salt-making industry.

The manor of Worfield is mentioned in the Domesday Book, where it formed part of the Seisdon Hundred of Staffordshire and was held by Hugh of Montgomery, 2nd Earl of Shrewsbury.

== Literary connections ==
Stableford, within the parish, was home (at Hay's House) to the parents of novelist P.G. Wodehouse (1881–1975) after previously living in Dulwich, south London. Wodehouse returned there during holidays from boarding school between the ages of 14 and 21, before the family relocated to Cheltenham. He came to know the area quite well, and it became one of the major sources for composite settings (with places from other counties) for his novels; he is thought to have based the fictional villages of "Worbury" on Worfield and "Eckleton" on Ackleton, another hamlet of the parish.

Russian-born novelist, biographer and children's author E.M. Almedingen (1898-1971) initially settled in Shropshire at Worfield after arriving in England in 1923, before moving to Church Stretton prior to World War II.

== Schools ==
Worfield is home to the Worfield Endowed CE Primary School, established in 1846. Situated on the main high street leading to St. Peter's Church, the school benefits from the scenic surroundings, with the River Worfe running through its grounds. As a Church of England school, it emphasizes a Christian-based education.

The nearest secondary school is Bridgnorth Endowed School, approximately five miles away from the centre of Worfield.

== St Peter's Church ==
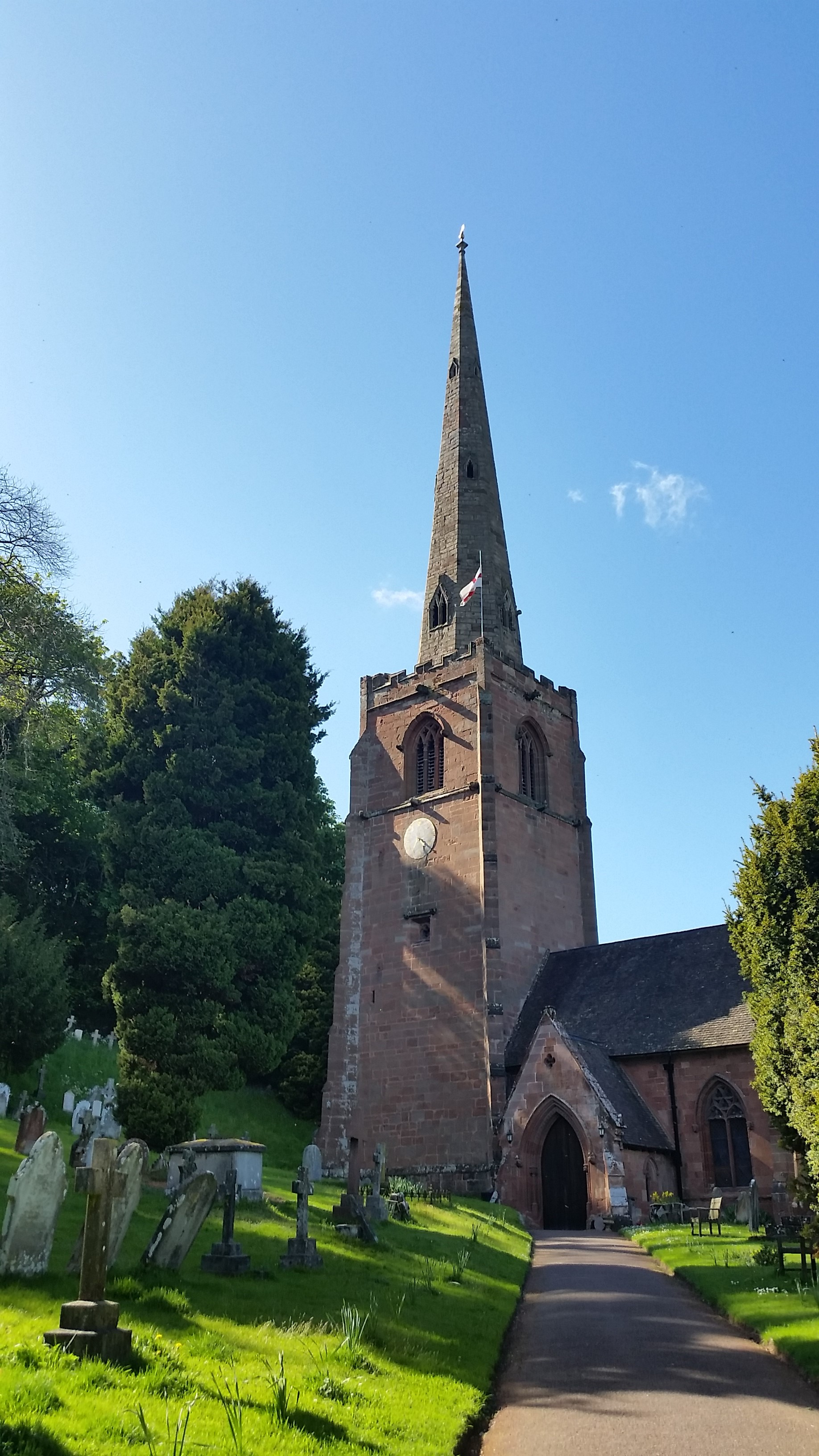
Church of St Peter the Apostle, pictured from the church gate, to the south.

St. Peter's church is thought to be of Saxon origin and founded by Mercian Earl, Leofric, certainly existing since the 12th Century.

The church is perhaps best known for its fine spire, which at one stage was seriously deteriorating along with the six church bells in the tower that were deemed too dangerous to ring. A huge amount of fundraising took place to restore the spire and bells to their present-day condition.

Although there have been changes to the church over the centuries, some of its original features still remain. The original wooden doors leading into the church date back to the 12th Century. These doors are historically important as they are the earliest evidence of the use of ironwork for decoration. The doors in St Peter's Church are one of the only five picture doors left in England.

The most prominent features of the interior are the Bromley tombs. The earlier was built for George Bromley, a prominent judge of the Elizabethan period and brother of Thomas Bromley, the Lord Chancellor. He acquired property through marriage to Joan Waverton, heiress to the Hallon estate, to the west of Worfield. The later and more impressive tomb was built for their second son, Edward Bromley, another important judge who was appointed a Baron of the Exchequer and is portrayed in judicial dress.

There are a variety of war memorials inside the church:

- Shield-shaped metal and wood plaque to a man who died of fever serving in the 1885 Egyptian campaign and two men who died in the Boer War.
- Brass tablet to four Old Boys of the former Worfield Grammar School killed in the Boer War, incorporating an image of a chalice to represent one the school additionally donated to the church.
- Wall tablet to Second Lieutenant Eden Marindin, KSLI, died of wounds in World War I.
- Brass wall tablet to Major Frank Harvey Corbett, Royal Field Artillery, killed in World War I, with his battlefield grave marker cross removed from his burial place in France.
- Stone plaque with a marble surround to men of the parish who died serving in World War I.
- Stone plaque to those who died in World War II.

The old churchyard contains the war graves of three soldiers of World War I and the attached church cemetery those of two soldiers and an army officer of World War II. The World War II general, Sir Oliver Leese (1894–1978), whose home was at Lower Hall in the village from his marriage in 1930 until 1973, is buried in the churchyard.

St Peter's church

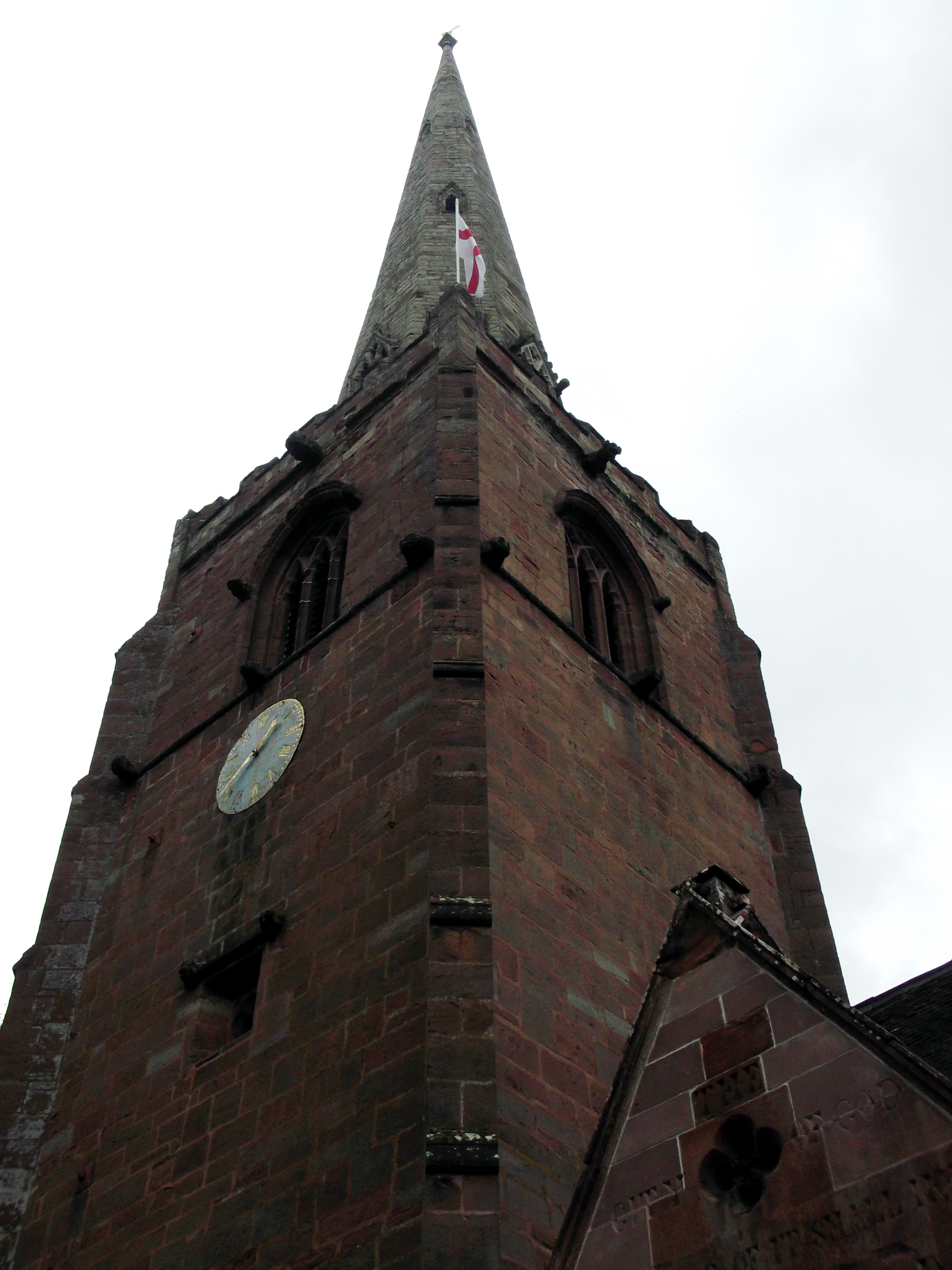
Spire pictured from immediately below to the southeast.

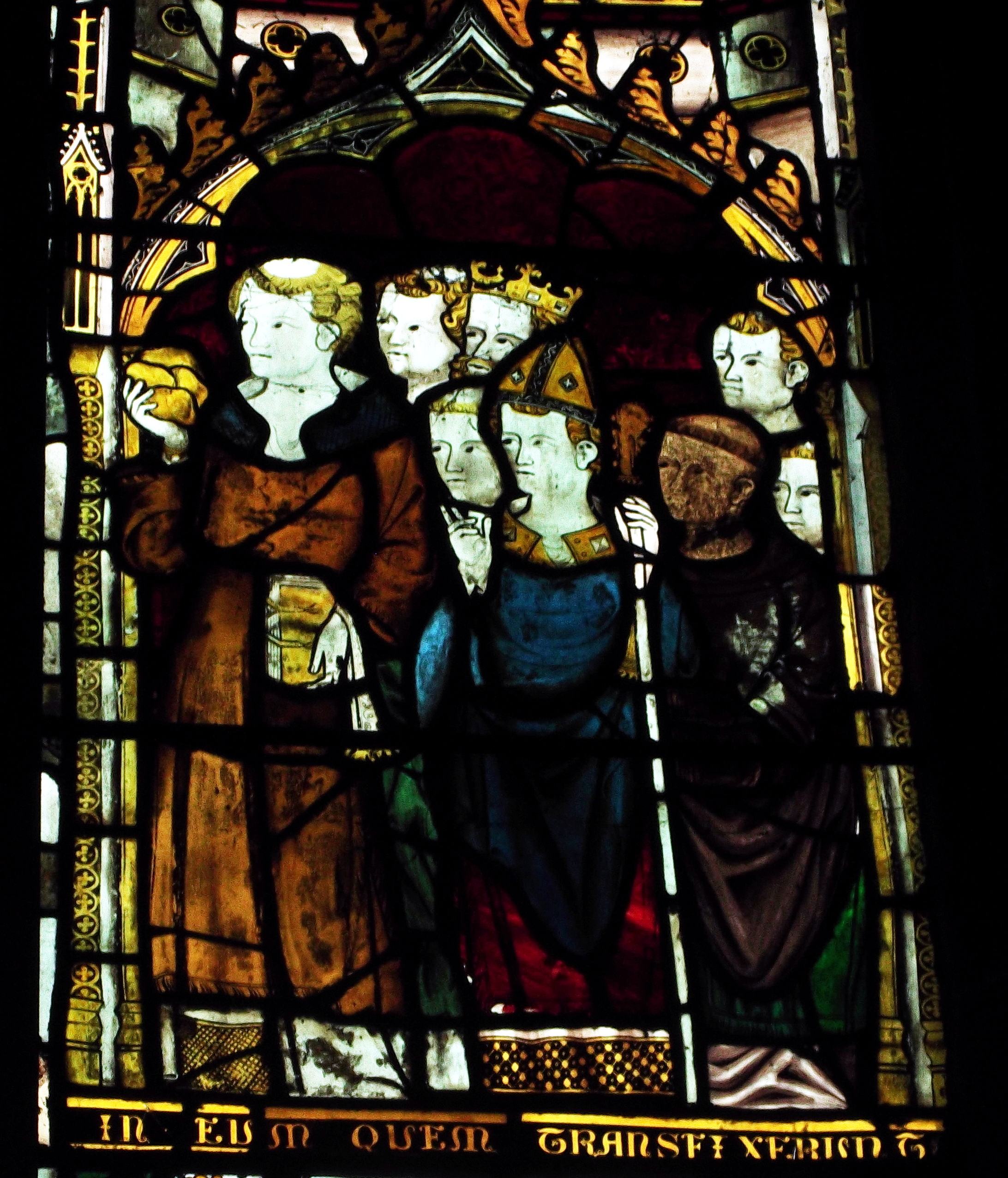
Medieval glass in St Nicholas's chapel.

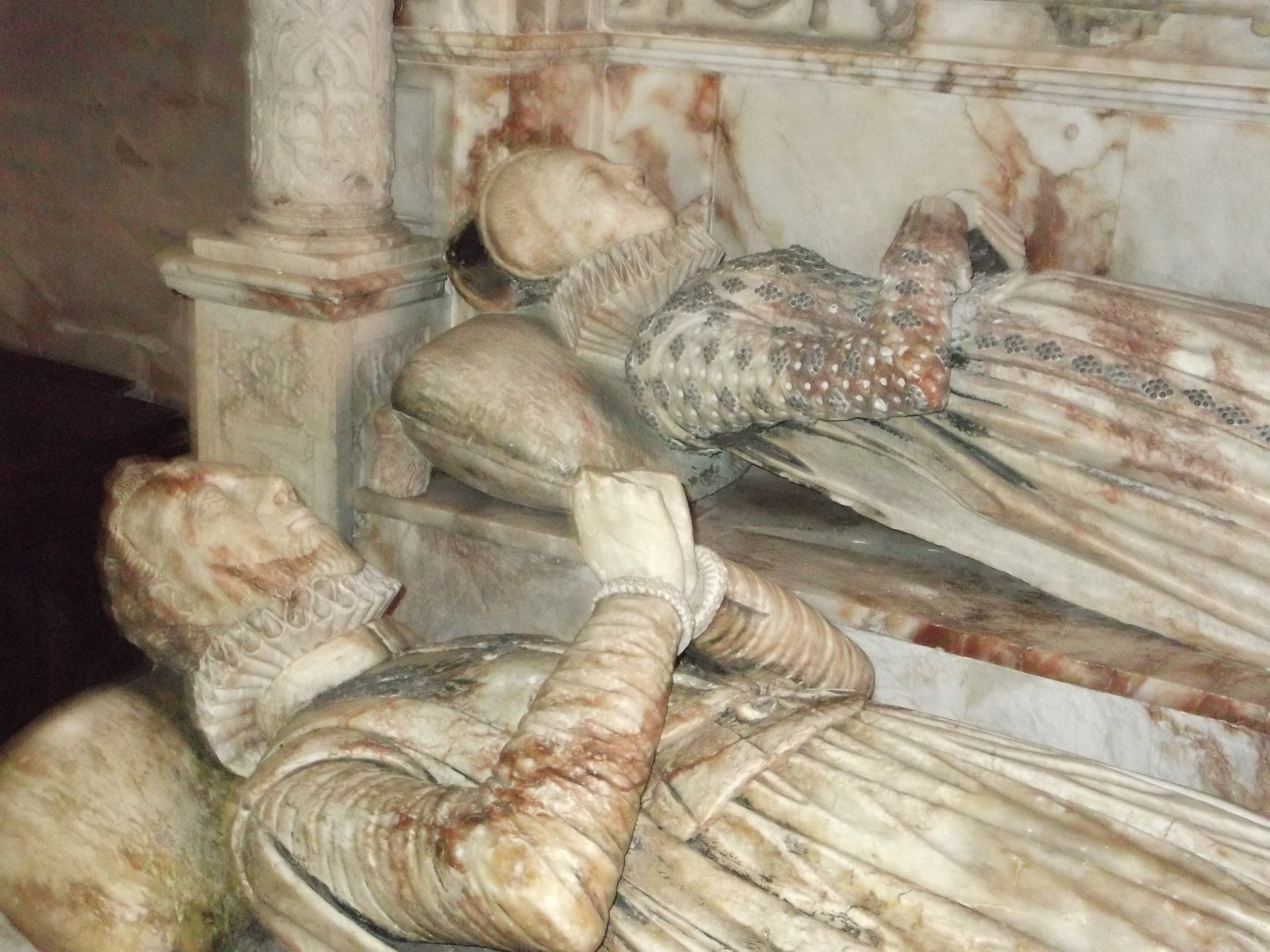
Effigies of George Bromley, a notable judge of the Tudor period, and Joan Waverton of Hallon, his wife.

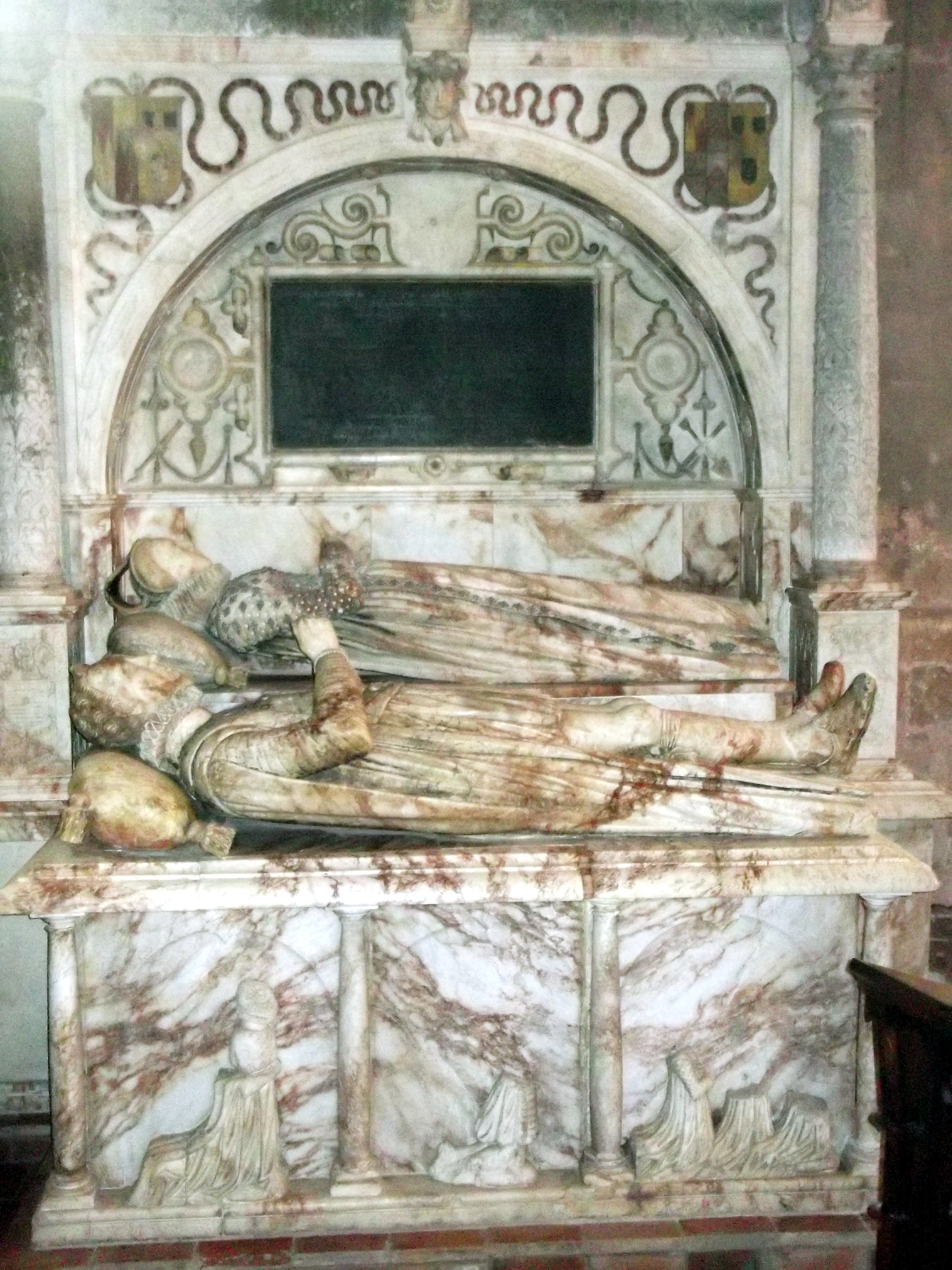
Tomb of George Bromley and Joan Waverton.

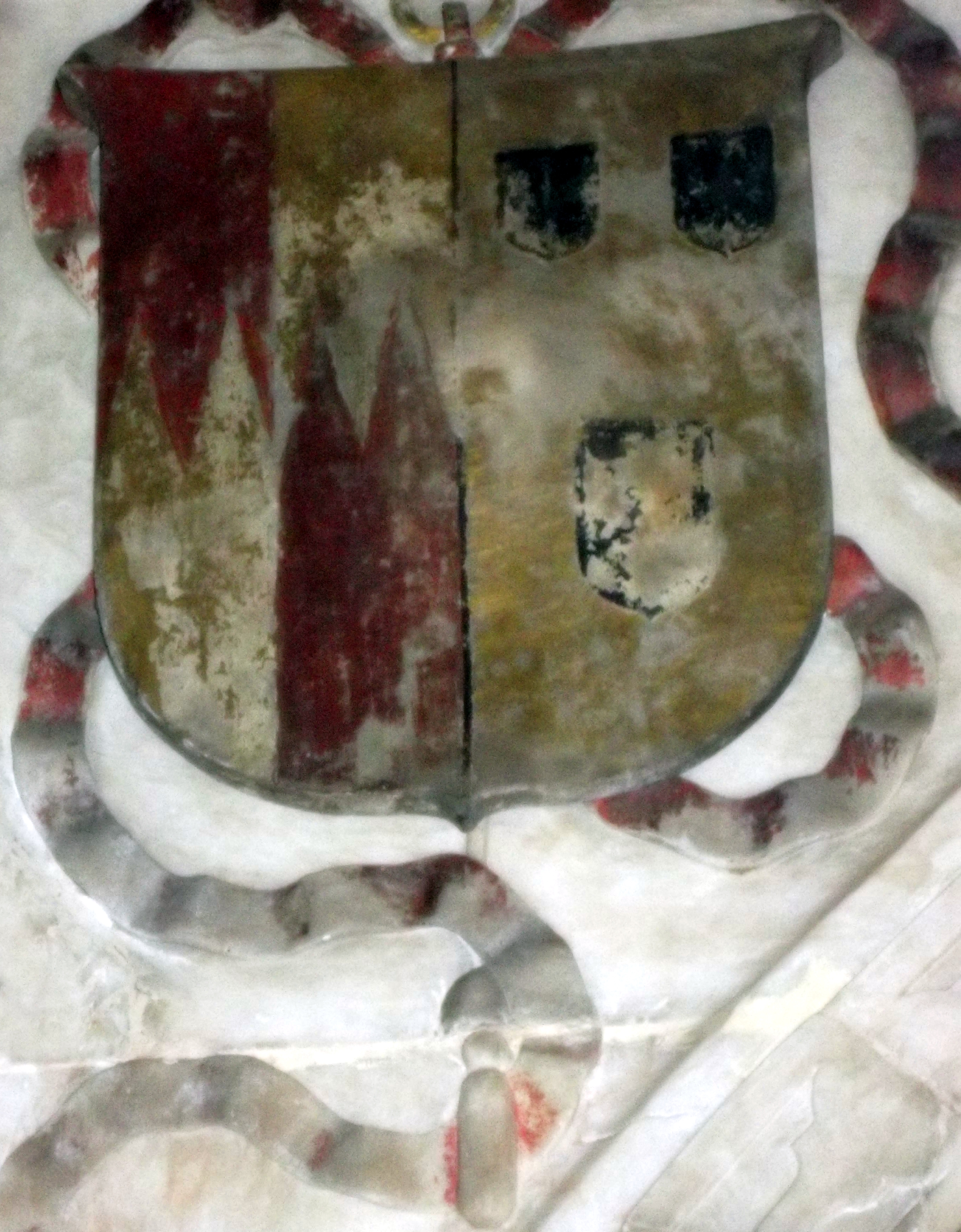
Arms of George Bromley, depicted on his tomb.

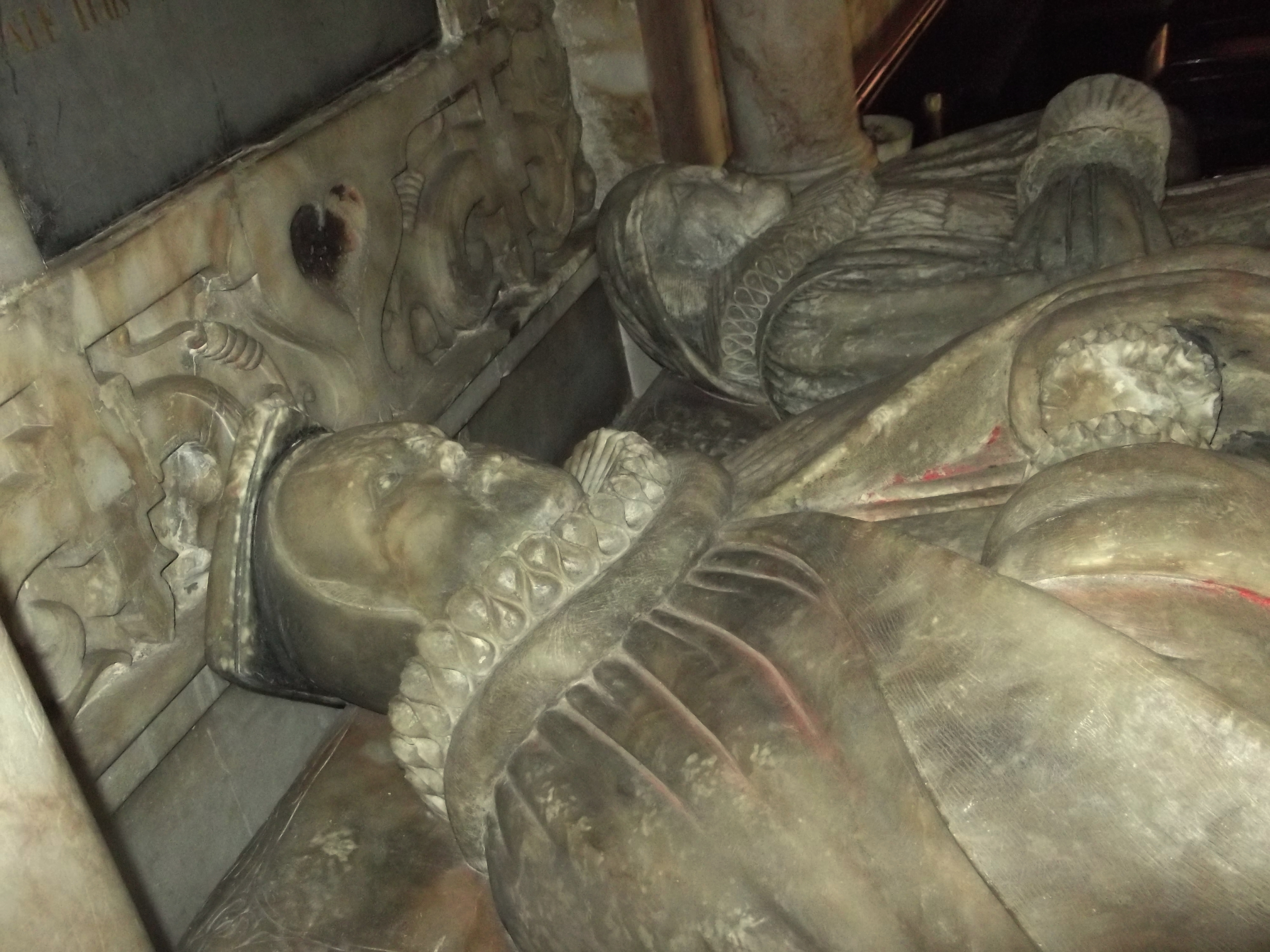
Effigies of Edward Bromley, a judge of the 16th and 17th centuries, and Margaret Lowe, his wife.

== Climate ==
The nearest weather station is at Wyken, just 1 kilometre (0.62 mi) away from Worfield. The climate in Worfield is characterized by seasonal variations, with average highest temperatures ranging from 7 °C in January to 21 °C in July and August. The average lowest temperatures occur between January and February, reaching 0 °C.

The precipitation pattern follows a similar trend, with the wettest months being between October and March. The average annual precipitation is relatively consistent, providing a temperate climate suitable for year-round activities.

== Governance ==
The first tier of local government is Worfield and Rudge Parish Council, which also covers the smaller parish of Rudge, to the east of Worfield. Most functions of local government are carried out by Shropshire Council, a unitary authority. The Worfield electoral division, which extends to several parishes north of Worfield, elects one member of Shropshire Council.

== Places of interest ==
=== Davenport House ===
Davenport House is a Grade I listed building built around 1727. It was built by the architect Francis Smith of Warwick for Henry Davenport. It is now used for events such as weddings, conferences, and private parties. It is located southwest of Worfield.

=== Golf club ===
Worfield Golf Club has a modern 18-hole course. The course opened in 1991 and has been continuously developed since then. The course allows play all year round, and trolleys or buggies can be used most of the year. The club co-hosted the English Men's Senior Championship in 1999.

=== Historic hotels ===
The Old Vicarage Hotel has 14 bedrooms, and the restaurant at the Old Vicarage is one of the only two restaurants in Shropshire that have three AA rosettes for dining and three red stars. The Inn at Shipley is located in a three-storey Georgian building from 1771, 3.5 miles away from The Old Vicarage and is part of the Brunning and Price chain.

== Crime rates ==
According to police statistics, Worfield's crime and anti-social behaviour (ASB) rates are classified as average, with 68% of areas having an average crime level compared to the rest of England and Wales. February 2012 recorded the highest crime rate in over a year, with reported incidents including 2 burglaries, 1 anti-social behaviour incident, and 2 other thefts (excluding shoplifting).

== Television and radio ==
Several radio stations, including BBC Radio Shropshire (96FM), Hits Radio Black Country & Shropshire (103.1FM), Kic FM, Sunshine 855 Radio, and WCR FM, either operate from or broadcast to the Worfield area. The local TV news programs for Worfield are BBC Midlands Today and ITV Central News.

Worfield was the main setting for the Channel 5 drama Murder Before Evensong, based on the book of the same name by the Reverend Richard Coles, doubling as the fictional village of Champton.

== See also ==
- Listed buildings in Worfield
