= Ernest Cook Trust =

English educational charity

The Ernest Cook Trust is a large educational charity in England. It was founded in 1952 by the philanthropist Ernest Cook, the grandson of travel pioneer Thomas Cook. Each year the Trustees distribute more than £1.25m in educational grants to benefit children and young people, notably to schools for improving their outdoor education and play areas.

== About ==
Rooted in the conservation and management of the countryside, the Trust also actively encourages children and young people to learn from the land through hands-on educational opportunities on its estates and by offering grants.

== Estates ==
The Trust currently owns and manages 22,000 acres (89 km^{2}) of landed estates across five counties in southern England.

The trust owns 21,500 acres (87 km^{2}) of land and is responsible for the following estates:

- The Fairford Park Estate
- The Barnsley Village Estate
- The Little Dalby Estate
- The Hartwell Estate
- The Slimbridge Estate
- The Trent Estate
- The Filkins Estate
- The Hatherop Estate

The Trust was also instrumental in the development of the Fairford Leys housing development on land it owned in Aylesbury, Buckinghamshire.

According to the Trust annual report in March 2024 the open market value of the trusts properties was £256million pounds. https://find-and-update.company-information.service.gov.uk/company/07907411/filing-history/MzQ0OTg3ODI2MGFkaXF6a2N4/document?format=pdf&download=0
