= River Worfe =

River in Shropshire, England

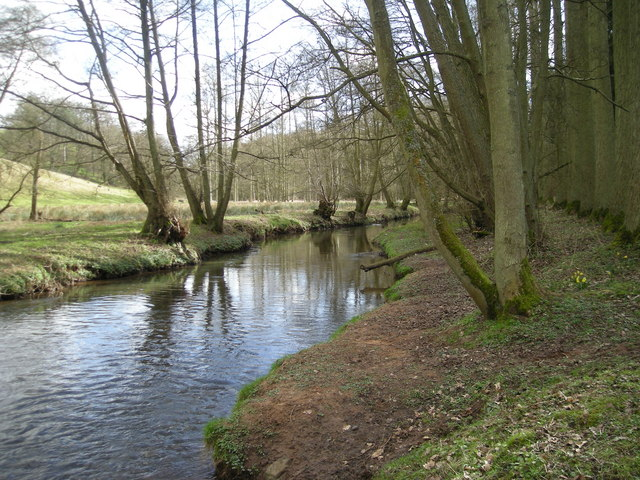
- River Worfe near Rindleford

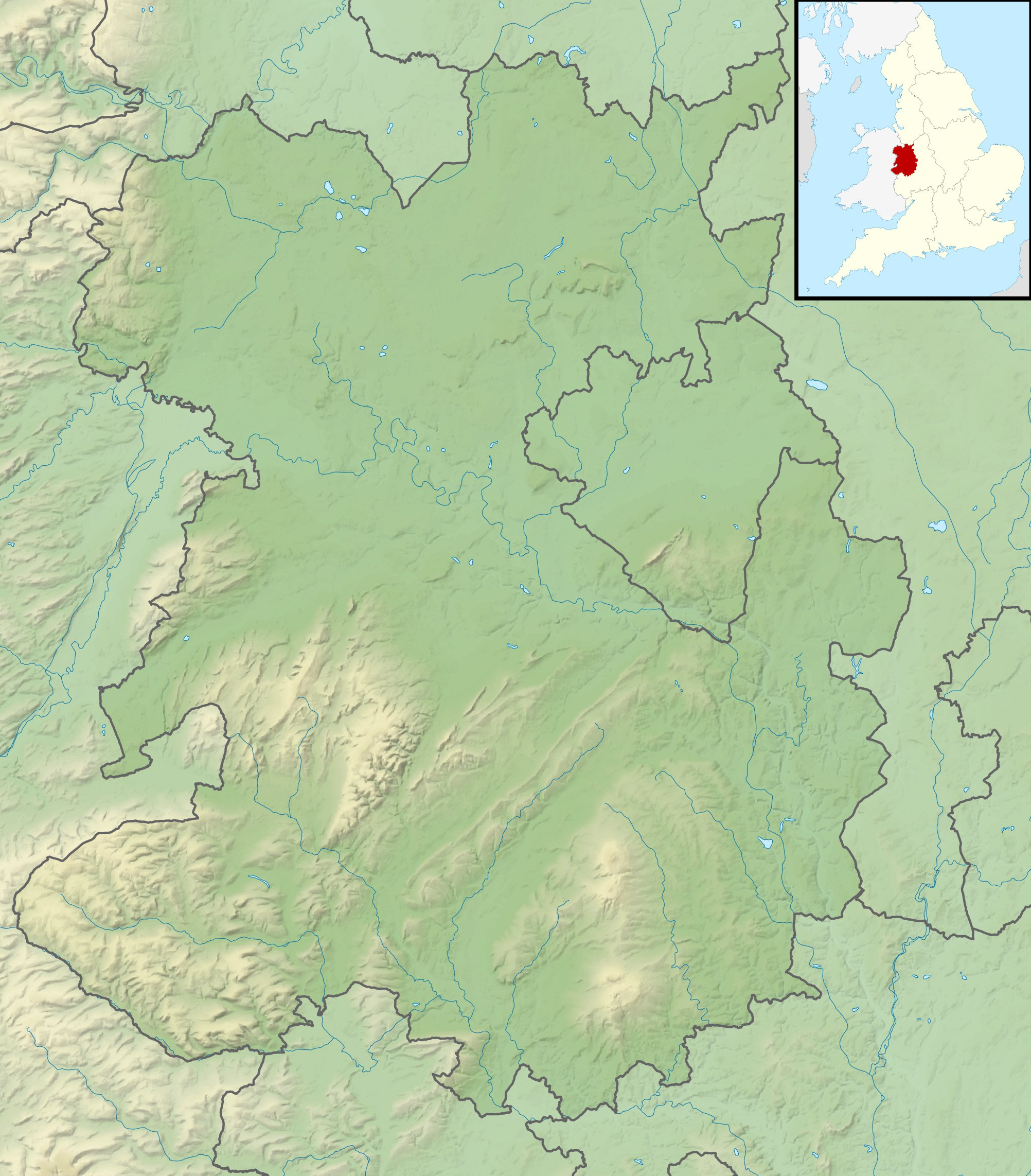
- Location of the mouth in Shropshire

Location
- Country: England
- Counties: Shropshire

Physical characteristics
- Mouth
  - location: River Severn
  - coordinates: 52.5536°N 2.4074°W
- Length: 28.6 km (17.8 mi)
- Basin size: 258 km^{2} (100 sq mi)
- Discharge
  - location: Burford

Basin features
- Tributaries
  - left: Neachley Brook (Morning Brook), Albrighton Brook, Badger Dingle, Stratford Brook (6)
  - right: Wesley Brook (2), Mad Brook

The River Worfe is a river in Shropshire, England. The name Worfe is said to derive from the Old English meaning to wander (or meander) which the river is notable for in its middle section. Mapping indicates that the river begins at Cosford Bridge where the Cosford Brook and Albrighton Brook meet (Cosford Brook, a local name, is itself the confluence of the Ruckley Brook and Neachley Brook).

== Course ==
It rises at Crackleybank on Watling Street, just north of Shifnal. It then forms the boundary of that parish with Tong, Donington, and Albrighton. It then passes through Ryton (where it is joined by Wesley Brook), and Beckbury. There it is joined by Mad Brook, which takes its name from Madeley through where it first flows. Soon after, it forms the boundary between Stockton and Badger, before flowing through Worfield to join the River Severn. The river flows downhill to the Severn at an average rate of 10 feet per mile so that between the source and its mouth there is a drop of 200 feet (61 m).

The river has two outlets to the River Severn, of which the southern emerging at Fort Pendlestone was formerly the mill leat serving Pendlestone Mill, the ancient corn mill of the town of Bridgnorth and long belonging to Bridgnorth Corporation.

Due to the low flow problems affecting the river in its upper reaches, a pipeline was constructed in 1998 between a borehole at Sheriffhales and Ruckley Brook north of the A5.

The Severn Rivers Trust carried out remedial works to the river and its banks in March 2015. Six community groups and 27 volunteers installed 5 miles (8 km) of fencing, installed numerous eel and fish passes and created 4.6 miles (7.4 km) of new channelling in an effort to improve the river's ecological status.

== Sources ==
The river is fed by many smaller brooks within Shropshire; Ruckley, Wesley, Mad, Neachley, Albrighton, and Stratford Brooks, along with one other beck known as Badger Dingle. During the course of these headwaters flowing into the Worfe, they go through various names: Neachley has a Morning Brook flowing into it, Wesley Brook is composed of the River Sal and Hem Brook and Stratford Brook starts out as Pebble Brook before flowing into Patshull Great Pool and becoming first Pasford Brook, then Nun Brook, and finally Stratford Brook. Near where the Stratford Brook joins the Worfe it is also joined by a smaller watercourse which has the names of Cut Throat Brook, Claverley Brook and then Hilton Brook. Cut Throat Brook is so named after the area if flows through, but it is unknown as to how the area got its name.

Mad Brook (also known as Madebrook) rises in Telford Town Park and has until 2014, been largely culverted and polluted. This was remedied in a clean up campaign by the Shropshire Wildlife Trust, to return the covered sections to daylight and stop pollutants and run-off from poisoning the waters.
