= Fairford Park =

Estate in Gloucestershire, England

Coordinates: 51.7124°N 1.7799°W

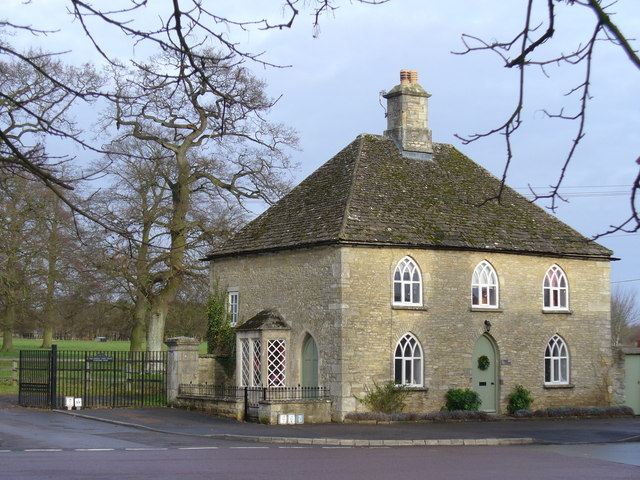
South Lodge, at the entrance to Fairford Park

Fairford Park is a 4,200-acre (1,700 ha) estate in the southern Cotswolds in Gloucestershire, England, close to the small town of Fairford.

Purchased by philanthropist Ernest Cook from the Barker family in 1945, the former stables and coach house of Fairford Park House are used as the headquarters of the Ernest Cook Trust, which now owns the estate. At the time of its sale, the estate occupied about 2,500 acres (1,000 ha), but it has since been added to by the purchase of surrounding farms: Court Farm in 1966, Hooks Farm at Southrop Airfield in 1967, Homeleaze Farm in 1975, and Donkeywell Farm in 1982.

The estate comprises five let farms, mainly arable with some grazing along the valley of the River Coln, and about 260 acres (110 ha) of woodland. During the Second World War, the 17th-century Fairford Park House was used as an American military hospital, and until 1959 Polish refugees were housed in a camp in the park. The manor house was demolished in the 1950s, and its site is now occupied by Farmor's School.

== History ==
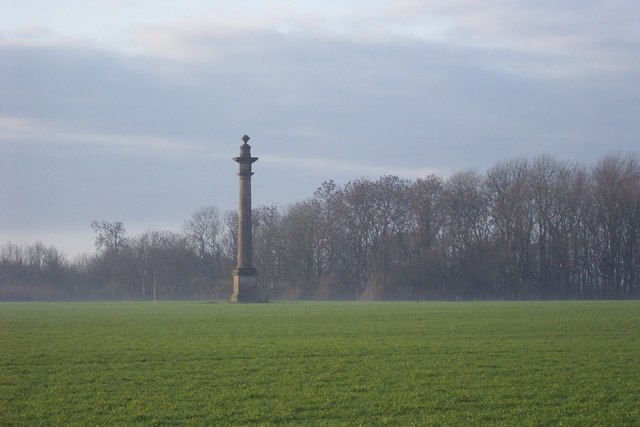
The still-standing obelisk which marked the end of the Park

The manor house was built by Andrew Barker, the son of a Bristol merchant, at the beginning of the 1660s. He acquired the estate from Sir Robert Tracy of Toddington who was forced to sell it to avoid a composition fine.

James Lambe was a resident and developed the park in the 1700s including building gardens, viewing spots and an obelisk to mark the end of the deer park.

Of Lambe and the park, in 1763, Samuel Rudder wrote:

He was a great benefactor of the town. His country seat is situated about two furlongs and a half northwood of the church. The gardens and the wilderness thereunto belonging (containing between twenty and thirty acres of ground) are a curiosity generally connected with this of the church. Opposite the north front of the villa stand four images, representing the four seasons of the year; beyond which is a vista through the deer-park, terminated by an obelisk, nearly a mile distant, between two woods. The wilderness consists of serpentine walks adorn'd with images, urns, grottos, etc. included chiefly between three vistas. From the upper end of the middle one is the most pleasant and delightful view of the canal, (answering thereto) proceeding from the river Coln, which glides its silver streams along the bottom of the wilderness. The whole of the garden and the wilderness is in a modern and elegant taste, well flock'd with fruit-trees, shrubs, flowers etc.
