= Francis Smith of Warwick =

English master-builder and architect

Francis Smith of Warwick (1672–1738) was an English master-builder and architect, much involved in the construction of country houses in the Midland counties of England. Smith of Warwick may refer also to his brothers, or his son.

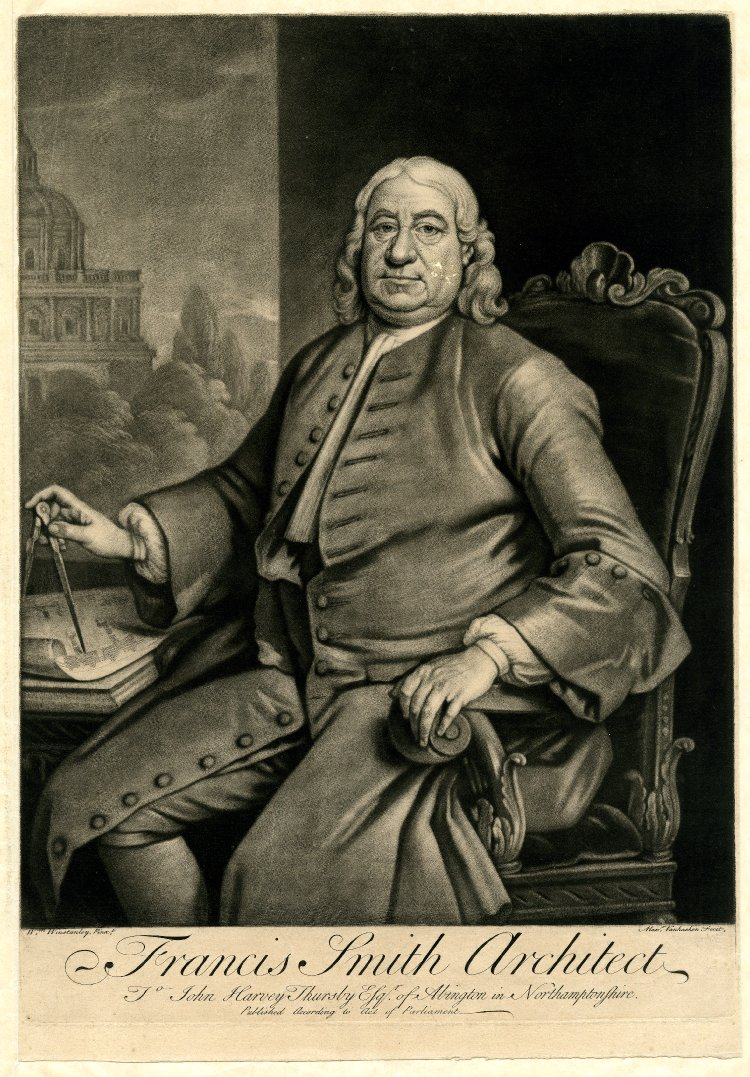
Francis Smith of Warwick.

== Architectural work ==
The county town of Warwick had been devastated by a fire in September 1694, and the projects involved in its rebuilding gave the Smith brothers their first prominence, which they retained for decades by a universal reputation for scrupulous honesty and competence. Howard Colvin, plotting their known commissions on a map, remarked that nearly all of them lay within a fifty-mile radius of their mason's yard, the "Marble House" in Warwick.

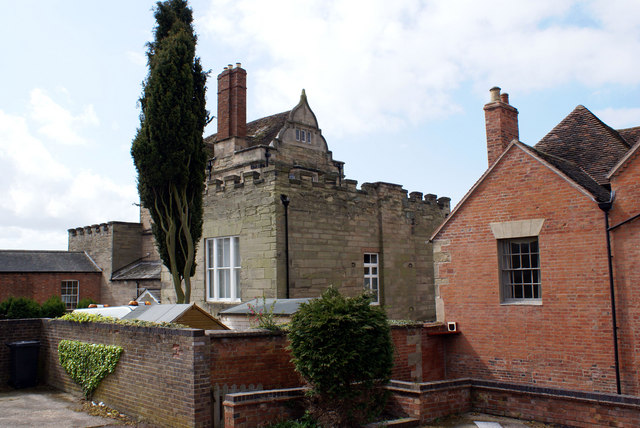
The Marble House, Warwick.

The antiquary Daines Barrington noted in 1784, after viewing several Smith of Warwick houses, found "all of them convenient and handsome" despite changes in taste. Colvin summarised the elements by which a Smith house is easily recognizable: three storeys, with the central three bays emphasized by a slight projection or recession; uniform fenestration with exterior detail confined to keystones, architraves, quoins and a balustraded parapet, which was the most significant modernisation of a formula derived in essence from the late seventeenth-century model typified by Belton House. In the plans there was invariably a hall backed by a saloon in the centre, with a staircase set to one side. In spite of some splendid effects achieved by plasterwork and joinery, Colvin noted that "the spatial effects are simple and unenterprising".

Four exceptional houses did not conform to these conventions. They were Kedleston (demolished and replaced by the celebrated Robert Adam house); Chicheley Hall with William Kent, doubtless in part the design of its owner Sir John Chester, and his virtuosi friends; Stoneleigh Abbey, "a somewhat inept attempt to use a giant order in the grand baroque manner" (Colvin) and Sutton Scarsdale (stripped of its interiors in the 1920s), where Colvin, comparing its assurance with Stoneleigh's "gauche" crowded windows and "leggy pilasters", suspected some intervention by James Gibbs.

Andor Gomme has identified several churches which had Francis Smith’s architectural input, of which four survive in use with Smith’s contribution reasonably intact; namely All Saints, Gainsborough, Lincs. (all except tower), St Nicholas Alcester, Warks. (nave), All Saints, Lamport, Northants. (chancel) and St Botolph's, Sibson, Leics. The first two, with their Corinthian and Doric columns respectively and plastered ceilings, display Smith’s adoption of the Palladian style, as influenced by Gibbs.

== Family ==
William Smith of Warwick (1661–1724), master builder trained as a bricklayer, was brother to Francis Smith: the brothers, who often worked in partnership and with the third brother Richard, were sons of a bricklayer and master builder, Francis Smith, of The Wergs, near Tettenhall, Staffordshire. By the time of William's death in 1724 they had become the most prominent designers and builders of houses in the Midlands.

Francis joined his brother William in the reconstruction of St Mary's Church, Warwick, but later oversaw the project of the new courthouse. Francis served on the Town Corporation in the 1720s and was the head of maintenance during the 1730s until he died in 1738.

William Smith of Warwick (1705–1747) was the next generation in the firm, son of Francis. The business passed to William and David Hiorn.

== Craftsmen ==
He was a major employer, and some of his craftsmen were individually credited on a lead plaque formerly at Sutton Scarsdale:

- Thomas Eborall, joiner
- Joshua Needham, plasterer
- Edward Poynton of Nottingham, stone carver
- John Wilkes, door furniture

Another craftsman and architect who worked under Smith was William Baker of Audlem, who was employed as a carpenter by Smith at Ditchley in Oxfordshire in 1727, and later developed an extensive architectural practice in Shropshire and Staffordshire A further architect and builder associated with the Smiths was Abraham Hayward, who came from Whitchurch, where Smith had built St Alkmund's Church. The Smiths employed Hayward on the re-building of St Peter at Arches Church, Lincoln, where Hayward was to stay and work as an architect.

== Buildings (designed or worked on) ==
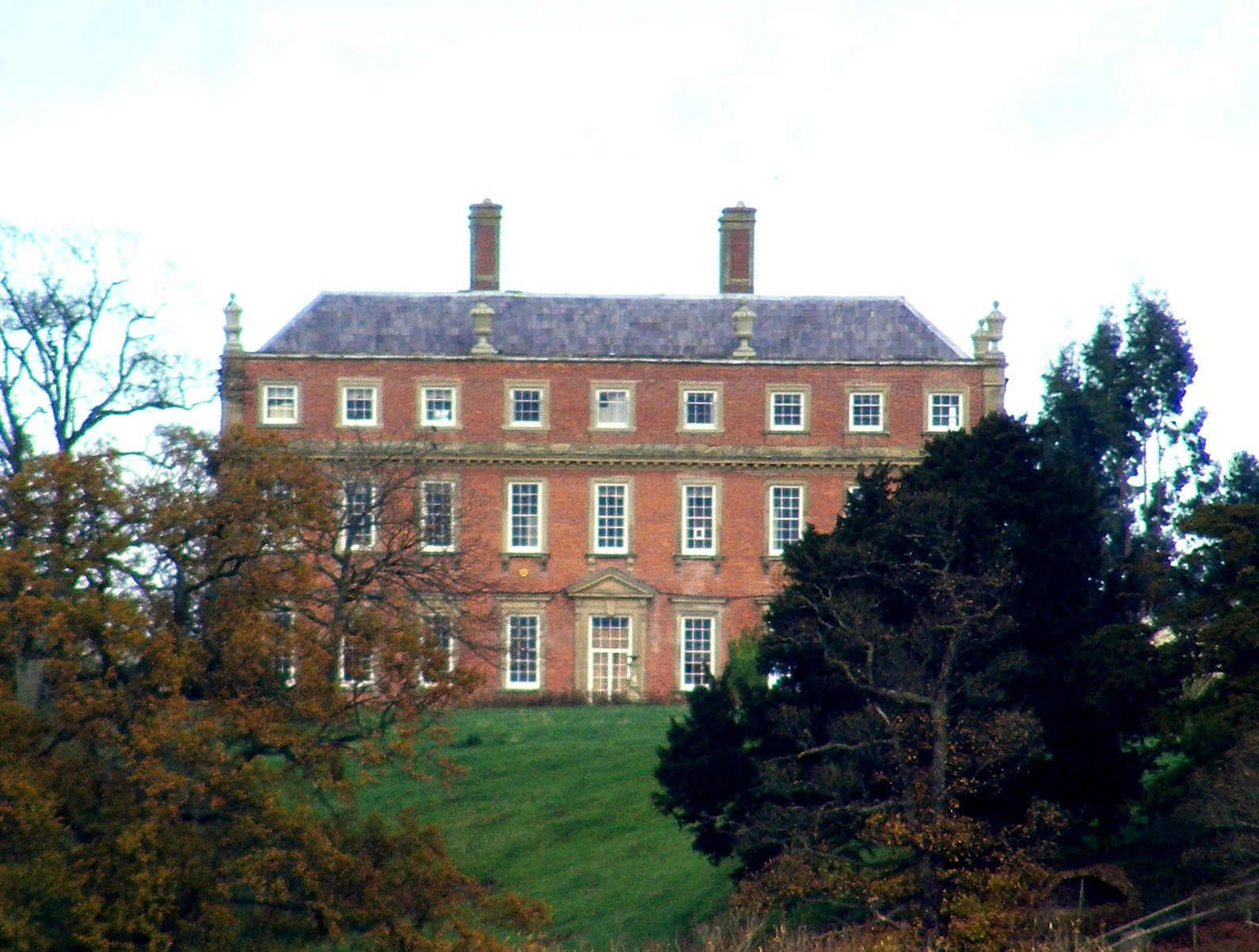
Davenport House, 2010

- Acton Round Hall
- All Saints Church, Gainsborough, Lincolnshire
- Church of All Saints, Lamport, Northamptonshire
- Aston Hall, Birmingham 1735, attributed
- Buntingsdale Hall, Shropshire c.1721, attributed to John Prince and Smith
- Calke Abbey, Derbyshire 1727 with James Gibbs
- Chicheley Hall with William Kent, 1719–1723
- Chillington Hall, Staffordshire
- Cottesbrooke Hall, attributed
- Davenport House, Worfield, Shropshire c. 1727
- Derby Cathedral, with James Gibbs, 1723–1725
- Ditchley Park, Oxfordshire
- Dudmaston Hall, 1695–1701
- Fawsley Hall, Northamptonshire
- Hereford Cathedral
- Heythrop Hall, 1707–1713
- Kelmarsh Hall with James Gibbs, 1732
- Kemerton Court, attributed
- Kirtlington House
- Lamport Hall c.1732
- Leeswood Hall, Leeswood, Flintshire

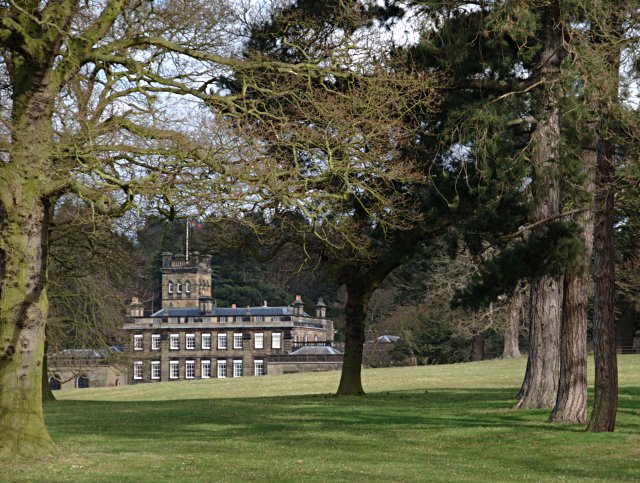
Locko Park, Derbyshire.

- Locko Park, Derbyshire 1725–1730
- Mason Croft, Stratford upon Avon, Warwickshire.
- Mawley Hall, Shropshire 1730
- Melbourne Hall, Derbyshire
- Ombersley Court, Worcestershire
- Preston-on-the-Weald Moors Hospital, Shropshire, 1720–1726, attributed
- Shardeloes
- St Alkmund's Church, Whitchurch, Shropshire
- St Botolph's Church, Sibson, Leicestershire
- St Mary’s Priory Church, Monmouth, 1732
- St Modwen's Church, Burton upon Trent
- St Nicholas Church, Alcester, Warks, 1729
- St Peter at Arches Church, Lincoln c1720-24
- Stanford Hall, Leicestershire
- Stanwick Hall, Northamptonshire
- Stoneleigh Abbey, Warwickshire 1714–1728
- Sutton Scarsdale House, Derbyshire
- Umberslade Hall, 1695–1700
- Warwick Court House
