= Great Addington =

Village in Northamptonshire, England

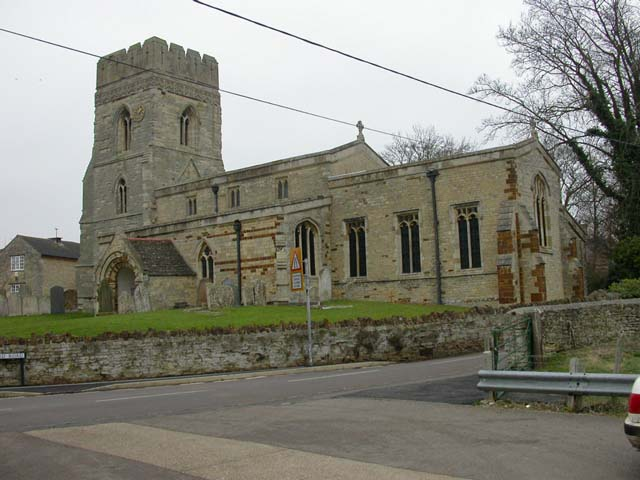
- All Saints Church, Great Addington

- Location within Northamptonshire
- Population: 327 (2011 census)
- OS grid reference: SP9574
- Unitary authority: North Northamptonshire
- Ceremonial county: Northamptonshire
- Region: East Midlands
- Country: England
- Sovereign state: United Kingdom
- Post town: Kettering
- Postcode district: NN14
- Dialling code: 01536
- Police: Northamptonshire
- Fire: Northamptonshire
- Ambulance: East Midlands
- UK Parliament: Corby and East Northamptonshire

Great Addington is a small village and civil parish in Northamptonshire, England. It lies near the west bank of the River Nene, about 5 miles (8 km) east of Kettering. It consists of approximately 100 households; at the time of the 2011 census, the population of the parish (including Slipton) was 327 people. It has a school, church, manor house, village hall, a pub called the Hare & Hounds, playing fields and homes. There is a strong bond and rivalry with the neighbouring village Little Addington.

The villages name means 'Farm/settlement connected with Eadda/Aeddi'.

There is evidence of Celtic, Romano-British and Anglo-Saxon settlement within the village boundary.

A detailed history of the village from the Iron-Age to the modern day - including information about many of the buildings and people of the village - can be found at A History of Great Addington (greataddingtonhistory.uk)

== Heritage assets ==
The following buildings and structures are listed by Historic England as of special architectural or historic interest.

- Church of All Saints (Grade II*) 12th century 52.36570°N 0.59355°W
- Manor House (Grade II) 17th century 52.36516°N 0.59422°W
- Great Addington House (Grade II) 17th century 52.36628°N 0.59393°W
- Gates and Gatepiers, Great Addington House (Grade II) 18th century 52.36484°N 0.59383°W
- Wall near Manor House (Grade II) 18th century 52.36551°N 0.59468°W
- Manor Farmhouse (Grade II) 18th century 52.36407°N 0.59205°W
- Carlers Farmhouse and Outbuilding (Grade II) 18th century 52.36502°N 0.59296°W
- Hare and Hounds Public House (Grade II) 18th century 52.36442°N 0.59251°W
- Ferndale (Grade II) 19th century 52.36459°N 0.59263°W

The parish covers nearly 500 hectares of land extending in a broad strip westwards from the R. Nene, on generally rising ground between 120 ft. and 300 ft. above OD. The higher W. part of the parish is on Boulder Clay but near the Nene the down-cutting of the river and two small tributary streams have exposed the underlying Jurassic limestones, clays and sands on the steep valley side.

Prehistoric and Roman

c (1) Iron Age settlement (SP 946741), S.W. of the village on Boulder Clay at 275 ft. above OD. An area of dark soil containing pebbles and Iron Age B pottery, has been found (BNFAS, 7 (1972), 4).

b(2) Iron Age settlement (?) (SP 950756), N.W. of the village on Boulder Clay at 225 ft. above OD. An 'Iron Age 'B' occupation with burnt stone areas' is recorded (BNFAS, 7 (1972), 4).

a(3) Roman settlement (SP 947756), in the N.W. of the parish, 260 ft. above OD on land sloping gently E. towards a small stream. The underlying soil is on Boulder Clay. Ploughing has produced quantities of Roman pottery, some of Nene Valley type, together with a scatter of limestone rubble and roofing tiles, perhaps indicating former buildings, over an area of 50 sq. m. Small amounts of pottery are spread over a wider area (BNFAS, 1 (1966), 8).

b(4) Trackway (SP 96297550–96617526; Fig. 13), N.E. of the village, roughly parallel to the 200 ft. contour along the side of a low spur of limestone. It is orientated N.W.-S.E., crosses the Roman road 570 almost at right angles, and is traceable on air photographs as two parallel ditches 25 m. apart for a distance of 400 m. (Air photographs in NMR).

b(5) Enclosures (SP 950754; Fig. 13) lies N.W. of Rectory Farm, on the W. side of a small valley at 225 ft. above OD on Boulder Clay. Air photographs show two small enclosures, bounded by a wide ditch with an entrance in the N.W. side of the larger. Two circular ditched features in the interior may be hut sites. A possible ditched trackway traceable for 50 m. runs from the entrance in a N.W. direction (air photographs in NMR).

For possible Roman burials, see (16).

For Roman Road 570, see p. 117.

Medieval and Later

d (6) Anglo-Saxon Cemetery (SP 95717442) found before 1847 on and near Shooters' Hill, a gravel-capped spur 175 ft. above OD, 700 m. S.S.W. of the village. Gravel diggers are reported to have discovered many human skeletons in the area, including three without heads. One pot, daggers, spearheads, necklaces, etc., were found. In 1866 further skeletons were found on the site as well as 'two limestone coffins'. These may be Roman and perhaps came from the churchyard. (A. Meaney, Gazetteer, 186 for all refs.; see also OS Record Cards; Whellan, Dir., 742)

b(7) Anglo-Saxon Burial (centred SP 966752) was found in 1883 by ironstone diggers on the slopes of the Nene Valley near the road to Ringstead. Calcined bones were contained in an unusual jug-shaped urn with a funnel handle, ornamented with a rope-pattern and incised zig-zag lines. This vessel is one of the very rare English examples of a type found in cemeteries in the Bremen region of Germany. It is probably 5th-century in date (BM; PSA, IX (1883), 322–3; A. Meaney, Gazetteer, 186; J. Northants. Mus. and Art Gal., 6 (1969), 43). Other urns, spearheads and shield bosses are also said to have come from the site (OS Record Cards). Recent field-walking in the area has produced a few sandy hand made Saxon sherds (Beds. Arch. J., 7 (1972), 12, Great Addington 2).

(8) Cultivation Remains. The common fields of the parish were enclosed by Act of Parliament in 1803 (NRO, Enclosure Map). The apparent enclosure of land here in 1607 which led to riots (VCH Northants., III (1930), 155) must have been on a very small scale, for in 1803 there was only one other small enclosed field beyond the normal 'old enclosures' around the village. Small areas of ridge-and-furrow of the former common fields still remain, or can be traced on air photographs, over the whole parish in the form of interlocked furlongs generally of C-shape. Ridge-and-furrow also survives immediately E. and N.E. of the village, alongside a small brook. It is straight or slightly curved, within existing fields and with well-marked headlands, and was all within old enclosures in 1803 (RAF VAP CPE/UK 1925, 1248–54, 4338–43).

== Geography ==
Nearby settlements include Little Addington, Woodford, Ringstead, Denford, Irthlingborough, Raunds, Thrapston, Higham Ferrers, Kettering, Chelveston, Wellingborough and Stanwick.

== Demography ==
- In 1801 there were 200 persons
- In 1831 there were 282 persons
- In 1841 there were 266 persons
- In 2011 there were 327 persons
