= Thomas Bromley (chief justice) =

English judge

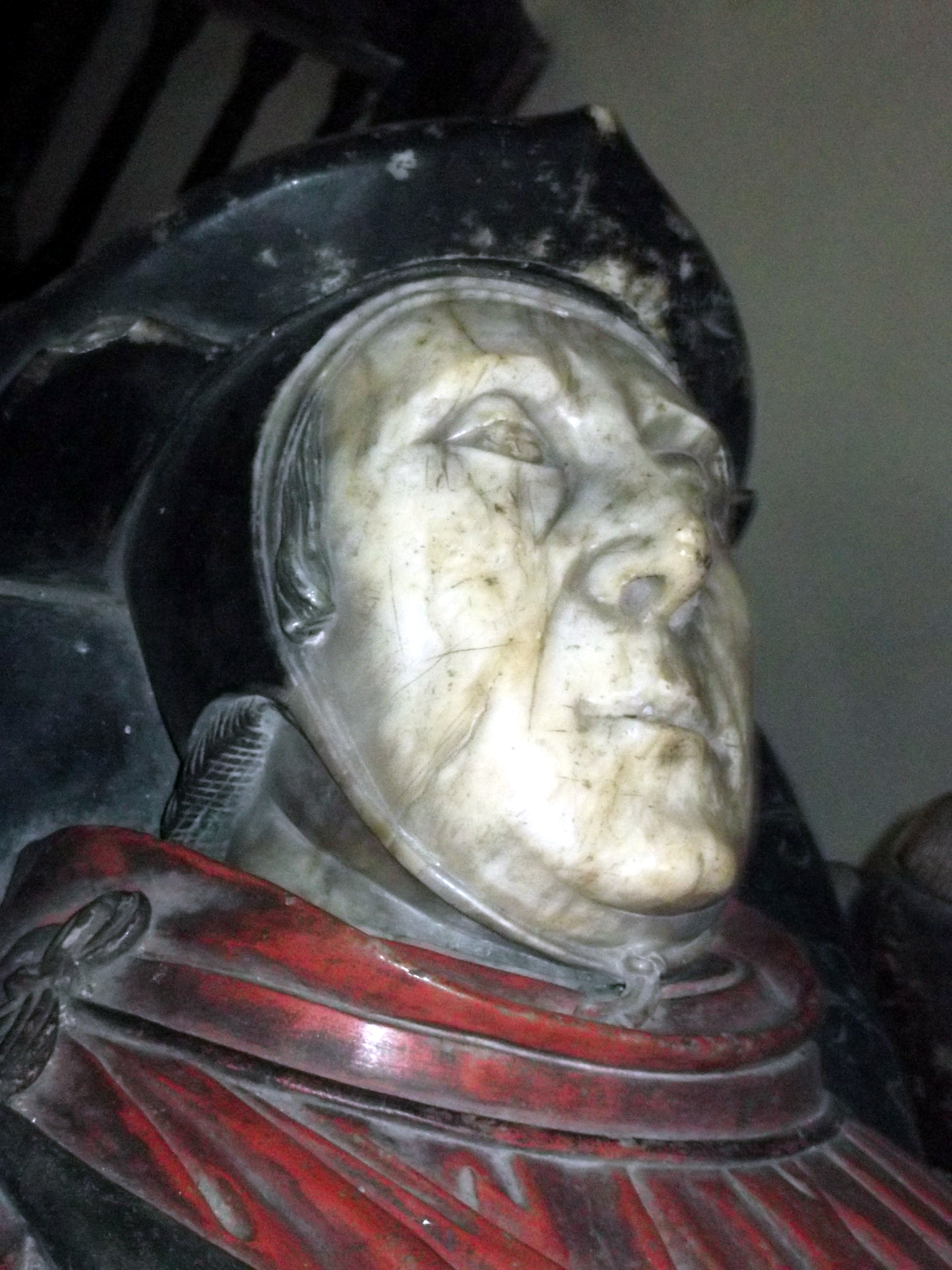
Effigy of Thomas Bromley, St Andrew's parish church, Wroxeter, Shropshire.

Sir Thomas Bromley (died 1555) was an English judge of Shropshire landed gentry origins who came to prominence during the Mid-Tudor period. After occupying important judicial posts in the Welsh Marches, he won the favour of Henry VIII and was a member of Edward VI's regency council. He was appointed Chief Justice of the King's Bench by Mary I.

== Family-background ==
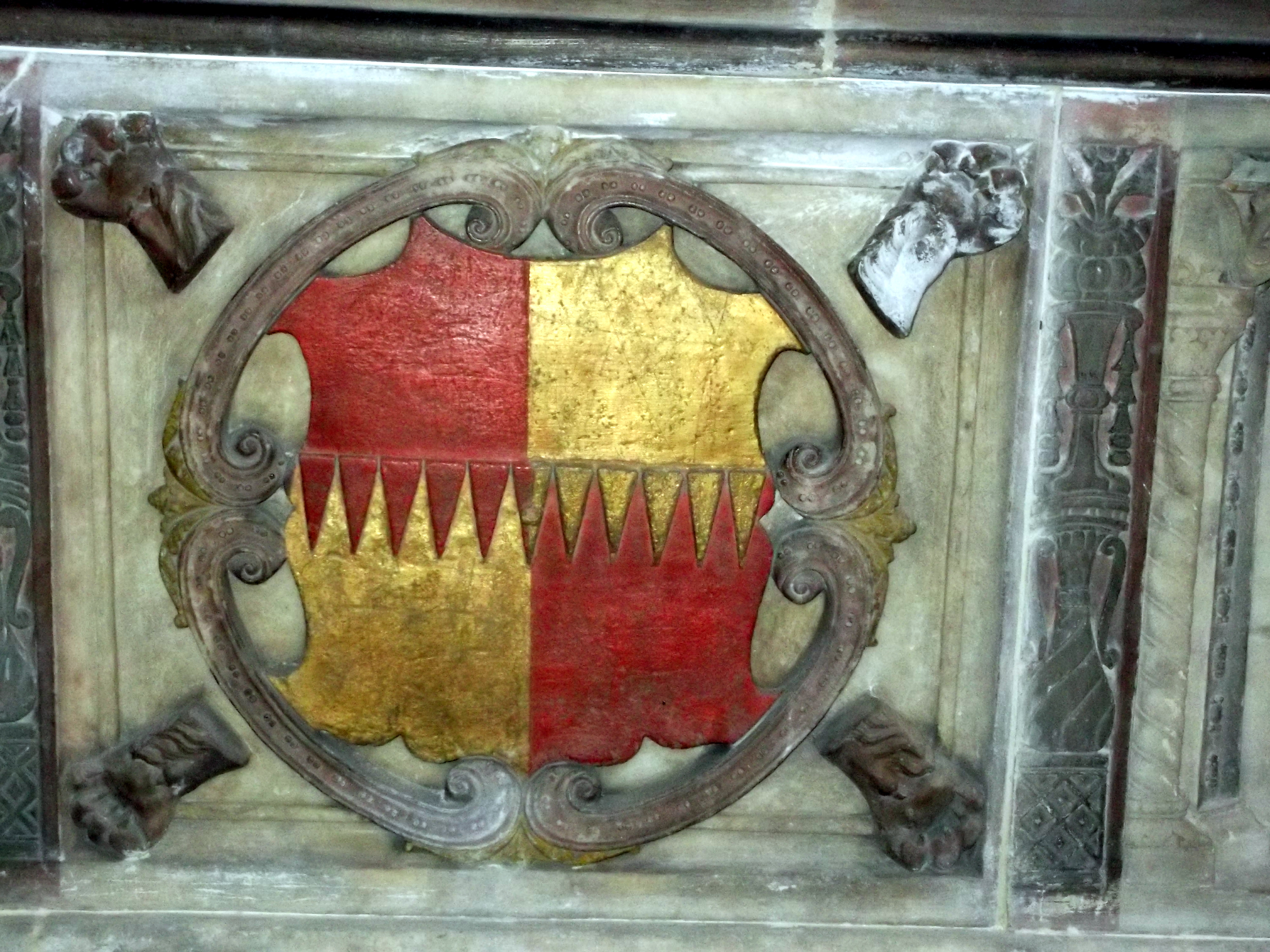
Arms of Thomas Bromley, from his tomb at Wroxeter. The Visitation of Cheshire describes the Bromley arms as: "Quarterly per fess indented Gules and Or."

Bromley was of a Shropshire gentry family, which traced its origins to Eccleshall in the neighbouring county of Staffordshire and the family had acquired land through marriage in other neighbouring counties. In the mid-15th century, Thomas's grandfather married an heiress from Malpas, Cheshire. Their allies, the Hills, had married apparently into the same family, not disdaining marriage for gain, although the family concerned had declined from the medieval nobility to merely yeoman status. Thomas's uncle William was married to a Hill and the two families were to prosper together in the 16th century.

A number of the Bromleys attained note as lawyers and politicians in the 16th century: Thomas's cousin George was a distinguished member of the Inner Temple: the later Lord Chancellor, Sir Thomas Bromley (1530–1587), and Sir George Bromley (c.1526–89), the justice of Chester, were Thomas's first cousins, once removed.

However, Thomas Bromley's own beginnings were not auspicious, as his family was a cadet branch of a then relatively minor family. The dates of his legal training suggest he was born in the early years of the 16th century, probably at the Shropshire home of his parents. He was the second son of

- Roger Bromley, third son of Roger Bromley of Mitley, Shropshire
- Jane Jennings, daughter of Thomas Jennings of Walliborne Hall, Church Pulverbatch.

=== Family tree: the Bromley dynasty ===
The relationship between the Bromley politicians and lawyers of the 16th century, and between them and their allies in the Hill, Corbet and Newport families, is illustrated in the family tree, c.1450–1650. Based primarily on the Heraldic Visitations of Shropshire and Cheshire, with assistance from the History of Parliament Online.

David Browe of Malpas, Cheshire	Jane Mitley	Roger Bromley of Mitley
Humphrey Hill of Blore and Buntingsdale	Agnes, daughter and coheiress of John Bird of Charlton, Shropshire, granddaughter and heiress of David of Malpas	Unknown, daughter and coheiress of David Browe	Roger Bromley of Mitley
Thomas Hill	Margaret Wilbraham of Woodhey, near Faddiley, Cheshire	Beatrix Hill	William Bromley of Mitley	Roger Bromley	Jane Jennings of Walliborne Hall, Church Pulverbatch
Sir Rowland Hill (died 1561), of London and Hodnet, Lord Mayor of London	Joanna Hill	John Gratewood	George Bromley of Hodnet, High Sheriff of Shropshire 1521-2	Jane Lacon of Willey, Shropshire	William Bromley	Elizabeth Dodd of Cloverley, near Calverhall, Shropshire	THOMAS BROMLEY (died 1555) of Eyton on Severn, Wroxeter and Shrewsbury, Chief Justice of the Queen's Bench	Isabel Lyster of Rowton, Shropshire
Reginald Corbet (died 1566) of Adderley and Stoke upon Tern, MP for Much Wenlock and Shrewsbury, Justice of the King's Bench	Alice Gratewood, co-heiress of Sir Rowland Hill	Thomas Bromley (1530–87), of Rodd Castle and Hodnet, MP for Bridgnorth, Wigan and Guildford, Lord Chancellor	Elizabeth Fortescue of Shirburn, Oxfordshire	Sir George Bromley (c.1526–89), of Hallon in Worfield, MP for Much Wenlock, Liskeard and Shropshire	Joanne Waverton of Worfield	Margaret Bromley	Sir Richard Newport (died 1570) of High Ercall, MP for Shropshire
Richard Corbet	Anne Bromley	Elizabeth Bromley	Sir Oliver Cromwell (died 1655) of Hinchingbrooke House and Ramsey Abbey, MP for Huntingdonshire	Sir Henry Bromley (c.1560–1615), of Holt Castle and Shrawardine Castle, MP for Plymouth, Worcestershire and Shropshire	Elizabeth Pelham	Francis Bromley (c.1556–91), of Hodnet, MP for Shropshire	Sir Edward Bromley (1563–1626), of Shifnall Grange and Bridgnorth, Baron of the Exchequer, MP for Bridgnorth	Francis Newport, MP for Shropshire
Sir John Corbet, 1st Baronet, of Stoke upon Tern, MP for Shropshire, prominent Presbyterian and Parliamentarian	Thomas Bromley, MP for Worcestershire	Richard Newport, 1st Baron Newport, MP for Shropshire, prominent Royalist

== Legal training ==
The Bromleys were already involved with the Law. George Bromley, Thomas's elder cousin, was an important member of the Inner Temple and had been appointed Autumn Reader for 1508 and Lent Reader for 1509, although he recused himself when so honoured for Lent 1515. The first evidence of Thomas Bromley's legal career dates from May 1519, when he was suspended by the parliament of the Inner Temple for offensive behaviour toward the chief governor:

"Order that Widdon and Brumley, the younger, be sent out of commons because they evilly behaved themselves towards Master Sutton, the chief governor, at the time of the last vacation."

His penitence was duly recorded in the Law French still widely employed by lawyers at the time:

"Thomas Bromele permitte et graunte all compeney de le Inner Tempell de paier mes commons et auteres duetes en le dit Tempell, et de etre goveryn et redresse par les governers et par le dit compeney, et de obaier et performer totes maners ordnaunces de le compeney de le dit Tempell, sur payne detre oust a tous jourz. Pleg, John Whiddon, Thomas Newton"

This was followed by a similar undertaking from Whiddon.

Despite his "youthful indiscretion", Bromley rose fairly quickly to positions of trust and responsibility at the Inn, while presumably making a living primarily from private practice and, increasingly, public appointments to judicial posts. In 1526 the parliament of the Inn appointed him one of the auditors for the building of a wall by the River Thames. In November 1528, as Whiddon, his former accomplice, was reappointed Reader for the following Lent, Bromley was appointed as one of the auditors to the Treasurer of the Inner Temple. After attending the Lent Reader for two successive years, in May 1533 Bromley was at last elected Reader for the following autumn. By February 1534 his standing was such that the Inn admitted one William Walter on his recommendation, free of all charges apart from the cost of his wine. In June 1539 Bromley was appointed serjeant-at-law by Henry VIII. He was immediately declared the next Autumn Reader, as was the custom. The records of the Inner Temple show that he refused the honour and was fined £10. However the entry recording this is crossed out, and it is not recorded whether Bromley retracted and performed the office or was pardoned. In November 1539, he was appointed Reader for Lent 1540, but two others were nominated as reserves. All three were honoured in this way in recognition of their appointment as serjeants-at-law. In the event, Bromley did not lecture for the full term but was replaced by one of his attendants after the second week,

"in consideracion that it apperyd suche debylete in the seyde Thomas Bromley that he was not lyke too have keppyd owte the hole redyng in the seyde vacacion of Lente."

The precise nature of his "debility" is unknown but it appears to have affected him often.

== Judicial and political career ==
Throughout his time of gradual academic and administrative advancement at the Inner Temple, Bromley was also advancing his political and judicial career.

=== Member of Parliament ===
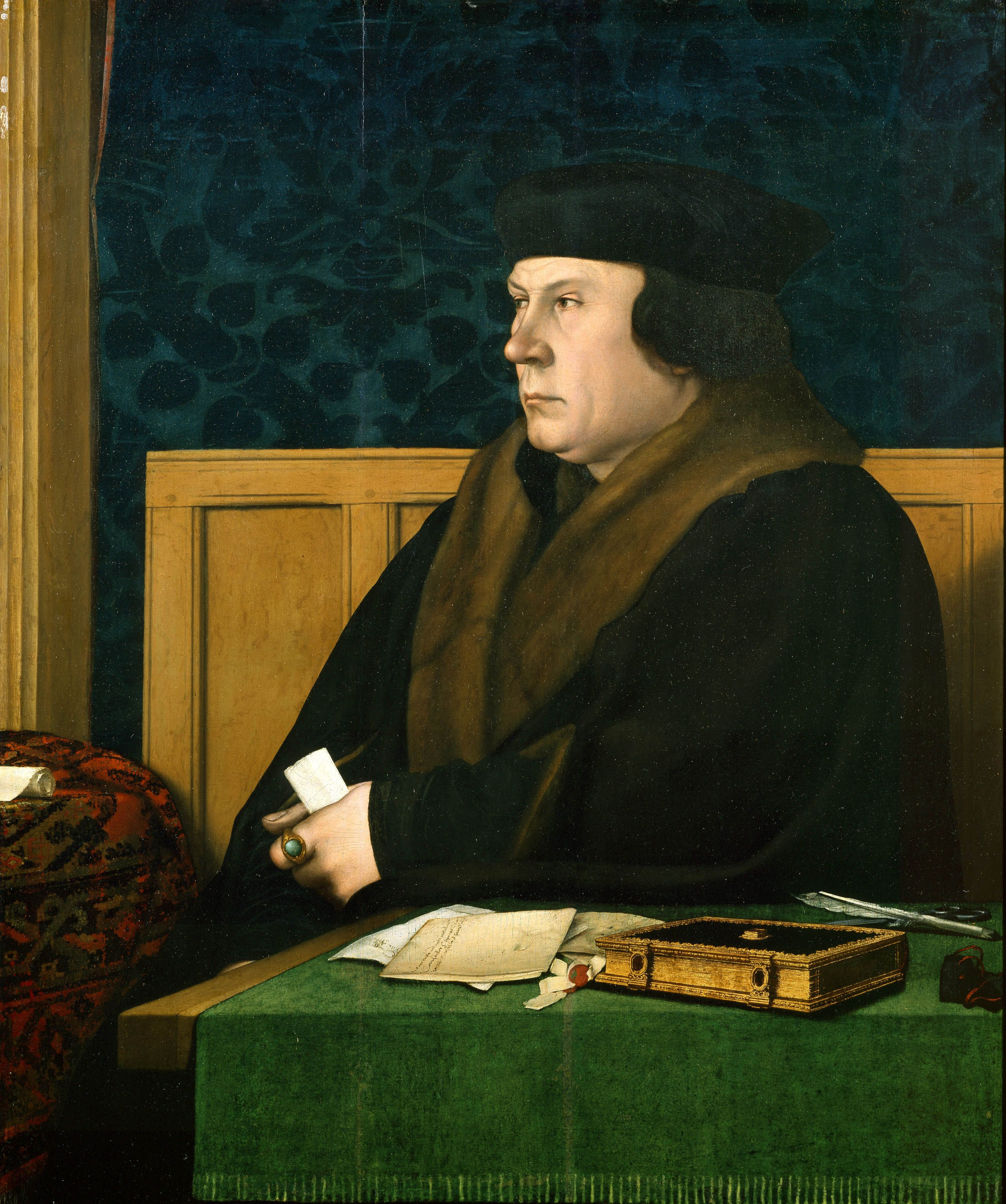
Thomas Cromwell, by Hans Holbein the Younger. It seems that Cromwell's distrust acted as a brake on Bromley's career. His judicial promotion and property speculation both forged ahead as Cromwell's power came to an end.

It seems likely that Bromley served as an MP in the English Reformation Parliament of 1529–36. This was first suggested by the historian Albert Pollard. The History of Parliament Online suggests that he might even have served in the succeeding parliaments, a view made plausible by the scantiness of records on the identity of members. The main evidence for his sitting in the English House of Commons is a list of MPs drawn up by Thomas Cromwell, the powerful chief minister and parliamentary fixer of Henry VIII, in 1533. It is headed by Sir George Throckmorton, a prominent religious conservative, and those on it were either of similar opinions or heavily committed to the wool trade, both groups being generally opposed to a break with the Papacy. Hence it probably lists those likely to oppose the Statute in Restraint of Appeals, a key piece of Reformation legislation. Bromley is listed twice: an entry near the head has been crossed out and he is named again at the foot of the list. His presence on the list means that he had displeased Cromwell. It is also fairly certain evidence that he did sit as an MP for at least some of the parliament after being returned in a by-election. His constituency is unknown but Lostwithiel and Lancaster have been suggested.

=== A local power base ===
However, Parliament was not to be the main theatre of Bromley's political life. His own native county offered opportunities for gaining political advantage. As there was no resident aristocracy, the Shropshire gentry were the main power in the county and also exercised considerable influence in the cloth town of Shrewsbury, where merchants and lawyers ruled. Once again, his cousin George had beaten the path, becoming Recorder of Shrewsbury and High Sheriff of Shropshire in 1522.

Thomas Bromley secured the freedom of Shrewsbury in 1528 and in 1529 admission to the Drapers' Company of Shrewsbury. Chartered by Edward IV in 1461, it was one of the two guilds that dominated this cloth town (the other being the Mercers). Around 1532 he became Warden of the Company, and at about the same time he was made an alderman – one of the council of 12 that assisted the two bailiffs in running the town. – a post he was to hold until his death. In 1536 he was appointed a Justice of the Peace in Shropshire. By 1537 he had been appointed Recorder of Shrewsbury: its senior legal and judicial officer. As this carried a heavy responsibility for representing the interests of the town in London, it fitted well with his activities at the Inner Temple, requiring him to spend only a little time in Shrewsbury itself.

Bromley was a close friend of Rowland Hill, who was an uncle of George Bromley. Hill's career ran parallel to Bromley's but with even greater success, pairing a regional power base in Shropshire with a spectacular career as a mercer in London: by 1541, the year before he was knighted, he was paying at least 5000 marks a year in tax and in 1549 became the first Protestant Mayor of London. Between 1539 and 1547, Hill invested a substantial part of his commercial wealth in great quantities of landed property in Shropshire and the neighbouring counties that had been made available by the dissolution of the monasteries or the abolition of chantries and colleges. Bromley speculated in some of Hill's deals and, like other prominent lawyers, built up considerable estates in his native county, including land at Wroxeter, which became his seat. Among properties he purchased in the area were Eyton on Severn and Aston, both manors formerly belonging to Shrewsbury Abbey. On its sale to Bromley by the Crown in 1540, Aston was attached as a member of Eyton and was passed on along with it to his heirs. Similarly, near Stanton Long, he bought Oxenbold, partly in the parish of Monkhopton, and a former manor of Wenlock Priory, from John Jennings, and in 1545 added to it the neighbouring estate of Patton.

As his status nationally rose through judicial preferment, Bromley was able to shift and consolidate his regional power. He became a Justice of the Peace in the Marcher counties of Gloucestershire, Worcestershire and Herefordshire during 1540–1. At the succession of Edward VI his importance in government reached a stage where the recordership of Shrewsbury was no longer appropriate and he relinquished it to Reginald Corbet, another Hill ally. By this time he had been appointed Custos Rotulorum of Shropshire, the senior post in the county's civil government. By 1552 he had joined the Council in the Marches, the regional representative of central government in much of Wales and the border counties.

=== Judicial promotion ===
From 1534 Bromley was Justice in Eyre for South Wales. At about the same time, Thomas Cromwell installed Rowland Lee, the Bishop of Coventry and Lichfield, as Lord President of the Council in the Marches of Wales. Lee was a ruthless reformer, determined to stamp out corruption and to establish a reputation for the organs of justice in his region. Seeing Bromley as a natural ally, he wrote to Cromwell in 1536 and 1537, recommending him for promotion. Lee was the former tutor of Cromwell's children and had considerable influence with him but could not win his support for Bromley, so his continued preferment came only with the loosening of Cromwell's grip on power.

Bromley received his call to the coif, i.e. his writ to become a serjeant-at-law, in the summer of 1539, although it was not to take effect until the day after the Nativity of St. John the Baptist, i.e. 25 June, in 1540. Significantly, another Inner Templar so-honoured at the same time was William Coningsby, an older lawyer who had also earned the hostility of Cromwell and had recently spent ten days in prison. The parliament of the Inner Temple decreed a traditional ceremony of leave-taking for them.

"Memorandum that att this parlement it is orderyd that Master Conysby and Master Bromley, wiche procedit serjant crastino Johannis, shall have, every off them, fyve pounde and a pere off glovys off iijd., accordynge too the ancient use, wiche wer delyveryd unto them, etc., att ther departynges att the hall dore of Temple, after ther proposission and leve takyn att the fyer."

Coningsby was dead within three-month but Bromley was promoted still further, to King's Serjeant, by November of the same year. He was made Justice of the Peace across five more Midland counties and in Norfolk and Suffolk, his responsibilities now literally spanning the country. On 4 November 1544 he succeeded Sir John Spelman as a judge of the King's Bench.

=== The years of power ===
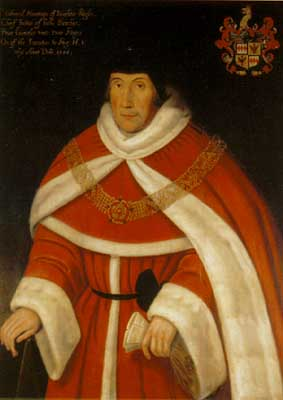
Sir Edward Montagu. He was browbeaten into approving the succession of Lady Jane Grey, along with Bromley. Edward Foss, the judicial biographer, contrasts their respective treatment by Queen Mary.

Bromley was held in favour by Henry VIII, who made him one of the executors of his will, and bequeathed him a legacy of £300. Hence he was one of the council of regency to Edward VI and a Privy Counsellor; but, although he succeeded in avoiding political entanglements for some time, at the close of the reign he became implicated in Northumberland's scheme for the succession of Lady Jane Grey. The duke summoned to court Montagu, chief justice of the common pleas, Bromley, Sir John Baker, and the attorney- and solicitor-general, and informed them of the king's desire to settle the crown on Lady Jane. They replied that it would be illegal, and prayed an adjournment, and next day expressed an opinion that all parties to such a settlement would be guilty of high treason. Northumberland's violence then became so great that both Bromley and Montagu were in bodily fear; and two days later, when a similar scene took place, and the king ordered them on their allegiance to despatch the matter, they consented to settle the deed, receiving an express commission under the great seal to do so and a general pardon. Bromley, however, adroitly avoided witnessing the deed.

Consequently, when Mary I sent the lord chief justice to gaol, she made Bromley chief justice of the King's Bench, in place of Sir Roger Cholmeley, on 4 October 1553. Burnet says of him that he was 'a papist at heart,' contrasting his treatment with that of Montagu, who was imprisoned and fined, although he had sent an armed force to support Mary's uprising. The statement is repeated by Foss and by the Dictionary of National Biography (DNB), but it is pointedly absent from the recent Oxford Dictionary of National Biography, and is specifically contradicted by the History of Parliament.

=== Fall from favour? ===
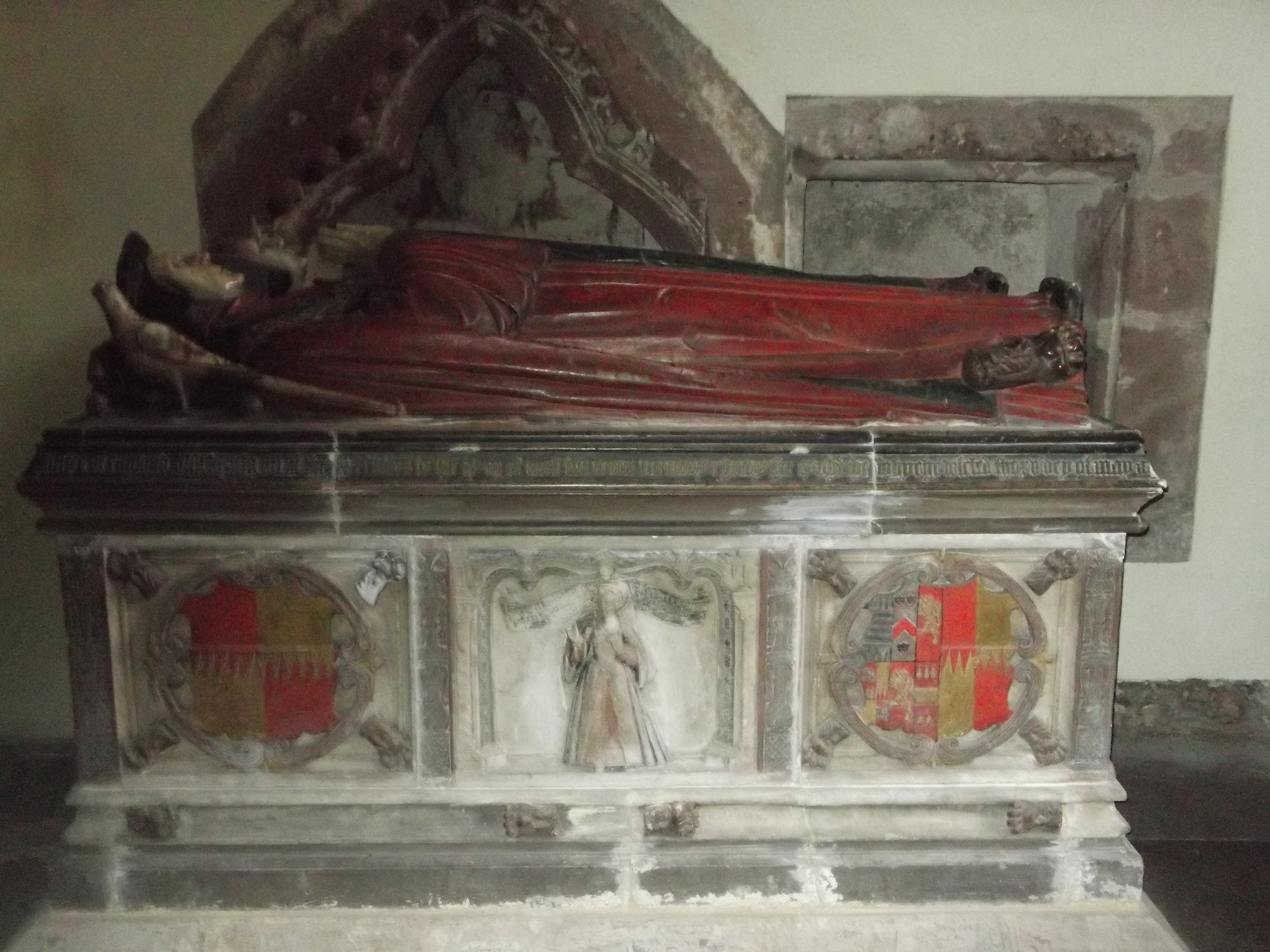
Tomb of Thomas Bromley and Isabel Lyster, Wroxeter.

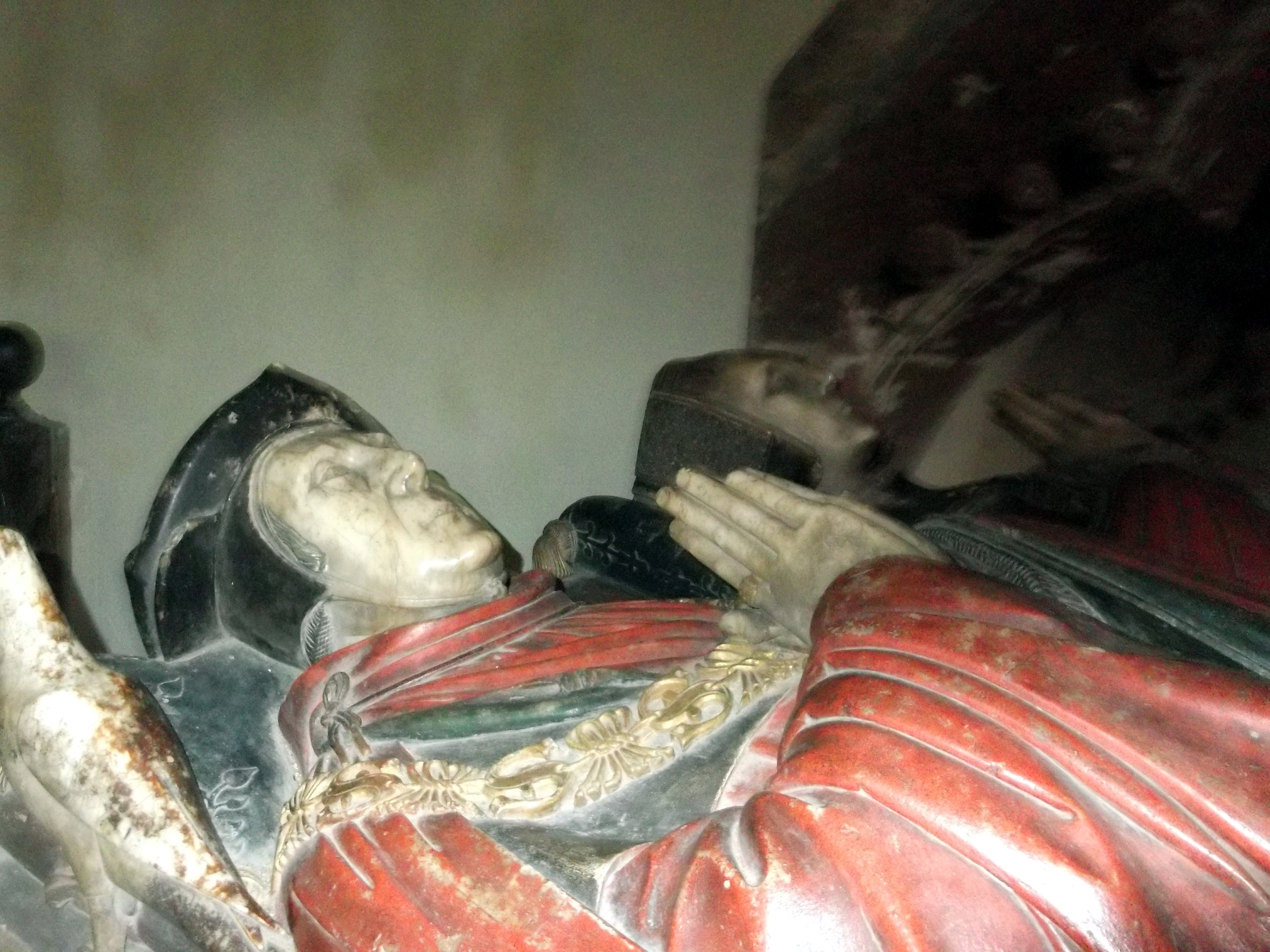
Effigies of Thomas Bromley and his wife, Isabel Lyster, Wroxeter, Shropshire.

Bromley presided over the trials of a number of those implicated in Wyatt's rebellion. On 17 April 1554 Sir Nicholas Throckmorton and others were indicted for a plot and treason at Baynard's Castle on 23 November 1553, and for a rising and march towards London with Sir Henry Isley and two thousand men. Bromley presided at the trial, and allowed the prisoner such unusual freedom of speech as to provoke complaints from the queen's attorney, and threats of retiring from the prosecution. Yet Bromley was not throughout impartial, but even refused the prisoner leave to call a witness, though he was in court, and denied him inspection of a statute on which he relied. His summing up was so defective, 'for want of memory or goodwill,' that the prisoner supplied its defects, as if he had been an uninterested spectator. Yet the prisoner was acquitted: so much to Mary I's annoyance that the jury were punished for their verdict. Foss comments that "Sir Thomas Bromley cannot escape from the charge of undue severity, though probably he was complained of at the time for giving too great license to the prisoner."

Sir William Portman succeeded Bromley as chief justice on 11 June 1555. The exact date, even the year, of Bromley's death was not known when the DNB account of his life was written, leaving the impression that the Queen's displeasure might have led to his disgrace and dismissal. However, recent sources concur in dating his about four before Portman's succession, making this supposition unnecessary.

== Death ==
Bromley's death occurred on 15 May 1555. In his will, admittedly dating from 1552, in the reign of Edward VI, he names as executors his wife and Sir Rowland Hill, his friend and business partner, a noted Protestant. He commends himself to God's care, "by the merits of the blood and passion of our Saviour Jesu Christ" and there are no specifically Catholic provisions, undermining Burnet's assessment of his religious beliefs. He left considerable sums to provide for the poor in and around Shrewsbury. He left just a gold piece for Hill as a keepsake of the "olde love and amytie" between them. There were also bequests to relatives, including 40 shillings a year for ten years for the young Thomas Bromley, the future Lord Chancellor, on condition that he continued his legal studies. The remainder was divided between his widow and daughter.

Bromley was buried in St Andrew's Church, Wroxeter. An alabaster monument was constructed there, portraying him in judicial robes alongside his wife.

== Marriages and family ==
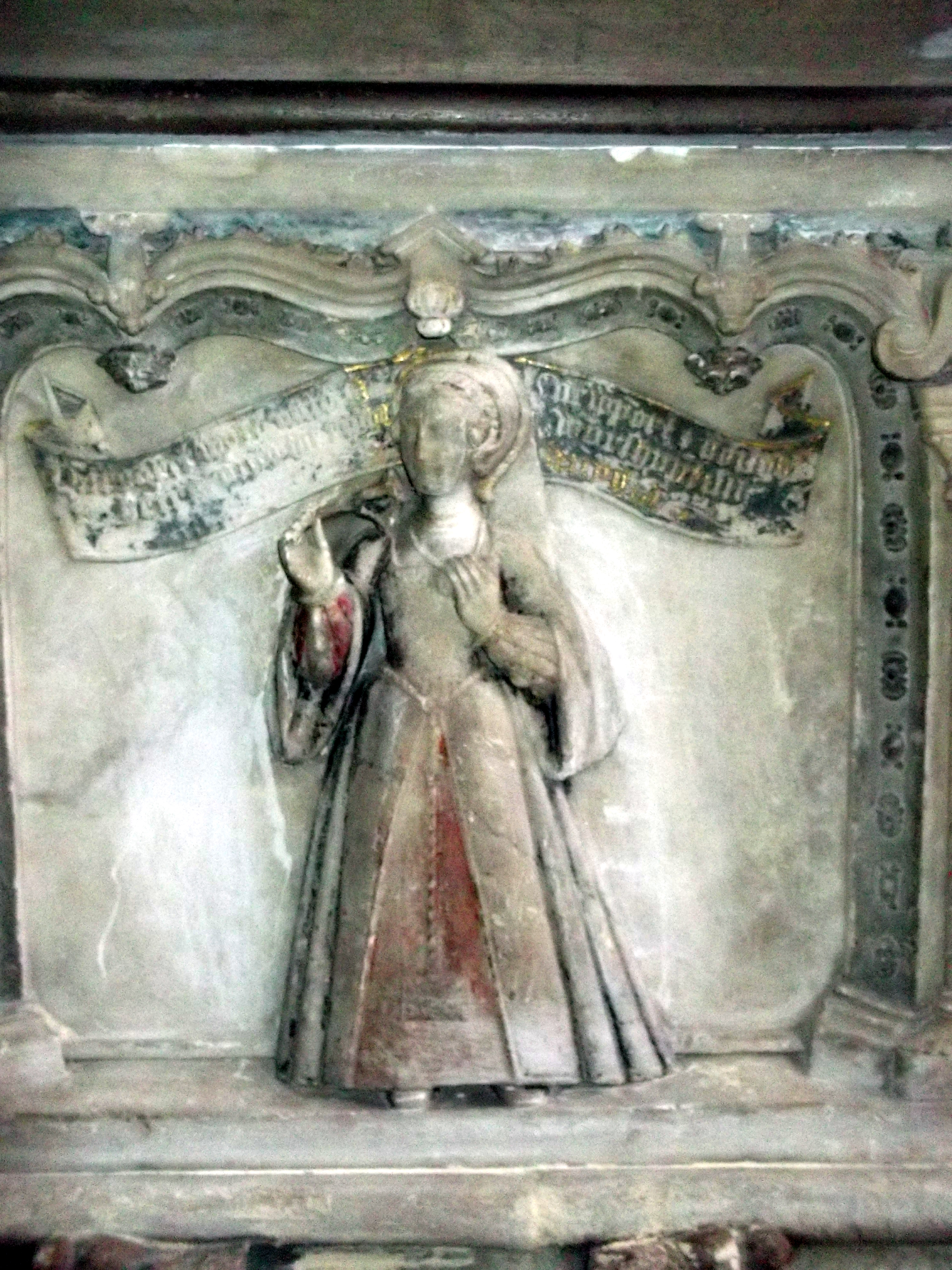
Margaret, daughter of Thomas Bromley and his wife, Isabel Lyster, portrayed on the Bromley tomb, Wroxeter.

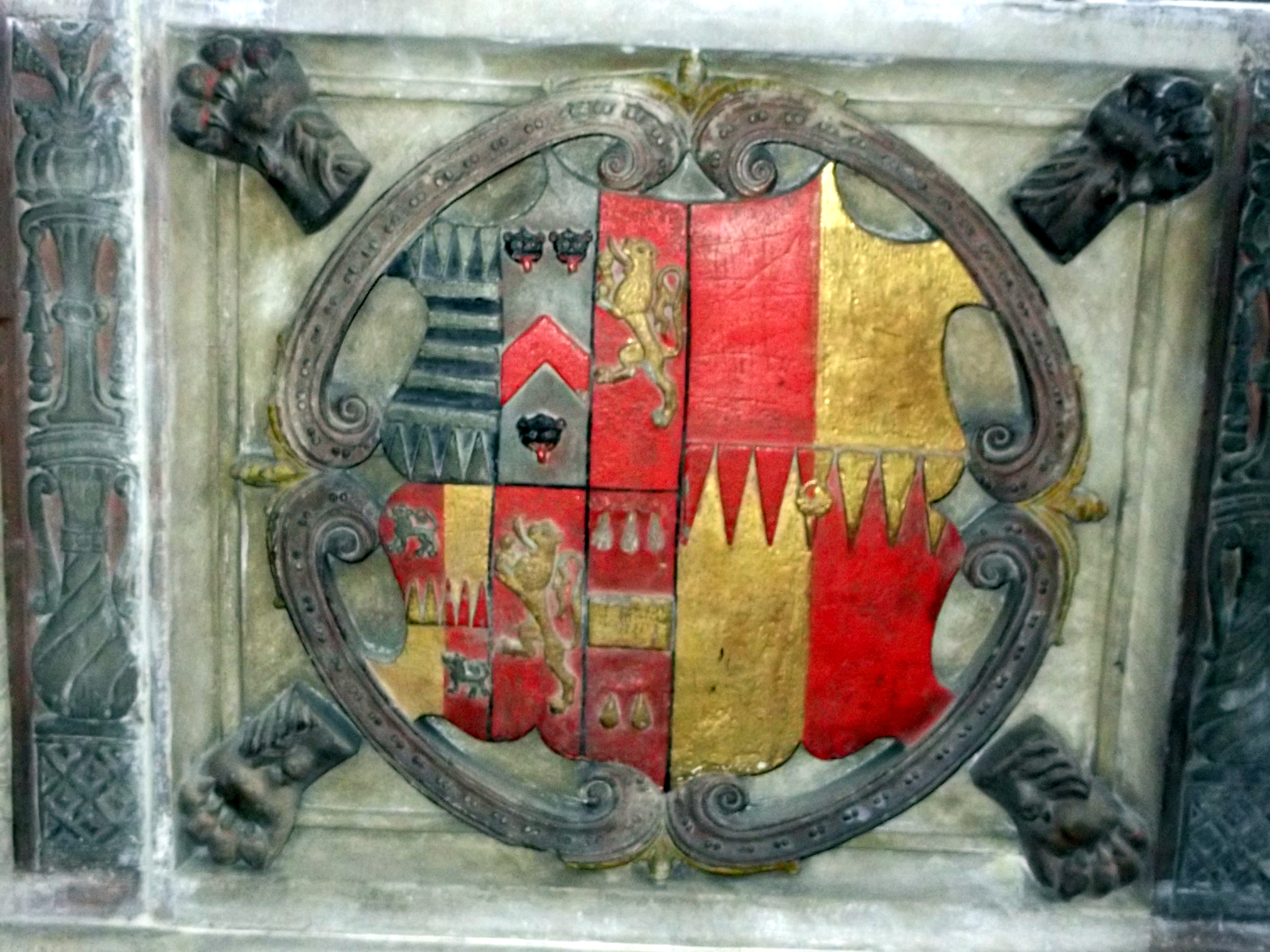
Arms of Thomas Bromley impaled with those of his wife, Isabel Lyster.

The Visitation of Shropshire gives Elizabeth Dodd as Bromley's first wife. She was the daughter of John Dodd of Chorley, also given as Cloverley, which is a short distance south-east of Calverhall in north Shropshire. Nothing further is known of the marriage and some sources question its existence.

By 1526 he was married to Isabel Lyster or Lister, daughter of Richard Lyster of Rowton, Shropshire. She survived him and acted as an executor of his will, inheriting half of his residual property. Thomas and Isabel Bromley left one daughter, Margaret. As there was no male heir the greater part of Bromley's property ultimately passed to Margaret.

== Descendants ==
Margaret Bromley married Sir Richard Newport, an important local landowner whose seat at High Ercall Hall lay just to the north-east of Wroxeter, in sight of the Wrekin. Margaret and Richard Newport had four sons, of whom two died in infancy, and three or four daughters.

- Sir Francis Newport, the eldest son and heir, married Beatrix Lacon. Their son and heir was

- Richard Newport, 1st Baron Newport, whose title was a reward from Charles I for his financial support at the beginning of the English Civil War. His heir was:

- Francis Newport, 1st Earl of Bradford, an important regional enforcer for Charles II and a Whig politician. Through him Bromley became ancestor of subsequent Earls of Bradford, although the title later passed through the female line to the Bridgeman family.

- Andrew Newport, the fourth son, was MP for Shrewsbury
- Mary Newport, married William Gratewood, nephew of Rowland Hill. However, the entry for the Newports in the Visitation of Shropshire features Mary twice, initially as a sister of Sir Richard, and only afterwards as a daughter. Moreover, there has been understandable confusion between Mary and Magdalen, her sister or niece. Placing her as a sister of Sir Richard seems more plausible chronologically, but the issue is uncertain. She is omitted from the family tree below.
- Isabel Newport married Sir Charles Foxe, whose father of the same name was an Inner Templar, MP for Ludlow and Much Wenlock and secretary to the Council in the Marches. The elder Sir Charles tried to provide for the sons of his second marriage and illegitimate son in his will and the younger contested the will unsuccessfully.
- Elizabeth Newport married first Francis Lawley and later his cousin, Thomas Lawley. The former marriage produced the line of Lawley baronets.
- Magdalen Newport, married Richard Herbert (d.1597), and was a friend of the poet John Donne, as well as mother of the poet George Herbert.

=== Family tree: descendants ===
The main lines of descent from Thomas Bromley and Isabel Lyster through their daughter Margaret are shown on the following family tree. Based on the Newport pedigree in the Visitation of Shropshire, with details from History of Parliament Online.

Elizabeth Dodd of Cloverley, near Calverhall, Shropshire	THOMAS BROMLEY (died 1555) of Eyton on Severn, Wroxeter and Shrewsbury, Chief Justice of the Queen's Bench	Isabel Lyster of Rowton, Shropshire
Margaret Bromley	Sir Richard Newport (died 1570) of High Ercall, MP for Shropshire
Francis Newport, MP for Shropshire	Beatrice Lacon of Willey, Shropshire	Isabel Newport	Sir Charles Foxe	Magdalen Newport	Richard Herbert (died 1596), MP for Montgomery Boroughs and Montgomeryshire
Andrew Newport, MP for Shrewsbury	Francis Lawley of Spoonhill	Elizabeth Newport	Thomas Lawley (1547–1621) of Much Wenlock, MP for Much Wenlock
Richard Newport, 1st Baron Newport (1587–1651), MP for Shropshire, prominent Royalist	Rachel Leveson, daughter of Sir John Leveson	Sir Thomas Lawley, 1st Baronet (died 1646), of London, Twickenham, and Spoonhill, MP for Much Wenlock	Anne Manning, daughter and coheiress of John Manning of Hackney	Sir Edward Lawley (1586–1623) of Much Wenlock and St. Giles-in-the-Fields, Middlesex, MP for Much Wenlock
Andrew Newport (1622–99), MP for Montgomeryshire, Preston and Shrewsbury	Sir Francis Lawley, 2nd Baronet	Anne Whitmore, daughter of Sir Thomas Whitmore, 1st Baronet of Apley	George Herbert (1593–1633), poet and clergyman
Francis Newport, 1st Earl of Bradford (1620–1708)	Diana Russell, daughter of Francis Russell, 4th Earl of Bedford	Beatrice Newport	Henry Bromley of Holt Castle	Edward Herbert, 1st Baron Herbert of Cherbury (1582–1648), MP for Montgomeryshire and Merioneth	Mary Herbert	Henry Herbert (1595–1673), Master of the Revels
Earls of Bradford	Henry Bromley (1632–70) of Holt Castle, MP for Worcestershire	Lawley Baronets and Barons Wenlock	Barons Herbert of Chirbury, first creation	Barons Herbert of Chirbury, second creation
