= Richard Newport (died 1570) =

16th-century English landowner and politician

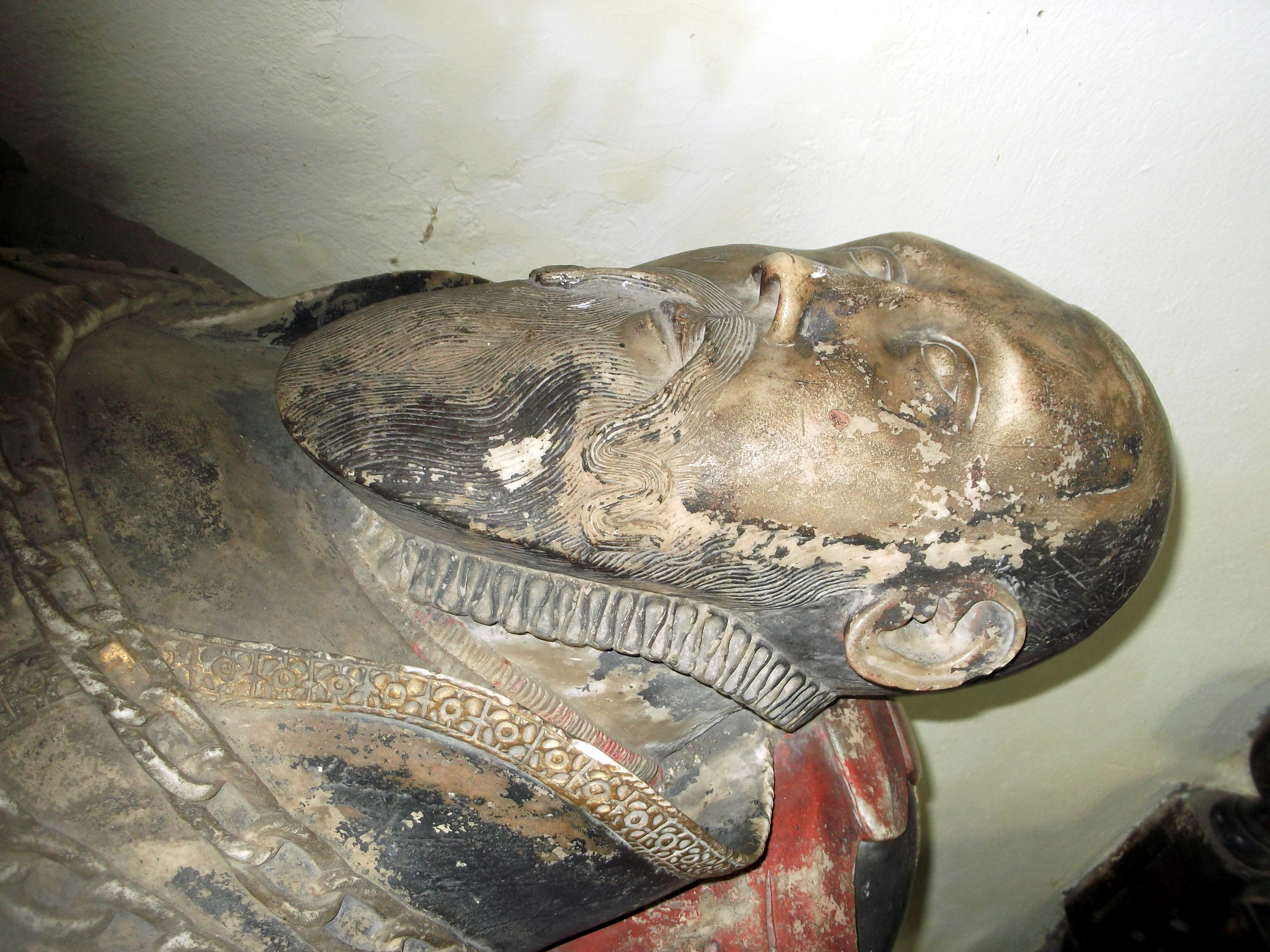
Effigy of Sir Richard Newport, St Andrew's church, Wroxeter, Shropshire.

Sir Richard Newport (by 1511–12 September 1570) was an English landowner and politician of Shropshire origin, prominent regionally during the mid-Tudor and early Elizabethan eras.

== Background ==
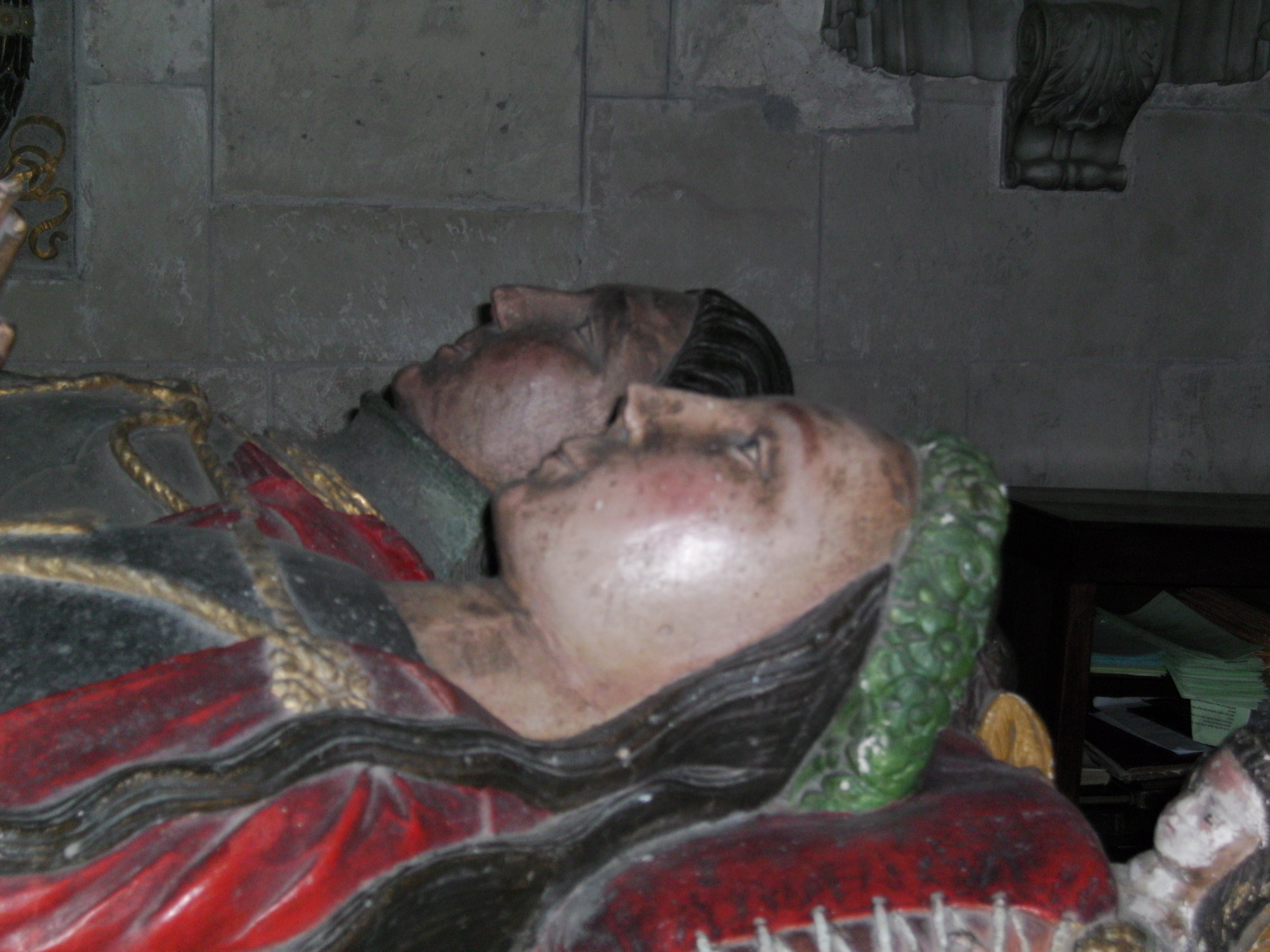
Effigies of Sir Robert and Lady Elizabeth Corbet, Newport's maternal grandparents, in St Andrew's church, Moreton Corbet, Shropshire

Richard Newport was the eldest son of Thomas Newport of High Ercall, Shropshire, and Anne Corbet, the daughter of Sir Robert Corbet of Moreton Corbet and his wife, Elizabeth Vernon.

The Newports were one of the leading families in Shropshire, a county dominated throughout the 16th century by its landed gentry, although they had land in several other counties. Thomas Newport himself greatly expanded the Newports' wealth. John Leland observed that "This man, and Mitton of Cotton by Shrobsbyri had Syr John Boroues landes in Shropshir and Warwik." This partnership is confirmed by land records showing, for example, that Newport and Mitton, together with John Lingen, their cousin and Sir John Burgh's grandson, sold their interest in Burgh's wood at Stirchley in 1501 to another cousin, Sir Edward Leighton of Wattlesborough. Newport also inherited land in Kent from Henry Grey, 4th (7th) Baron Grey of Codnor.

The Corbets were another of the group of powerful gentry families that dominated the county. Anne Corbet's brothers, Roger, Richard and Reginald, were all major landowners with numerous connections at court and, at various times, MPs. Both Richard and Reginald were prominent members of the powerful Council in the Marches of Wales, and Reginald a Justice of the King's Bench: both were considerably younger than their sister Anne, and probably not older than their nephew Richard Newport.

== Education ==
Newport was admitted to the Inner Temple by its ruling parliament on 7 May 1525. The date of Newport's admission to the Inner Temple is the main guide to his date of birth. The parliament noted that he had paid a fine of 26s 8d or two marks to be excused holding any office at his Inn or having to attend during the vacations, these being the vacation periods at the law courts, when important academic lectures and discussions were scheduled for the students. This suggests that his legal education was never intended to be at a professional level, but simply the rudiments useful to a future landowner and local politician. Nevertheless, it was an important source of contacts: Newport was to have close social and political links with other Inner Templars throughout his career.

== Career ==
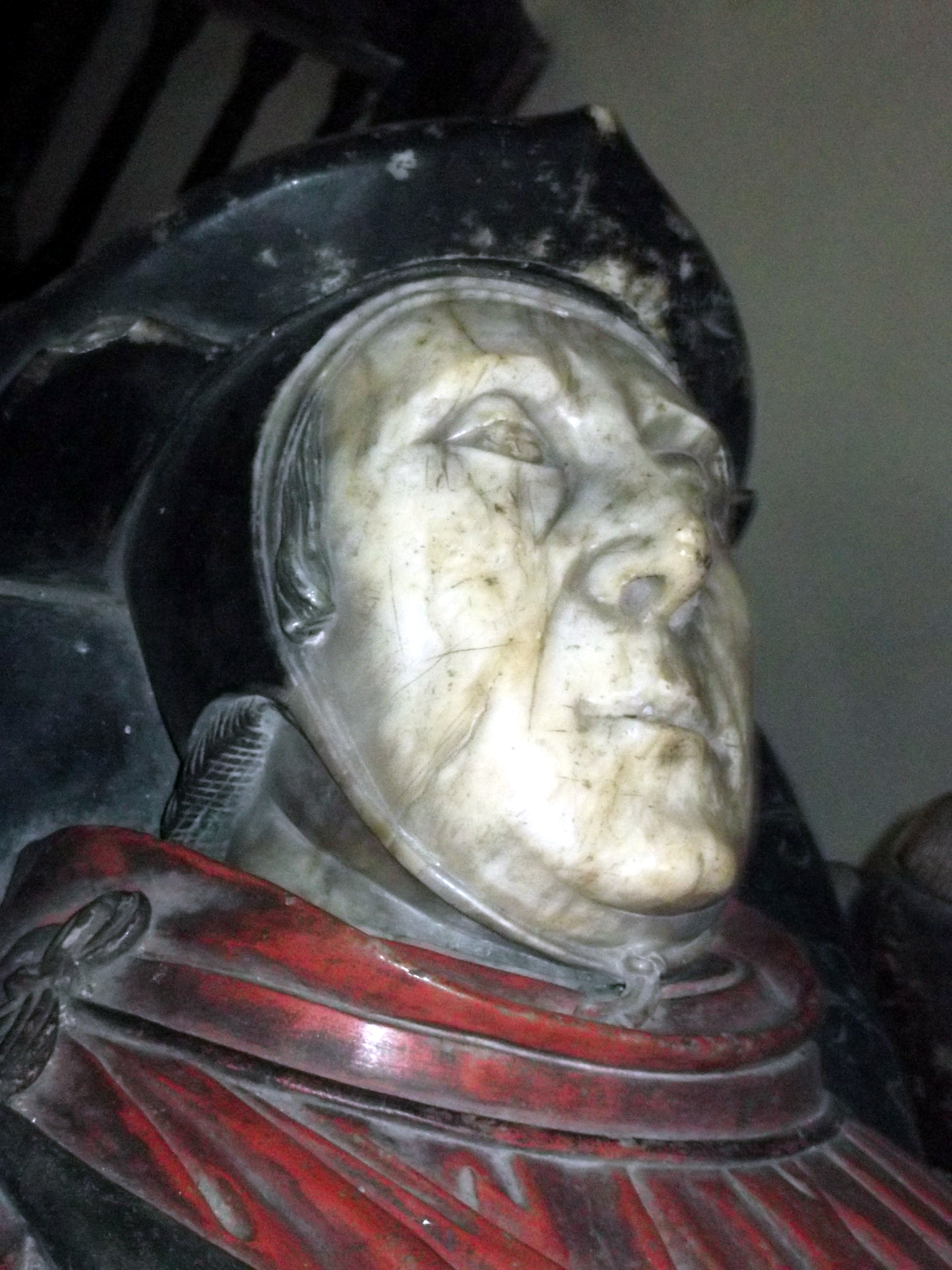
Effigy of Sir Thomas Bromley, St Andrews parish church, Wroxeter, Shropshire.

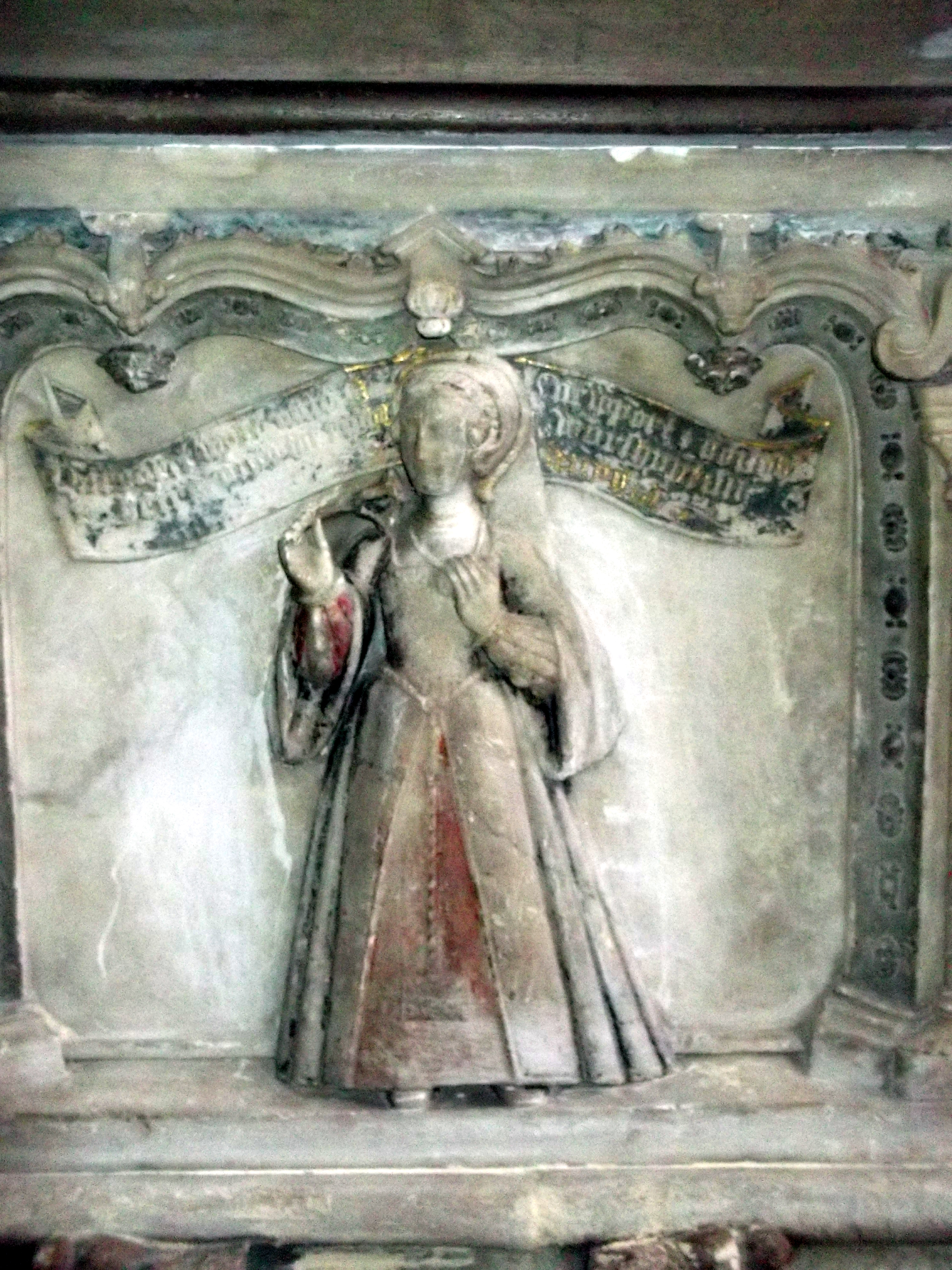
Margaret Bromley, as portrayed on her parents' tomb. Newport's marriage to her greatly raised Newport's prominence and prestige.

=== A fortunate marriage ===
Richard Newport began to make his mark politically even before he succeeded to the family estates. Some time in the 1540s he married Margaret Bromley, the daughter of Sir Thomas Bromley, a prominent member of the Inner Temple and a Justice of the King's Bench, later Lord Chief Justice of England and Wales. Bromley had profited greatly both from his legal practice and from property speculation in partnership with the immensely rich merchant Sir Rowland Hill, the first known Protestant to become Lord Mayor of London. The pair had invested heavily in lands made available by the dissolution of the monasteries, especially the large estates of Shrewsbury Abbey. As Margaret was the only child and heir to Bromley's fortune, Newport had expectation of gaining lands across five counties to add to his patrimony.

Henry VIII trusted Bromley, making him an executor of his will. On the king's death in 1547, Thomas Bromley became a member of the regency council of the boy successor, Edward VI, although he kept his distance from the political in-fighting within the council. This added access to the highest circles of government to Newport's power base among the local gentry – a factor confirmed by his own father being pricked as High Sheriff of Shropshire for 1549-50.

=== MP for Shropshire ===
Richard Newport was elected to represent Shropshire in the House of Commons of England in 1547, taking the second seat, after Sir George Blount. This was the first parliament of the reign of Edward VI and lasted until April 1552, sitting through the momentous changes of the most radical phase of the English Reformation. Blount was a friend and supporter of the avowedly-Protestant John Dudley, despite his own Catholic commitment. It is known that Blount supported and profited from further secularisation of church lands, including the chantries. However, nothing is known of Newport's parliamentary contribution. He was paid 13d. in 1549 by Shrewsbury's bailiffs on returning from Norfolk, which suggests that he, like Blount, was involved in the campaign to suppress Kett's Rebellion.

In 1551, Thomas Newport died and Richard succeeded to his estates. Although a large landowner, Thomas had been forced to set aside two thirds of his valuable estate at Bickmarsh, then in Warwickshire, in trust to yield funds for the marriage of Richard's sisters, Ursula and Katherine – a process expected to take about ten years. The remaining third, in addition to estates around Newport, Shropshire, he used to set up his younger sons with homes and estates for life. This still left £100 to find for Elizabeth, Richard's youngest sister. Although a considerable part of his wealth was potential rather than actual, Richard Newport was made sheriff of his native county immediately after inheriting.

In 1553 he was made commissioner for the goods of churches and fraternities in Shropshire, so he was certainly prepared to profit from the dissolution of church institutions. Newport was in good standing with the regime, throughout changes in leadership, but this gives little indication of his true political and religious inclinations. As the example of his colleague Blount shows, personal loyalties and interests might affect actions more than ideology. One clue to Newport's probably evolving beliefs is that he owned a copy of Edward Hall's chronicle of the Wars of the Roses and early Tudor period, entitled The Union of the Two Noble and Illustre Families of Lancastre and Yorke. This appeared in 1548, after the author's death, and is notable for its anti-clerical tone, especially in the sections on what Hall regarded as the abuses of Cardinal Wolsey's ascendancy. Hall supported the breach with the Papacy and placed great emphasis on submission to royal power, which seems to accord with Newport's own inclinations. Only occasionally, however, did he express his Protestant loyalties explicitly, as in a passage dealing with the death of William Tyndale in which he wrote with approval of the role of Martin Luther. Hall seems to have had some links with Shropshire, as he was MP for Much Wenlock and Bridgnorth. Newport's copy of his chronicle, containing annotations sometimes attributed to William Shakespeare, is now in the Library at Eton College, Windsor.

=== Under Queen Mary ===
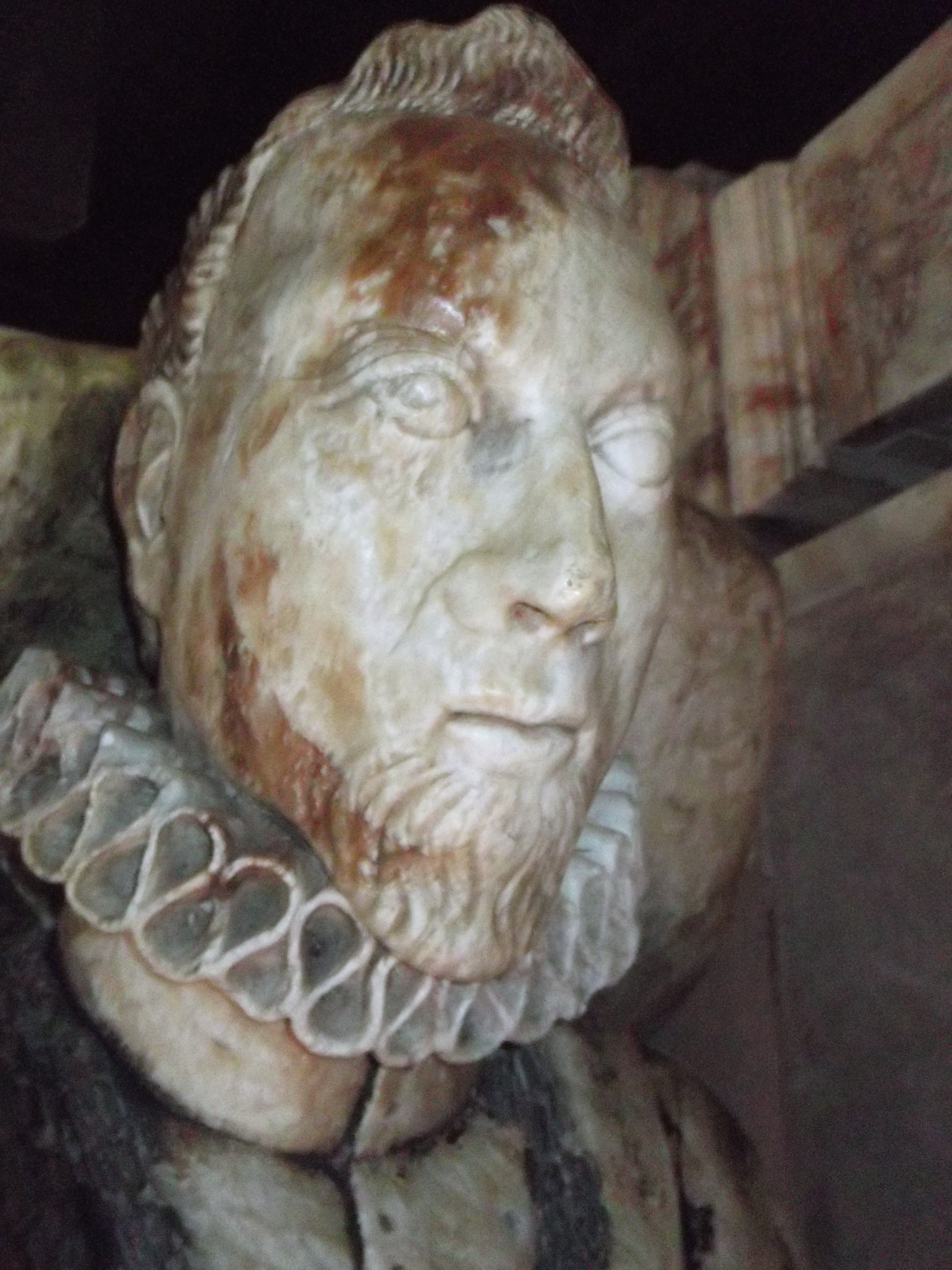
George Bromley, as depicted on his tomb in the church of St Peter the Apostle, Worfield, Shropshire. Newport supported the political career of Bromley, who was his wife's second cousin.

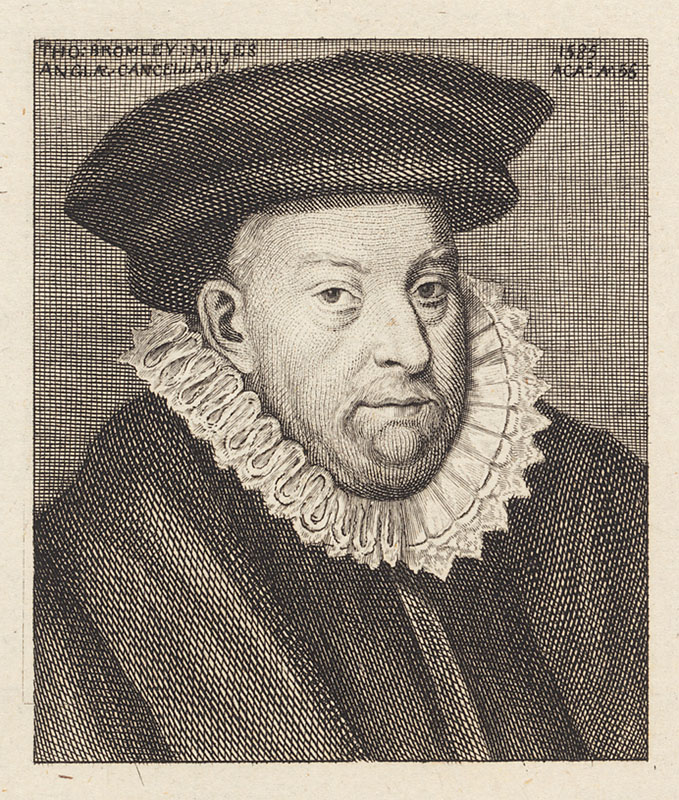
Sir Thomas Bromley, the future Lord Chancellor, was George Bromley's younger brother and a favourite of Chief Justice Thomas Bromley, who left a small annuity to aid his legal studies.

Newport seems to have accepted the political and religious twists and turns of the mid-Tudor period, and it is impossible to know with what reluctance. He did not sit in any of Mary I's parliaments. However, he was made a Justice of the Peace in 1554 and chosen as High Sheriff of Shropshire again in 1557. His father-in-law, Chief Justice Bromley, had died in 1555, giving Newport some access to his great wealth, so he was now one of the richest and most influential men in the county. However, there were plenty of Catholics to choose from, so he must have seemed trustworthy to the Catholic regime to be honoured and empowered with the shrievalty.

As sheriff, Newport was a contracting party or returning officer in not only the elections for the county constituency, but also the Shropshire borough seats. For the last parliament of the reign, which assembled in January 1558, he oversaw, and probably influenced, the return of his wife's second cousins, George Bromley at Much Wenlock, and Thomas Bromley, the future Lord Chancellor, at Bridgnorth. Both were members of the Inner Temple and favourites of the late chief justice. One of the county seats was taken by Newport's uncle, Richard Corbet. All three seem to have been Protestants by inclination, but not openly so at the time.

=== Elizabethan period ===
Newport was close to the end of his shrievalty when Mary died on 17 November 1558. Evidently he was in London at the time and travelled back to Shropshire to ensure Elizabeth I was properly acclaimed as queen. This he did at Much Wenlock on 25 November, although a public proclamation had actually already occurred on the day of Mary's death. Sir Thomas Botelar or Butler, the vicar of Much Wenlock, recorded in his parish register:

And upon St Catherines day, as Sir Thomas Botelar Vicar of this Church of the Holy Trinity of Moch Wenlock was going toward the Altar to celebration of the Mass, Mr. Richard Newport of High Ercal Esqr then being Sheriff of Salop, coming late from London, came unto me and bad me that I after the Offertorie should come down into the Body of the Church, and unto the people there being, should say these words in open audience and loud voice. Friends ye shall pray for the prosperous estate of our most noble Queen Elizabeth, by the Grace of God Queen of England France and Ireland, defender of the faith, and for this I desire you every man and woman to say that Pater Noster with ave Maria.

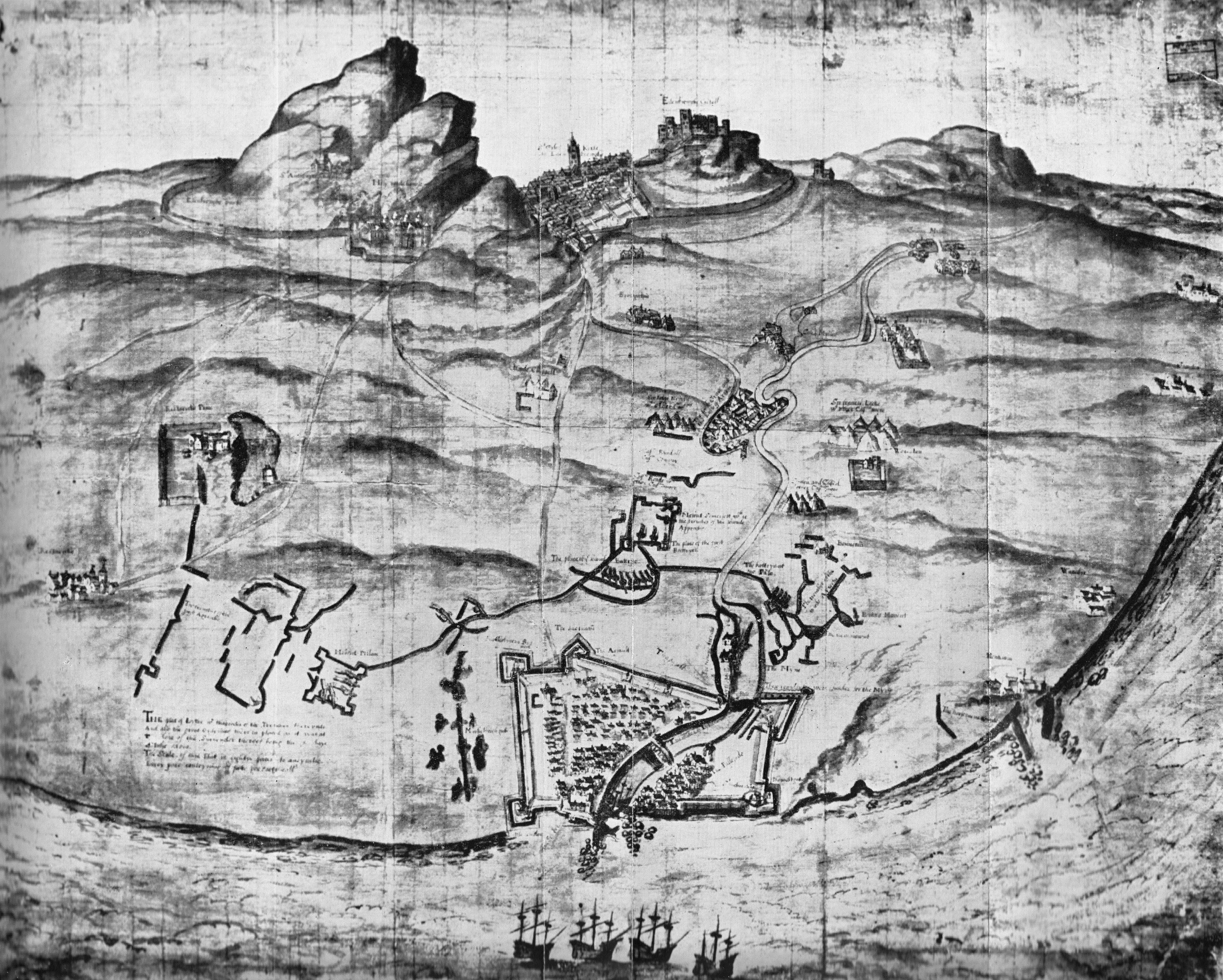
Newport served at the siege of Leith, here depicted on a contemporary map.

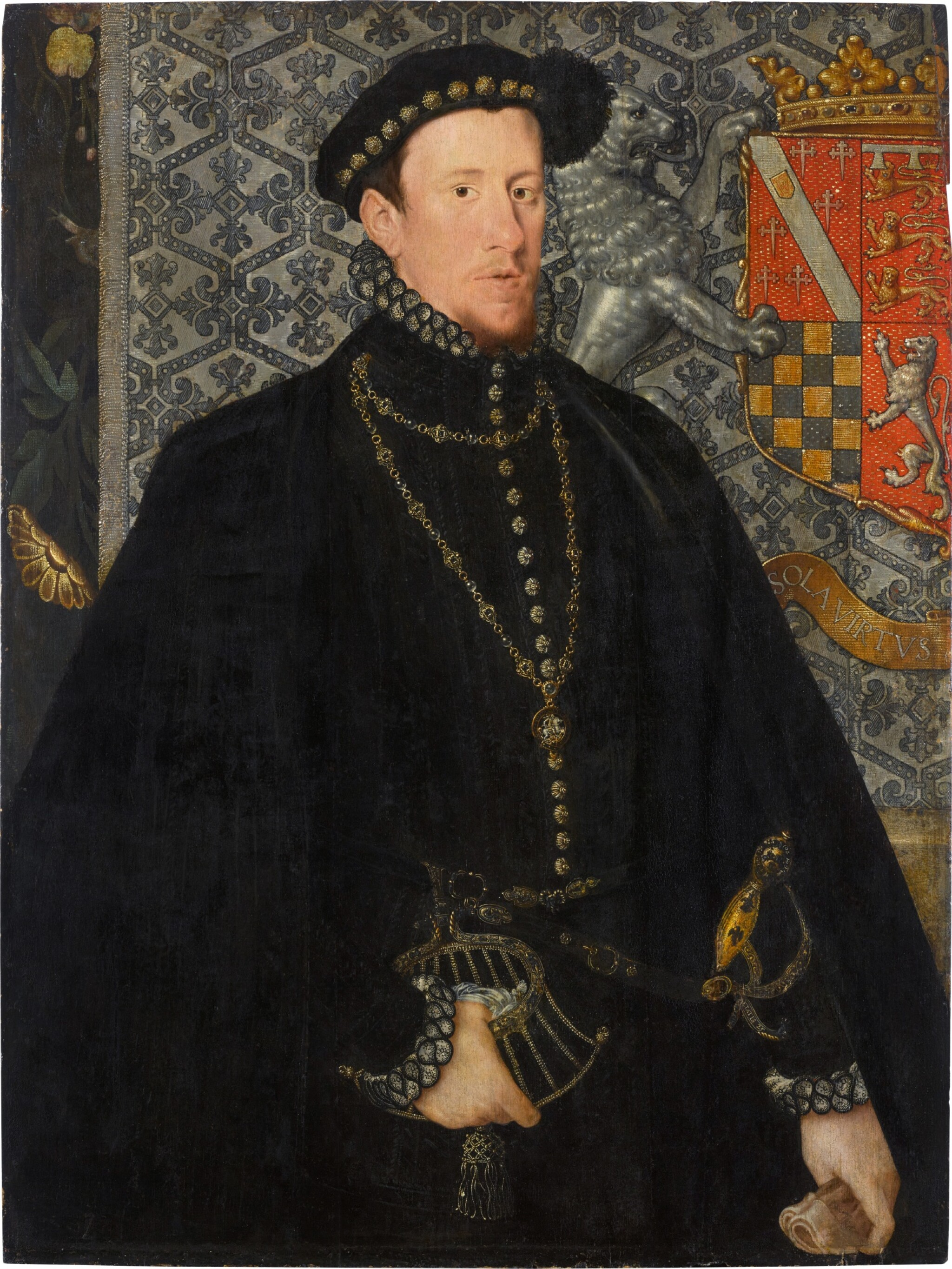
Thomas Howard, 4th Duke of Norfolk, who knighted Newport after the English intervention in support of the Scottish Reformation.

Having compelled the congregation to offer distinctively Catholic prayers for the Protestant queen, Newport then went out into the market square and ordered Elizabeth's accession to be proclaimed again. This very public show of support heralded a final decade of apparently whole-hearted support for the Elizabethan Religious Settlement. In 1560, Newport, now in his 50s, served in Scotland under William Grey, 13th Baron Grey de Wilton, taking part in the Siege of Leith. He was knighted by Thomas Howard, 4th Duke of Norfolk on 21 July at Berwick-upon-Tweed, as the army returned, after the Treaty of Edinburgh secured an end to French intervention in Scotland.

In 1564, when the bishops were ordered by the Privy Council to vet the local justices, Thomas Bentham, the Bishop of Coventry and Lichfield, consulted on the Shropshire bench with Newport, his cousin Andrew Corbet and George Leigh, the Bailiff of Shrewsbury. They were able to supply a list of those "meet to continue in office," including themselves and a number of relatives. Asked to for those who were learned in the law as well as reliable Protestants, they named Reginald Corbet and George Bromley.

As an entirely reliable regional supporter of the regime, it was inevitable that Newport would be appointed to the Council in the Marches of Wales, although the date of this is uncertain. He was also selected as sheriff of the county again for 1568-9, thus occupying the post under each of Henry VIII's children.

== Death ==
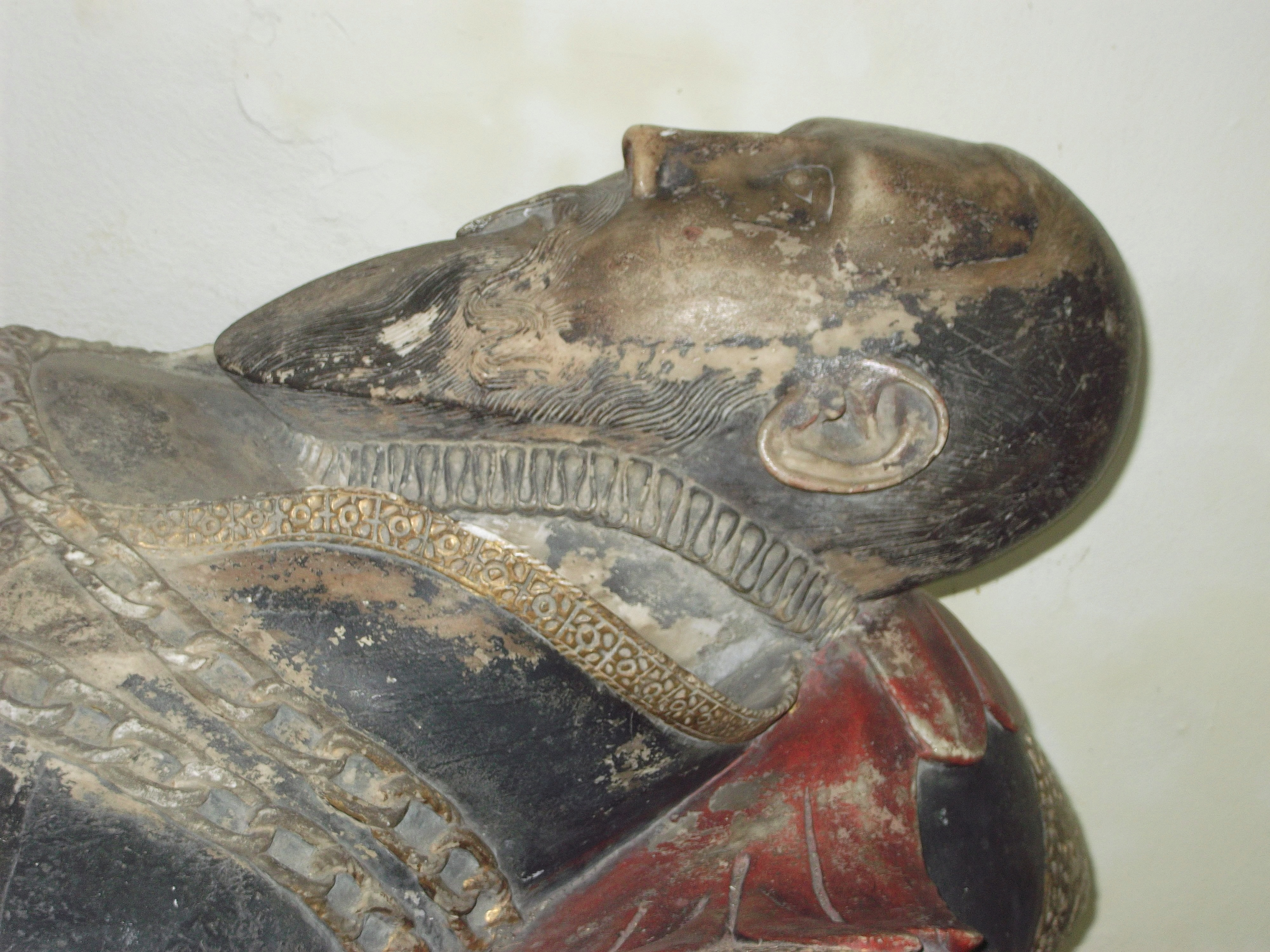
Effigy of Richard Newport on his tomb, St Andrew's church, Wroxeter, Shropshire.

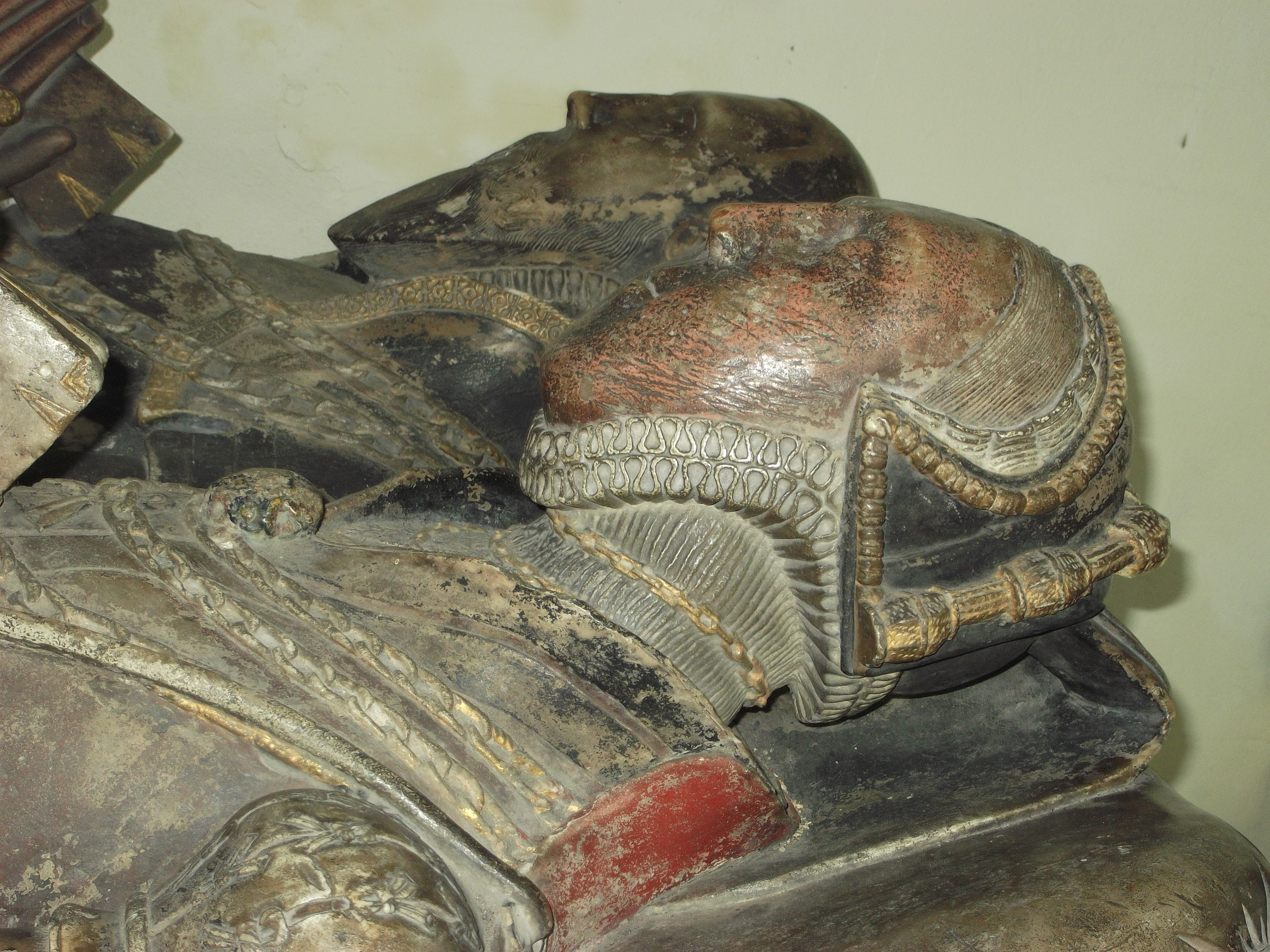
Effigies of Margaret Bromley and Richard Newport in Wroxeter parish church.

Newport made his will on 11 September 1570 and died the following day. Shrewsbury's chronicle, giving a different date, reported:

This yeare and the xviijth of September 1570 one Syr Rychard Newport a valiant knyght of Shropshire and of a pryncely personage dysceassyd for whose deathe there was mutche mone made in Shrosberye.

Newport's will begins with an exemplary Protestant declaration of faith:

First and principally, I yield up my soul into the merciful hands of God the Father, the Son, and the Holy Ghost, believing assuredly to be saved only through God’s mercy purchased for me by the death and bloodshedding of Jesus Christ, God and man, my only Saviour and Redeemer, & by no other means.

Newport named his widow and eldest son, Francis as executors, while George and Thomas Bromley, described as cousins, were made supervisors. Margaret Bromley was given considerable responsibility in meeting Newport's obligations to his children as, despite his great wealth, he did not have the spare money to meet the full costs of the daughter's marriages or the sons' educations. He was forced to assign a large part of his High Ercall estate to this purpose for eight years, charging Margaret Bromley with managing the lands appropriately. He was anxious that his daughters, Isabel and Elizabeth, already married, should have their marriage money available as soon as their fathers-in-law had arranged their jointures. He was very generous to all his servants, ordering that all should receive a whole year's pay in addition to any outstanding from the current year. Some were given considerably more, including Jockey, a servant who had returned with him from the Scottish campaign, who was to receive £13 6s. 8d., and Margaret Gibbons, his maid, who was allotted £6 13s. 4d. Cash sums were given to his brothers, brothers-in-law and sons. George Bromley was given first choice of his geldings and William Gratwood, who had married his daughter Mary, was to take the best of the remainder.

Newport asked to be buried in the parish church at Wroxeter, near the tomb of his wife's parents. This request was met. He was given a large altar tomb, on the south side of the chancel, with brilliantly coloured effigies of himself, in full Elizabethan armour, and his wife, Margaret.

== Marriage and family ==
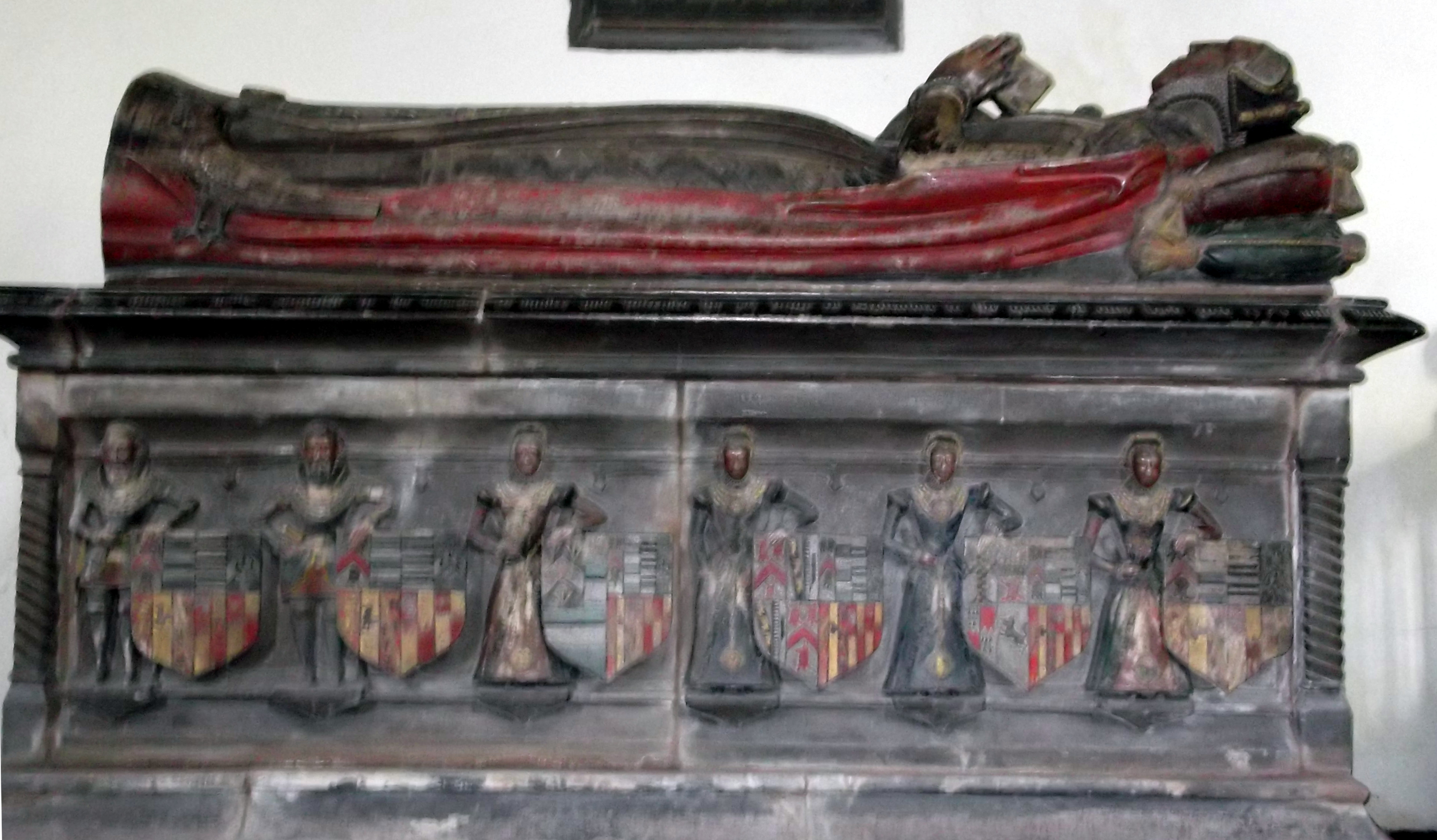
Tomb of Sir Richard Newport and Margaret Bromley, with depictions of six of their children.

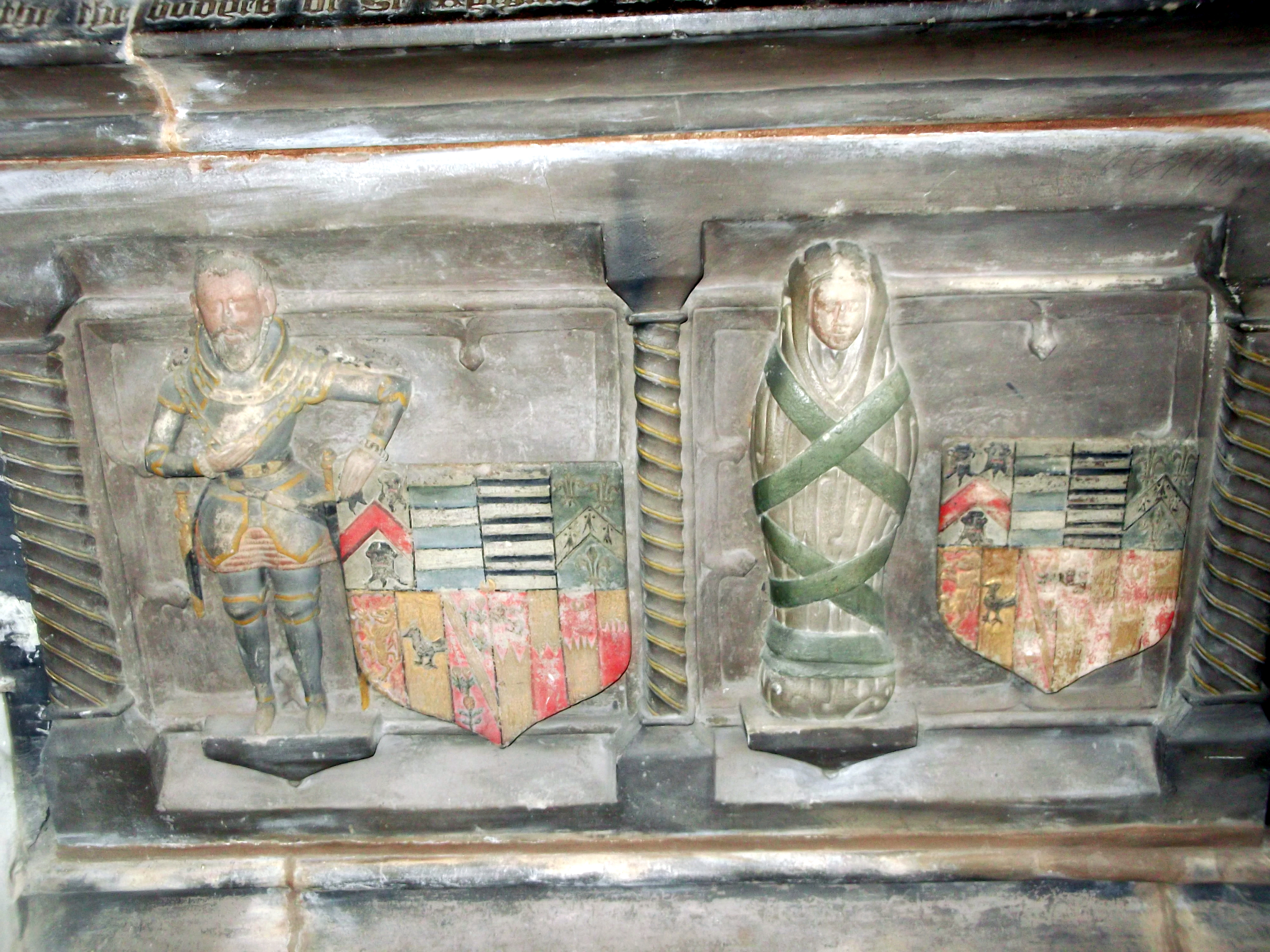
Two children of Margaret Bromley and Sir Richard Newport, depicted on the eastern end of their tomb. One is shrouded to represent an earlier death.

Newport's marriage to Margaret, the daughter and heiress of Sir Thomas Bromley of Eyton on Severn, Wroxeter, and Shrewsbury, produced at least the eight children who are depicted on their tomb. They had four sons, including the heir, Francis Newport (died 1623), and four daughters.

- Sir Francis Newport, the eldest son and heir, married Beatrix Lacon. Their son and heir was

Richard Newport, 1st Baron Newport, whose title was a reward from Charles I for his financial support at the beginning of the English Civil War. His heir was:

Francis Newport, 1st Earl of Bradford, an important regional supporter of Charles II but later a Whig who sought to exclude James II and was temporarily barred from public life himself.

- Andrew Newport, the fourth son, was MP for Shrewsbury
- Mary Newport, married William Gratwood or Gratewood, nephew of Rowland Hill, the first Protestant Lord Mayor of London. The entry for the Newports in the Visitation of Shropshire features Mary twice, initially as a sister of Sir Richard, and only afterwards as a daughter. Placing her as a sister of Sir Richard seems more plausible chronologically, but there is no mention of a daughter called Mary in the will of Thomas Newport. Richard Newport's will definitely names William Gratwood as a son-in-law, which seems conclusive, but oddly never mentions Mary as Gratwood's wife, although all the other daughters are named. This is probably because Mary was considerably older and her marriage was settled well before. Green names Ralph Sneyd, uncle of Elizabeth Trentham, Countess of Oxford, as her second husband. He was a Staffordshire landowner who was High Sheriff of the county twice.
- Isabel Newport married Sir Charles Foxe, whose father of the same name was a member of the Inner Temple, MP for Ludlow and Much Wenlock and secretary to the Council in the Marches. The son bitterly and unsuccessfully contested his father's will, which provided for an illegitimate son and children of his second marriage.
- Elizabeth Newport married in turn two cousins: Francis Lawley and Thomas Lawley. The first marriage produced the line of Lawley baronets.
- Magdelen Newport, married in turn Richard Herbert (d.1596) and Sir John Danvers (c.1585-1655), and was mother of the poet George Herbert. She was a friend of poets, including John Donne.

Margaret Bromley long survived her husband. Thomas Newport had arranged, as part of her jointure, for her to receive estates in Pembrokeshire and Worcestershire, as well as at Shifnal. Richard Newport had also bought for her land at Cound and Cressage for her from Sir John Lyttelton She died in 1598 and it was only at this point that her large estates were formally handed over to her son, Francis.

=== Family tree: descendants of Richard Newport ===
The main lines of descent from Richard Newport and Margaret Bromley are shown on the following family tree.

Descendants of Richard Newport

Based on the Newport pedigree in the Visitation of Shropshire, with details from History of Parliament Online.

Margaret Bromley	SIR RICHARD NEWPORT of High Ercall, MP for Shropshire
Francis Newport, MP for Shropshire	Beatrice Lacon of Willey, Shropshire	William Gratwood, heir of Rowland Hill	Mary Newport	Ralph Sneyd of Keele and Bradwell, High Sheriff of Staffordshire 1576, 1595	Sir Charles Foxe	Isabel Newport
Andrew Newport, MP for Shrewsbury	Francis Lawley of Spoonhill	Elizabeth Newport	Thomas Lawley (1547–1621) of Much Wenlock, MP for Much Wenlock	Richard Herbert (died 1596), MP for Montgomery Boroughs and Montgomeryshire	Magdalen Newport
Richard Newport, 1st Baron Newport (1587–1651), MP for Shropshire, prominent Royalist	Rachel Leveson, daughter of Sir John Leveson	Anne Manning, daughter and coheiress of John Manning of Hackney	Sir Thomas Lawley, 1st Baronet (died 1646), of London, Twickenham, and Spoonhill, MP for Much Wenlock	Sir Edward Lawley (1586–1623) of Much Wenlock and St. Giles-in-the-Fields, Middlesex, MP for Much Wenlock	George Herbert (1593–1633), poet and clergyman	Elizabeth Offley of Dalby, Leicestershire.	Henry Herbert (1595–1673), Master of the Revels
Andrew Newport (1622–99), MP for Montgomeryshire, Preston and Shrewsbury	Sir Francis Lawley, 2nd Baronet	Anne Whitmore, daughter of Sir Thomas Whitmore, 1st Baronet of Apley	Mary Herbert	Edward Herbert, 1st Baron Herbert of Cherbury (1582–1648), MP for Montgomeryshire and Merioneth
Francis Newport, 1st Earl of Bradford (1620–1708)	Diana Russell, daughter of Francis Russell, 4th Earl of Bedford	Beatrice Newport	Henry Bromley of Holt Castle	Barons Herbert of Chirbury, first creation	Barons Herbert of Chirbury, second creation
Earls of Bradford	Henry Bromley (1632–70) of Holt Castle, MP for Worcestershire	Lawley Baronets and Barons Wenlock
