= Magdalen Herbert =

English estate manager and patron (1561–1627)

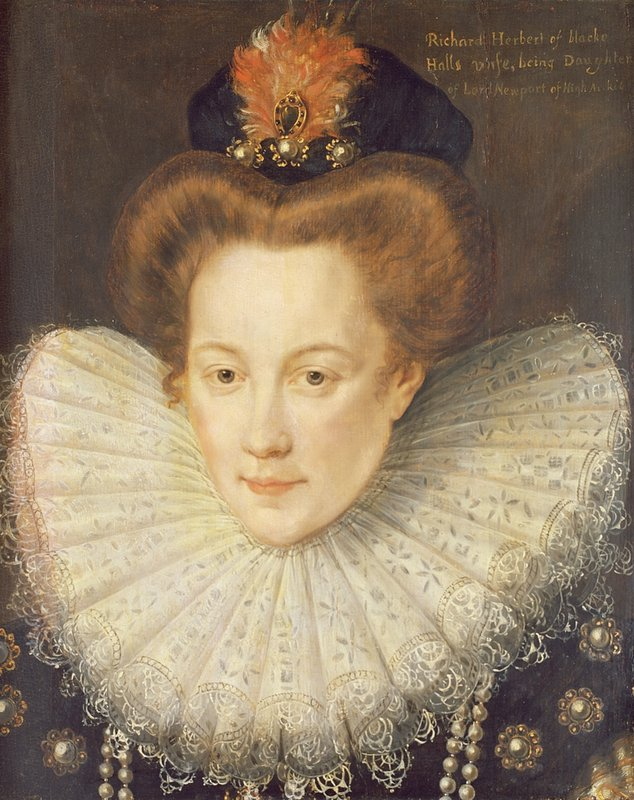
- Born: 1561; England
- Died: 1 July 1627 (aged 65–66) (burial)
- Children: 10

Magdalen Herbert born Magdalen Newport; Magdalen, Lady Danvers (1561 – buried 1 July 1627) was an English estate manager and patron. She was a patron to John Donne and the mother of poet George Herbert. She is seen as the head of an early English literary family.

== Life ==
She was born in 1561, she was the daughter of Sir Richard Newport of High Ercall, Shropshire. Her maternal grandfather Sir Thomas Bromley was the executor of Henry VIII.

She married Richard Herbert, Lord of Cherbury at her family home in Eyton on Severn near Wroxeter, Shropshire, in 1581. He was the eldest son of Edward Herbert who was a member of a collateral branch of the family of the Earls of Pembroke.

Their eldest son, Edward Herbert, 1st Baron Herbert of Cherbury was born on 3 March 1583 at Eyton on Severn. Subsequent children were Elizabeth, Margaret, Richard, William, Charles, the poet George Herbert (born 3 April 1593), Henry (born 1594), Frances, and Thomas (born posthumously 1597). By 1593 they had moved to Black Hall, a large, low house in a valley overlooked by Montgomery Castle. Magdalen is seen as the head of an early English literary family.

Her husband died in 1596 and for the next thirteen years she was the estate manager.

She had a tomb erected in Montgomery church, where her husband was buried, in 1600. The tomb has effigies of Richard and herself and it includes maquettes of eight of their children. Her husband's heraldic symbols and his armour are included but his wife's heraldry and her dress are also on prominent display. The tomb also includes a cadaver to show that death happens and a painting of a naked woman and the figure of Time are also included in the design.

After her husband's death she had a close (possibly passionate) relationship with the poet John Donne which lasted up to her death. Donne wrote a poem, "Ascension: To the Lady Magdalen Herbert", addressed to her.

In about March 1609 she remarried to the much younger Sir John Danvers (c.1585-1655) of Dauntsey, Wiltshire, and Chelsea, London. They had no children in their marriage.

She managed her own death. Her funeral took place at Chelsea Old Church on 1 July 1627 and John Donne, by then ordained and Dean of St Paul's Cathedral, made the funeral oration.

Danvers, a politician who later became known as one of the signatories of the death warrant of King Charles I, survived Magdalen and, after remarrying and having a family, died in 1655.
