= Thomas Herbert (seaman) =

Welsh seaman and author

Thomas Herbert (15 May 1597 – 1642?) was a Welsh seaman and writer.

== Biography ==
Herbert was the sixth and posthumous son of Richard Herbert and his mother Magdalen, daughter of Sir Richard Newport, and brother of Edward Herbert, 1st Baron Herbert of Cherbury and poet George Herbert. He was born at Montgomery Castle on 15 May 1597.

He served as page to Sir Edward Cecil in Germany, and distinguished himself by his gallantry at the siege of Juliers in 1610, when aged 13. In 1616 he took service under Captain Benjamin Joseph, commander of Globe, East Indiaman. When Joseph was killed in an engagement with a Portuguese carrack, Herbert assumed the command, and eventually beat off and disabled the enemy. He pursued his voyage to Surat, arriving there in March 1617. Thence he went up the country to Mandow (Mandu), where the great mogul kept his court. He returned in the autumn to Surat, and to England next year.

Herbert served under Sir Robert Mansell, in the expedition to Algiers (1620–1621), and commanded the ship which brought Prince Charles home from Spain in October 1623. He also carried Count Mansfeld from Dover to Flushing on his expedition for the recovery of the Palatinate, January 1624 – 1625, when he lost the ship near the Dutch coast, but got Mansfeld ashore in the long-boat.

Herbert was appointed to the command of HMS Dreadnought, 25 September 1625. From that date he had no promotion, and thinking himself ill-used, "retired", says his brother, "to a private and melancholy life, being much discontented to find others preferred to him; in which sullen humour having lived many years, he died and was buried in London in St. Martin's, near Charing Cross". The registers at St. Martin's contain no record of his death.

== Bibliography ==
Herbert is probably the author of the following:

- Stripping, Whipping, and Pumping; or, the Five Mad Shavers of Drury Lane, London, 1638, 8vo.
- Keep within compasse Dick and Robin, There's no harm in all this, or a merry dialogue between two or three merry cobblers, with divers songs full of Mirth and Newes, 1641, 12mo.
- An Elegie upon the Death of Thomas Earle of Strafford, Lord Lievtenant of Ireland (heroic couplet), London, 1641, 4to.
- Newes newly discovered in a pleasant dialogue betwixt Papa the false pope and Benedict an honest fryer, shewing the merry conceits which the friers have in their Cloysters amongst handsome nuns, and how the pope complains for want of that pastime; with the many shifts of his friends in England, London, 1641, 12mo.
- An answer to the most envious, scandalous, and libellous Pamphlet, entituled Mercuries Message: or the copy of a Letter sent to William Laud, Archbishop of Canterbury, now prisoner in the Tower(heroic couplet), London, 1641, 4to.
- A Reply in the Defence of the Oxford Petition, with a declaration of the Academians teares for the decay of learning, or the Universities feares: also the description of a Revd. Coachman which preached before a company of Brownists, London, 1641, 4to.
- Vox Secunda Populi. Or the Commons Gratitude to the most Honourable Philip, Earle of Pembroke and Montgomery, for the great affection which hee alwaies bore unto them, London, 1641, 4to, with verses by Thomas Cartwright appended in some copies.
- Newes out of Islington; or a Dialogue very merry and pleasant between a knavish Projector and honest Clod the Ploughman, with certaine songs, London, 1641, 12mo, reprinted by J. O. Halliwell in Contributions to Early English Literature, London, 1849, 4to.
