= Andrew Newport (MP, died 1611) =

English politician

Andrew Newport (born 1563; buried 5 April 1611) was an English politician.

Newport was the fourth but second surviving son of Sir Richard Newport (died 1570) of High Ercall, Shropshire, and his wife Margaret, daughter and heiress of Sir Thomas Bromley. His eldest brother was Sir Francis Newport (died 1623), and through his sister Magdalene he became uncle of Edward Herbert, 1st Baron Herbert of Cherbury and poet George Herbert.

He was educated at Shrewsbury School, which he entered in 1574. He studied law at the Inner Temple and was called to the bar in 1581.

He was a Member (MP) of the Parliament of England for Shrewsbury in 1589.

After serving in parliament he sat as a member of the Council of Wales and the Marches in 1601.

He died unmarried in 1611 and was buried at Wroxeter, Shropshire, on 5 April that year. His epitaph, giving his age as 48, stated to have been composed 'nearly at the hour of death', proclaims strong Puritan sentiments, describing him as ever hating and detesting the imposture and abominations of the Church of Rome as it now standeth.
