= John Danvers =

English courtier and politician

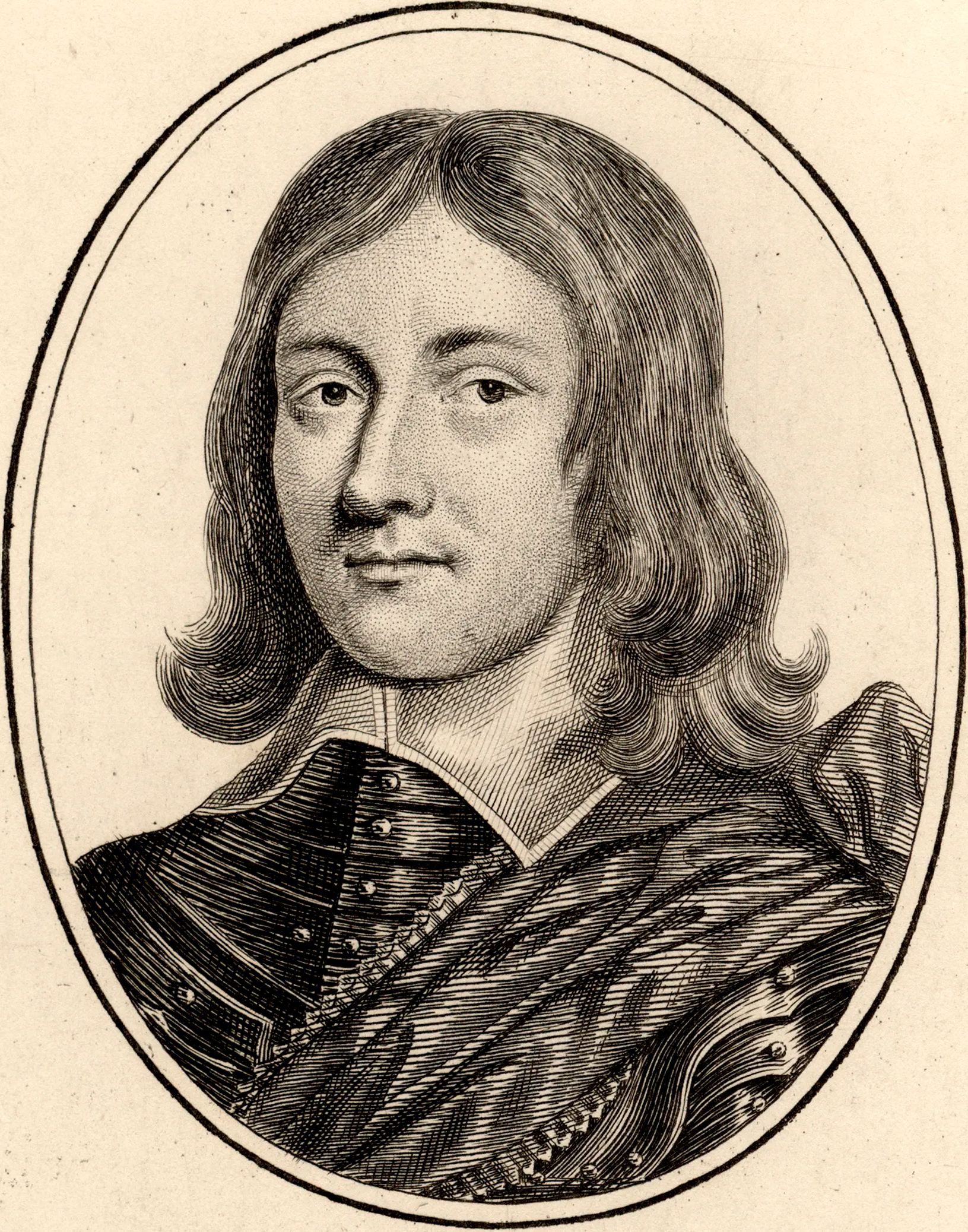
Engraving published by John Thane, after a contemporary portrait

Sir John Danvers (c. 1585–buried 28 April 1655) was an English courtier and politician who was one of the signatories of the death warrant of Charles I.

== Life ==
Danvers was the third and youngest son of Sir John Danvers of Dauntsey, Wiltshire, by Elizabeth Neville. In his youth, he travelled through France and Italy, developing sophisticated tastes in gardening and architecture, which in later life he indulged at his house in Chelsea. In 1597 he entered the University of Padua as a student, prior to returning to England where he carried on his education at Winchester College (entered 1598), Brasenose College, Oxford (entered 1601) and Lincoln's Inn where he was a law student in 1612. Danvers was knighted by James I of England on 3 March 1609; and under Charles I became a gentleman of the privy chamber.

He sat as a member of parliament for Arundel in 1610, Montgomery Boroughs in the Addled Parliament of 1614, Oxford University in 1621, Newport (Isle of Wight) in 1624 and again for Oxford University from 1625 to 1629.

Danvers was engaged in mercantile transactions, and in 1624 he learned that the government were contemplating a seizure of the papers of the Virginia Company. With the aid of Edward Collingwood, the secretary, he had the whole of the records copied out and entrusted them to the care of Henry Wriothesley, 3rd Earl of Southampton, a family friend, who deposited them at his house at Titchfield, Hampshire.

Danvers fell into debt, and from 1630 to 1640 was apparently struggling with creditors. About 1640 he began an active political career in opposition to the king. He refused to contribute to the expenses of the king's expedition to Scotland in 1639, and was returned to the Short Parliament of 1640 by Oxford University. In 1642 he took up arms for the parliament, and was granted a colonel's commission which he held in command of the Wiltshire foot militia until 1650, but he did not play a prominent part in military affairs. He gives an account of the opening incidents of the war in letters written to friends from Chelsea in July and August 1642.

Danvers was ordered by the parliament to receive the Dutch ambassadors late in 1644, and on 10 October 1645 was returned to the house as member for Malmesbury in the place of Anthony Hungerford, disabled to sit. He took little part in the proceedings of the house, but was appointed a member of the commission nominated to try the king in January 1649. He was only twice absent from the meetings of the commission, and signed the death-warrant. In February of the same year Danvers was given a seat on the council of state, which he retained till the council's dissolution in 1653. He died at his house at Chelsea in April 1655, and was buried at Dauntsey. His name was in the Act of Attainder passed at the Restoration.

== Gardener ==
At a young age Danvers acquired a fine garden and house at Chelsea: the latter he furnished sumptuously and curiously, and the former he laid out after the Italian manner. ' 'Twas Sir John Danvers of Chelsey,' John Aubrey writes, 'who first taught us the way of Italian gardens.' His house, called Danvers House, adjoined the mansion, once the home of Sir Thomas More, which was known in the seventeenth century as Buckingham and also as Beaufort House. Danvers House was pulled down in 1696 to make room for Danvers Street, thereafter named after him.

Through his second marriage he came into possession of the estate of Lavington, Wiltshire, where he elaborately laid out gardens.

== Marriages and family ==
In about March 1609 he married Magdalen Herbert (née Newport), widow of Richard Herbert, and mother of ten children, including George Herbert the poet, and Edward, Lord Herbert of Cherbury. She died in 1627.

On 10 July 1628, a year after the death of his first wife, Danvers, then reportedly aged 40, married Elizabeth, daughter of the late Ambrose Dauntsey, and granddaughter of Sir John Dauntsey. His second wife died on 9 July 1636.

His children by his second wife consisted of Henry (b. 5 December 1633), who inherited much of his uncle Henry's property, and died before his father in November 1654, when Thomas Fuller is stated to have preached the funeral sermon; Charles, who died in infancy; Elizabeth (b. 1 May 1629), who married Robert Danvers, self-styled Viscount Purbeck; and Mary, who died in infancy.

Danvers married a third time at Chelsea, on 6 January 1649, his wife being Grace Hewes, daughter of Thomas Hewes of Kemerton, Gloucestershire, and he had by her a son, John (b. 10 August 1650). Grace survived her husband and died in 1678; she was buried at Isleworth (Middlesex), where she has a memorial inscription, and left an informative will.

Danvers' elder brothers were Charles Danvers and Henry Danvers. His brother Henry, who became Lord Danby, was a royalist, and died early in 1644; he left his property to his sister Lady Catherine Gargrave, wife of Sir Richard Gargrave, High Sheriff of Yorkshire. Still in pecuniary difficulties, Danvers resisted this disposition of his brother's property, and his influence with the parliamentary majority led the House of Commons to pass a resolution declaring that he had been deprived of his brother's estate 'for his affection and adhering to the parliament' (14 June 1644), and that Danvers's eldest son Henry was entitled to the property. The son Henry bequeathed the estate in his power to his sister Ann, who married Sir Henry Lee 3rd Baronet of the Lee Baronets of Ditchley in 1655, and had a daughter, Eleanor, who became the wife of James Bertie, 1st Earl of Abingdon. Lord Abingdon thus ultimately came into possession of the property at Chelsea.
