= Francis Newport (died 1623) =

English politician

Sir Francis Newport (ca. 1555 – 6 March 1623) was an English politician.

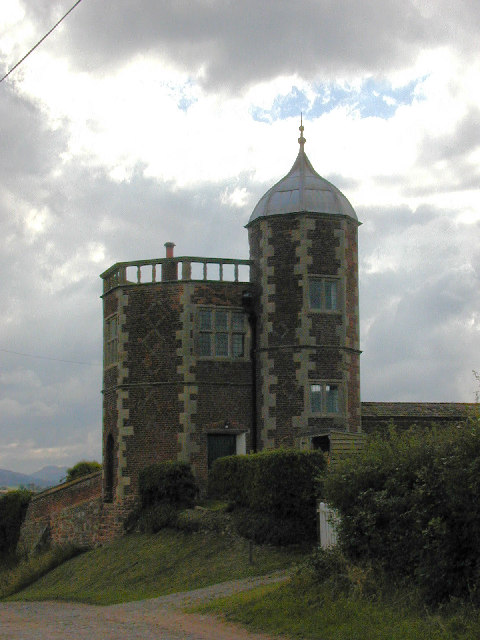
Tower of Eyton-on-Severn Hall

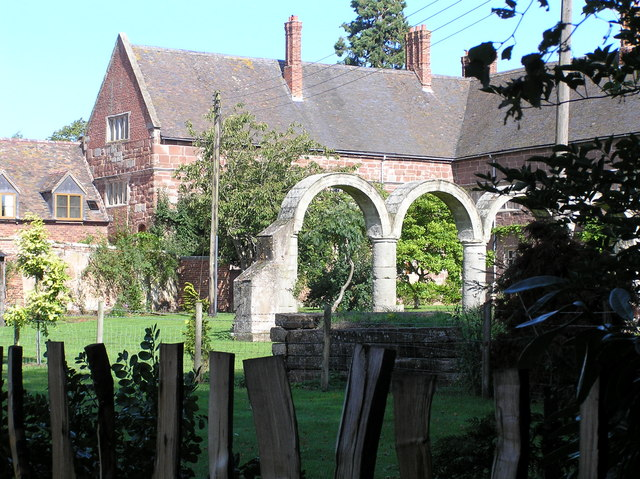
High Ercall Hall

Francis was born the eldest son of Sir Richard Newport and the brother of Andrew. He was educated at Shrewsbury School (1569–1571) and Magdalen College, Oxford (1574) and studied law at the Inner Temple in 1577. He succeeded his father in 1570 and was knighted in 1603.

He was appointed a Justice of the Peace (J.P.) for Shropshire from c. 1582, sheriff for 1586–1587 and 1601–1602, and a Deputy Lieutenant of the county in 1590. He was a member of the Council of the Marches of Wales in 1601.

He commissioned the rebuilding of his two country houses, Eyton-on-Severn Hall (completed 1595) and High Ercall Hall (completed 1608). Newport employed a stonemason called Walter Hancock, and in November 1595 he wrote from High Ercall to the town council of Shrewsbury, recommending Hancock be employed to build a new market hall.

He was elected a member (MP) of the parliament of England for Shropshire in 1593.

He married Beatrice, the daughter of Roland Lacon of Willey and had with her three sons and four daughters. His son Richard was elevated to the Peerage as the first Baron Newport.
