= Mid-Tudor Crisis =

The Mid-Tudor Crisis denotes the period of English history between 1547 (the death of Henry VIII) and 1558 (the death of Mary Tudor), when, it has been argued by Whitney Jones and others, English government and society were in imminent danger of collapse in the face of a combination of weak rulers, economic pressures, a series of rebellions, and religious upheaval in the wake of the English Reformation, among other factors.The term 'Mid-Tudor Crisis' was first introduced by historian Whitney Jones in The Mid-Tudor Crisis 1539–1563 (1973), who argued that weak rulers, economic hardship, rebellions, and religious upheaval posed an existential threat to Tudor government.

Recently, historians such as David Loades have disputed the underlying assumptions of the thesis and have argued that this period was actually one of success and even outright achievements.However, more recent scholarship—including David Loades—has questioned whether the period was truly a crisis, instead suggesting that it featured considerable administrative and religious successes.

== 'Mid-Tudor Crisis' thesis ==
Whilst it had always been implicit in the works of historians such as Albert Pollard and Stanley Bindoff that England faced a crisis between 1539 and 1563, Whitney Jones was the first historian to present a systematic analysis of the state of the country's government and society in these years. In The Mid-Tudor Crisis 1539-1563 (1973), he argues that eight factors combined to create a crisis in mid-Tudor England:

- Weak rulers

Edward VI has been portrayed as a stupid boy who, throughout his reign, was the pawn of two 'regents', Edward Seymour, 1st Duke of Somerset, and John Dudley, 1st Duke of Northumberland. While Somerset genuinely cared about the plight of the commons (hence his moniker of 'The Good Duke') and ruled with conscience, he was a poor practical politician, and his hesitancy and policies are held to be a primary cause of the 1549 Rebellions. Northumberland was somewhat more effective as a politician, but was morally bankrupt, ruling solely in the interests of the landed elite. However this is only one view, another being that it was Somerset who was the more morally bankrupt of the two, continuing the scheme of debasement to the nation's silver coinage, thus ensuring that there was a massive decline in the confidence of trade in England and abroad and contributing to inflation. In the four years after 1547 the crown made more than half a million pounds through this method. Yet despite its consequences Somerset continued. Upon Edward VI's death and the failure of Northumberland's attempt to install Lady Jane Grey as his successor, Mary Tudor became Queen Mary I of England. She was, according to traditionalists, an intolerant, dogmatic and neurotic woman who failed to produce an heir and ruled through blunt doctrinairism, her religious persecution earning her the nickname of 'Bloody Mary'.

- Economic dislocation

The mid-sixteenth century is generally regarded by historians to have been a period of intense flux and instability, resulting in deteriorating conditions for the commons. The Phelps Brown price index, a measure of relative price of a basket of goods for the average member of the commons, shows a rise from 100, the base figure, in the period 1541-75, to 193 in 1598 and 216 in 1613. Real wages fell by as much as 60% in this period, a fact that is particularly striking given that around 80% of the average worker's wages were spent on food during this time. Government reliance on debasement of the coinage to pay for expensive follies abroad is seen as an important factor behind the economic dislocation, but, more fundamentally, the population rise seen in this period is held to be its main cause.

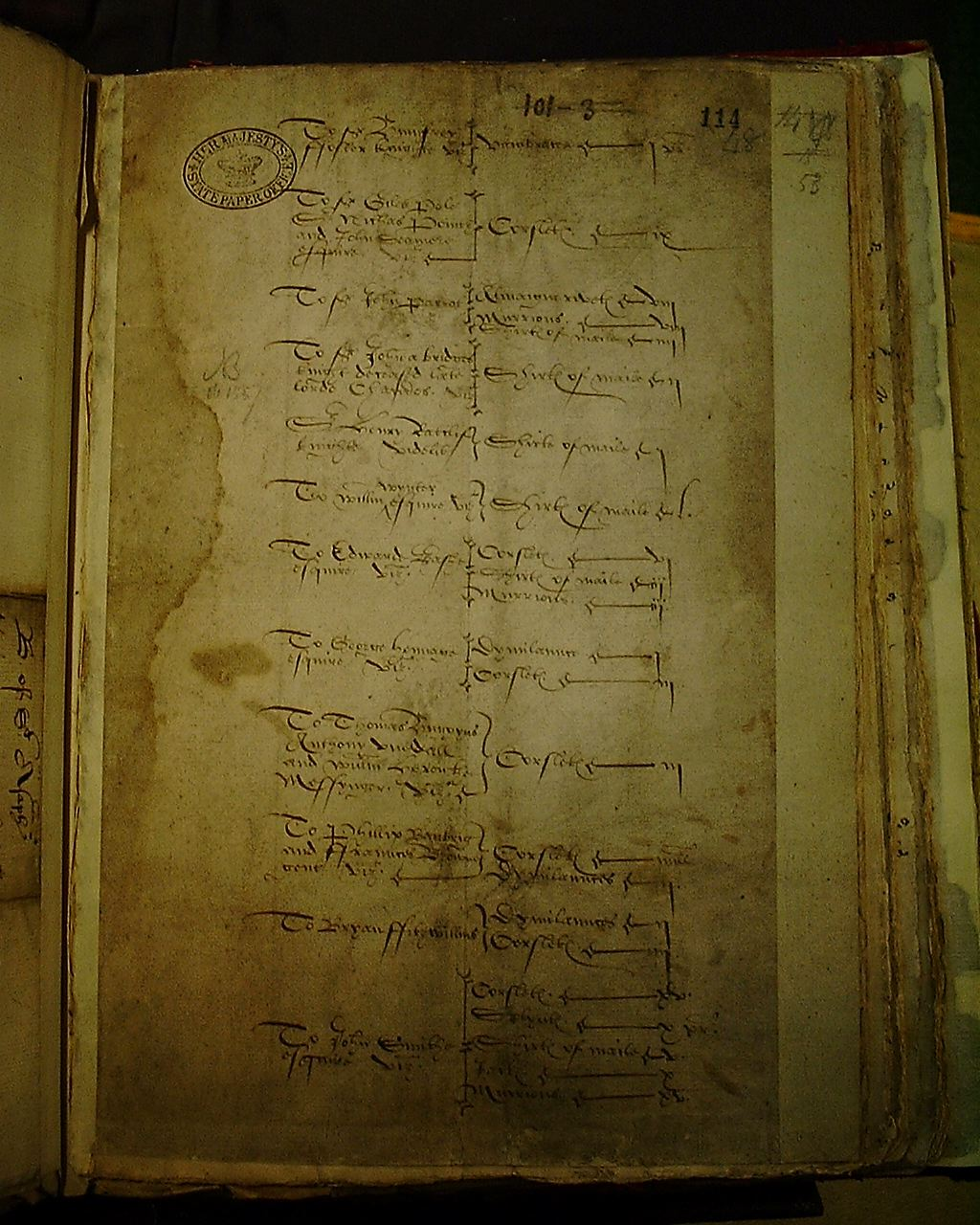
- A list of arms issued during Wyatt's rebellion of 1554
  Rebellions

In 1549 there were two major rebellions. The first, the Western Rebellion (also called the Prayer Book rebellion), was based upon Somerset's religious reforms and had conservative religious demands. The second, Kett's Rebellion, had Protestant elements, but actually centred largely around economic concerns. There was also a rebellion during Mary's reign - Wyatt's Rebellion of 1554 - the leaders of which managed to reach Charing Cross and Ludgate in London before their resolve finally weakened.

- Faction fighting

This period is held to be one of intense faction fighting at court. The fall of Cromwell precipitated a polemical battle between the conservative camp, led by the Duke of Norfolk and Stephen Gardiner, and the radicals, led by the Duke of Somerset and Katherine Parr. Faction fighting enabled both the rise and the fall of Somerset.

- Foreign policy failures

Somerset pursued an expensive and disastrous war with France and Scotland; see Rough Wooing (1543-1551), which, although ended by Northumberland, saw the loss of Boulogne after the Sieges of Boulogne (1544–1546); Boulogne having been again occupied by England from 1544 to 1550. It also contributed to the economic dislocation witnessed in this period and caused social instability at home. Mary's entering of a war with France in alliance with her new husband, Philip II of Spain, led to the loss of Calais; see Siege of Calais (1558). The Pilgrimage of Grace (1536–37), though predating Mary’s reign, is often referenced as a symptom of mid-Tudor unrest and has been analyzed by historians such as R. W. Hoyle and M. L. Bush.

- Local grievances

A vacuum of power in local politics allowed local grievances to grow unchecked. For example, complaints about local saffron farming rights and the release of local pamphleteers featured prominently in the demands of Kett's rebels.

- Intense religious upheaval

The turmoil of the English Reformation continued unabated in this period as England vacillated between the moderate reformism of Somerset, the radicalism of Northumberland, and the arid conservatism of Mary. The religious upheaval destabilised the roots of society and contributed to the rebellions witnessed in this period.

- Succession crisis

Edward VI's age and poor health combined with Mary's Catholicism to present a crisis in the Tudor succession itself, manifested in the fleeting attempt of Northumberland to install Lady Jane Grey as Edward VI's successor.

== Revisionist counter-interpretation ==
In recent decades revisionist historians, most notably David Loades, have proposed a new interpretation which almost completely reverses the traditional mid-Tudor crisis thesis:

- Definition of 'crisis'

The crux of their argument focuses around the definition of the word 'crisis'. They argue that for England to be in a state of crisis, the essential machinery of the state (the Privy Council, Justices of the Peace, revenue courts and Parliament) would have to be in imminent danger of collapse. In fact, they argue, the state machinery survived intact.

- Strength of central authority

The failure of the 'coups' of Somerset and Northumberland demonstrates that the state and the institution of the monarchy were strong enough to survive short-time political drama. The danger posed by factions is also limited, since disputes rarely spilled out of the Council itself and destabilised government or society at large.

- Continuity within the period

Central government was further strengthened by continuity within the period, as key personnel, including Thomas Gresham, William Paget, William Herbert and William Cecil, remained in office throughout.

- Continuity and comparison with other periods

Firstly, elements of continuity with other periods limit the extent to which the mid-Tudor years are in any way unique. The religious and economic strife of the period had deeper roots than traditionalists have suggested, and are in no way particular to this period. Furthermore, when this period is compared with other periods the scale of the problems faced seems limited. The cloth crisis of 1551/2, for example, was dwarfed by the agrarian crisis of 1596-8. The Pilgrimage of Grace of 1536 was far more serious than the rebellions of 1549 (the Western Rebellion and Kett's Rebellion) and 1554 (Wyatt's Rebellion). Lastly, the Spanish Armada posed a greater threat than the French and Scottish wars of this period.

- Scale of the problems faced

Not only should the problems be put in the context of those faced in conterminous periods, but even in their own right they did not pose a great threat to the safety of the state. The scale of two problems in particular must be re-examined:

  - Economy
  While the Phelps Brown and other price indexes suggest a severe deterioration in the state of the economy, they only consider the fortunes of agriculture (despite this period being notable as the beginnings of industrialisation in England), they ignore the fact that wages were often received in kind, and they ignore the decline in the number of holidays as a result of the introduction of Protestantism and its abhorrence for the veneration of saints. Thus, while statistically the economy may have been struggling, the lives of ordinary English citizens were not as adversely affected as might seem.
  - Rebellions
  The inherently conservative nature of all three rebellions, but particularly those of 1549, is emphasised, as is their protagonists' focus on local issues and avowed subservience to Edward VI (cries of "God Save the King" were heard among the Kett rebels in August 1549). The class antagonisms underlying the rebellions are considered to be exaggerated, and, in any case, what antagonisms existed merely weakened the rebellions. On a practical level, the rebellions were marred by chaos and blunder. They never, then, in any way directly challenged the state.
- Achievements and strengths of the rulers

It cannot be denied that Edward VI was a relatively weak monarch, but the consequence of this weakness was that during his reign England was effectively ruled by Somerset and Northumberland, and both these men were not as ineffective as was once held to be the case; in particular, Northumberland provided effective rule given the context in which he operated. Mary's failures were by no means inevitable, reflecting bad luck and a lack of time rather than an inherent weakness as a monarch. The fact that there were no civil wars during this period, that Parliament survived, that England remained independent, and that important reforms in finance and administration were undertaken which laid the basis for the late Tudor state, suggests that the rulers of this period provided reasonably effective rule.

== Post-revisionist perspective ==
In an article written for History Review, John Matusiak, specialist in the mid-Tudor period, opened a new chapter in the debate by arguing that both traditionalist and revisionist historians have been prone to oversimplifying their arguments, and that neither side paints an accurate picture of the mid-Tudor years, which he terms "Years of Trauma and Survival". The four main aspects of his argument are:

- There was no crisis

Revisionists historians are right to challenge this aspect of the traditional view of this period.

- Reappraisal of the scale of failure

None of the three rulers were as weak as the traditionalists have argued. However, they were certainly in no way exceptional, and the state survived despite, not because of, their efforts.

- Reappraisal of the scale of the problems faced

Revisionists have gone too far in downplaying the problems faced in this period, in several key areas:

  - Economy
  England was facing severe economic hardship. Even accepting the mitigating factors offered by the revisionists, the "big fact" is that 80% of wages were spent on food during this time, but that those wages were 60% less in 1559 than 50 years earlier. Compounded with consecutive harvest failures following heavy rains in 1556 and 1557, and an outbreak of sweating sickness in 1551 and 1552, the commons were facing a traumatic situation. The epidemics of 1556 and 1558 reduced the population by 200,000 (6%), with the death rate at twice its normal level.
  - Religion
  This period was one of constant religious uncertainty, with England vacillating between moderate and radical Protestantism and reactionary Catholicism within the space of two decades.
  - Foreign policy failures
  The loss of Calais and Bolougne in particular damaged English nationalism and contrast with the relatively successful ventures of Henry VIII.
  - Dissolution of Parliament
  The fact that Parliament had to be dissolved in 1549, 1550, 1552 and 1553 demonstrates the instability faced at the upper echelons of government.
- Comparison with other periods

While the problems listed above were by no means unique in the Tudor period, the conjuncture of all of them within the space of 25 years was unique, and made the period particularly volatile.

Matusiak concludes by stating that "while there was no apocalypse in mid-Tudor England, there were many who sensed keenly enough the passing of the four horsemen". He argues that this period was no crisis because the essential state machinery was not under threat, but that it was a time of trauma during which the state's efforts were focused on survival rather than achievement.

Robert Bucholz and Newton Key point out that Henry VIII had not left the kingdom in very good financial shape for his children, and this contributed to their ability to effectively rule during this “Mid-Tudor Crisis”. They also state that England’s population dramatically increased from 2.4 million people in 1525, to about 4.5 million people in 1600, with an English economy that was not flexible enough to adjust to this population increase. The lack of flexibility in the English economy is not an issue where they cite blame to the monarchy for better addressing. Furthermore, they state that if Mary had had a longer reign, she may have contributed to having England turn back towards Catholicism. They also give her credit for being the first English queen regnant, proving that a woman could rule.
