= Eyton on Severn =

Village in Shropshire, England

Coordinates: 52.652°N 2.632°W

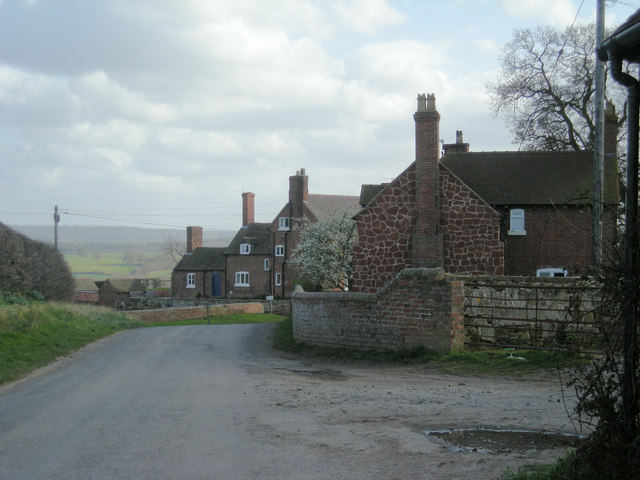
- Eyton-on-Severn

- Location within Shropshire
- OS grid reference: SJ572062
- Civil parish: Wroxeter and Uppington
- Unitary authority: Shropshire
- Ceremonial county: Shropshire
- Region: West Midlands
- Country: England
- Sovereign state: United Kingdom
- Post town: SHREWSBURY
- Postcode district: SY5
- Dialling code: 01952
- Police: West Mercia
- Fire: Shropshire
- Ambulance: West Midlands
- UK Parliament: Shrewsbury and Atcham

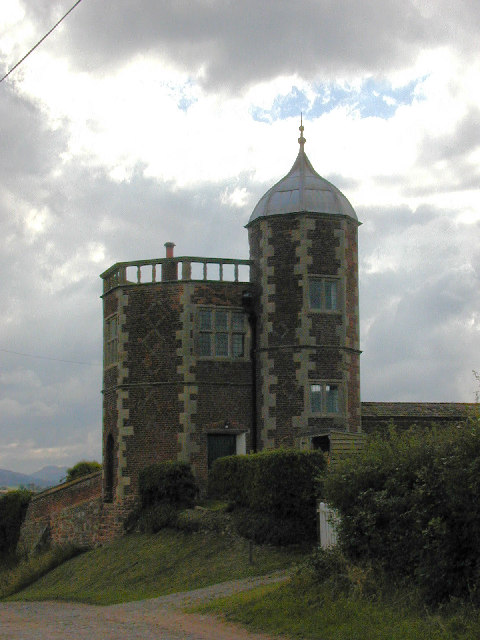
The octagonal tower

Eyton on Severn (pronounced: Eye-ton on Severn) is a small village in the English county of Shropshire, east of Shrewsbury. It is located on a ridge above the northern bank of the River Severn. The significant tributary of the Cound Brook joins the Severn at Eyton, albeit on the opposite bank. Wroxeter, the village located at a ruined Roman city, is only a mile north-west of the village. The hamlet of Dryton is just east of Eyton. All lie in the parish of Wroxeter and Uppington.

There is a historical octagonal tower here, built in 1607 as the summerhouse of a mansion then belonging to the Newport family of High Ercall. Edward Herbert, 1st Baron Herbert of Cherbury, whose mother was a Newport, was born there in 1583 and lived there till the age of nine. Sir Francis Newport rebuilt the mansion in a version completed by 1595, Walter Hancock being its master mason, but only the tower remains from his lifetime. The Shrewsbury architect Thomas Farnolls Pritchard lived in the tower at Eyton from 1769 until his death in 1777.

There is also a racecourse, with point-to-point races held mainly on bank holidays and other special occasions.
