= Richard Corbet (disambiguation) =

Richard Corbet (1582–1635) was an English bishop and poet.

Richard Corbet may also refer to:

- Richard Corbet (knight) (1451–1493), English knight
- Richard Corbet (MP for Lynn) (1524–1560 or later), MP for Lynn
- Richard Corbet (died 1566), MP for Shropshire
- Richard Corbet (died 1606), MP for Shropshire
- Sir Richard Corbet, 2nd Baronet (1640–1683), MP for Shrewsbury
- Sir Richard Corbet, 4th Baronet (1696–1774), of the Corbet baronets, MP for Shrewsbury

== See also ==
- Richard Corbett, former Member of the European Parliament
