= Robert Corbet (died 1583) =

English landowner, diplomat and politician

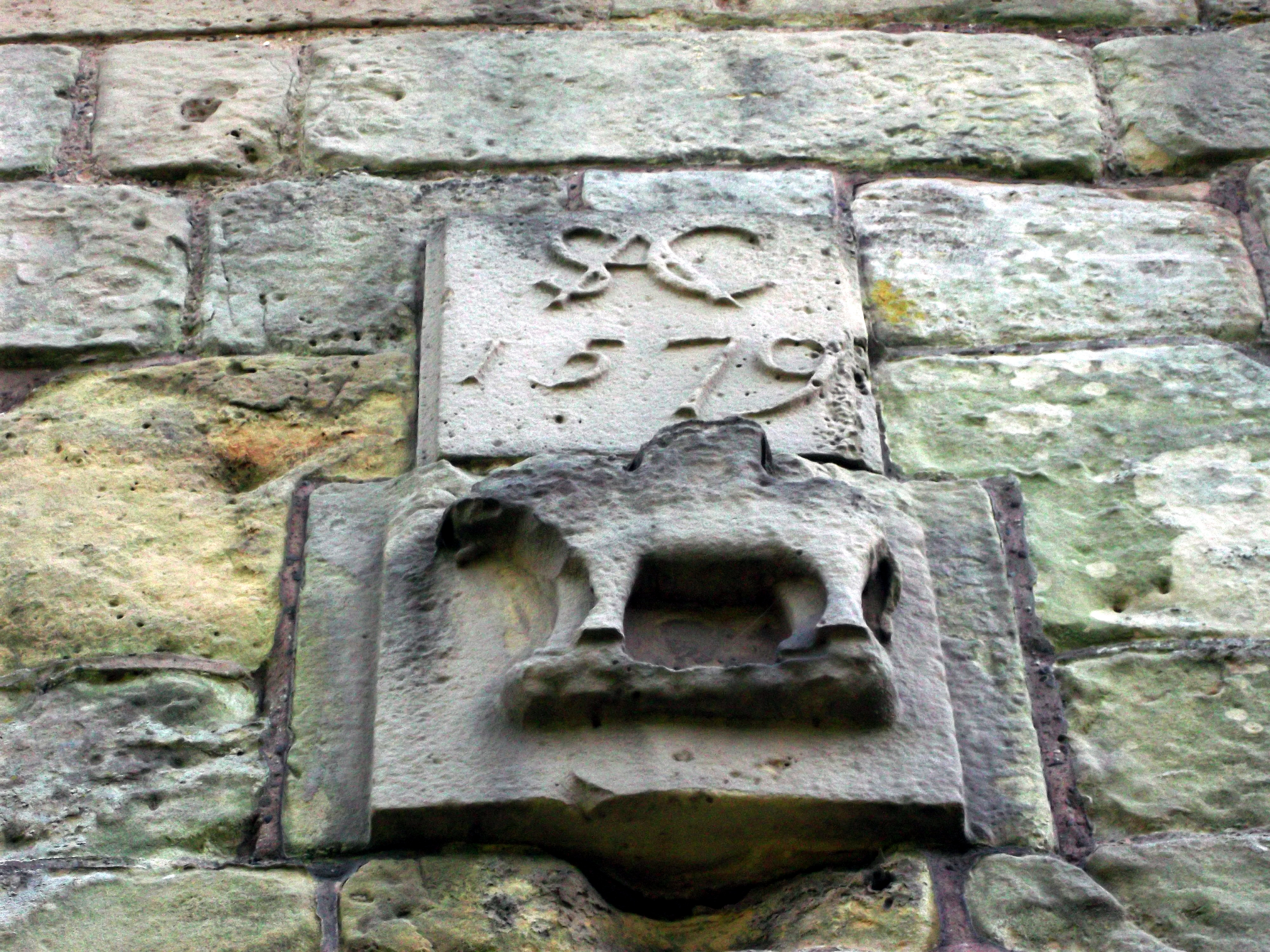
Castled elephant and monogram of Sir Andrew Corbet, Robert's father at Moreton Corbet Castle, Shropshire. Sir Andrew remodelled the medieval fortress as a comfortable manor house in Robert's youth and this stone of the gatehouse is dated the year after Sir Andrew's death, when Robert was in charge.

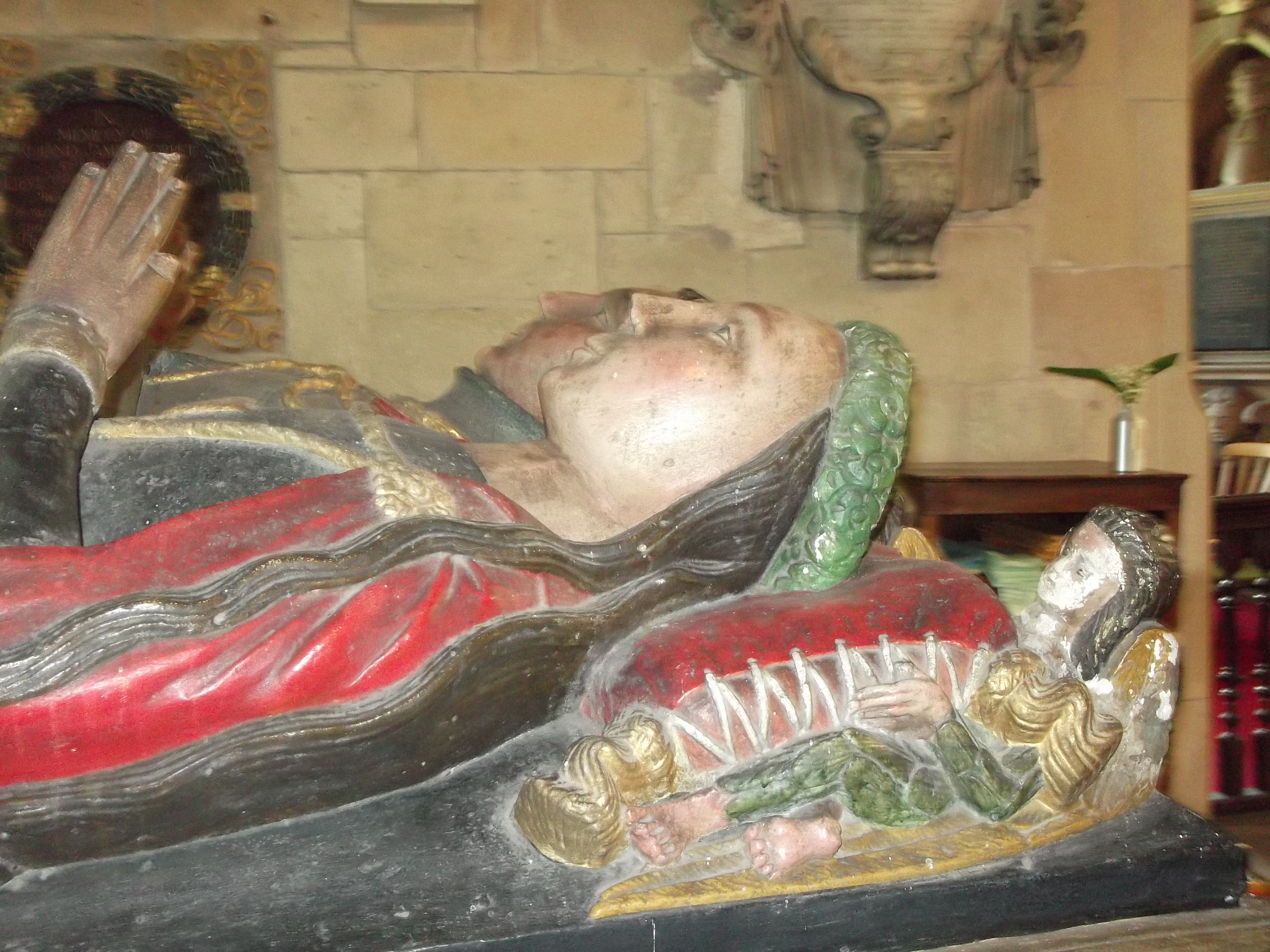
Effigy of Elizabeth Vernon, Robert Corbet's great-grandmother, in the family chapel at St Bartholomew's church, Moreton Corbet. Her husband, Sir Robert Corbet, seen behind, died in 1513, but she was still a force in family affairs.

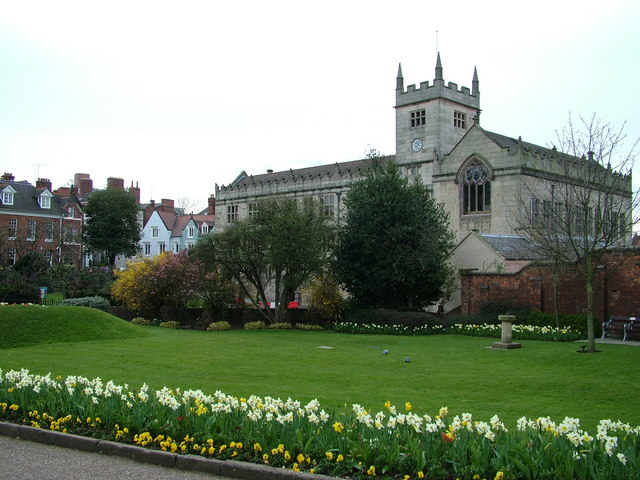
The former Shrewsbury School building, now the town's library. It is likely that Robert Corbet was educated at the school in the 1550s.

Robert Corbet (1542–1583) was an English landowner, diplomat and politician of the Elizabethan period, a Member (MP) of the Parliament of England for Shropshire, his native county.

== Background and education ==
Robert Corbet was the eldest son of

- Sir Andrew Corbet of Moreton Corbet, Shropshire.The Corbets had a history as Marcher lords in Shropshire stretching back to the Norman Conquest and were the leading landed gentry family in the county, although they were never ennobled. Their seat was at Moreton Corbet Castle, although they had very large property holdings across Shropshire and in many other parts of the country.
- Jane Needham the daughter of Sir Robert Needham of Shavington Hall, Shropshire. The Needhams were another important Shropshire gentry family and close neighbours of the Corbets.

Sir Andrew was to emerge in the 1560s as a pillar of the Elizabethan Religious Settlement. He was a member for a quarter of a century of the Council in the Marches of Wales, of which he became vice-president and effective leader in his last years. However, when Robert was born he was still a youth of about nineteen, not yet a knight. Like his father, Roger Corbet, Andrew underwent a prolonged wardship although he was fortunate that the wardship was purchased by his uncle Richard Corbet. Richard was responsible for arranging his marriage to Jane Needham and it is likely that they had been married for only a very short time before the conception of their first child. Robert was born more than a year before Andrew could take livery of his estates. He was one of at least eleven children of the marriage, including six sons. Robert had been a favourite name for Corbet heirs for centuries but had been demoted in recent generations. Elizabeth Corbet, née Vernon, Robert's great-grandmother, who survived until 1563, may have had a decisive say in the choice of name.

Augusta Corbet, the family historian, maintains that Robert Corbet was educated at Shrewsbury School and cites a known payment of 3 shillings and ninepence by Sir Andrew to the school for his three sons. While plausible, there is no other evidence. The Corbet family did have a close association with the school: Reginald Corbet, Robert's great-uncle and recorder of Shrewsbury played an important part in getting permission to establish it in 1548. However, if Robert did get his schooling at Shrewsbury, it would have been in the very early days, as the school was opened only in 1552. From the outset, it had a distinctly Calvinist ethos, and under Thomas Ashton, its head appointed in 1561, it developed a reputation as a centre for humanistic learning and drama. It is quite possibly where Corbet developed an international outlook and facility for languages that would be useful in his later career.

== Political and diplomatic career ==
=== Member of Parliament for Shropshire ===
Many Corbets had been knights of the shire for Shropshire over the centuries and it was to replace one of them that Robert Corbet became a member of parliament in 1566. The parliament had been called as long before as November 1562 and assembled in January 1563. It showed much concern with the succession question and the queen prorogued it, only recalling it in 1566 to seek a financial bail-out.

Richard Corbet, brother of Reginald and a great-uncle of Robert Corbet, had been duly elected in 1562 but died in July 1566. The young Robert was slotted into his uncle's place and held the seat until the parliament was dissolved in January 1567. He was listed as "junior" in the parliamentary record to distinguish him from his uncle Robert of Stanwardine, near Baschurch. Shropshire's second MP was Edward Leighton (died 1593), an older and more experienced man and a close colleague of Sir Andrew in the military organisation of the county and the Council in the Marches, and he was a member of the committee investigating the succession question, which continued to preoccupy parliament. However, Leighton was granted leave of absence on 16 November, leaving Robert Corbet as the county's sole representative for the closing stages of the parliament.

=== Travels ===
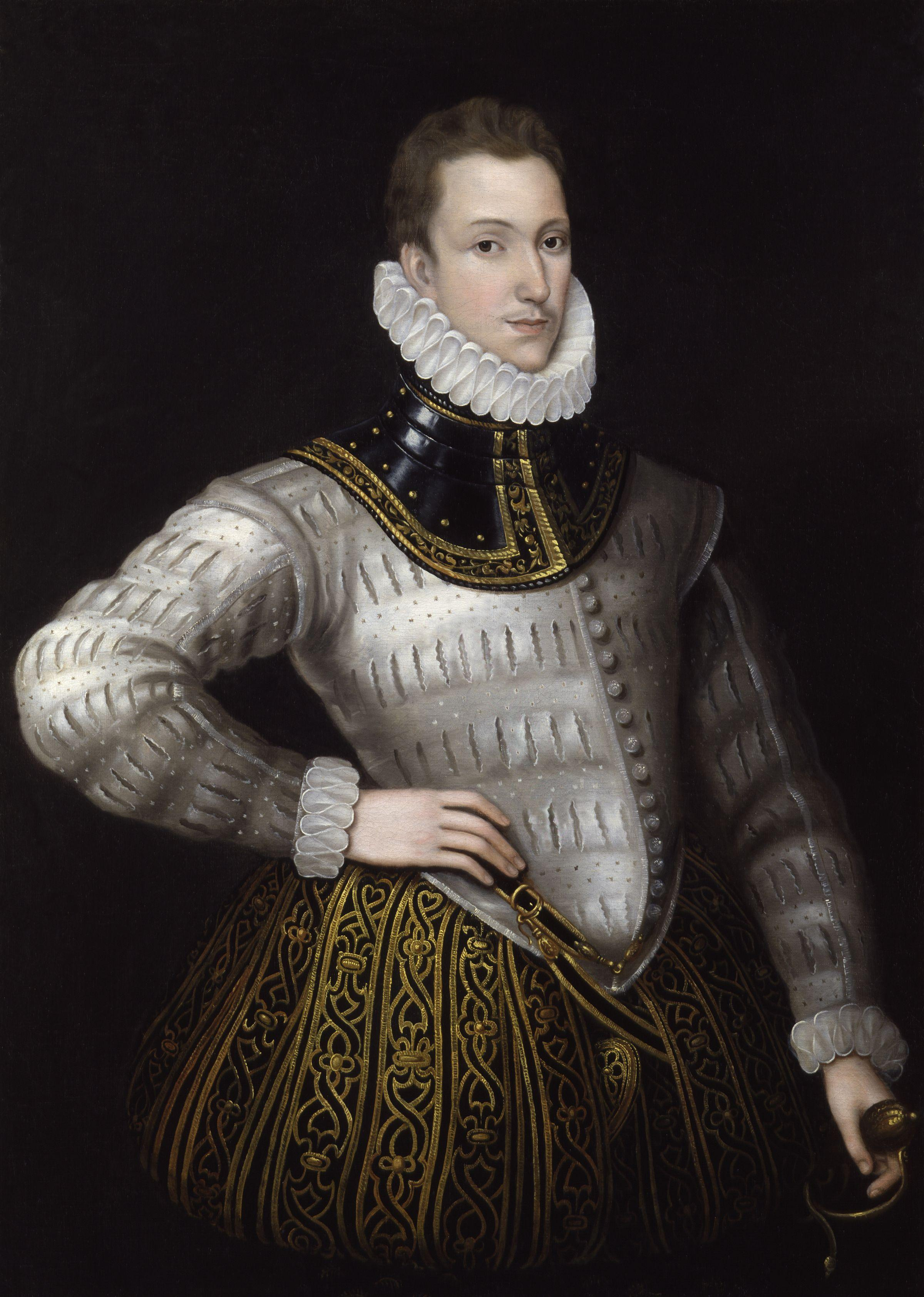
Sir Philip Sidney, a close associate of Robert Corbet on his travels in Italy.

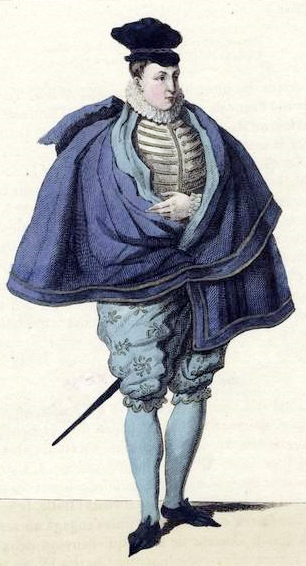
Hubert Languet, Sidney's close friend, who received Corbet in Vienna.

During the 1570s Robert Corbet travelled widely in mainland Europe, sometimes in company with Philip Sidney, an alumnus of Shrewsbury School whose father, Sir Henry Sidney, was president of the Council in the Marches and a close friend of Sir Andrew Corbet, who was formally recognised as his deputy in 1574.

On 15 April 1574 Sidney, residing in Venice, recommended Corbet in a letter to Hubert Languet, a Huguenot who acted as diplomatic representative of Augustus, Elector of Saxony and who was at that time at the court of Maximilian II, the Holy Roman Emperor in Vienna:

"In a few days you will see two noble Englishmen, to whom I shall give letters of introduction to you, and therefore it seems well to write a few words to precede their arrival, and prepare you to receive them with your wonted courtesy. The one whom I especially commend to you is Master Robert Corbet, my very greatest friend, a man of high birth, but one who, as Buchanan says, ‘in excellence of parts outdoes his birth’. He is of the right side in religion and not unpractised in the art of war; he speaks only Italian The other is Master Richard Shelley, my cousin, as also is Corbett, but nearer to me in blood as the other in friendship."

Shelley, Corbet's travelling companion on this occasion was last grand prior of the Knights of St. John in England, a Catholic notable who resided in Venice acting informally as the queen's trade representative and even less formally as a spy for the English government. Corbet set out for Vienna on 27 May, without his servant, who was too ill for the journey, but carrying a portrait of Sidney for Languet. After a brief stay in Vienna, Corbet and Shelly set out with letters of introduction from Languet to friends in Prague, Nuremberg and Augsburg. However, Corbet was soon writing back from Prague to Languet that Shelley was too ill to proceed, which Languet initially put down to Shelley's hypochondria. However, wrote Languet:

"alas he made a more just calculation of his danger than the physicians, as I learn from a second letter from our friend Corbet, who writes in despair of Richard's condition. He was at the point of death, given over by his physicians...Corbet's letter shows that he is greatly disturbed, and I do not wonder at it. He consults me about his own affairs, and asks whether he shall pursue his journey when he has lost his companion as he hears that troops are being raised in the places through which his road lies, and that all the country about the Rhine and Lorraine is in a state of great confusion. But as he intimates that he will not leave Prague until he receives my reply, I have written to him to say what I think he should do."

The regions mentioned as being in turmoil suggest that Corbet and Shelley were now making for England. Shelley survived his illness and Corbet arrived home the following year, receiving a present valued at £1 13s. 4d. from the borough of Shrewsbury on his return.

The journeys that can be reconstructed from the Sidney-Languet correspondence may be typical rather than exhaustive. A tribute in Shrewsbury's manuscript chronicle after his death says that Corbet was

"of great estimation with the Queen’s Majesty and the nobility because he could speak perfectly sundry foreign languages by reason of his long absence in his youth out of England in foreign countries and especially trained as it were in the Emperor’s court, who was like to have come to great worship had he lived."

=== Ambassador ===
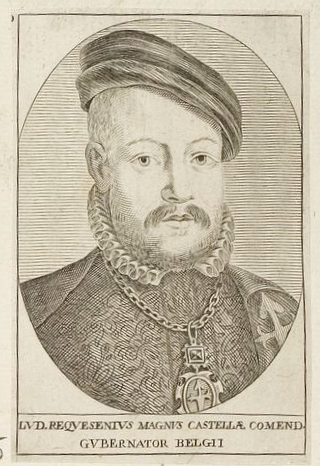
Luis de Requesens died in 1576, with his troops in an uncertain situation.

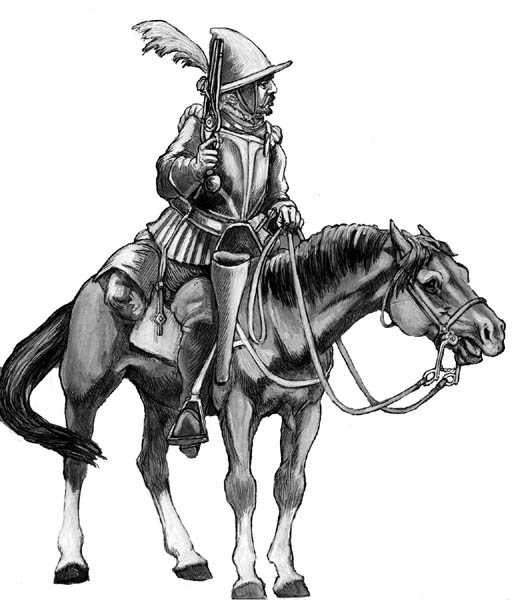
German Reiter cavalryman, circa 1577. Burghley was using an English-financed Reiter army as proxies in his subversion of France and Spain.

Corbet's earlier travels had not been officially sponsored, although he was clearly involved in promoting English and Protestant interests. However, in 1575, he received a government commission to act as an emissary to the Spanish governor of the Netherlands, Luis de Requesens y Zúñiga, known to the English as the Commendator. Requesens held the post only briefly and had shown considerably more flexibility in confronting the Dutch Revolt than the Duke of Alba, his predecessor. After significant victories, his funds had run out and he was now attempting to find common ground with the rebels under William the Silent, with the Emperor Maximilian acting as mediator: this may have been the background to Corbet and Shelley's journey to Vienna in the previous year. The English government was determined to push the negotiations towards a truce and, beyond that, to a permanent peace.

Corbet was sent as part of a three-pronged diplomatic assault, with the slightly older and considerably more experienced Henry Cobham taking responsibility for the direct approach to Spain, and John Hastings, who probably had Dutch connections, approaching the rebels. Corbet's detailed brief, dated 29 October, is preserved in the State Papers. It strongly stressed the queen's concern for England's commercial interests: "the recovering and better settling of the ancient intercourse between her subjects and those of the Low Countries." He was told to emphasise the shared interest of England and Spain in keeping the French out of the Netherlands, with their fine ports and shipping. However, there was a red line: the queen might even support Spain "if she perceived that the King would permit his subjects to enjoy their liberties and be governed peaceably." In other words, England would not abandon the Protestant cause.

At first the mission seemed to go well. By 16 November Corbet had met Requesens and reported back to Burghley on the poor morale and unpopularity of the Spanish forces. On 4 December Corbet reported that the governor was made more receptive to peace overtures by further blows to Spanish morale. They feared an intervention by forces allied to the French Huguenot champion, Henri, Prince of Condé (1552–1588), and long-expected Spanish reinforcements had amounted to a mere 700 men. There was also a rumour that the English were raising forces to aid the Dutch. Perhaps this is why Corbet found the Commendator in a much more antagonistic mood on his next encounter, a week later. Requesens openly blamed English support for sustaining the Dutch revolt and cast doubt on the good faith of the English in pressing for peace. Corbet offered to go straight to the Dutch camp and press for peace negotiations but Requesens would not hear of it, refusing to create the impression that he had made the first move. Corbet sadly requested permission to return home, concluding:

"The Commendator will condescend to any reasonable conditions of peace, the same being proffered by others first to him, and withal his Papistical religion excepted. Whether this exception be unreasonable or not he leaves to Burghley to judge."

Burghley was as much concerned by developments in the French wars of religion as in the Dutch revolt, but had no intention of committing English forces to either conflict. The very State Papers detailing Corbet's mission constantly refer to large sums expended subsidising Reiters (German mercenary cavalry) for John I, Count Palatine of Zweibrücken, called "Duke Casimir" by the English, whose forces were marching to the aid of the Prince of Condé in France's civil war. The political and social dislocation caused by this recruitment drive had destabilised the Rhineland, obstructing Corbet's travels the previous year. The rumour was deliberately put about that the reiters would also intervene in the Netherlands, thus subverting French and Spanish positions simultaneously. Requesens was agitated and may have known or suspected Burghley's role. Corbet would have known no more than Reqesens about the covert dealings of his own government.

By 26 December Corbet was on his way home, after slightly less heated concluding talks with Requesens. He had done exactly what was expected of him but was not called on to act as ambassador again. He was rewarded by being made Master of the posts and chamberlain of the Exchequer.

== Landowner ==
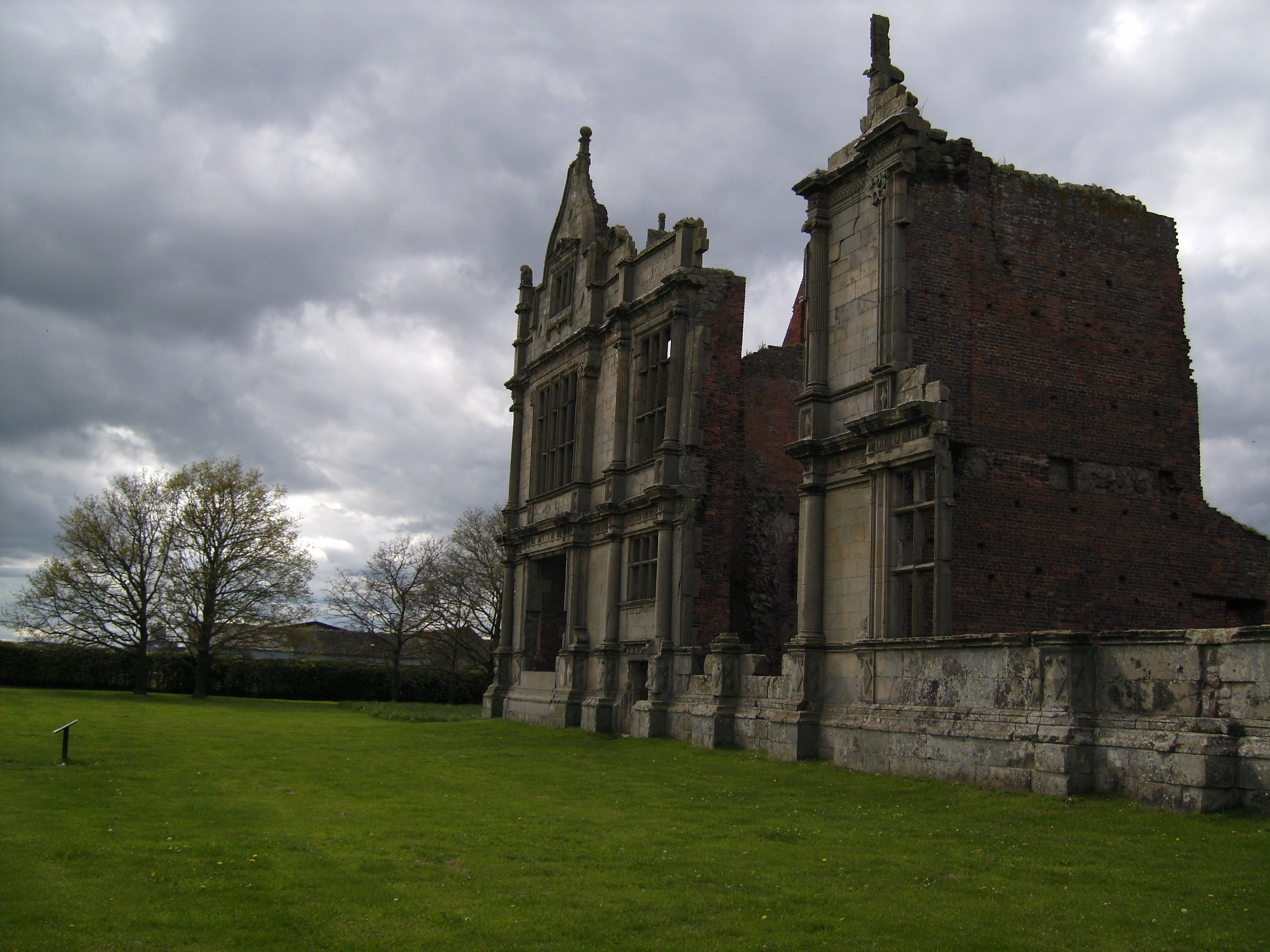
The south frontage of Robert Corbet's Elizabethan house.

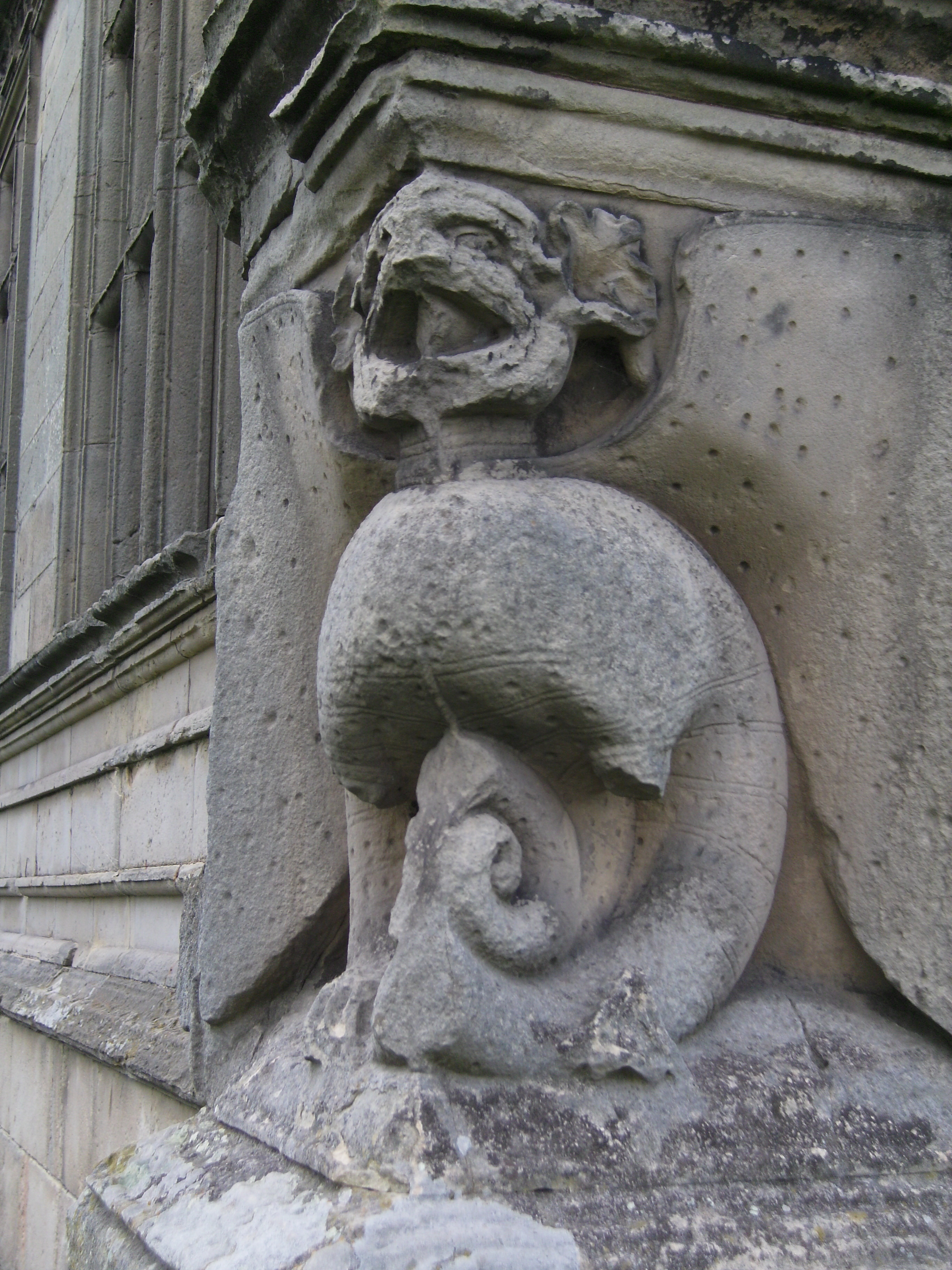
Chimera on the west corner of the frontage.

Before inheriting the Corbet estates, Robert Corbet is said to have resided in a place he called Sowbyche when signing the Shawbury parish register. Later rendered Sowbatch, this is almost certainly the modern hamlet of Sowbath, south of Stanton upon Hine Heath, in a parish neighbouring Moreton Corbet. However, it is possible that the signatory was actually Robert Corbet of Stanwardine, the uncle from whom Robert had to be distinguished in the parliamentary record. If his travels were extensive and prolonged, and he was still unmarried, it is possible he had no separate residence before he inherited the estates.

Robert Corbet's mother, Jane Needham, died in 1577 and the perpetually overworked Sir Andrew in 1578. As Sir Andrew's heir Robert Corbet became owner of very large estates. These were concentrated in Shropshire, where Sir Andrew had held land in 40 parishes, but spread over many counties: Herefordshire, Buckinghamshire, Bedfordshire, Hertfordshire, Cornwall. As befitted his new status as a major landowner, Corbet was appointed Justice of the Peace of the quorum for Shropshire from 1579 - a signal honour. The other justices were not allowed to make certain decisions without the presence of those appointed to the quorum, so this was a distinction normally reserved for experienced JPs.

On taking over the estates, his father's refurbishment of Moreton Corbet Castle was nearing completion and it is likely it became his home. However, Robert's generation had very different expectations of domestic architecture from their forebears and he very quickly set about the construction of a new home immediately south of the castle. Early in the next century, William Camden described it:

"Morton Corbet, anciently an house of the familie of Turet, afterward a Castle of the Corbets, sheweth it selfe, where within our remembrance Robert Corbet, carried away with the affectionate delight of Architecture, began to build in a barraine place a most gorgeous and stately house after the Italians modell. But death prevented him, so that hee left the new worke unfinished and the old castle defaced."

The house was wide and imposing, but shallow. Its facings were of stone but most of the internal construction was brick. Although Italian in inspiration and elaborately decorated, much of the carving was of a rustic finish. However, its large, rectangular windows and pilasters made clear it was intended for an entirely different way of living from the neighbouring castle - a significant achievement for a landed gentry family at that period. Moreton Corbet's new house was built a decade before the great examples of Elizabethan architecture, like Wollaton Hall and Hardwick Hall, began to appear. While the later halls used imported craftsmen, Corbet did his best with local masons and carvers. However, as Camden observed, he never properly finished the building and the rest was left to his brothers, who never cleared away the old castle.

== Death ==
Robert Corbet visited his uncle Walter Corbet in London in May 1583. Both uncle and nephew contracted bubonic plague. Robert survived Walter's death by a few days and himself died on 30 May. His body was returned to Moreton Corbet and buried on 24 July "next to his father and his ancientry very worshipfully." He had no surviving son, although there were two small daughters. His heir was his younger brother, Richard.

== Marriage and family ==
Corbet had married Anne, the daughter of Oliver St John, 1st Baron St John of Bletso, apparently while still young. They had two or three children:

- Roger Corbet, baptised 9 June 1561 at Shawbury, is given by Augusta Corbet as a son of Robert. However, it is likely this was a son of Robert Corbet of Stanwardine, the brother of Sir Andrew. This child survived to be an adult and died in Spain.
- Elizabeth Corbet married Henry Wallop (died 1642), a prominent parliamentarian.

- Robert Wallop, their son, was a republican politician during the English Civil War and considered a regicide. He died imprisoned in the Tower of London.

- Anne Corbet married Sir Adolphus Carey of Berkhamsted, Hertfordshire, an MP and briefly a diplomat. They were without issue.

If there was a son, there was a long gap until the births of the daughters. Both daughters seem to have been infants at the time of Corbet's death: according to the Inquisition post mortem, Elizabeth was almost 4 and Anne only 10 months. As a result of the disruption of the line of male succession, their marriages resulted in substantial losses of land to the Corbet estates. It is more likely the daughters were the only children of Robert Corbet and his wife, and that he married fairly late by the standards of the time - in his mid-30s and to a considerably younger wife. This accords better with the known facts of his wife, Anne St John's, remarriage. It also accords better with an extensive period of travel in Robert's earlier years, some of it in association with circle of Philip Sidney, generally thought to be homosexual

Corbet's widow Anne remarried after his death. Her second husband was Roland Lytton of Knebworth, Hertfordshire, a prominent politician and lawyer. They had 3 sons and 4 daughters and she died on 28 February 1602.
