= Andrew Corbet (died 1578) =

English landowner and politician

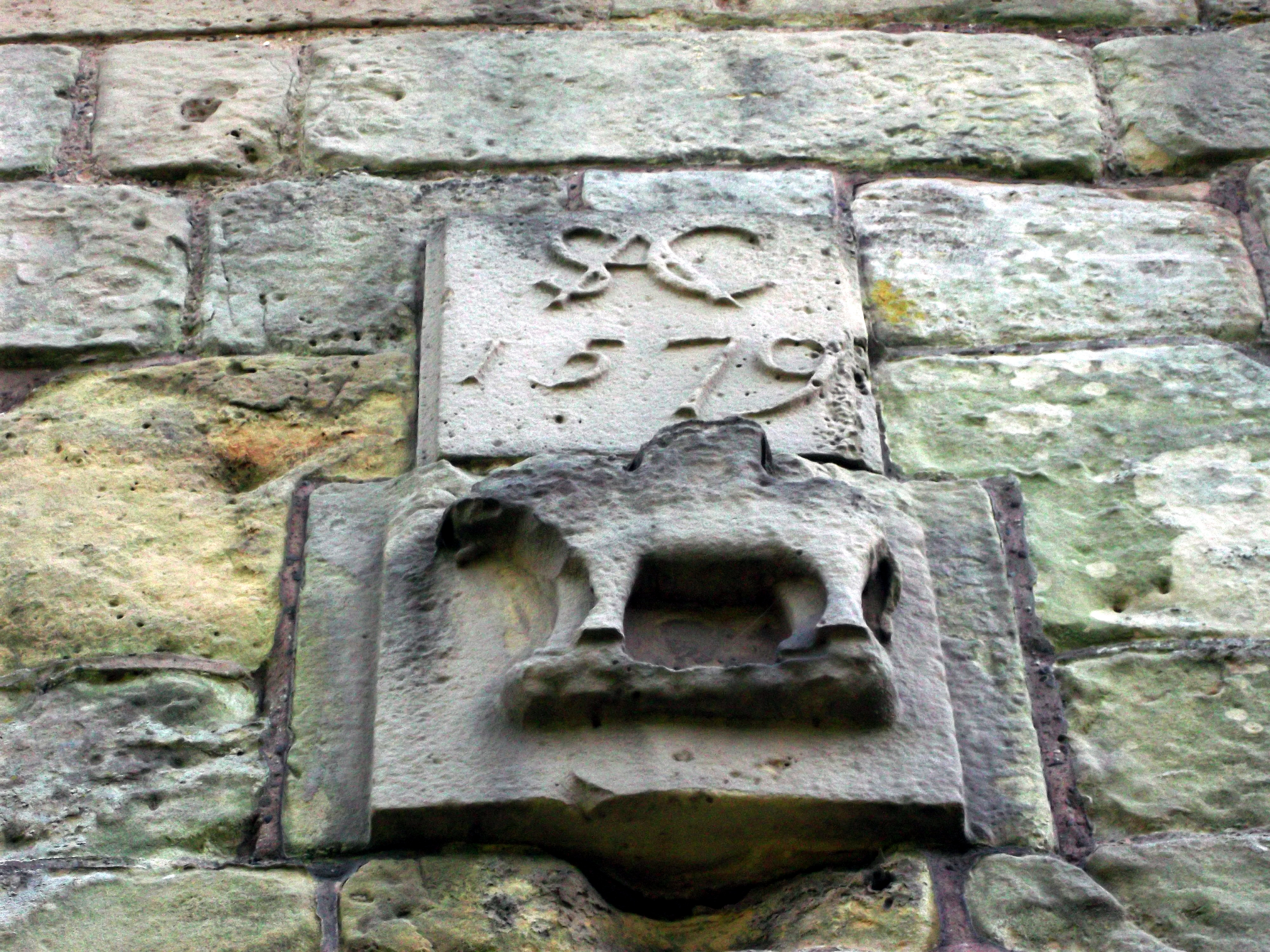
Castled elephant and monogram of Sir Andrew Corbet. Part of medieval gatehouse, modified by Sir Andrew, viewed from north. Moreton Corbet Castle, Shropshire.

Signature of Sir Andrew Corbet, 3 March 1571.

Sir Andrew Corbet (1 November 1522 – 16 August 1578) was an English Protestant politician of the mid-Tudor and early Elizabethan eras: a member of the powerful Council in the Marches of Wales for a quarter of a century. Drawn from the landed gentry of Shropshire and Buckinghamshire, he was twice a member of the Parliament of England for Shropshire.

== Background and early life ==
Andrew Corbet was the eldest son of

- Roger Corbet of Moreton Corbet, Shropshire and Linslade, Buckinghamshire.
- Anne Windsor, daughter of Andrew Windsor, 1st Baron Windsor

The Corbets had been important landholders in the Welsh Marches, particularly in Shropshire, since the Norman Conquest and many had represented their county or other constituencies in parliament. They evolved in the Tudor period into an upper gentry family, well-connected and with substantial estates, but not ennobled. Roger Corbet's father had died when he was only about twelve years of age and his wardship was purchased by Sir Andrew Windsor, who married him to his daughter. Their sons included Andrew and Jerome Corbet, both to be MPs.

Andrew was not a common given name in Tudor England. Andrew Corbet was named after Sir Andrew Windsor, his maternal grandfather, whose given name was derived from the surname of his mother, Elizabeth Andrews. The Windsors remained important and useful contacts for the Corbets. Andrew Windsor had made a vast fortune from his royal court contacts and posts. As Keeper of the Great Wardrobe to Henry VII of England, he had responsibility for an annual budget running into thousands of pounds and was an important part of the network of his cousin, the notorious Edmund Dudley. Surviving Dudley's fall, he continued in high office under Henry VIII.

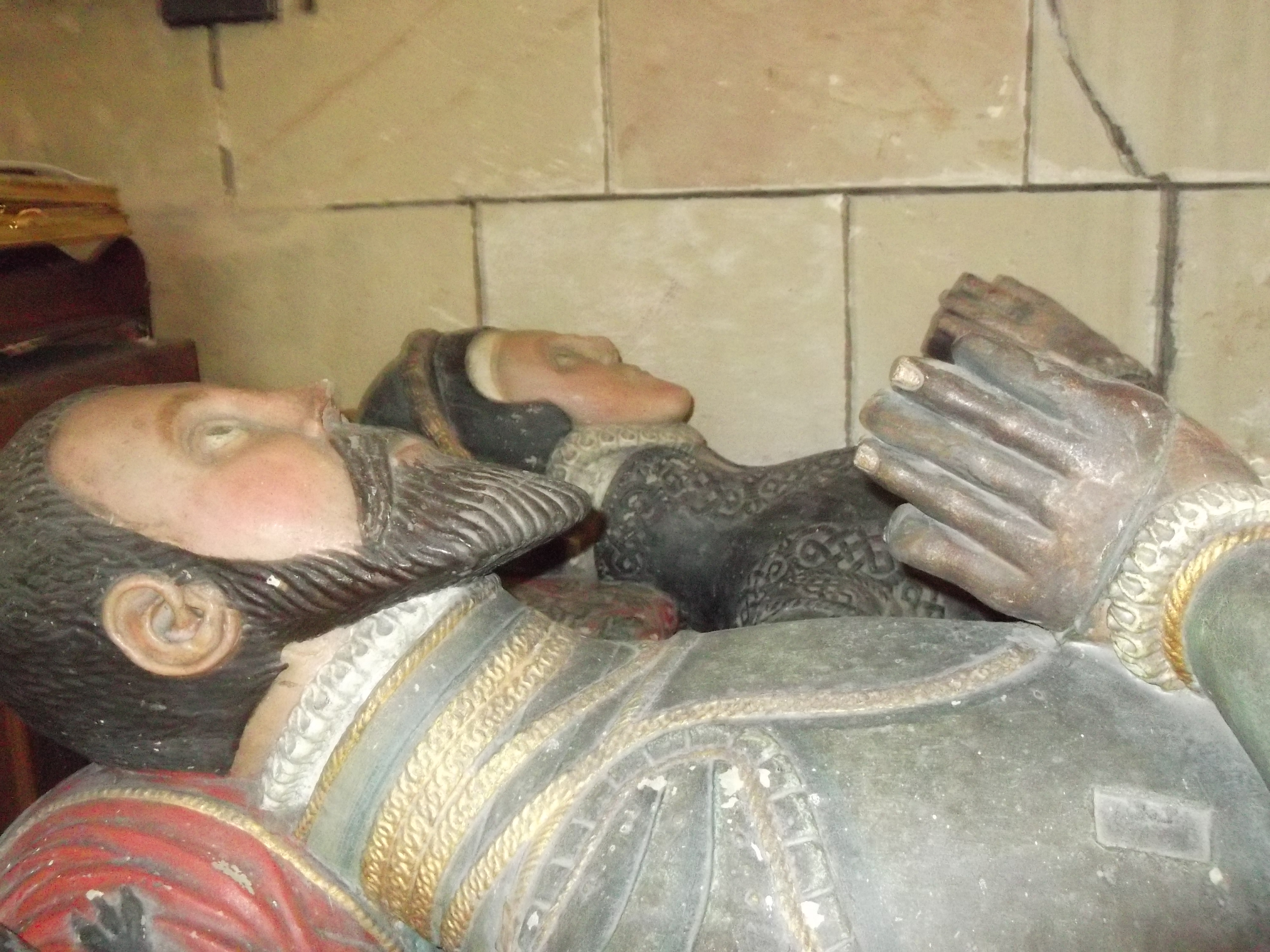
Effigies of Richard Corbet and Margaret Wortley, née Savile, his wife, in St Bartholomew's church, Moreton Corbet. Richard held Andrew's wardship for about four years.

Roger Corbet died on 20 December 1538. He had made his will on 27 November 1538, having already fallen sick. Andrew was still only 16, and Roger, considering his own long wardship, wrote:

"I require and humbly beseech my supervisors and my executrix, tenderly lamenting the captive bondage of wardship, to consult together, pondering the readiest ways how to redeem my heir out of the thraldom and bondage of wardship, for whose marriage I was offered one thousand marks"

Despite Roger's hopes, Andrew too was forced into wardship, as his mother's will attests. However, his uncle Richard Corbet, Roger's younger brother, had been making some headway as a courtier and was able to use his contacts to obtain the wardship. The grant was confirmed in July 1539. and allowed Richard an annuity of £40 from Andrew's Shropshire estates, a relatively light imposition. It was presumably Richard who arranged his nephew's marriage to Jane Needham, daughter of Sir Robert Needham of Shavington Hall, Shropshire, which had taken place by 1542. The process seems to have passed amicably and Andrew was often to work alongside his uncle, finally inheriting most of his property when Richard died sine prole in 1566.

In 1543 Andrew Corbet obtained livery, i.e. took full possession, of his inheritance. The paperwork was signed as part of a batch at St Albans on 26 November by William, Lord St. John, the Lord Chamberlain, John Hynde, the surveyor of wardships and liveries, and John Sewster.

== Landowner ==
By the end of his life, in 1578, Andrew Corbet owned property in 40 parishes of Shropshire, making him one of the most important landowners in the county. He also held manors and various lands in many other counties – principally Buckinghamshire, Bedfordshire, Cornwall, Herefordshire, Essex, and Hertfordshire.

The Corbets were strong in Buckinghamshire partly because of the dominant position in the county of their allies, the Windsors. However, their holdings went back several generations to land acquired through Andrew's great-grandmother, Elizabeth Lucy. These included the manors of Cublington and Linslade, (now in Bedfordshire). The Lucy inheritance extended to Wigginton, Hertfordshire. The Cornish lands were inherited from the now extinct Arcedekne family and included an estate near Truro. In Warwickshire there was the manor of Harborough Magna, which had already been held by four generations of Corbets.

In 1546, Andrew Corbet paid over £550 to acquire from the Crown the manor of Redcastle, in north Shropshire, together with other lands in the county. He extended his Shropshire holdings under Mary I by leasing estates and also acquired houses in Shrewsbury. However, in 1561 he disposed of much of his property in Essex, including the manor of Woodham Mortimer.

Corbet lived mainly at Moreton Corbet Castle, which he modified considerably, changing it from an uncomfortable medieval fortress into a manor house suited to a more stable age, and one in which small fortifications could play only a limited part.

Corbet occupied all the posts generally reserved for important landowners in his own, and some other, counties. He was appointed Justice of the Peace (JP) for Shropshire in 1547 and remained so for the remainder of his life. He was also appointed JP in Gloucestershire, Herefordshire and Worcestershire in 1554. He was pricked to be High Sheriff of Shropshire in the reigns of three monarchs: under Edward VI in 1550, under Mary I in 1555, and under Elizabeth I in 1561.

== Political and military career ==
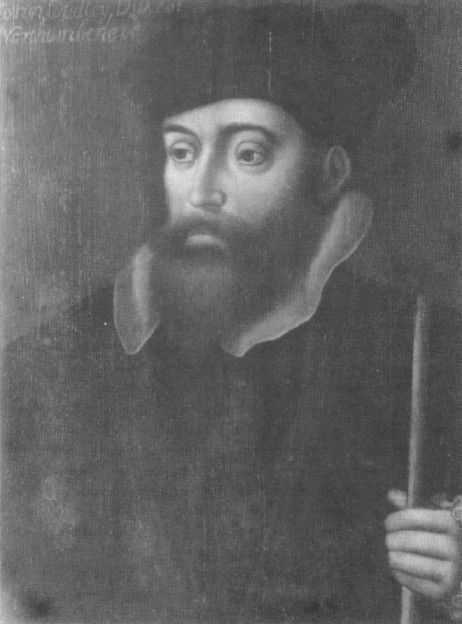
John Dudley, from a painted panel at Penshurst Place. Dudley was an early ally and patron of Corbet.

=== Protégé of Dudley ===
Corbet served with distinction in the Scottish campaigns of Edward VI, the latter part of the war known as the Rough Wooing. He was knighted for his military services in 1547 by John Dudley, Earl of Warwick. Dudley seems to have spotted his potential and took him into his circle of regional allies. When he became president of the Council in the Marches of Wales, Dudley asked Francis Talbot, 5th Earl of Shrewsbury to excuse Corbet further service in the Scottish wars to help him in the Welsh Marches. Corbet was made a member of the council in 1553 and remained so, surviving the fall of his patron Dudley after the abortive attempt to install Lady Jane Grey as queen. Corbet continued to progress and to prosper throughout Mary's reign, although his Protestant sympathies must have been apparent from the outset.

=== MP for Shropshire, 1555 ===
Corbet was elected Member (MP) for Shropshire in the Parliament of England summoned on 3 September 1555 – the fourth and penultimate of Mary's reign. He was returned, first in order of precedence, with Sir Henry Stafford, a nonentity who had failed twice to secure election in Staffordshire, where his family had great influence. While Stafford's incumbency passed without notice in the parliamentary record, Corbet was noted as one who voted against an important government bill, alongside his uncle Reginald Corbet. This was particularly notable as Sir Andrew had just been chosen as Sheriff, a politically sensitive post, in his native county. In fact he was also Shropshire's commissioner for the loan of 1558, levied to pay for England's disastrous participation in the Italian War of 1551–59, which led to the loss of the Pale of Calais.

=== MP for Shropshire, 1559 ===
Sir Andrew did not serve in the parliament of 1558, the last of Mary's reign, although his uncle Richard represented the county. He was, however, elected again to the first parliament of Elizabeth I, which was summoned on 5 December 1558 and sat for just over three months, from 28 January to 8 May 1559, vindicating the moves the queen and her advisers had already made towards the Elizabethan Religious Settlement. The election was uncontested, like all elections for the Shropshire county seats in Elizabeth's reign. His colleague on this occasion was Sir Arthur Mainwaring of Ightfield, another active local official whose family was to become almost as experienced in parliamentary representation as the Corbets, and a first cousin of Sir Andrew through his mother, Dorothy Corbet.

=== "The fittest man for a charge" ===
Corbet was extremely active regionally in Elizabeth's reign. An important area of work was the Council in the Marches, from 1560 under the presidency of Sir Henry Sidney, the son-in-law of John Dudley, who was frequently involved in Irish affairs. Sir Andrew was accompanied on the council from 1560 by both his uncles, Richard and Reginald and took increasing responsibility, signing orders for the council from 1574. He also took on numerous military and civil responsibilities in Shropshire and elsewhere.

In 1560 Corbet was sent to Berwick-upon-Tweed with a force of 200 men as part of Elizabeth's support for the Scottish Reformation against French intervention. The English army besieged the French in Leith. After the death of Mary of Guise, on 11 June, negotiations began and the troops on both sides were able to relax a little. Corbet was among those English soldiers who banqueted with the French at the truce. A letter from Elizabeth's ambassador Sir Thomas Randolph to Sir Henry Killigrew described how

"The English brought beef, bacon, capon, chickens, wine, beer, and such stuff as they had. The French (to signify what difference there was between assiegers and assiegees,) brought with them a cold capon roast, a pasty of a baken horse, and six rats well roasted, giving them to understand that that was the best fresh vivers they had, and of such as those they lacked no store. Should himself have been at the banquet; there was at it Vaughan, General of Mount Pelham, Sir Andrew Corbet, and Sir Edward Felton. They departed kindly, whatsoever their meeting shall be."

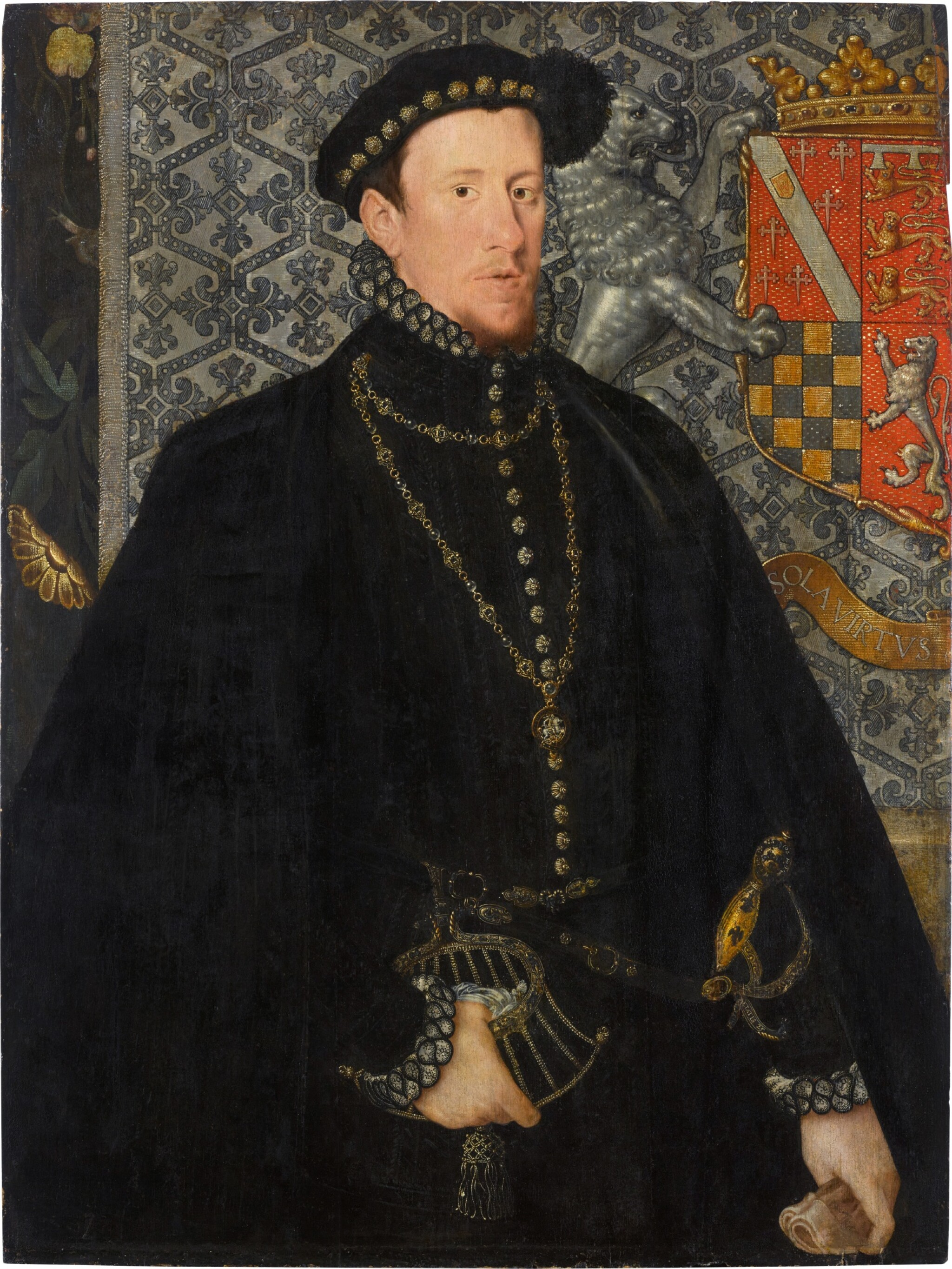
Thomas Howard, 4th Duke of Norfolk. Corbet was the government's most trusted agent in Shropshire during the crisis centred on Norfolk's alleged plots.

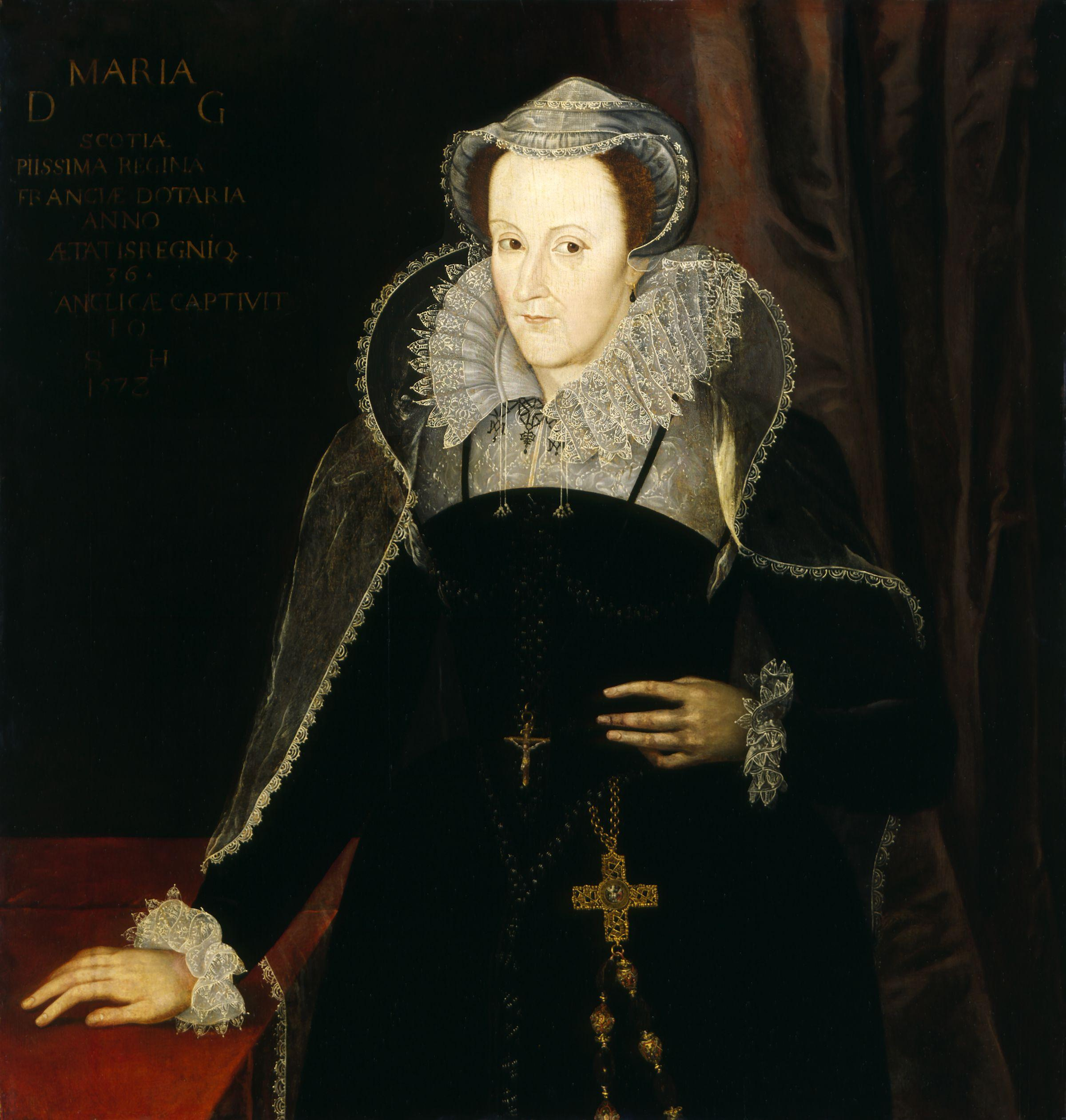
Mary, Queen of Scots after Nicholas Hilliard. The crisis of 1569–71 centred on schemes to marry Mary to Norfolk and to place her on the English throne.

By the Treaty of Edinburgh both England and France agreed to withdraw their forces. Despite the apparent levity of the scene before Leith, the Shropshire contingent seems to have suffered heavy losses: the State Papers for 29 November, when local levies were being reimbursed, contain the entry:

"The Queen to the Lord Treasurer. Warrant to pay Sir Andrew Corbet coat and conduct money for 200 men, (less thirty-seven who are dead,) to Berwick."

However, the experience seems to have rekindled Corbet's interest in military matters. Appointed commissioner for musters in Shropshire in 1562, he did not treat the post as ceremonial but made a detailed investigation of the county's war-readiness and submitted a report on the state of armour in the county. Shrewsbury's town records refer to numerous visits and gifts in connection with his work on the musters. His report of 1569 proposing a small standing force was duly noted in the State Papers.

Corbet's commitment to the Protestant cause was by now well-known: in 1564 the bishops letter to the Privy Council of England described him as sound in religion and mentioned that his advice had been sought in clarifying the religious position of JPs. During the alleged plot of 1569 by Thomas Howard, 4th Duke of Norfolk, Thomas Ashton, the head of Shrewsbury School and a government informer, described Corbet for William Cecil, 1st Baron Burghley. Acknowledging that he was essentially a modest man who preferred quietness, Ashton called him:

"the only staid man, most secret, true and faithfullest to his prince ... in all these parts of the realm ... the fittest man for a charge wherein consisteth the stay of the country."

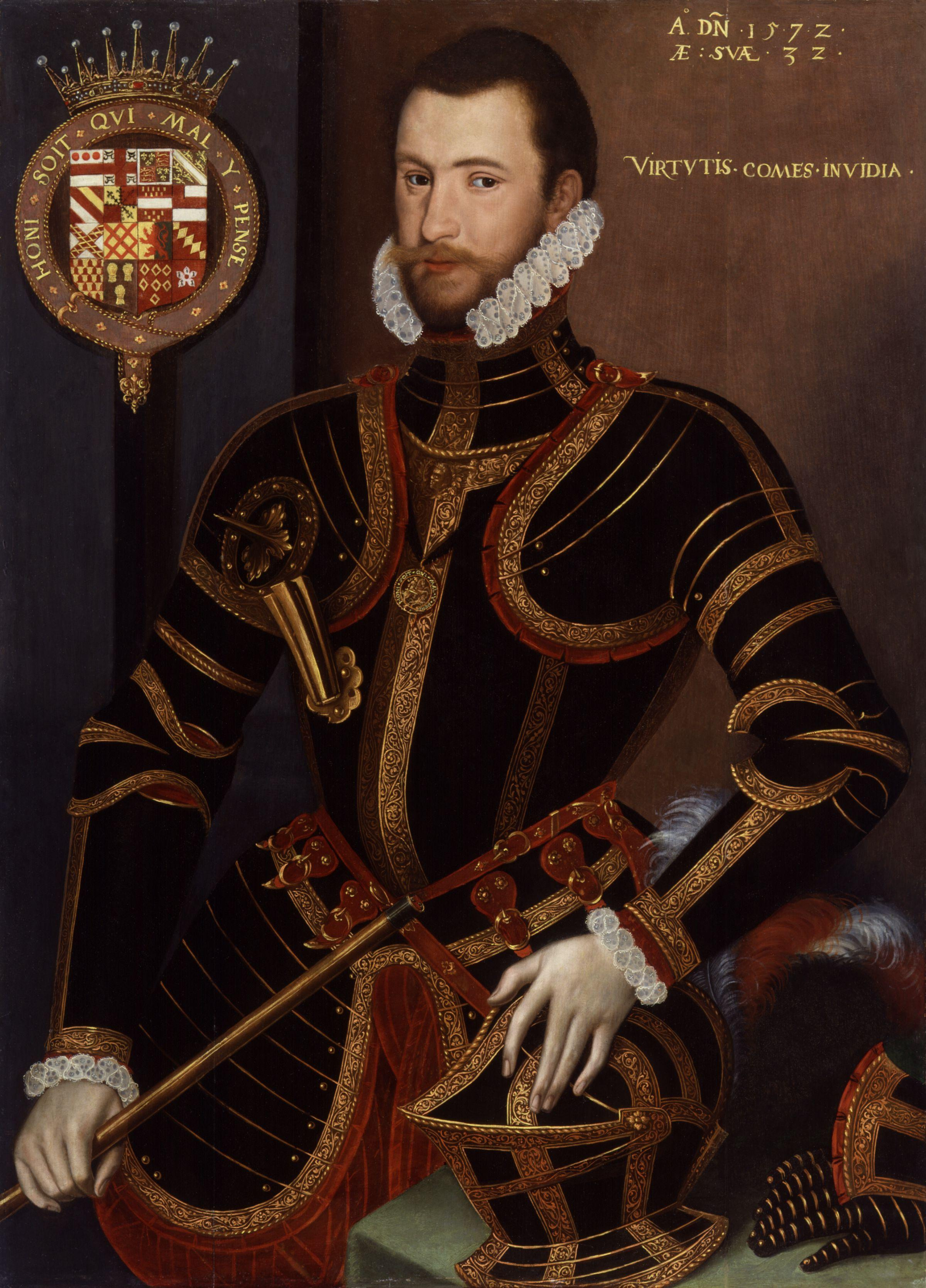
Walter Devereux, 1st Earl of Essex. Corbet was a feoffee of his estate.

In 1571, with plots still in the air, the Privy Council wrote to reliable county officials to secure their help in ensuring a "good choice to be made of knights, citizens and burgesses" to the short-lived parliament of that year. Corbet was the sole Shropshire recipient of the letter and his letter to the bailiffs of Shrewsbury, arranging a March election "to the accomplishment of Her Highnesses pleasure", survives.

Later in the year Corbet was forced to write again, excusing himself from helping the authorities collect the subsidy because he was involved in the arrest of Lawrence Banester, a recusant and the Duke of Norfolk's northern agent, as well as a trustee of the Dacre family estates, who lived at Wem in Shropshire. Norfolk had been the focus of a swirl of accusations and counter-accusations from the Rising of the North in 1569 to the Ridolfi plot in 1571. It seems that Banester was the source of most of the rumours, as he had several times written, perhaps on his own authority, to the Dacres and other Catholic nobles, inciting rebellion in favour of Mary, Queen of Scots. After he tried to ride to Scotland with a bag of gold to solicit support for Mary, Corbet and others were sent to arrest him, search his home and impound his papers. On 6 September Burghley and Robert Dudley, 1st Earl of Leicester received Corbet's report of the discovery of incriminating letters, which he enclosed. The next day, Norfolk himself was arrested and conveyed to the Tower of London. Corbet continued interviewing witnesses, uncovering a long propaganda campaign by Banester against Elizabeth's succession to the throne. Under threat of torture, Banester talked and was ultimately spared, although Norfolk himself was executed.

Corbet's involvement in regional and local affairs only increased with time. From 1573 to 1578 he was Shropshire's commissioner in matters as diverse as oyer and terminer, a key function in managing the judicial system, for sewers, and for the survey of tanneries. When Walter Devereux, 1st Earl of Essex, a key territorial magnate in the region, died in 1576, his will appointed Corbet one of a group of officials to act as feoffees of his estates.

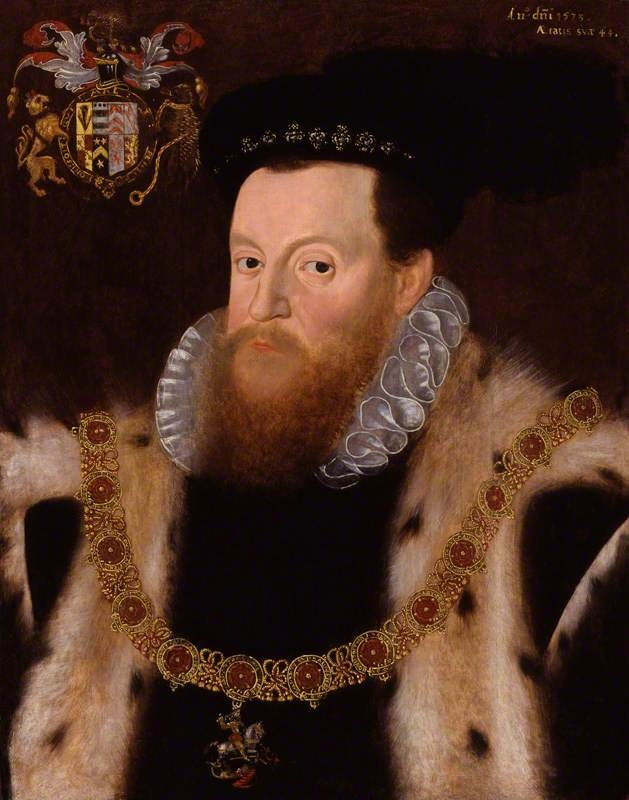
Sir Henry Sidney, attributed to Arnold Bronckorst or his school. Sidney's dual responsibility for Wales and Ireland placed an increasing onus on Corbet, formalised by his appointment as vice-president of the Council in the Marches.

In 1575, when Sidney departed for the second time to take up the position of Lord Deputy of Ireland, he invested Corbet formally as vice-president of the Council in the Marches. The appointment was denounced by William Gerard, a conscientious justice in Wales and a former vice-president himself, on the grounds that "a very sickly man, not able to take the toil of that service." Clearly Corbet was already ill but he proved competent and energetic, making a determined effort to stamp out corruption. When famine followed plague in Shrewsbury, he took steps to increase food supplies. He wrote to the town bailiffs in August 1576, offering to buy food from other markets in the marches for the beleaguered town "daily as you shall warn or send me word.". Jane, his wife, died around 7 January 1577. His own illness was progressing and he was compelled to offer his resignation from the vice-presidency later in 1577. In response to his letter, the queen commented "we could be well content to have used you longer in our service" and asked him to report to her soon on the state of the marches.

== Death ==
Corbet died on 16 August 1578. Shrewsbury's chronicle described him as "such a jewel to all Shropshire that the like was not for many years before." He was buried in St. Bartholomew's Church in Moreton Corbet, immediately to the north of his home at the castle. Thomas Bentham, the Bishop of Coventry and Lichfield gave the funeral sermon in church and a further oration was delivered to a crowd outside by the curate of St Chad's Church, Shrewsbury.

As Sir Andrew had failed to make a will, his eldest son Robert was granted administration of the estate on 22 August. Robert completed his refurbishment of the castle, with Sir Andrew's monogram, SAC, being carved above the gatehouse in 1579. However, the castle was not to the tastes of the cosmopolitan Robert and he immediately began the construction of a grand new house on the Italian model immediately to the south.

== Marriage and family ==
Corbet married Jane, the daughter of Sir Robert Needham of Shavington Hall, Shropshire, with whom he had six sons and five daughters. They included

- Robert Corbet, Sir Andrew's heir and successor, who had already represented Shropshire in the parliament of 1563, and who died of plague while visiting his uncle Walter Corbet in London.
- Richard Corbet, a future MP for Shropshire, who succeeded to Sir Andrew's estates on the death of his elder brother.
- Sir Vincent Corbet, Sir Andrew's youngest son, inherited the family estates on the death of his brother Richard.

- Sir Andrew Corbet, Sir Vincent's son, was a prominent Shropshire MP.

- Sir Vincent Corbet, 1st Baronet, the second Sir Andrew's son, was a Royalist soldier of the English Civil War
- Richard Corbet, another of the second Sir Andrew's sons, was also a prominent Royalist soldier.

- Anne Corbet, who was the first wife of Sir Walter Leveson, a wealthy Shropshire and Staffordshire landowner and MP who engaged in piracy and later became mentally incapacitated.

- Richard Leveson, their son and Sir Andrew's grandson, was a distinguished Elizabethan seaman who rose to the rank of Vice-Admiral.
