= Jerome Corbet =

Member of the Parliament of England

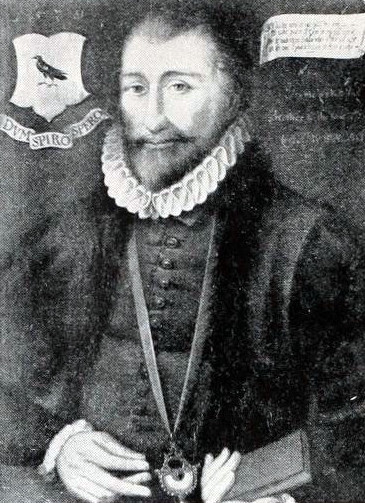
Jerome Corbet (died 1598) of the Middle Temple and Beslow, Shropshire.

Jerome Corbet (born in the 1530s; died 1598) was an Elizabethan politician and lawyer of Shropshire landed gentry background. A brother of Sir Andrew Corbet and, like him, a supporter of the Elizabethan Religious Settlement, he became an MP for Bridgnorth and a member of the Council in the Marches of Wales.

== Background and education ==
Jerome Corbet was the youngest son of

- Roger Corbet (died 1538) of Moreton Corbet, Shropshire, and Linslade, Buckinghamshire, son of Sir Robert Corbet (died 1513) and Elizabeth Vernon (died 1563). The Corbets were a wealthy and powerful gentry who could trace their link with Shropshire and the Welsh Marches back to the Norman Conquest.
- Anne Windsor (died 1550–51), daughter of Andrew Windsor, 1st Baron Windsor. The Windsors could also trace their ancestry back to the Norman Conquest and were hereditary wardens of Windsor Castle, from which they derived their name. Sir Andrew, a cousin of the notorious Edmund Dudley, had acquired immense wealth and powers of patronage as Keeper of the Great Wardrobe under both Henry VII and Henry VIII, a post in the kings' secret financial system which gave him control of a vast budget.

Jerome Corbet's parents married because Roger Corbet's father died when he was about 12 years old and his marriage and wardship fell into the hands of Windsor, who arranged Roger's marriage to his own daughter, Anne. Both Corbet and Windsor family connections were to prove useful to Jerome, who was faced by the prospect of earning his own living, as he was not destined to succeed to the Corbet estates.

Roger Corbet died in 1538. His will mentions that he has three sons beside Andrew, his heir, but the scribe failed to include Jerome's name alongside his brothers, Walter and Robert, referring instead vaguely to "brethren". This part of the will was probably transcribed from an earlier version made before Jerome was born and inadequately amended, so Jerome was still an infant at the time of his father's death. Jerome and his brothers were each left an allowance of £6 13s. 4d. per year from age 21 until they could earn their own living of at least £20 a year.

When Anne, his mother, died, probably in 1551, she was still trying to secure the future of her younger children. Her first priority was her unmarried daughter, Elizabeth, for whose marriage she left 300 marks, equal to £200 – a sum which was to be divided between Walter, Robert and Jerome if Elizabeth died unwed. However, Anne's next priority was to leave an allowance of £9 per annum for Jerome's education.

Following in the footsteps of his uncle Reginald Corbet, who had faced a similar situation, Jerome entered the Middle Temple in 1555. Apparently, his brother Walter was also at that time studying for the bar as the Middle Temple Parliament noted:

"Admissions. 22 June. Jerome Corbett as expectant to a chamber with Walter Corbett his brother, and he will give place to ancients."

The admission date suggests, but cannot prove, a birth date around 1537, as 18 was commonly the age of admission to legal training.

== Legal and political career ==
=== Lawyer ===
Corbet was called to the bar by 1569 – probably much earlier, although his slowness was apparently notable – since he was recorded as an utter barrister in that year.

"Admissions: 27 June. Jerome Corbet, gent., fellow of the Utter Bar, to Edmund Wyndsore's chamber, called "le Parliament Howse"; fine. 40s."

Edmund Windsor, the owner of the chambers, was his uncle, a brother of Anne Windsor. Two years later, it was recorded that he was sharing the chamber with his cousin, Edward Windsor, 3rd Baron Windsor.

"Ordered, that Edward lord Windsor shall have, at his pleasure, his chamber called "the Parliament Chamber," notwithstanding the admission of Mr. Jerome Corbet, who will move therefrom whenever the said lord or Frederick, his eldest son, shall wish to reside there; but they must pay Corbet for his expenses in the said chamber."

=== The Council in the Marches ===
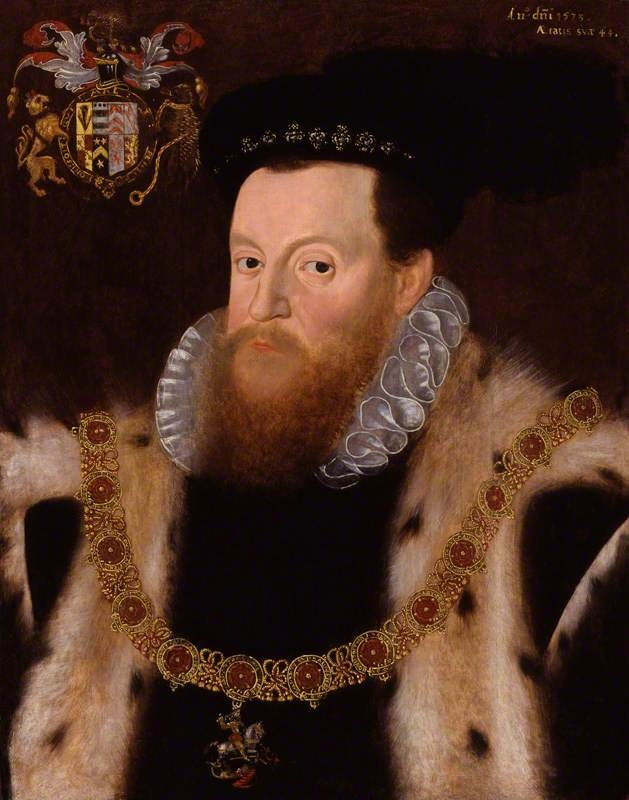
Sir Henry Sidney, President of the Council in the Marches of Wales, 1559–1586.

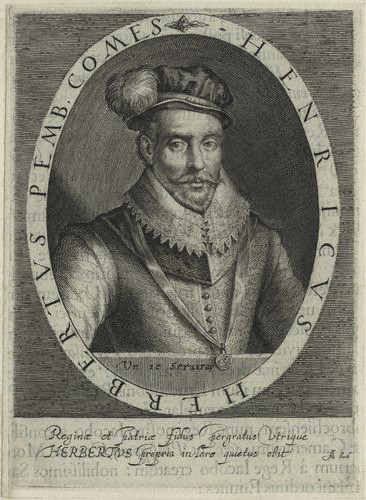
Henry Herbert, 2nd Earl of Pembroke, President of the Council in the Marches of Wales, 1586–1601.

In 1575 Corbet was appointed to the Council in the Marches of Wales, which oversaw the government of much of Wales as well as the border counties of England, including his native Shropshire. A letter of that year to Francis Walsingham, the Principal Secretary said he was "so slow of despatch as not meet for" the position. At this time the Council was under the leadership of its vice-president, his brother Sir Andrew Corbet, in the absence of the president, Sir Henry Sidney, who had similar responsibilities in Ireland. Despite the criticism, Jerome attended regularly and was used to arbitrate issues concerning the court.

By this time Corbet had married Dorothy Poyner, a twice widowed heiress who brought him a home and landed estate at Beslow, near Wroxeter, when her father died in 1578. He was now clearly committed too and actively involved in the administration of his own and neighbouring counties, and it is likely that Corbet gave up his London base, moving from private practice to work mainly or entirely as a government lawyer. He was appointed a Justice of the Peace in Shropshire in 1575 and from 1580 was J.P. of the quorum not only in Shropshire but also in Gloucestershire, Herefordshire, and counties in Wales. As this gave him a key position in decisions by the benches of those counties, it seems he had proved his worth. When Sir Andrew died in 1578 he continued in office on the Council in the Marches, and he was not removed in 1586, when Sidney himself died. Henry Herbert, 2nd Earl of Pembroke, who was appointed in Sidney's place, was a partisan of the moderate puritan and royal favourite Robert Dudley, 1st Earl of Leicester, Sidney's brother-in-law, and he brought essentially similar attitudes and energy to the post.

=== MP for Bridgnorth ===
Jerome Corbet was elected MP for the Borough of Bridgnorth in Shropshire in 1584. Bridgnorth's representatives were elected by the town's two bailiffs and 24 aldermen, supposedly with the consent of the commonalty. In fact, the Council in Marches had considerable influence on outcomes. The Privy Council had ordered Sir Andrew Corbet to supervise elections in 1571 and Sir Henry Sidney had placed his own servants in seats at least twice. As a member of the council, Jerome was in a good position to secure his own election, although the task may have been allocated to him. His family were also the richest gentry family in the county, although under the headship of the still inexperienced Richard Corbet, which was never an obstacle to political advancement. The Corbets were more often numbered among the knights of the shire for Shropshire, their natural home as landed gentry. However, boroughs, dependent for their liberty and prosperity on their legal status, frequently sought out lawyers to represent them, assuming that they would be in a good position to understand, influence and redraft legislation. For this reason, Shrewsbury had been persuaded during the incumbency of Reginald Corbet to make its recorder an MP ex officio. On all these counts, Jerome, a wealthy, political and well-connected lawyer was an obvious choice.

The parliament itself was short-lived, elected during October and November 1584 and dissolved in September 1585. Corbet never sat in parliament subsequently.

== Death ==
Jerome Corbet died in 1598 and was buried in the family chapel at Moreton Corbet parish church on 30 July. There is no memorial but an apparently contemporary portrait survives. He is shown dressed in contemporary fashion, with a Latin motto in the top left corner of the painting: Dum spiro spero – While I still breathe, I hope.

== Marriage and Family ==
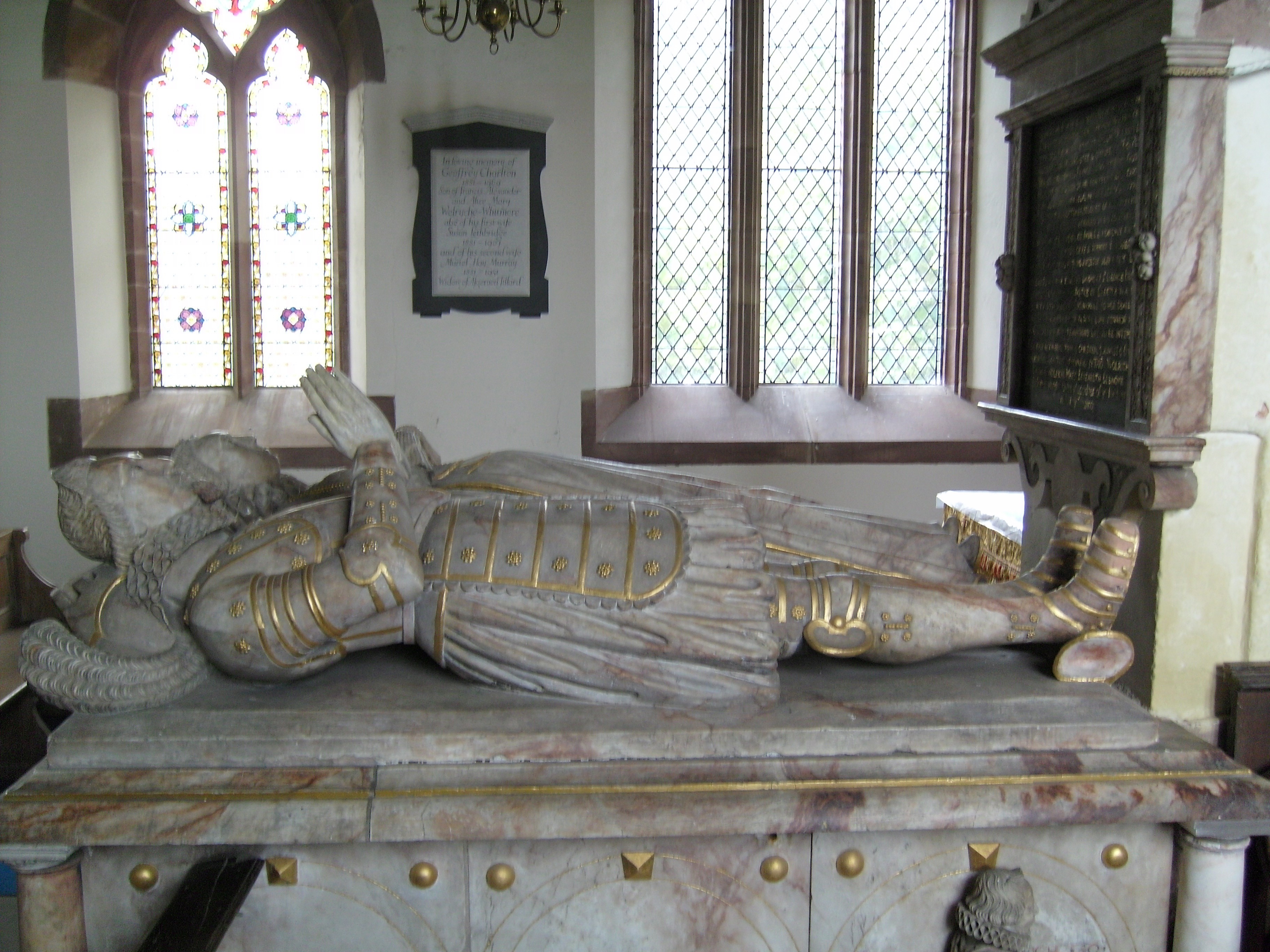
Effigies of Francis Wolryche and his wife Margaret Bromley, St Andrew's church, Quatt. Francis was the son of Dorothy Poyner and inherited the property of his half-brother Robert Corbet.

Jerome Corbet's wife was Dorothy Poyner, the daughter and co-heir of Thomas Poyner of Beslow. She had previously been married twice to Shropshire landowners: to James Barker of Haughmond Abbey and to Thomas Wolryche of Dudmaston Hall. She had children by both these earlier marriages.

Jerome Corbet and Dorothy Poyner probably married in the 1570s and had three surviving children.

- Anne Corbet married William Gatacre of Gatacre in the parish of Claverley, Shropshire.
- Roger Corbet, Jerome's heir, married Jane Banister of Upton, Leicestershire. He settled in Leicestershire and his branch of the Corbet family lasted until the mid-18th century.
- Robert Corbet, Jerome and Dorothy's younger son, settled at Beslow and died sine prole, leaving his property to his half-brother, Francis Wolryche of Dudmaston.

Jerome and Dorothy Corbet strongly disapproved of their daughter Anne's marriage to William Gatacre. The Gatacres were prominent recusants and the marriage signified to the Corbets defection from the true faith they had fought for to Roman Catholicism. Anne survived Jerome by about six years, and at the time she made her will the resultant disputes were still going on. Evidently they initially refused to make a marriage settlement on their daughter but had been forced to come to terms through a legal action by Gatacre. Nevertheless, Dorothy was determined to fight to the bitter end, quibbling over order of setting up Anne's jointure.

"And whereas Anne Gatacre mye Daughter was marryed withoute her Father's privitie or mine, and that alsoe sithence the marryage William Gatacre her Husband, commenced a suit against mee in the Chancerye without just cause, to mye great charges, in which suit it was by mye Lord Chancellor that nowe is, ordered with oure consent that I should make upp the summe which was paid William Gatacre before the said suit was begunne, £6oo in consideration whereof he should make mye daughter a joynture answerable to the said porcion, which was after agreed upon to be £60 a yeare, all whiche saide £6oo save £63 I have satisfied, but hee hathe made noe Joynture to her as yett. Nowe yf William Gatacre shall make to mye Executors or to suche persons as they like well of a Joynture according to the saide Order, then mye Executors shall paie to William Gatacre the saide summe of £63 for the whole porcion, but yf he refuses, they shall retaine the same, and by lawe cause him either to make the Joynture or returne the money he hathe alreadie received to th'end it may be sett forthe for the whole benefit of mye Daughter..."
