= Richard Corbet (died 1606) =

Member of the Parliament of England

Sir Richard Corbet (c.1545–1606) was an English landowner and politician of the Elizabethan period.

== Background and education ==
Richard Corbet the second son of

- Sir Andrew Corbet, son of Roger Corbet and Anne Windsor, of Moreton Corbet, Shropshire. The Corbets had an association with Shropshire stretching back to the Norman Conquest and centred on Moreton Corbet Castle, still a stronghold in the Tudor period. In the reign of Elizabeth I, they were at the head of the county's Protestant landed gentry. Sir Andrew was an energetic and able administrator, a member of the Council in the Marches of Wales for a quarter century and its leader and vice-president from 1574–77.
- Jane Needham, daughter of Sir Robert Needham of Shavington Hall, Shropshire.

His parents' marriage had been arranged by Sir Andrew's uncle, Richard Corbet, who acquired his wardship after the early death of Roger Corbet. Their first son was Robert. Richard was born in about 1545, two or three years after his brother. His name had been common in the Corbet family for generations but the choice might have been a tribute to his great-uncle Richard, who remained close to Sir Andrew and his family even after the wardship ended in 1543. Sir Andrew and Jane were to have four more sons and six daughters.

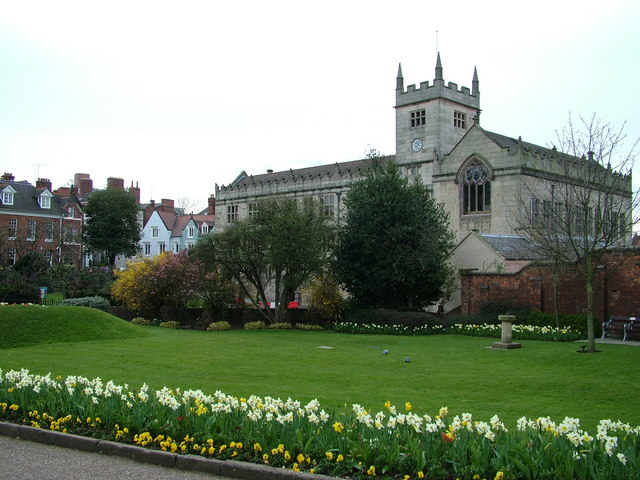
The former Shrewsbury School building, now the town's library. It is probable that Richard Corbet was educated at the school.

Richard Corbet was probably educated at Shrewsbury School. The family historian Augusta Corbet, maintained that:

"It was during this decade (the 1550s) that Sir Andrew's three elder sons were being polished by learning at the Shrewsbury School, where both scholars and Master were justly famous, and Shrewsbury was then as now proud of them. We find that 3s. 9d. was spent on some occasion "upon Mr Corbet's sones" and Mr. Aston. It was to the unremitting fostering care and his (Mr. Aston's) renown for learning that the School in great measure owed its first years of prosperity."

However, the school was not opened until 1552 and Ashton was not appointed until 1561, so it is unlikely that Richard studied under his headship for more than a couple of years, if at all. It is unclear from such scanty evidence which of Sir Andrew's sons studied at the school, although the argument for Richard being among the three mentioned is much stronger than for his elder brother. The Corbets had numerous links to the school. Reginald Corbet, another of Sir Andrew's uncles, had been a leading figure in agitating for its establishment. The first head, Thomas Ashton knew Sir Andrew well and wrote to Burghley praising him. The school had a Calvinist ethos and was the obvious place for Protestant gentry to send their sons: Philip Sidney was placed there by his father, Henry Sidney, the president of the Council in the Marches, and a close friend of the Corbets.

== Landowner ==
=== Lands and finance ===
Richard Corbet, as a younger son, was not destined to inherit the Corbet estates. He married Mary Morgan, daughter of Morgan Wolfe of Meriden, then in Warwickshire. Corbet is said to have adopted as his main residence Meriden, "which his first wife had received as her dower." However, this seems to rest on Augusta Corbet's construction of events, i.e. that he "lived chiefly at Meriden, where he had inherited his first wife's property in Warwickshire." The term dower generally refers to property signed over to a woman by her husband or his family. Corbet's wife, Mary, was the widow of Thomas Lee of Clattercote, Oxfordshire. It was Clattercote that was she held for life after her first husband's death, although the reversion was held by Lee's nephew, William Watson. Corbet bought the reversion from Watson in 1582, securing Clattercote for himself, should his wife die, and it was possibly their main residence. He later left it to his second wife, Judith Austin, for her life.

Corbet did buy one of the two manors called Alspath or Meriden, a property subsidiary to the main manor, which belonged to the Earls of Derby. This was in 1584, after he had inherited the Corbet estates from his brother. He must have lived there at least some of the time, and in 1585 was described by the Privy Council as "Richard Corbet of Meryden in the Countie of Warwick," although at the time he purchased it he was known as "Richard Corbett of Clattercote". The vendor was one William Foster, who had bought the manor some years earlier from the poet Edward Aglionby of Temple Balsall. The history of the ownership of the two Meriden manors, as collated in the Victoria County History, makes no mention of the Wolfe family, so they may simply have rented one of the several halls in Meriden.

Robert Corbet, Richard's older brother, died on 30 May 1583, having contracted bubonic plague while visiting their uncle Walter in London. As Robert had no male heirs, Richard succeeded him. He inherited from his brother property in many parts of Shropshire and manors in Bedfordshire, Buckinghamshire, Cornwall, Essex, and Herefordshire.

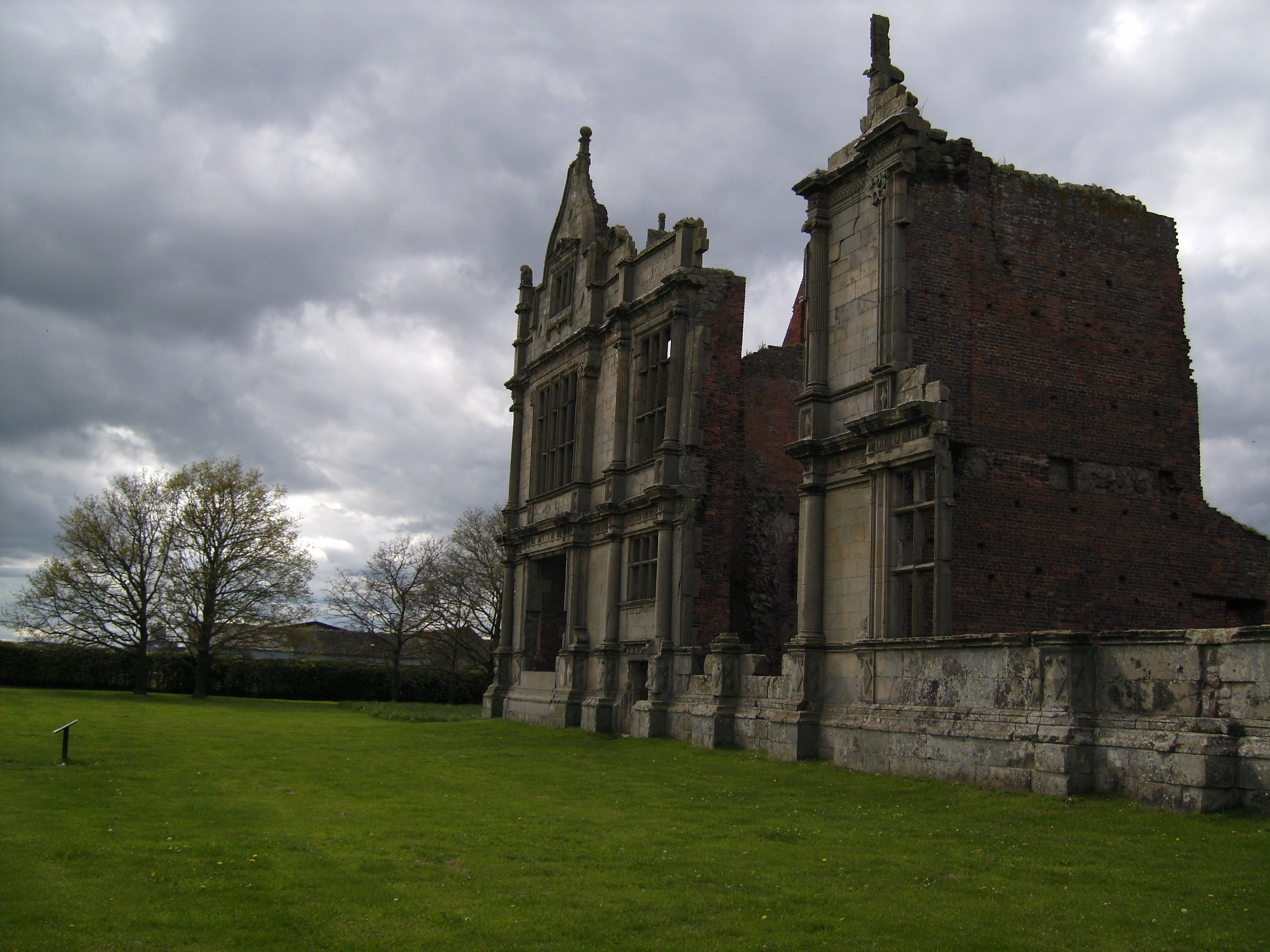
Remains of the mansion on the Italian model, begun by Robert Corbet and not completed by his impecunious brother Richard.

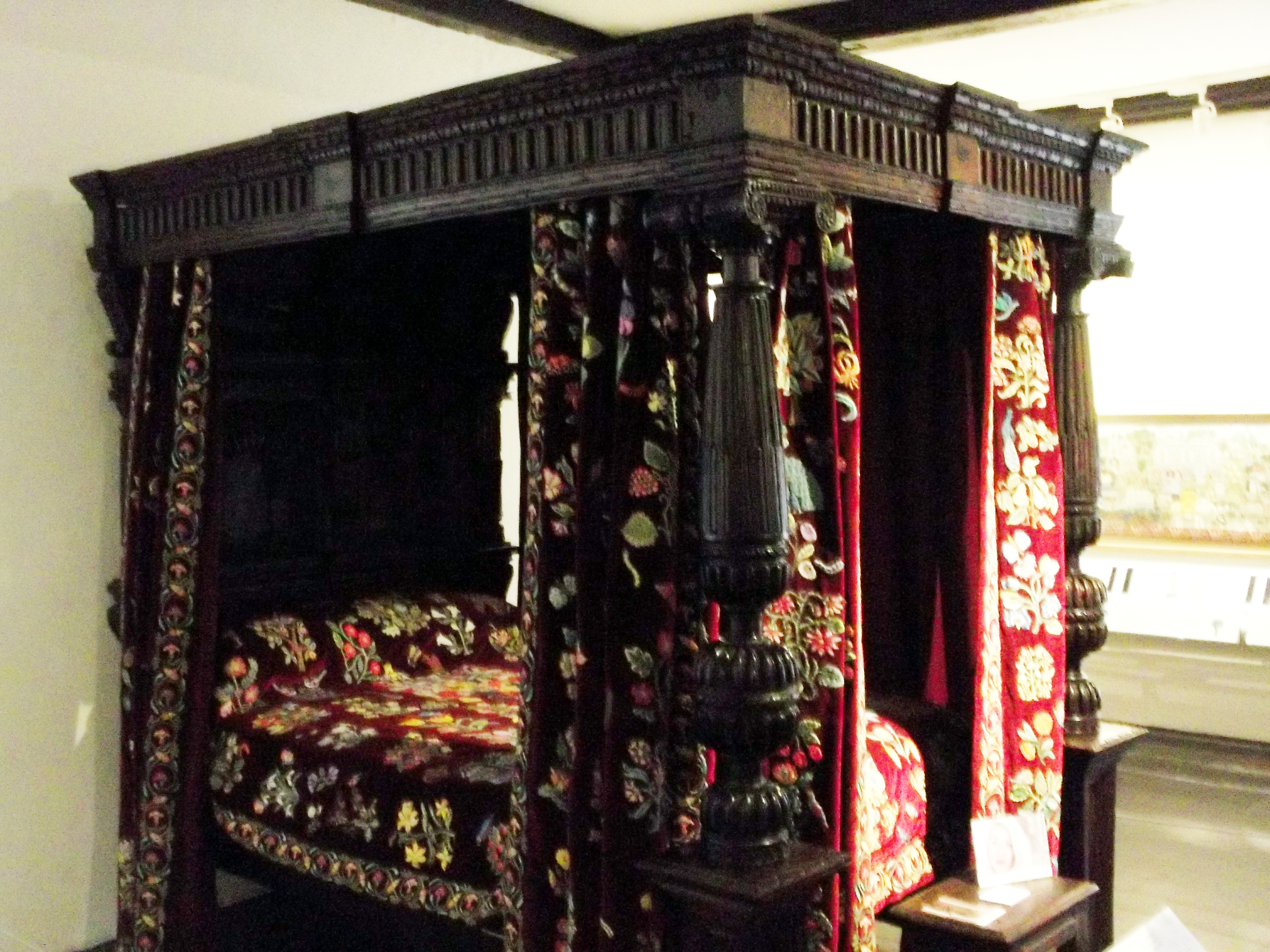
Bed, thought to belong to Richard Corbet. Textiles are modern replicas. Shrewsbury Museum and Art Gallery.

He also inherited and attempted, but failed to complete the unfinished Italianate extension his brother was building at Moreton Corbet castle. As Moreton Corbet must have been a large building site, his Shropshire residence seems to have been at nearby Shawbury: a letter from William Overton, the Bishop of Coventry and Lichfield, granting him permission to build a family chapel at Moreton Corbet parish church, addresses him as "Richard Corbet, Esq., of Shawbury Park".

It was typical of Corbet that he would start a new and costly project before he had finished the first. He was already in debt by the time he inherited. Although the estates were large, so were the calls on his resources, and he consistently overspent. His brother's two young daughters had to be married and large estates had to be committed in their settlements: Elizabeth, the eldest, took the newly acquired Meriden, among others, on her marriage to Sir Henry Wallop.

Corbet tried to improve his income and wealth by a range of methods. One was the pursuit of property disputes, particularly against William Watson, brother of the poet Thomas Watson. As well as Clattercote, his wife Mary had received the use for life of a number of other estates belonging to her deceased husband, Thomas Lee. Most important was the manor of Cropredy, which would revert on her death to Watson, to whom she had to pay an annual rent of £32 9s 10d. Corbet Challenged Watson's right to the manor doggedly through the courts, gaining ownership only in his later years.

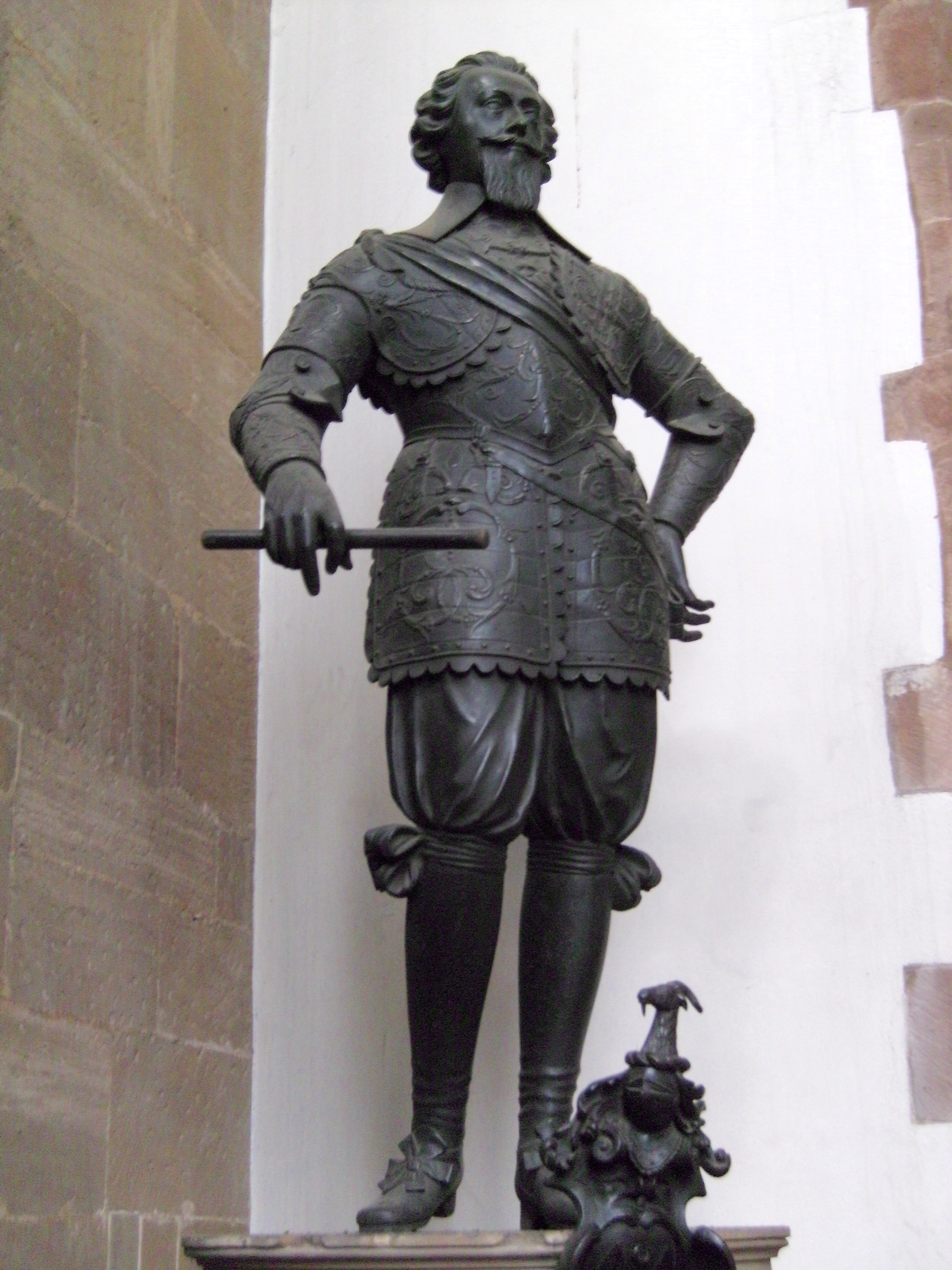
Statue of Vice Admiral Sir Richard Leveson (1570-1605) in St Peter's Collegiate Church, Wolverhampton. Corbet was friend of Leveson and tried to help him deal with his and his father's enormous debts, despite his own parlous financial situation.

Corbet also hoped for income through investment in industry. Walter Leveson of Lilleshall Abbey, his brother-in-law, was in deep financial difficulties because he had embarrassed the government by allowing his ships to attack allied Dutch and Danish vessels. In 1590 Corbet, together with Leveson's son, Richard, successfully petitioned the Privy Council to gain access him in the Wood Street Counter. In 1591, Robert Corbet and Vincent, his youngest brother, bought a 10-year lease on all Leveson's ironworks, furnaces, forges, and hammers in Shropshire. The aim was to ensure that Leveson's creditors were paid off more quickly. However, the venture backfired on them, as the Privy Council was not happy with the arrangement. In 1592, after Leveson absconded from gaol, the Council ordered the Corbets to come to a better accommodation with Leveson's creditors, forcing them to take a loan of £1000 to do so. Yet, in the same year, Richard gave the bailiffs of Shrewsbury venison to feast over 100 people.

=== Law and order ===
Corbet was appointed to posts consistent with his status in the county: Justice of the Peace (J.P.) for Shropshire in 1588, Deputy Lieutenant of the county in 1590, sheriff for 1592–93 and a member of the Council of the Marches of Wales in 1594.

In 1589 Corbet and his entourage attacked the house of a widow called Elizabeth Vernon, made off with her goods and cattle and laid waste her corn. As he had great power in the region, both formal and informal, the Privy Council wrote that "the poor widow feareth she shall not receive such good measure in justice for her repossessing and restitution as were requisite." They advised him to think "how deeply it would touch you in credit if this foul disorder be not speedily reformed." It was "an extraordinary episode for a gentleman of his standing," although not unique: it was the sort of behaviour indulged by coal and iron magnates of the region, like Lord Dudley and Gilbert Lyttelton.

Corbet could be zealous in enforcing the law. In 1591 he set out to deal with Walter Lea, who had been MP for Bridgnorth with his uncle Jerome Corbet in 1584. Issuing a warrant for the arrest of Lea and his accomplices, Thomas and Anthony Acton, the Privy Council described Lea as a "notoryus bad and evill disposed person." However, in 1585 Lea had come to the notice of the Council for his large debts to a widow called Mrs Knotesforth and for fraudulently getting her to assent to a deed of gift in his favour. Investigations at the time revealed that Corbet was one of a number of gentlemen in debt to Lea. He was ordered not to make any further payments to Lea before he was interviewed the Council. Lea was probably a Catholic, as the Actons certainly were, although he would have had to take the Oath of Supremacy in order to sit as an MP. He was in a good position to commit fraud, as he was a trained lawyer, a member of the Inner Temple. It is unclear whether Corbet was pursuing Lea disinterestedly or because he was a creditor.

In 1596, during a serious food shortage, Corbet was instructed by the Privy Council to clamp down on the brewing operations of two alehouses in Market Drayton, known as the Brethren. They were each using 20 strikes weekly of grain, which was said to be 50% more in local Shropshire measure than in London. As this "would serve for the relief of many poor people, Corbet was ordered to restrict their brewing to the minimum necessary for their customers and to forbid tippling and disorderly drinking in the said alehouses."

Despite the ambiguities in his record, Corbet was appointed Knight of the Order of the Bath on the accession of James I in 1603.

== Parliamentary career ==
Corbet was elected a Member (MP) of the Parliament of England for Shropshire in 1586. He was placed first in order of precedence over Walter Leveson, his brother-in-law. This was the second of three consecutive parliaments in which Leveson represented Shropshire. The knights of the shire were always drawn from a small circle of upper gentry families and the Corbets had been among them for centuries. The combined Corbet and Leveson families were more than a match for any competition, although there was never a contested election for Shropshire county seats in Elizabeth's reign.

Parliament had been summoned in September and assembled on 15 October. It lasted only until the following March. Nothing is known of Corbet's parliamentary work, but as first knight, he would have been the county's representative on the subsidy committee, a key financial body dealing with taxation. This was appointed on 22 February 1587.

== Death ==
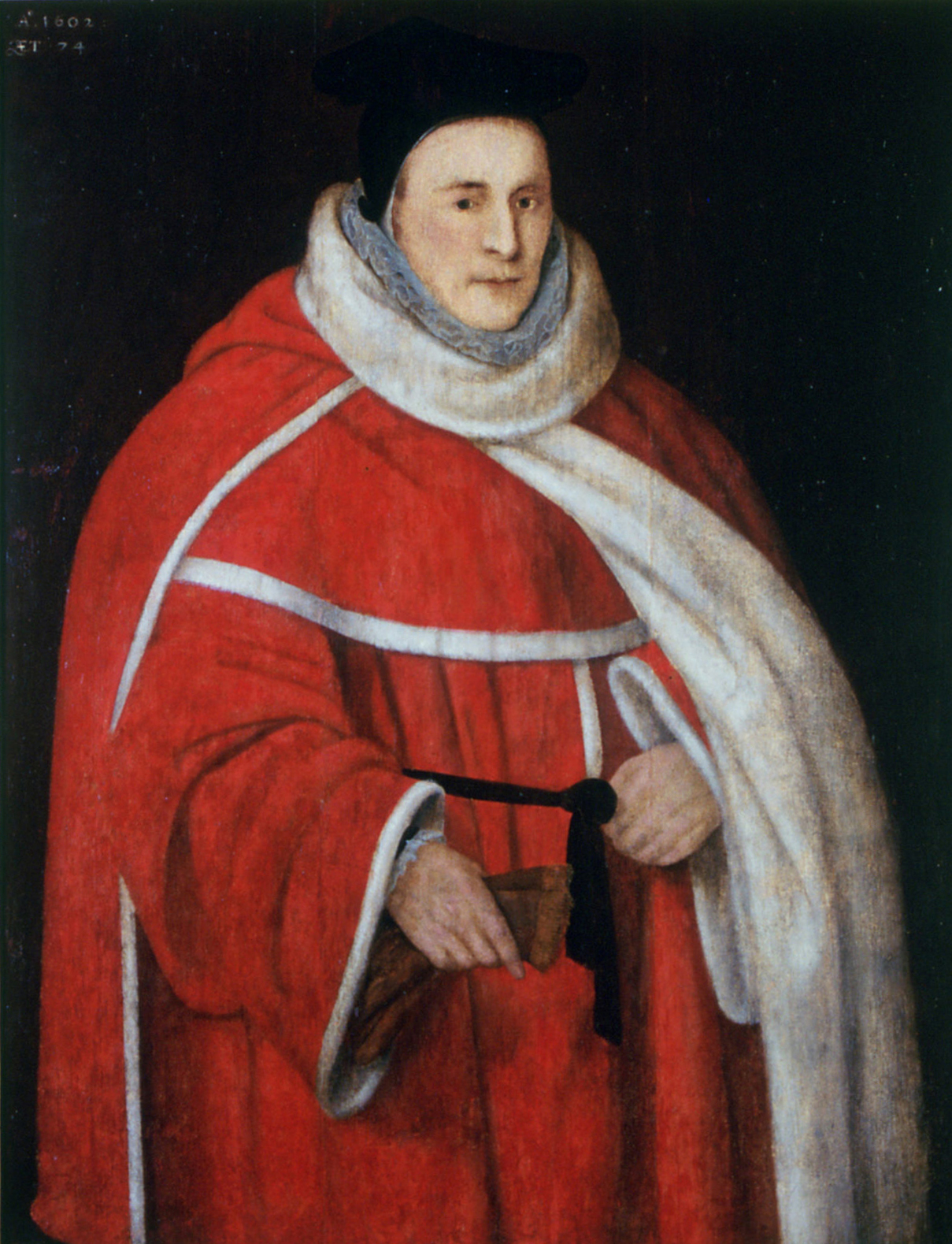
Sir John Popham, Lord Chief Justice of England, was elderly and very rich: an unlikely beneficiary of Corbet's will.

Corbet died in 1606 and was buried at Moreton Corbet. By the time of his death, he owed more than £5700.

His will, dated 12 July 1606, shows that among the largest of his debts was at least £800 owed to his own sister, Mary, in connection with his underwriting the debts of Richard Leveson. The document is a rambling litany of debts and attempts to set them right, interspersed by hugely extravagant gifts. He gave his second wife, Judith, £300 in recognition of her allowing him to supplement her jointure with tenants' leases, an expensive way to save money. The Corbets had always been generous to servants but Richard gave some of his as much as £30. Huge sums were given to relatives and friends: £300 to his nephew Robert and £400 to his niece Mary, £200 to Henry Corbet, a distant relative. He even gave £40 to "the Lord chief Justice of England, my Honorable Friend," presumably John Popham, who was famously wealthy Another £40 went to Roger Owen, another famously wealthy man: in March he had told parliament how he had profitably invested £300 in the Muscovy Company. After the excitement of spending, he concludes with a further list of debts: "Mistres Standen £1000, Sir Michael Hix £2000, Mr Thomas Spencer £400, Mr Morrall £400, Richard Way £500, Mistres Roads £400, Mr Thornes £200, Humfrey Lee my Cosen £150, Mistres Jane Bostok £140, J Culcupe £50, Mr Pilkington £50, Mr Cole £100, Mr Trist £100, Marye Corbet my Sister £200, Mr Sidley £100, Mr Tutchborne £100."

Corbet died without issue, but was optimistic to the end, in this as in financial matters. His will concluded with a memo, including the words:

"My Will is that if the child wherewith it hath pleased GOD to grant that my wife hath nowe conceived shall happen to be a Daughter I doe appointe £4000 to be paid her at 16 from all the rentes and of all my Manors."

In fact, his heir was his brother, Vincent Corbet, who already had a son to succeed him, Andrew Corbet.

== Marriages and family ==
Corbet had married twice:

- Mary Wolfe, the daughter of Morgan Wolfe of Meriden, Warwickshire and the widow of Thomas Lee of Clattercote, Oxfordahire. The marriage was without issue. Mary had considerable resources of her own as her jointure from her marriage to Lee. The date of her death is unknown.
- Judith Austin or Austen (1566-1640), the daughter of Thomas Austin of Oxley, Staffordshire, and Mary Cresswell.

Judith was twice widowed before marrying Corbet. Both these earlier husbands were drawn from the gentry of the Staffordshire/Derbyshire border. First was William Boothby (1564-1597) of Old Jewry, London, by whom she had two sons and at least one daughter, Elizabeth. Her second husband was William Basset (1551-1601) of Blore, Staffordshire, and Langley Meynell, Derbyshire. By Bassett she had a daughter, also Elizabeth. On the death of Bassett, Elizabeth was taken into wardship, which was purchased ultimately by Sir Walter Raleigh. He betrothed Elizabeth to his young son, also called Walter. He returned Elizabeth to her mother for a payment of £40 per annum. However, Raleigh was attainted in 1603 and, during her brief marriage to Corbet, Judith was struggling to get her daughter's wardship returned to her.

Judith was apparently pregnant when Corbet died, but the child must have miscarried or died shortly after birth, and Richard Corbet's brother Vincent inherited his estates, the marriage being without issue. However, Judith was still the ancestress of the remaining Corbet line, since Elizabeth Boothby, her daughter from her first marriage, married Vincent's son and heir, Andrew Corbet. Judith long outlived her husbands and chose to be buried at Blore, under effigies of herself, William Bassett and her daughter by him.
