= Richard Corbet (died 1566) =

English politician

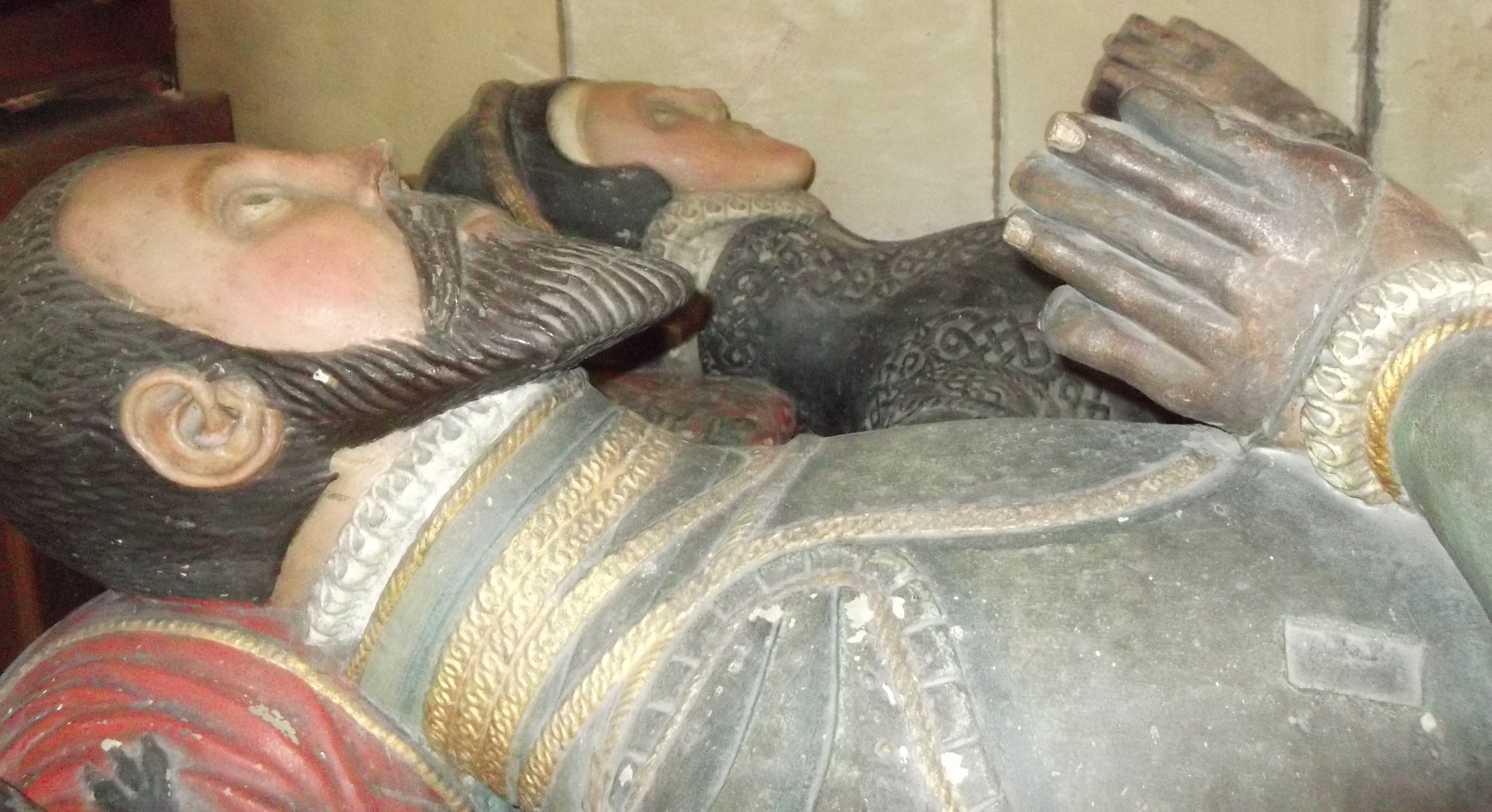
Effigies of Richard Corbet and Margaret Wortley, née Savile, his wife, in St Bartholomew's church, Moreton Corbet

Richard Corbet (by 1512–1566) was an English landowner and politician who represented Shropshire in the parliaments of 1558 and 1563.

== Background and early life ==
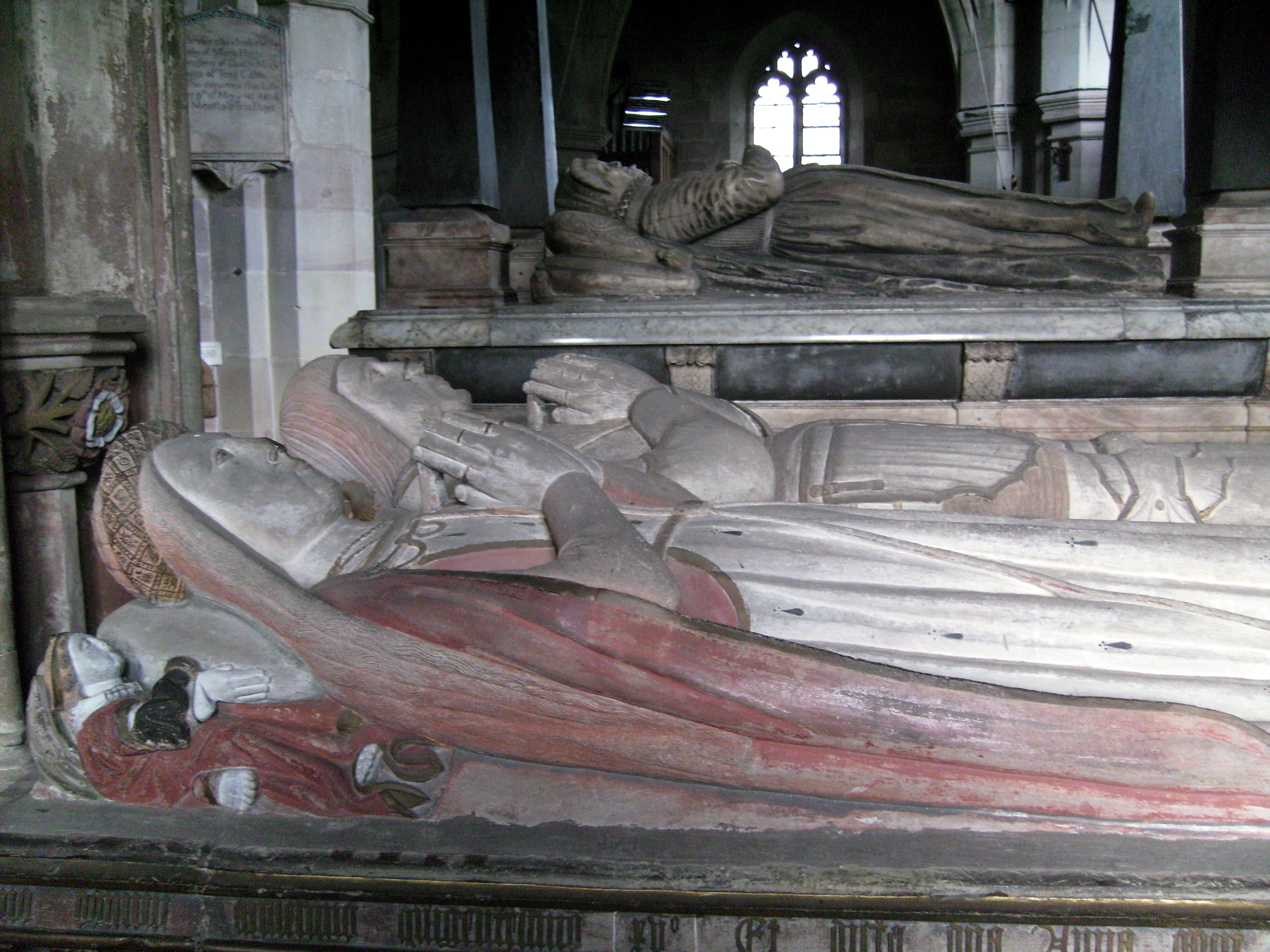
Tomb of Richard's maternal grandparents, Anne Talbot (died 1494) and Henry Vernon (died 1515) in St Bartholomew's church, Tong, Shropshire.

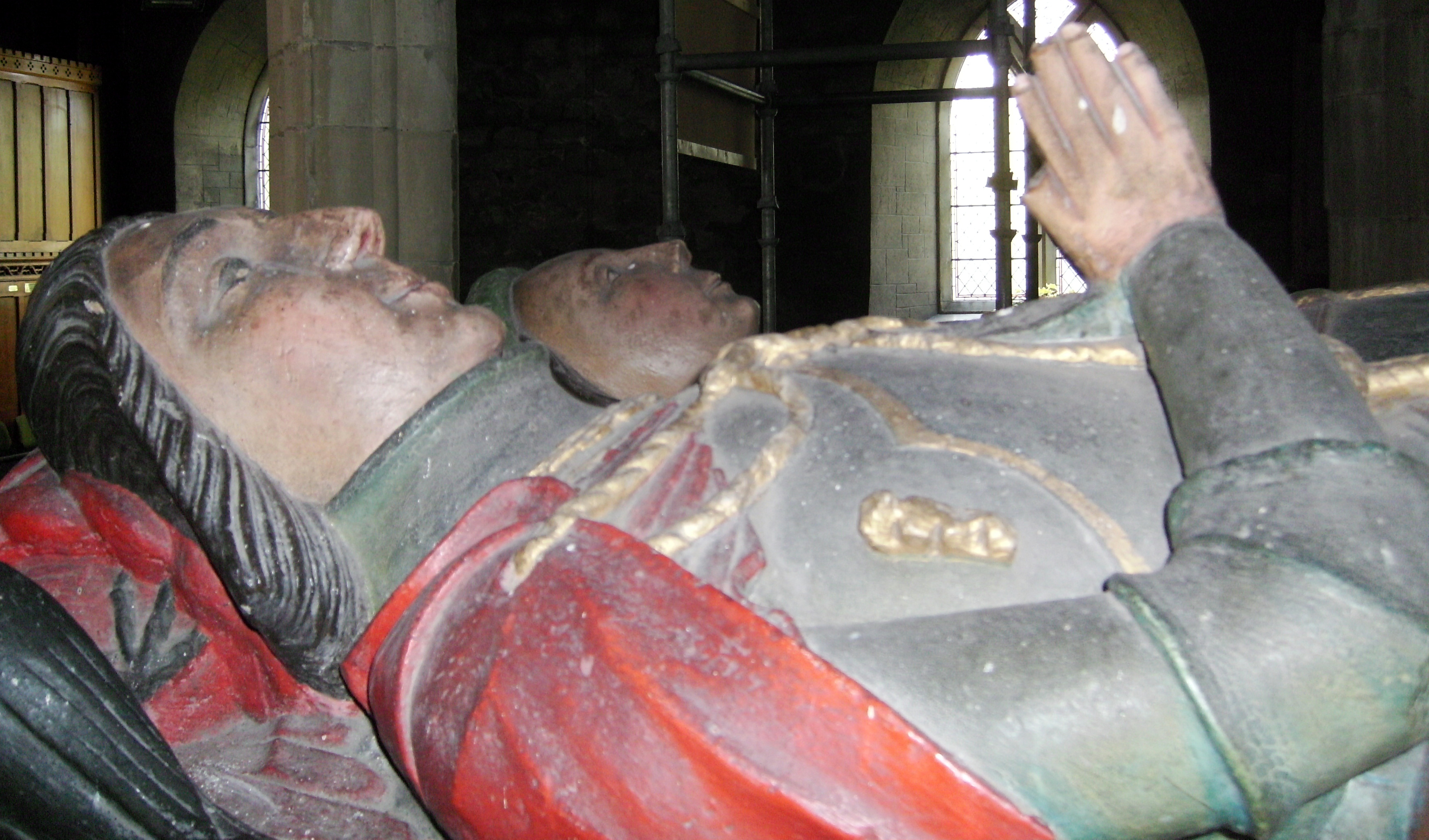
Effigy of Sir Robert Corbet, Richard's father, in St Bartholomew's church, Moreton Corbet

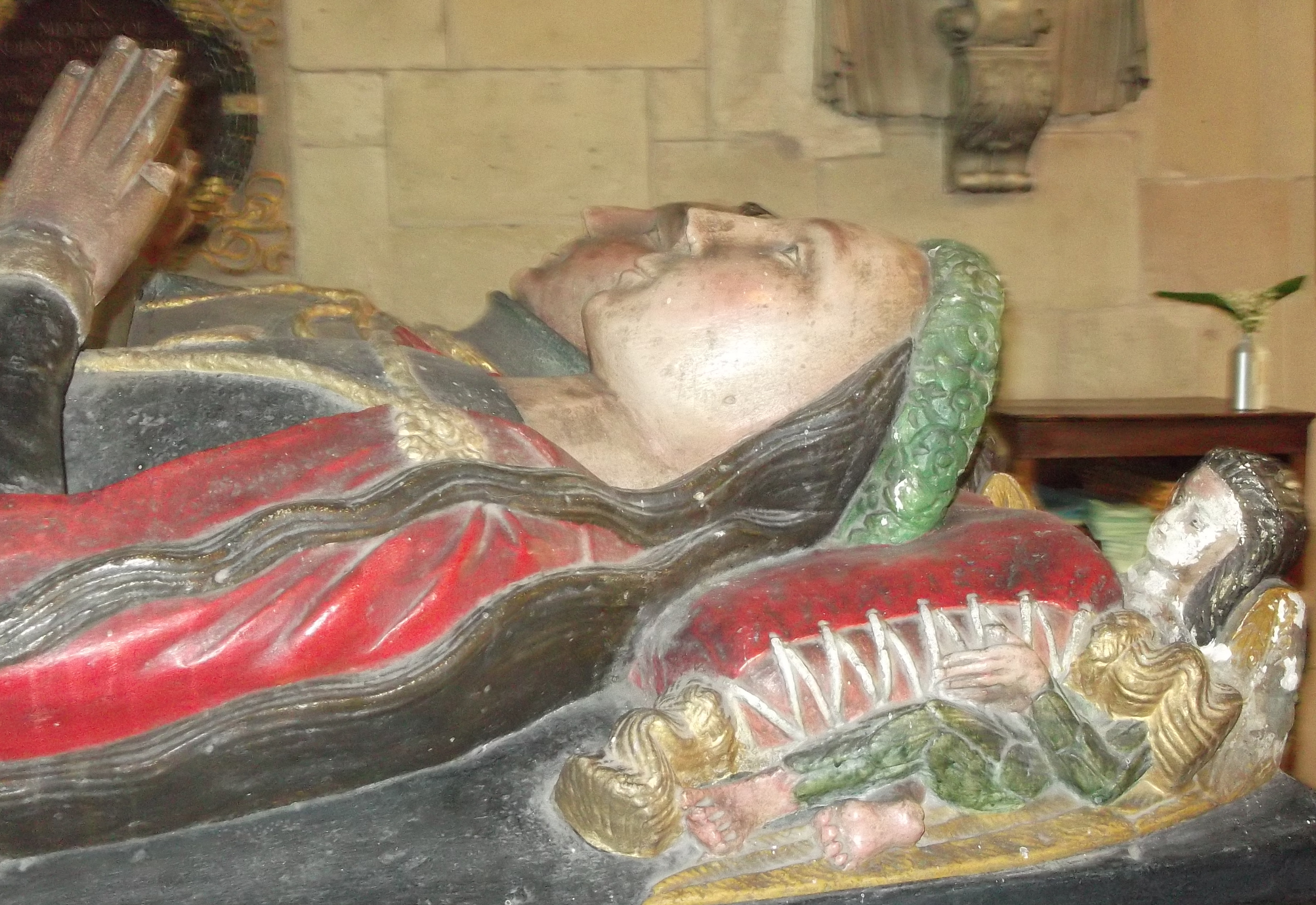
Effigy of Elizabeth Vernon, Richard Corbet's mother, who long outlived her husband, dying in 1563

Richard Corbet was the second son of

- Sir Robert Corbet (c. 1477 – 1513) of Moreton Corbet Castle in Shropshire. The Corbets were of Anglo-Norman descent and had lived in Shropshire for centuries, an important family locally and regionally in the Welsh Marches. They were never ennobled, and became part of the landed gentry class that monopolised representation of the Shropshire in the Parliament of England.

- Elizabeth Vernon (died 29 March 1563), daughter of Sir Henry Vernon of Haddon Hall and Tong and Anne Talbot, daughter of John Talbot, 2nd Earl of Shrewsbury. Elizabeth's father, Richard's grandfather had been treasurer to Arthur Tudor, the Prince of Wales. The Talbots were among the most powerful families in the country, with large estates on the western side of England.

Richard had two brothers. The elder and the heir to Sir Robert's estates was Roger Corbet (c. 1501 – 1538), MP for Borough of Truro in the English Reformation Parliament of 1529–36 The younger, Reginald Corbet, was a distinguished lawyer, Serjeant-at-law and Justice of the King's Bench, who represented Much Wenlock in 1542 and Shrewsbury in the parliaments of 1545, October 1553 and 1555. Richard also had four sisters who survived their parents: Jane, Joan or Anne, Mary and Dorothy. All married into the local landed gentry.

Sir Robert died on 11 April 1513. His will made generous provision for his daughters, guaranteeing them their keep and 100 marks each their marriages, while Roger was to inherit all his estates and half of his cattle and household goods, together with "my best salt with the covering, my best piece of silver with the covering, my best goblet and half my spoons." However, nothing specific was left for Richard and Reginald, who were perforce to make their careers elsewhere.

== Political and military career ==
Richard Corbet's career progressed through the dual avenues of the Court and marriage. Initially he became a member of the Royal Household of Henry VIII. Although he is not recorded as occupying a senior position, his contacts at court were probably the key to acquiring a number of grants. The first was small: in 1538 the lease of the rectory of Stone, Staffordshire from the Court of Augmentations. However, hen came the wardship of Andrew Corbet, his young nephew, after the death of Roger Corbet in 1538, a move which greatly enhanced his position in family and within the wider society. The grant was confirmed in July 1539.

In 1544 Corbet was a standard-bearer in Henry VIII’s last French war, the northern front of the Italian War of 1542–46. The fighting was frustrating from the English point of view, although the English invasion allowed the armies of Charles V, Holy Roman Emperor, to make rapid progress against the French. Despite this prominent military service, there is no certain evidence that Richard Corbet was ever knighted. The family historian Augusta Corbet struggled hard to marshal the evidence that he might have been and he is often referred to as Sir Richard. However, the consensus is otherwise.

From 1544 until the end of Henry's reign in 1547, Corbet was an important functionary in the household of the Prince of Wales, the future Edward VI, occupying the post of Carver. It was during this period that he married Margaret, daughter of Sir John Savile of Thornhill, Yorkshire. She was the widow of Thomas Wortley of Wortley, who died in 1545, and whose house at Wortley now became one of Corbet's homes. When in Shropshire he resided in his mother's home at Poynton, south of Moreton Corbet, on the River Roden, Shropshire. Either through his wife or through purchase, Corbet acquired substantial holdings in Yorkshire and he was to become prominent in the affairs of both his home counties and regions. It has been claimed that he was the Sir Richard Corbet imprisoned for a time in the Tower of London as a suspected supporter of Lady Jane Grey. However, this rests on the probably untrue supposition that he was knighted. It is also unlikely that he would have become a Justice of the Peace in both Shropshire and the West Riding of Yorkshire in 1554 under Queen Mary if his fundamental loyalty had been quite so open to question.

Corbet probably was a Protestant sympathiser from an early stage in the English Reformation: certainly he quickly became a trusted member of the key institutions of power in both his regions during the reign of Elizabeth I. As earl as December 1558 the queen made him a member of the Council of the North, which was headed by Francis Talbot, 5th Earl of Shrewsbury, his friend and distant cousin but a known religious conservative. After serving under Henry Manners, 2nd Earl of Rutland from 1560, he was declared ‘meet to continue in office’ on the succession of Ambrose Dudley, 3rd Earl of Warwick to the presidency of the North in 1564. In the same year he was reported as a "favourer of religion", that is, a reliable Protestant. He was also appointed to the Council of Wales and the Marches in 1560, the year he was also pricked to be High Sheriff of Shropshire. Membership of both councils was an unusual distinction.

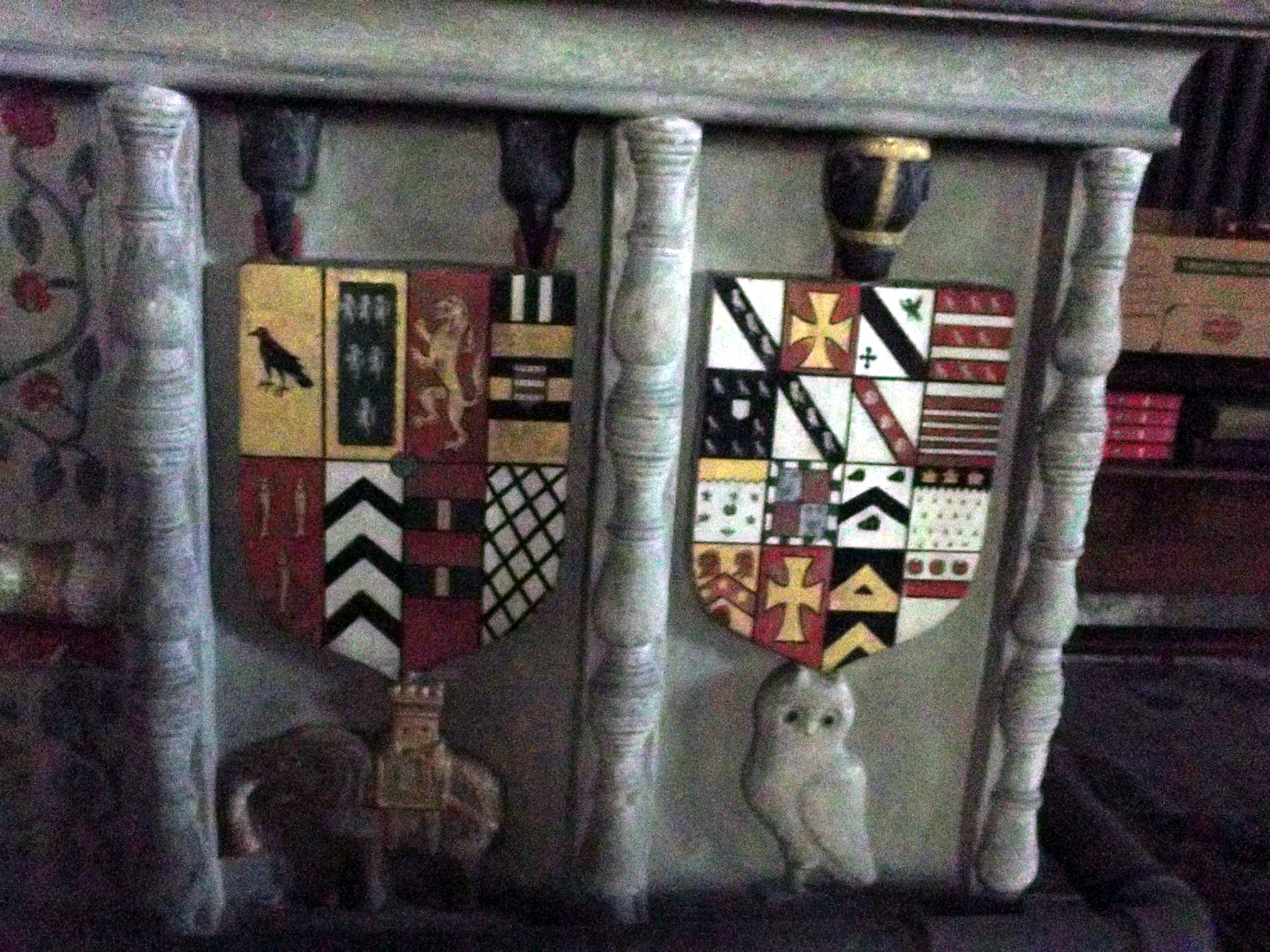
Arms and emblems on the Corbet/Savile tomb. These include the elephant, only adopted in the time of Sir Andrew, and the raven, referring to the etymology of Corbet, meaning "little crow".

Corbet was a Member (MP) of the Parliament of England for Shropshire in 1558 and 1563. Although the Council in Wales and the Marches was a dominant force politically, it seems that knights of the shire were largely elected because of their local standing and family connections. There were no contested elections for the Shropshire seats in Elizabeth's reign. Corbet's colleague in the parliament of 1558 was Thomas Fermor: although he had connections in Shropshire, he was a wealthy London merchant who later became noted as staunch Catholic. In 1563 Corbet was accompanied to Westminster by Edward Leighton, a conscientious administrator and a member of the Council in Wales and the Marches. When he died in 1566, he was succeeded as MP for Shropshire by his great-nephew, Robert Corbet, Sir Andrew's eldest son and heir.

== Death ==
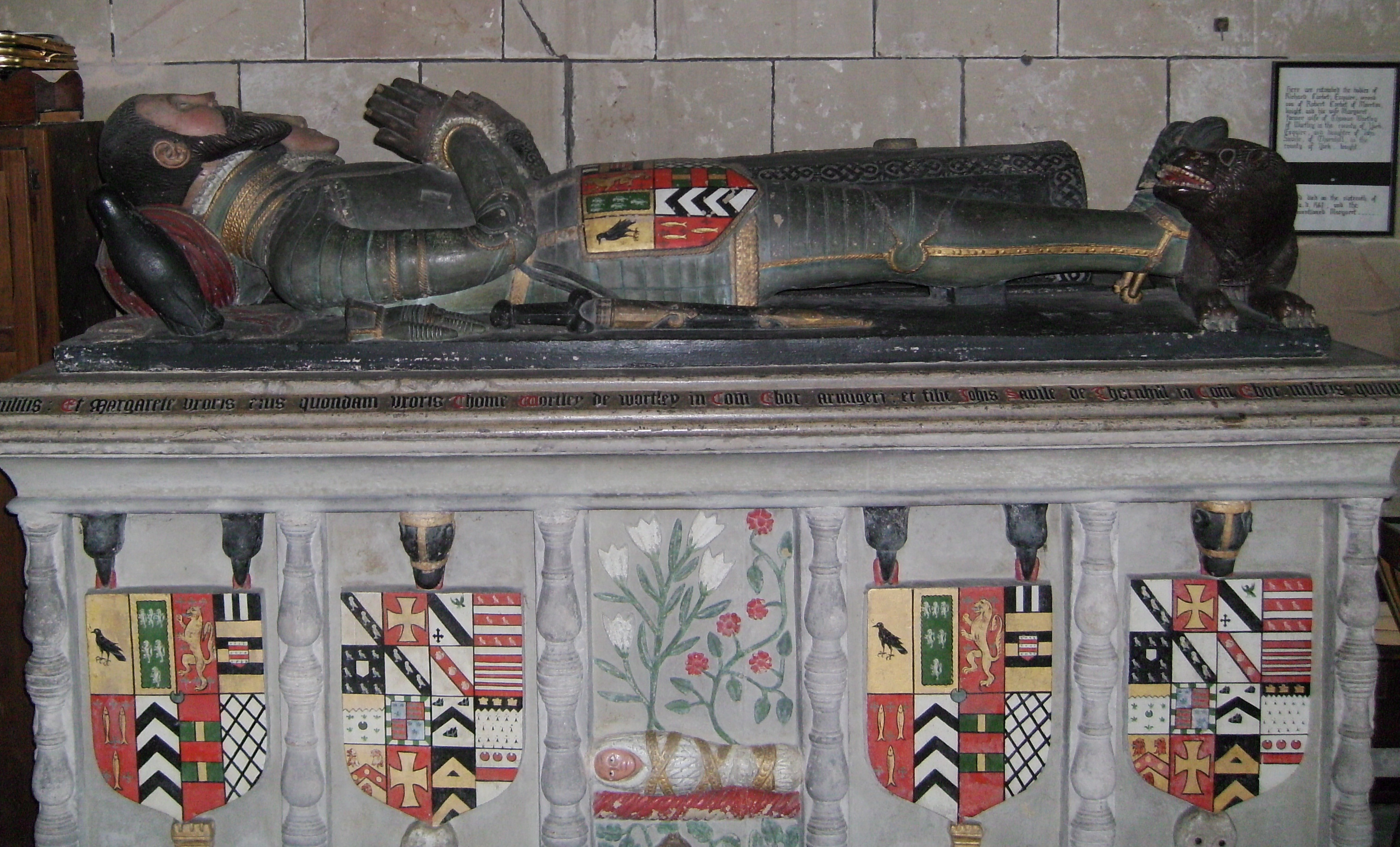
Tomb of Richard Corbet and his wife, Margaret, in St Bartholomew's Church, Moreton Corbet

Richard Corbet died in July 1566. He was buried in St Mary's, the parish church of Shawbury. This suggests that he died at Poynton, as in his will he asked to for "my body to be buried in some parish church near to the place where it shall please God to take me to his mercy": Shawbury lies between Poynton and Moreton Corbet. However, his memorial, in the form of an altar tomb for himself and his Margaret, his wife, was installed at St Batholomew's, the parish church of Moreton Corbet, only a few yards north of the castle.

Corbet had no surviving children, although a son may have predeceased him. His nephew and former ward, Sir Andrew Corbet inherited his Shropshire property, including the house that had become his at Poynton after his mother's death in 1563, and land at Acton Reynald, near Shawbury. Stone went to Andrew's son, Richard Corbet (died 1606). His Yorkshire estates of Carleton and Swinton had already been settled on Francis Wortley, his wife’s son by her first marriage and the ancestor of the Wortley Baronets. Small bequests were made to other nephews and he was careful to ensure that his oldest servants were secured in their tenancy and others were given three month's wages. He appointed his wife as executrix and gave a gilt cup to his brother Reginald, asking him to lend his legal skills to Margaret.
