= Thomas Ashton (schoolmaster) =

Thomas Ashton (died 29 August 1578, Cambridge) was an English clergyman and schoolmaster, the first headmaster of Shrewsbury School.

== Life ==
=== Identification ===
Ashton was originally identified with the Thomas Ashton who was educated at Cambridge University, where he graduated B.A. in 1559–60, and M.A. in 1563 This man was elected a fellow of Trinity College in 1562 and entered holy orders. This was the accepted identity of the first head master of Shrewsbury School at the time his sketch was written by Thompson Cooper for the first edition of the Dictionary of National Biography (1885). John Venn's Alumni Cantabrigienses gave in its entry of him an approximate lifespan of 1537–1578.

However he was later identified by J.B. Oldham in 1935 with an earlier Thomas Ashton who graduated from St John's College, Cambridge as B.A. in 1520, M.A. in 1521 and B.Th. (Bachelor of Theology) in 1531. He was elected fellow of the college in 1520, of which he was still serving in 1542, and holding a benefice as a clergyman in the Diocese of Lincoln. Oldham's argument was based on the likely age of the earlier candidate against the later candidate, who "could not have been born earlier" than 1540, and would therefore have been an improbably young 21 at being appointed headmaster and 38 at his death, that a letter from the Bailiffs of Shrewsbury to St John's College referred to Ashton as being of that College, and Oldham thought it unlikely for a Trinity man to have turned the control of Shrewsbury School over to another Cambridge College he had not grown up in.

This identification was accepted by 2004 when Martin E. Speight published his article on Ashton in the Oxford Dictionary of National Biography.

=== Shrewsbury School ===
In 1562 he was appointed the first head master of Shrewsbury School. In April 1561, Thomas Bentham, Bishop of Lichfield had requested the Archbishop of Canterbury, Matthew Parker, to license Ashton's non-residence at a parish living that was apparently away from Shrewsbury on the grounds restraining him would damage the progress of the school's foundation and that he was the only licensed preacher in the town.

Ashton raised Shrewsbury to a high position: while he was headmaster, there were as many as 290 pupils at a time. Among his pupils were Philip Sidney and Fulke Greville. The school drew pupils from sons of gentry in surrounding counties, the furthest being from Buckinghamshire and half the boys were boarded at homes in the town.

At Whitsuntide 1568 a noble stage play, in which Ashton was the principal actor, was performed at Shrewsbury in connection with the school. It lasted all the holidays, and was attended by a large number of people, including several noblemen and many gentry residing in the neighbourhood. Soon afterwards, however, in the same year Ashton resigned the mastership of the school.

William Camden, in his Britannia (begun 1577), remarked that "Shrewsbury is inhabited both by Welsh and English, who speak each other's language; and among other things greatly to their praise is the grammar school founded by them, the best filled in all England, whose flourishing state is owing to provision made by its head master, the excellent and worthy Thomas Ashton."

=== Post school headship career ===
From 1571, Ashton was in the service of Walter Devereux, 1st Earl of Essex until the latter's death in 1576. He supervised Essex's affairs during absences from his English estates and was tutor to his son Robert. In 1573 he was appointed as clergyman to the living of Haversham, Buckinghamshire.

About October 1574 he was sent to Ireland to Essex, who despatched him to negotiate with Tyrlough Lynagh, and subsequently employed him in confidential communications with Queen Elizabeth I and the Privy Council of England. Ashton returned to England in 1575. Essex's will left Ashton £40 a year for life, and he was one of the feoffees of the earl's estates.

In his last year, Ashton returned to Shrewsbury, where he was engaged in drawing up the ordinances for the government of Shrewsbury School, which remained in force until 1798, giving the Shrewsbury borough bailiffs the power to appoint the school's masters, with St John's College having an academic veto. The 'godlie Father,' as he is styled in a contemporary manuscript, preached a farewell sermon to the inhabitants, then returned to Cambridge, in or near which town he died a fortnight later, in 1578.
