= Sir John Corbet, 1st Baronet, of Stoke upon Tern =

English politician

Sir John Corbet, 1st Baronet of Stoke upon Tern (baptised 20 May 1594 – July 1662) was an English politician who represented Shropshire in the House of Commons of the long Parliament. As a moderate Puritan, he was noted before the English Civil War for his campaigns against extra-parliamentary taxation, and for waging a long running dispute over control of his parish church at Adderley which led to his imprisonment. He was a notable member of the Shropshire county committee, responsible for pursuing the war against the royalists. As a part of a Presbyterian middle group in Parliament, he was one of those secluded from parliament by Pride's Purge, and was stripped of his remaining public offices after the Restoration.

== Background ==
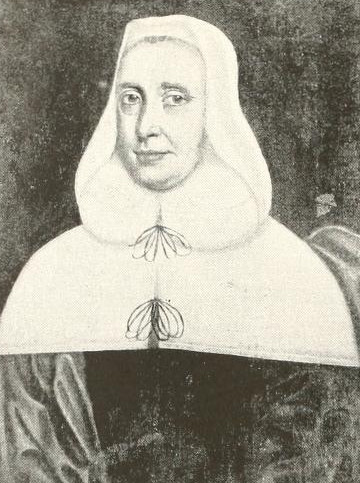
Reginald Corbet of Stoke upon Tern (died 1566), a prominent English judge of the mid-Tudor period and Sir John Corbet's paternal grandfather.

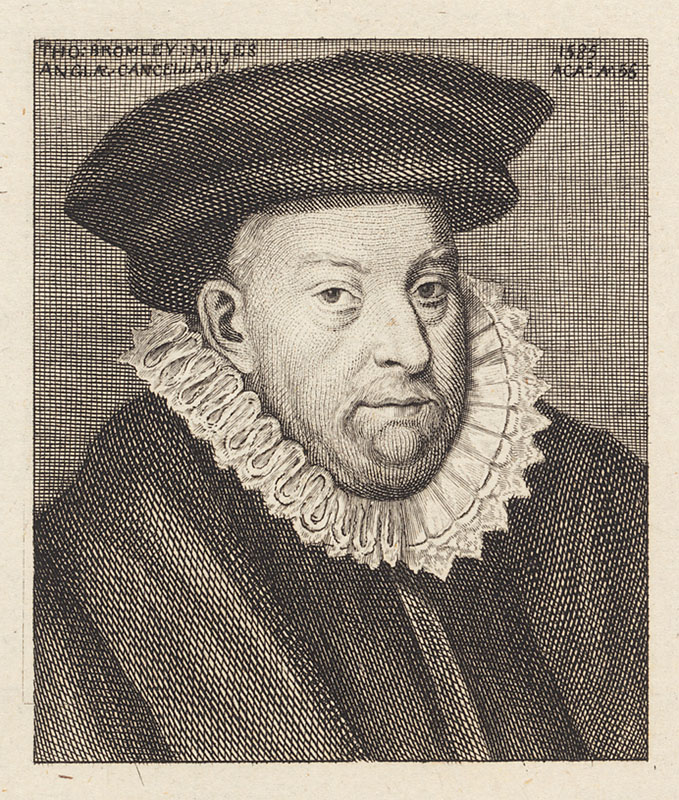
Thomas Bromley, Lord Chancellor 1579–1587, Sir John Corbet's maternal grandfather.

John Corbet's background was in the landed gentry of Shropshire, a county which had no resident aristocracy in the 16th century. Both his parents were drawn from sections of the Protestant gentry enriched by the law, commerce, and contacts at Court. They were:

- Richard Corbet of Stoke upon Tern and Adderley, Shropshire. The Stoke and Adderley branch of the Corbet family was descended from the Corbets of Moreton Corbet Castle, Shropshire. It was founded by the important judge, Reginald Corbet (c.1513-1566), Richard's father and John's grandfather. Reginald had secured the material prosperity of his family not only through his legal practice but by marrying a niece and heiress of the immensely wealthy businessman Rowland Hill (MP), the first Protestant Lord Mayor of London. The major family holdings in north Shropshire all came from Hill's bequest.

- Anne Bromley, daughter of Sir Thomas Bromley, who was from Hodnet, also the birthplace of Rowland Hill. Bromley was another distinguished lawyer, Lord Chancellor from 1579 to 1587, who presided over the trial of Mary, Queen of Scots. He became very rich and bought large estates in Montgomeryshire and Worcestershire, as well as in his native county.

The family tree below shows Sir John Corbet's immediate ancestry and relationship to other Corbet family members of political importance from the English Reformation to the Civil War.

Sir John Corbet: his ancestry and relatives

Sir Robert Corbet (d.1513) of Moreton Corbet	Elizabeth Vernon (d.1563)
Anne Windsor	Roger Corbet of Moreton Corbet and Linslade	Richard Corbet of Poynton	Margaret Savile	Reginald Corbet of Stoke	Alice Gratewood
Jane Needham	Sir Andrew Corbet of Moreton Corbet	Robert Corbet of Stanwardine	Jane Kynaston	Jerome Corbet of Beslow	Dorothy Poyner	Richard Corbet	Anne Bromley
Robert Corbet (died 1583)	Richard Corbet (died 1606)	Judith Austin	William Boothby	Sir Vincent Corbet	Frances Humfreston	Richard Corbet	SIR JOHN CORBET, 1st Baronet, of Stoke	Anne Mainwaring
Elizabeth Boothby	Sir Andrew Corbet, Parliamentarian	Margaret Corbet	Thomas Corbet of Stanwardine	Richard Corbet (died 1649)	Sir John Corbet, 2nd Baronet, Cavalier
Sarah Monson	Sir Vincent Corbet, 1st Baronet, Cavalier	Elizabeth Ludlow	Robert Corbet of Stanwardine, lawyer and Parliamentarian

== Early life and education ==
John Corbet was baptised at Stoke upon Tern on 20 May 1594. He was his parents' second son. His elder brother, Richard, was his father's heir, and he had also a younger brother, Thomas.

Their father died in 1601 and Richard, the eldest, succeeded to the family estates. John was probably given the education traditionally afforded by the Corbets to younger sons: university followed by legal training. A John Corbet is known to have graduated BA at Cambridge University in 1612, and this may be him. He was certainly a student at Lincoln's Inn in 1615.

Richard, John's elder brother, had married Anne Weld, a daughter of Humphrey Weld, a powerful merchant who was Lord Mayor of London in 1608. They had two sons before Richard died in 1615: Richard and Humphrey. Richard survived his father but Humphrey seems to have predeceased him. The inquisition post mortem, held at Bridgnorth, noted that should the young Richard die without heirs, the estates would go to his uncle John or, failing that, his uncle Thomas. However, by the terms of the will, dated 2 May 1612, the estates were put into trust. The proceeds were to be used primarily to settle his debts and the administrators should "at the end of the seven years, give an Accompt unto such person or persons as shall stand and be rightfullie seized of my Estate". Young Richard was granted an annuity of £50 for life, "provided that he surrender all his Claime to the lands and hereditaments aforesaid." The reasons for this unusual provision are unknown, although some form of congenital disability is a possible explanation. John was the sole executor of the will and by 1618 had emerged as successor to his brother's estates. Neither his nephew Richard, who lived until 1649, nor Anne Weld, who subsequently remarried, ever challenged John Corbet's succession.

In 1620 John Corbet married Ann Mainwaring of Ightfield, an estate to the west of Adderley. It is not known when Corbet was knighted, but he was created a baronet on 19 September 1627. He was made a justice of the peace and was pricked High Sheriff of Shropshire for 1628 to 1629. However these were years of increasing political tension and Corbet moved decisively into opposition to the absolutist policies of Charles I and his ministers.

== Campaigns against absolutism ==
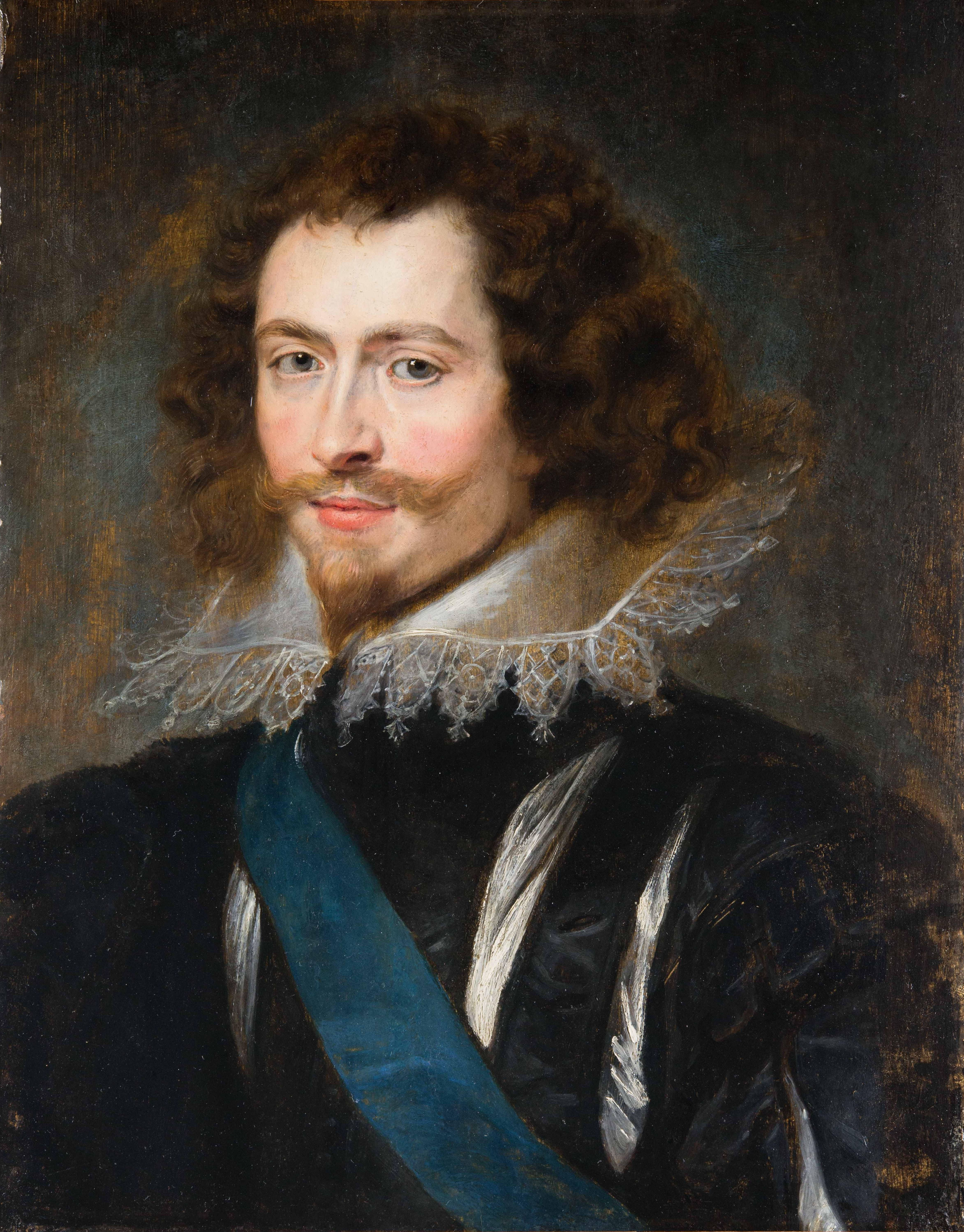
George Villiers, 1st Duke of Buckingham, chief adviser of Charles I until his assassination in 1628, was mainly responsible for the extra-parliamentary taxation opposed by Corbet.

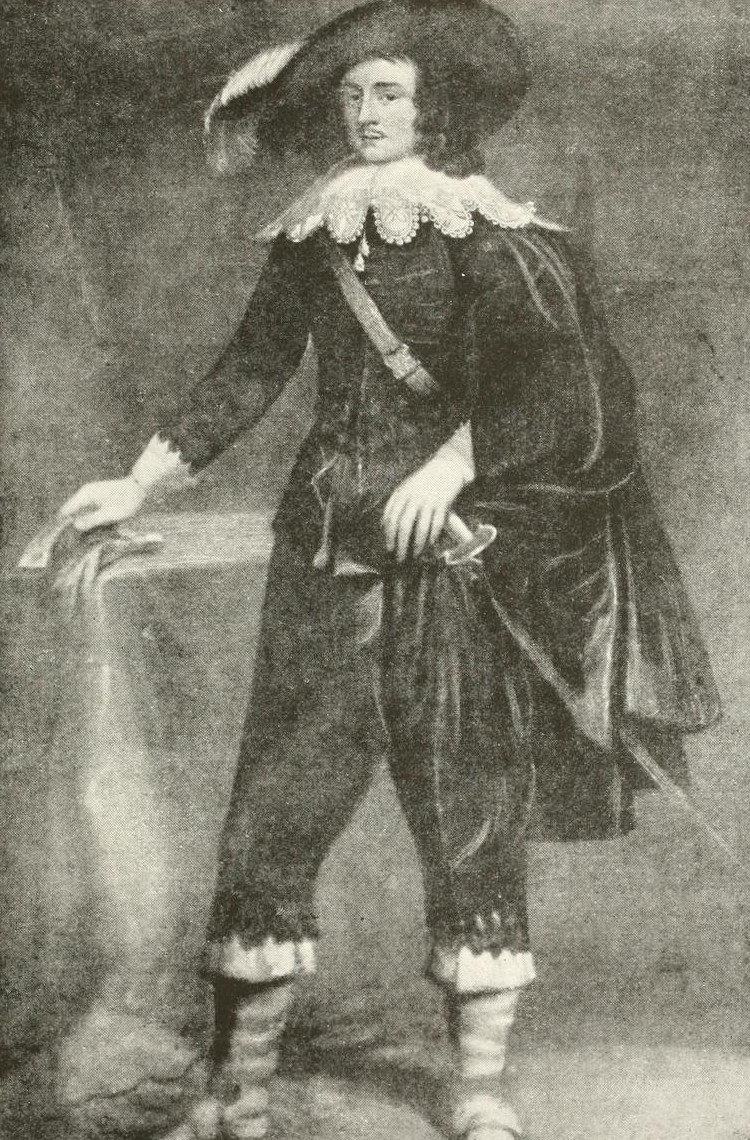
Sir Andrew Corbet of Moreton Corbet, a relative of Sir John, was responsible for collecting the Forced Loan but later turned against the king's absolutist policies and the influence of Buckingham.

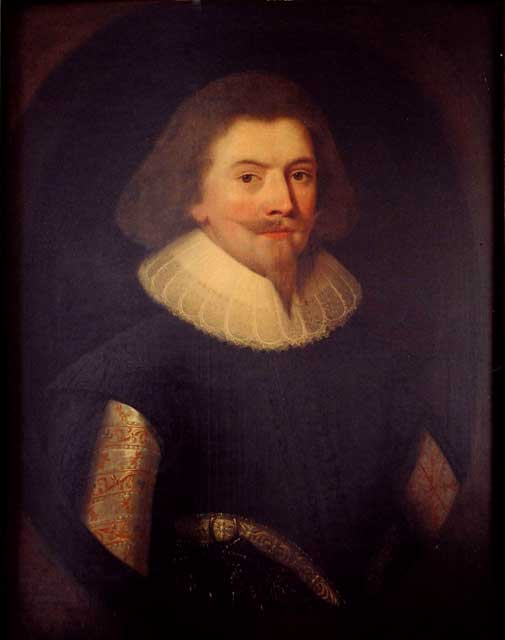
John Egerton, 1st Earl of Bridgewater, one of the Shropshire gentry ennobled by the Stuart kings, was Lord Lieutenant of the county and was held responsible for Corbet's imprisonment, narrowly escaping impeachment.

In 1627 Corbet led the opposition within Shropshire to the Forced Loan imposed by the King. The parliament of 1625, dubbed by Court circles the Useless Parliament had refused fully to underwrite the cost of the Anglo-Spanish War of 1625–30. As Buckingham's inept diplomacy turned it into a war also against France, Charles imposed a levy without parliamentary consent. Corbet was outspoken in his attacks on the Forced Loan. The collection in Shropshire was carried out by the commissioner Sir Andrew Corbet of Moreton Corbet, under the direction of William Compton, 1st Earl of Northampton, president of the Council in the Marches of Wales, and was remarkably successful. By promising to use some of it to pay arrears of "coat and conduct" money, already owed to local gentry and their retainers for military service, Corbet overcame their initial reluctance to pay. Shropshire paid the Exchequer £2,997 - 82% per cent of its quota, compared with the national average of 72%. However, Sir John Corbet's agitation seems to have struck a chord with his cousin, Sir Andrew. His compliance ended with the collection of the Forced Loan and he joined Sir John in opposition, voting for the Petition of Right in the parliament of 1628.

Corbet took up essentially the same issue during the 11-year period of absolute monarchy, known as Thorough, which succeeded Charles I's resolution to do without parliament. In 1634 he strongly criticised the levying of Ship money, another tax imposed by the king without parliamentary consent. A vigorous debate took place on 7 April 1635 at the quarter sessions in Shrewsbury over the issue of the Crown's right to levy charges to pay the muster-master, who trained the county militia. The grand jury described the charges as "a great greevance and oppression". This was immediately countered by Timothy Tourneur, a Gray's Inn barrister, Master in Chancery, and steward to John Egerton, 1st Earl of Bridgewater the Lord Lieutenant of Wales, whose office covered Shropshire. Tourneur condemned the grand jury for meddling in matters beyond their remit. Corbet and Robert Charlton of Apley intervened to defend the jury and to attack Tourneur. Corbet demanded that Clerk of the Peace read out the section of the statute book referring to the Petition of Right. Although Corbet's stand had the support of most of the justices present, it was reported to the Privy Council of England through Bridgewater. Corbet was summoned before the council and accused of "making speeches to his Majesties disservice and the animating of others to refuse the payment of the muster master's fee." As he maintained his stand, he was imprisoned on 10 June, pending trial in Star Chamber. However, he was incarcerated in the Fleet Prison for six months but never brought to trial. Charlton, his fellow dissident, escaped with two days in gaol.

Corbet's determined opposition to extra-parliamentary taxation earned him the sobriquet "the Patriot". In June 1641 the Commons vindicated Corbet's position, resolving:

That the Imposition of Thirty Pounds per annum, laid upon the Subjects of the County of Salop, for the Mustermaster's Fee, by the Earl of Bridgewater, Lord Lieutenant of that County, is an illegal Charge, and against the Petition of Right. The House declared Corbet's detention was illegal and that he should be recompensed by those who signed the warrant. It referred the matter to the Lords, who in December decided to impeach Bridgewater, although they did not go through with it.

== The Adderley church dispute ==
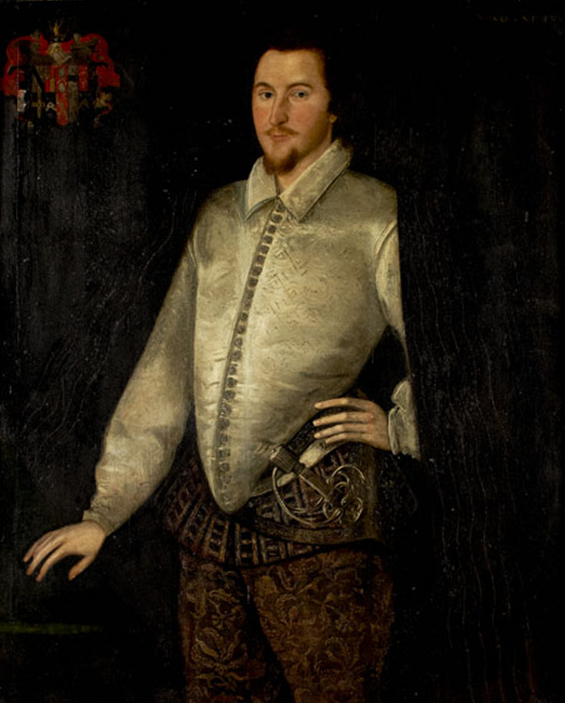
Sir Robert Needham in 1598

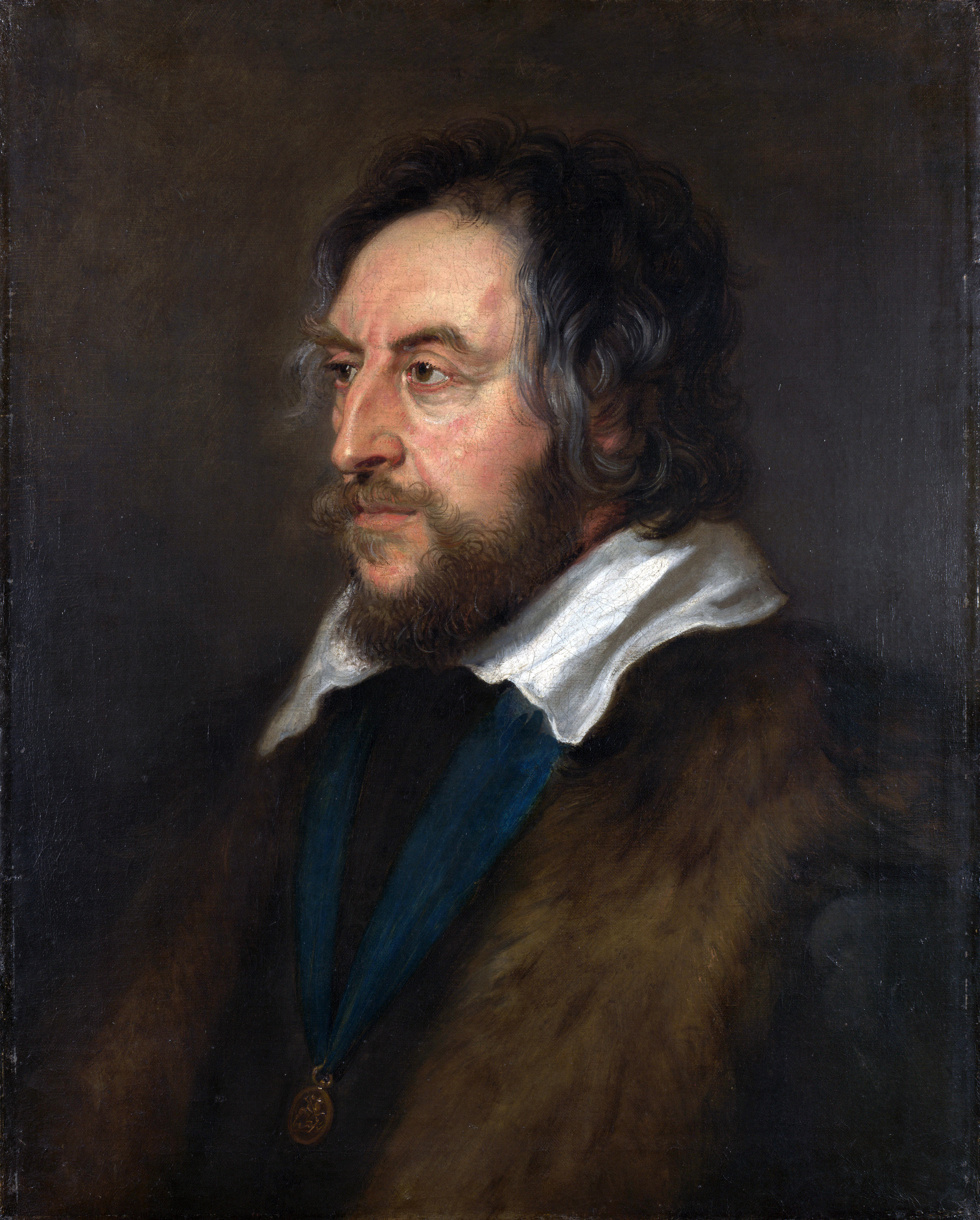
The Earl Marshal, Thomas Howard, 21st Earl of Arundel insisted Corbet exhume his servant to please the Needhams.

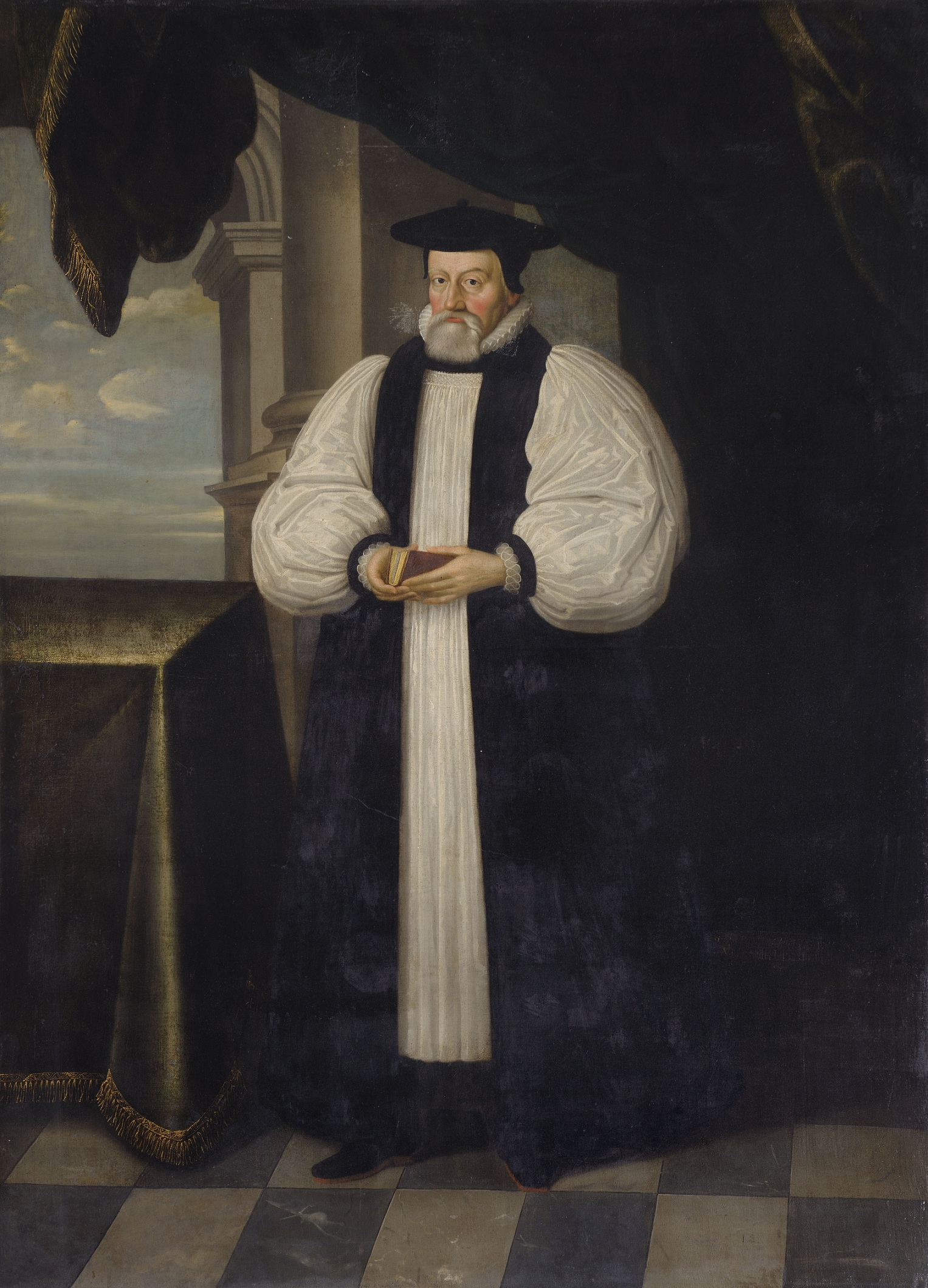
Thomas Morton, Bishop of Lichfield and Coventry 1618–32, sought to defuse the dispute between the Corbets and Needhams.

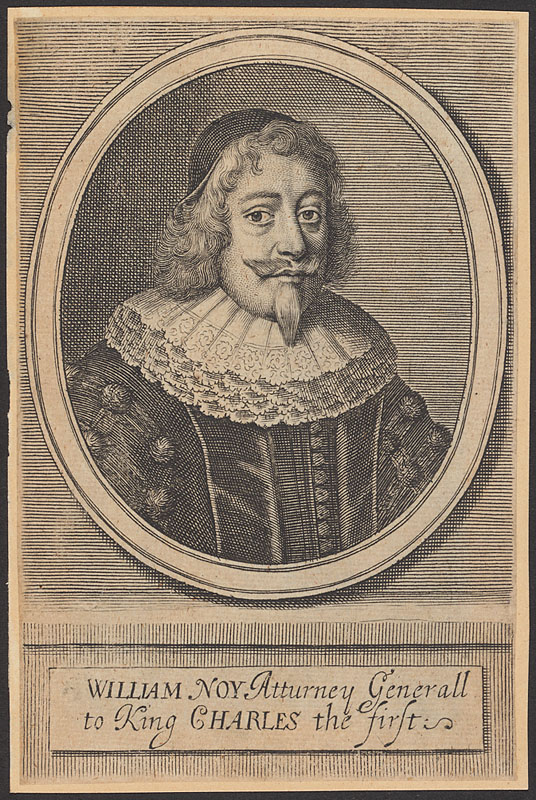
William Noy, the Attorney General, advised that Corbet's position on the Kilmorey transept was essentially correct. However, his advice to the government also led to the imposition of Ship money.

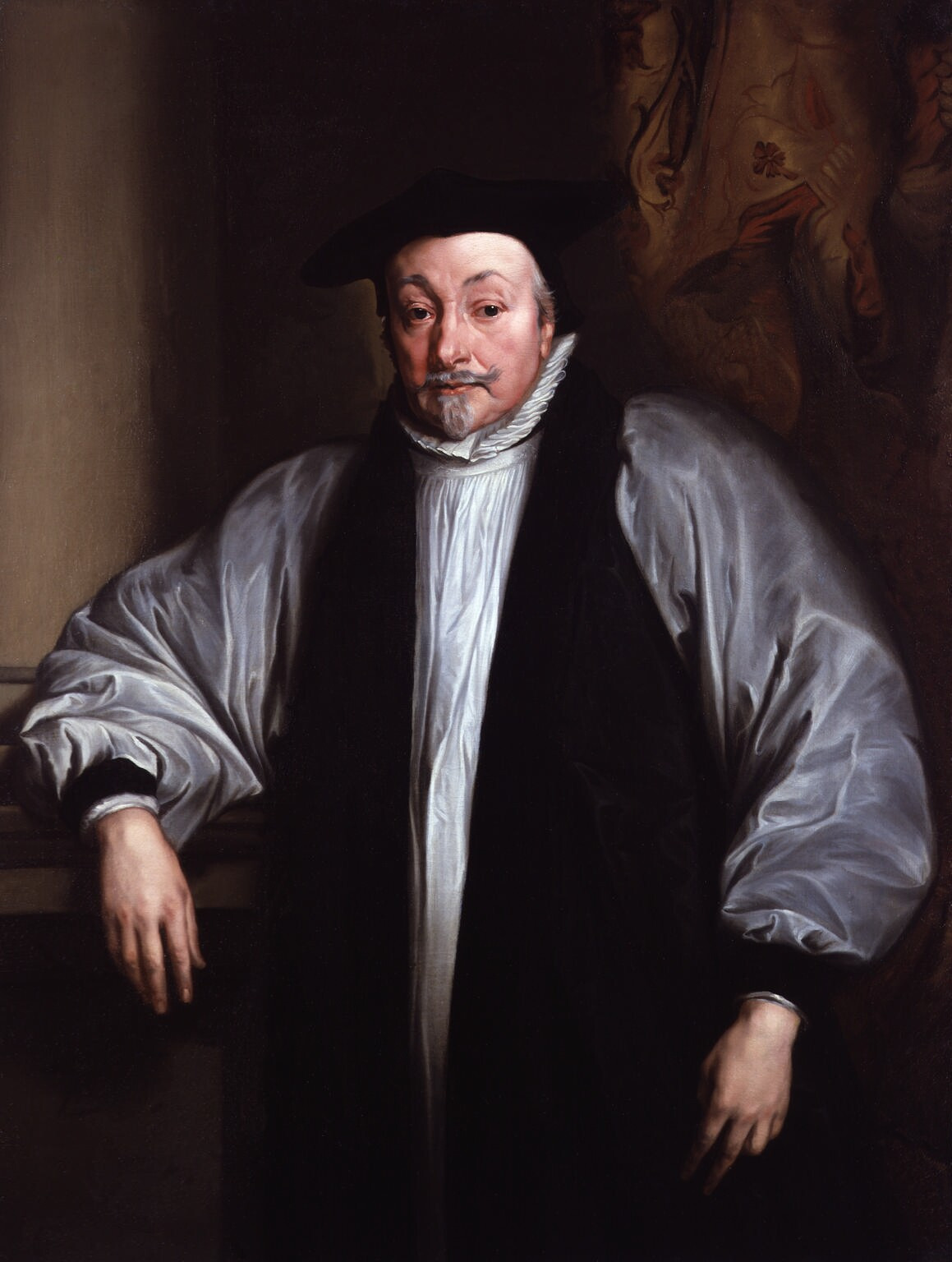
William Laud, main enemy of the Puritans, licensed the building of Kilmorey's mortuary chapel at Adderley church.

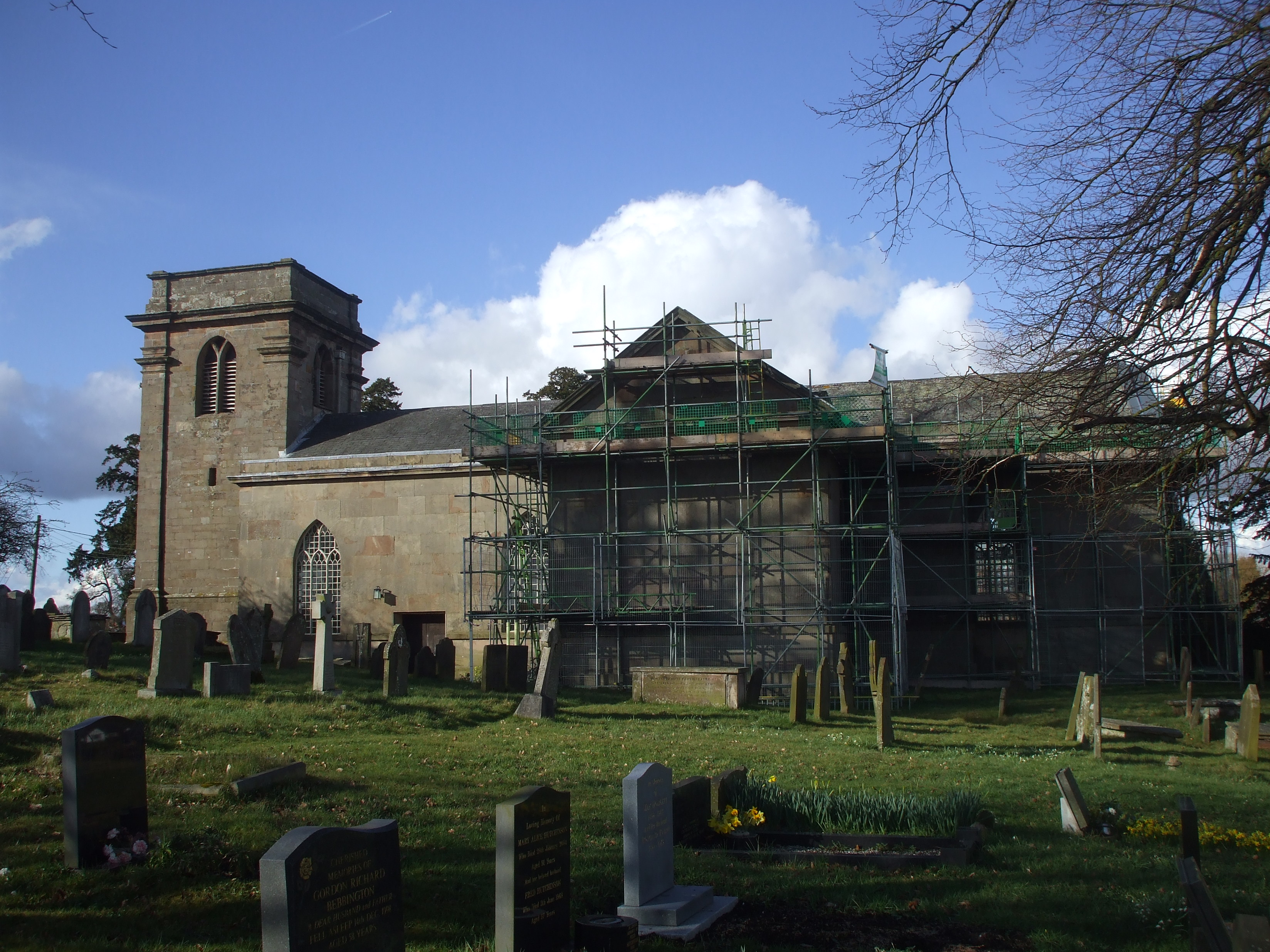
St. Peter's church at Adderley. The Kilmorey transept remains a prominent feature.

Corbet pursued a dispute over many years with his neighbours, the Needhams of Shavington Hall, involving control and use of St Peter's Church, Adderley. Although generally treated as "a quarrel over honour and precedence", in line with its treatment by the ardently royalist family biographer Augusta Corbet, there were underlying issues concerning the direction of developments in the Church of England. In the absence of parliamentary politics, the royalist, High Church Needhams contested the parish church with the parliamentarian and Puritan Corbets.

There was a history of ill-will between Corbet and Robert Needham, his neighbour. Needham's estates were centred on Cranage in Cheshire, although he had a holdings also in Shropshire, which he represented in parliament twice and where he was politically active. His seat was at Shavington Hall, which is between Adderley and Ightfield, just inside Shropshire and in the parish of Adderley, where Corbet was lord of the manor and held advowson of the church. Needham had served in Ireland during the Nine Years' War and married four times - on the last two occasions to very wealthy widows who brought him a huge fortune. On the accession of Charles I in 1625, he was elevated to the Peerage of Ireland as the 1st Viscount Kilmorey. Issues between Needham and Corbet initially centred on rights of way and small pockets of land. However, Needham was discontented with his status in the parish church, where Corbet, as patron, had a pew in the chancel, facing the rector, while he, as a parishioner, was expected to sit in the nave. The rector gave up his pew to accommodate the Needhams, as he was unmarried. When he later married, his wife accepted the arrangement.

Needham was still unhappy that he was not accommodated in the chancel as of right and petitioned Thomas Morton, the Bishop of Lichfield for permission to restore his private chapel. Private chapels had been in disfavour during the reign of Elizabeth who personally enforced attendance by the gentry and nobility at their parish church during her visits: the Needhams' insistence on a private chapel raised suspicions of crypto-Catholicism. Morton, a staunch Protestant and puritan sympathiser, took legal advice and suggested that a notice of intention to rebuild the chapel be read out in the parish church to allow for objections. However, none was lodged, the rebuilding was carried out and the chapel consecrated by the Bishop of Lichfield in 1629. Eight months later, Corbet began a suit in the Court of Arches to have the consecration of the chapel declared invalid. This was only partially successful. The consecration was declared invalid "in its plenary sense" but the chapel was declared consecrated for preaching, prayer and celebrations of the Lord's Supper - essentially all normal Anglican worship. Although this appeared a defeat for Corbet, Robert Needham, 2nd Viscount Kilmorey decided to press for a complete restoration of the consecration when he succeeded to the title in 1631. A special commission met at Market Drayton and overturned the decision of the Arches Court. Corbet responded by having his deceased Irish footman buried four feet above the late Lord Kilmorey in the chancel of Adderley church. Kilmorey sought the intervention of Thomas Howard, 21st Earl of Arundel, the Earl Marshal, who, as a senior Officer of arms, treated the matter as a precedence dispute and ordered Corbet to exhume his servant's body.

Despite this total victory, Kilmorey decided to press further, demanding that he be allowed to build a family mortuary chapel in an aisle or transept at Adderley. William Noy, the Attorney General for England and Wales, advised him:

No man of the Parish of what condition so ever may buyld an Isle or demolysh part of ye Church for ye purpose without consent of the Byshop and the Patron and the incumbent, and also of the parishioners.

As these conditions were unlikely ever to be met, Kilmorey bided his time until 1635, when Corbet was imprisoned in the Fleet, and then petitioned the king directly, asking for permission to build the chapel "if the Lord's Grace of Canterbury your worthy metropolitain (upon reference to him) shall think fit." Archbishop William Laud, then at the height of his campaign to impose a High Church uniformity, was happy to give Kilmorey his licence. The transept was built by 1637. However, on 6 March 1642, while Corbet was in attendance at parliament, his wife and children occupied the Kilmorey chapel. On 30 March, four of Corbet's armed servants prevented Kilmorey's reoccupation of his family pews. On 8 May Ann Corbet sent 20 armed men to secure the church before taking her family into Kilmorey's chapel, and in the afternoon repeated the show with an even larger force. Kilmorey petitioned Laud for restitution but he was too late. Corbet had the protection of parliamentary privilege and Laud had already been impeached and was in prison under threat of execution. The issue was submerged into the English Civil War, in which Corbet and Kilmorey took opposing sides.

== Parliamentarian ==
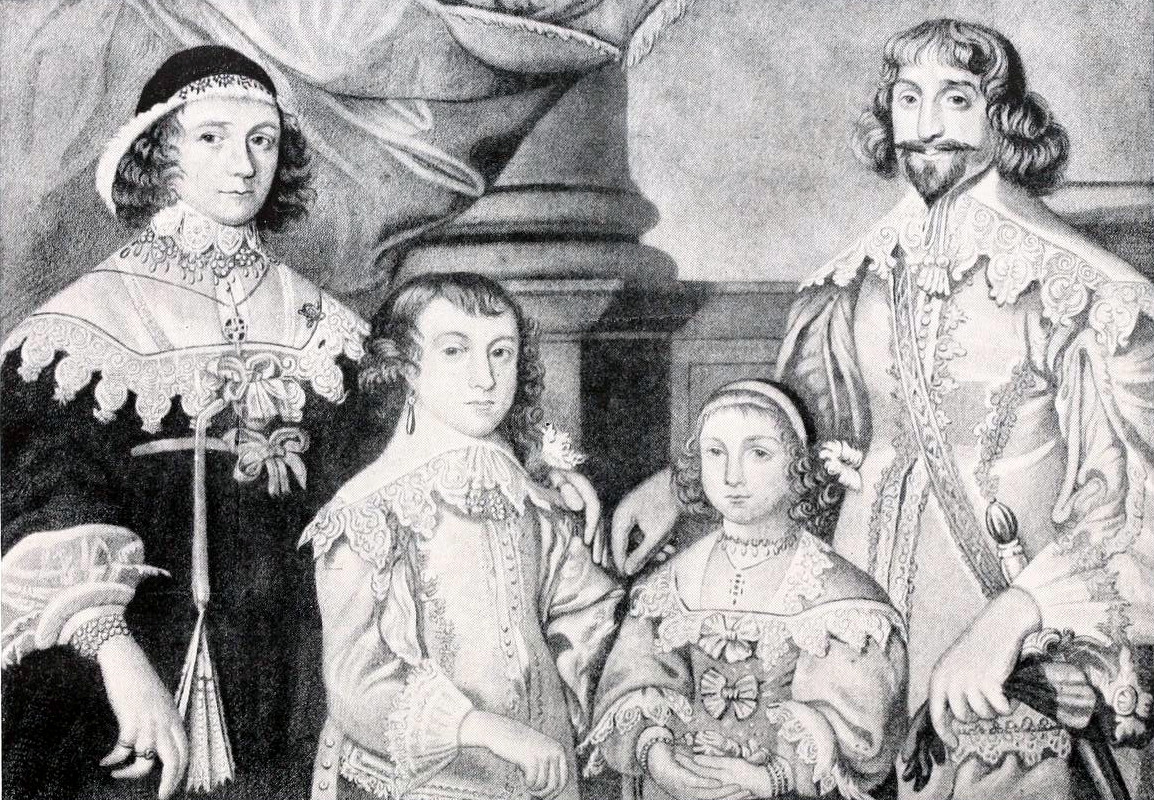
Sir Francis Ottley with his wife, Lucy, and children, Richard and Mary. Sir Francis was the royalist military governor of Shrewsbury at the beginning of the English Civil War. Richard, as deputy lieutenant, was one of those who purged Shrewsbury town council of religious dissenters.

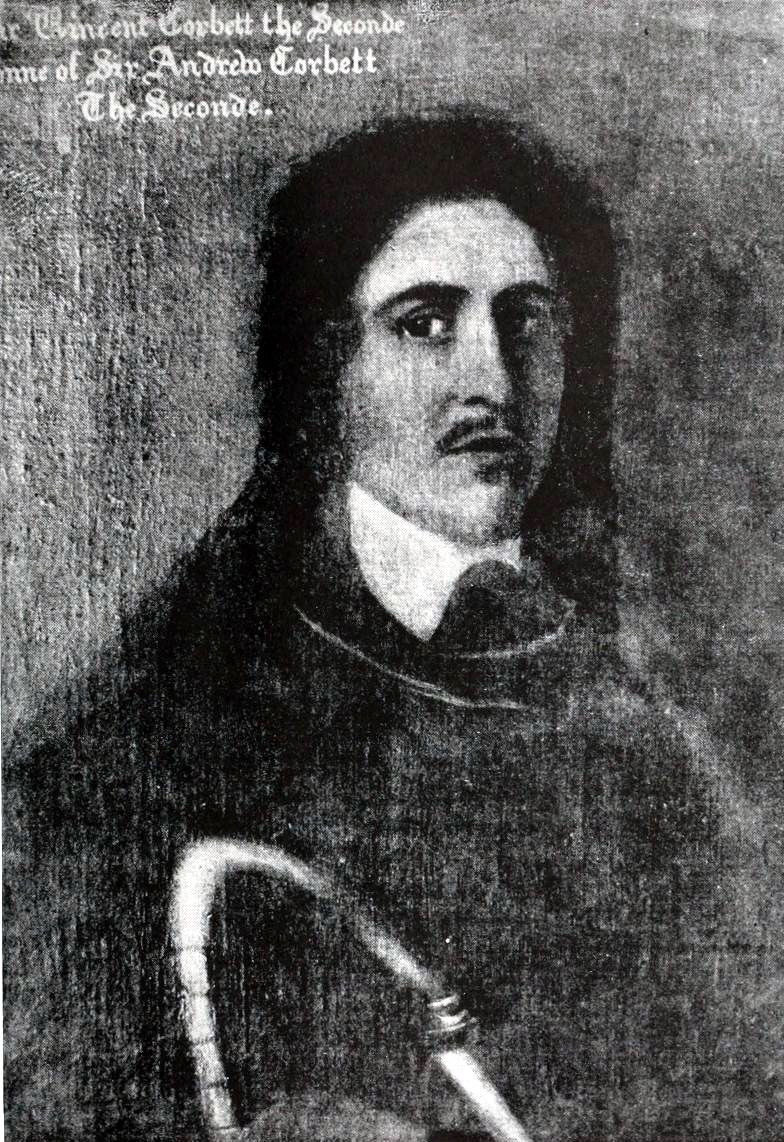
Sir Vincent Corbet, 1st Baronet of Moreton Corbet, Shropshire. A royalist cavalry commander in the Midlands during the English Civil War. Son of Sir Andrew Corbet and a relative of the parliamentarian, Sir John.

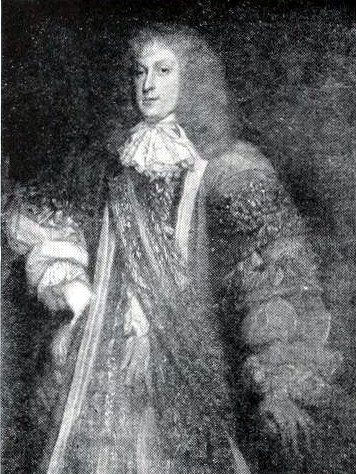
Sir John Corbet, 2nd Baronet of Stoke upon Tern and Adderley, Sir John's son and heir. He fought for the royalists in the English Civil War and was present at the siege of Bridgnorth.

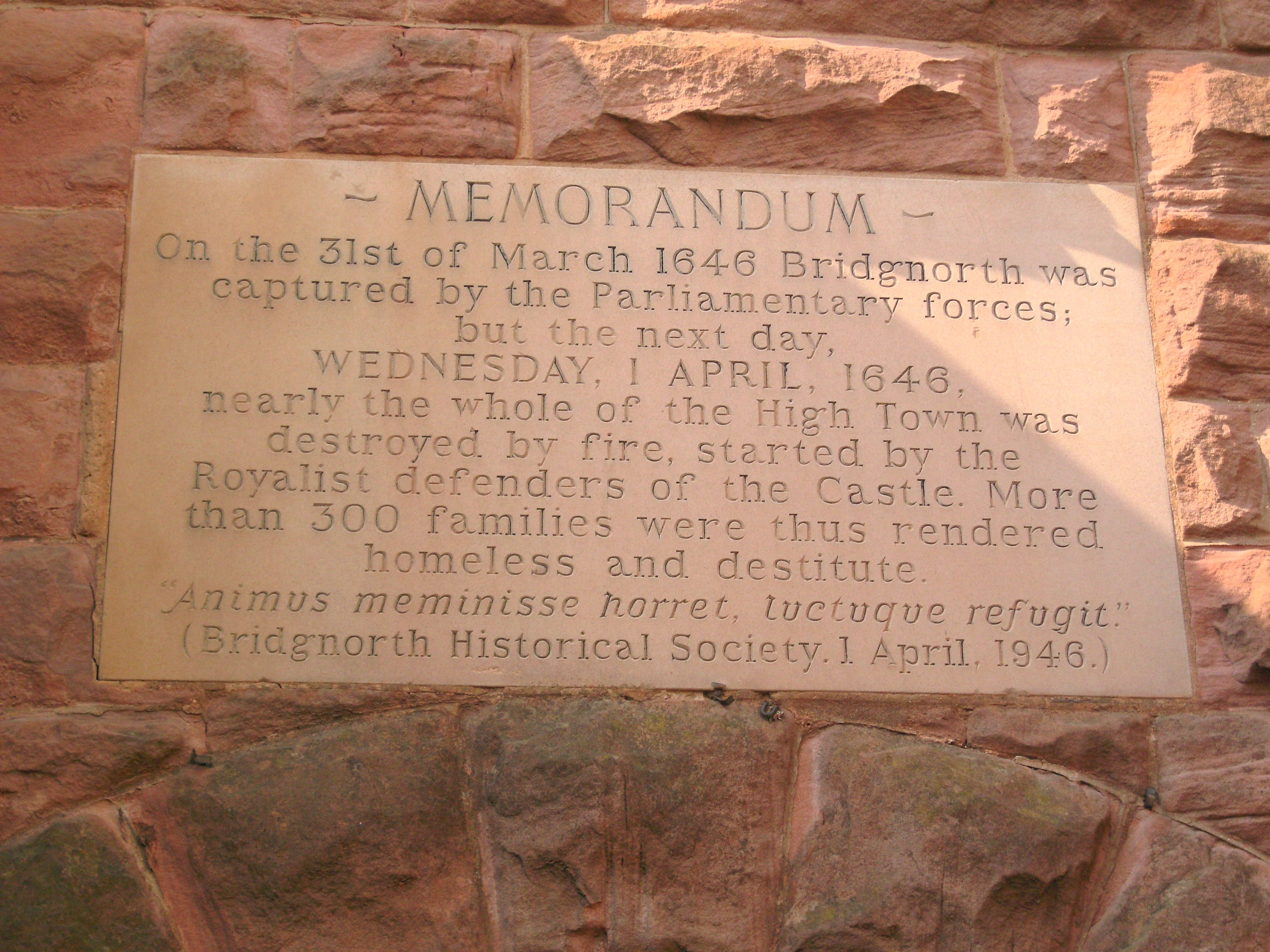
Inscription on Bridgnorth Museum, commemorating the deliberate destruction of the town by royalist forces, commanded by Sir Thomas Wolryche of Dudmaston Hall

Corbet was returned as knight of the shire for Shropshire in the Long Parliament, along with Sir Richard Lee, his nephew. After the attempted arrest of the Five Members on 4 January 1642, Parliament raised the issue of control of the militia by proposing to take the appointment of the Lords Lieutenant of the counties from the king. Corbet presented a petition from Shropshire on the subject to the House of Lords later in the month. He was one of the MPs deputed to negotiate with the king on the issue, in an attempt to stave off hostilities. In March, however, both Houses passed the Militia Ordinance, placing the militia under parliamentary control, and declared the act valid without royal consent. The king responded by establishing Commissions of array, effectively dividing the country into opposed armed camps. In the summer, faced with the likelihood of a royalist mobilisation in the shires, the Commons outlawed the commissions of array and set out commissions to enforce the Militia Ordinance. Corbet and two other members were sent to Shropshire with the remit:

“That Mr. Pierpoint, Sir John Corbet, and Mr. More, do forthwith repair into the County of Salop, and possess that County, with the Declaration of both Houses, concerning the Illegality of the Commission of Array: And that they, together with such others of the said County as they shall think fit to use and employ therein, do propound the Propositions concerning Contribution of Horse, Arms Money, or Plate, for the Defence of the Kingdom, in the several Parts of that County. And it is further Ordained, That the said Mr. Pierpoint, Sir John Corbett, and Mr. More, shall and may require the Sheriff, and all other Officers in the Trained Bands, and all other Persons whatsoever, in the said County, to preserve the Peace, and to be therein aiding and assisting to the said Mr. Pierepoint, Sir John Corbett, and Mr. More.”

== Royalist seizure of Shropshire ==
The mission of Corbet, Pierrepont and More met with an initially positive response. The Drapers' Company at Shrewsbury responded with a substantial contribution of silver plate, money and equipment. However, this was followed by a series of reverses. A parliamentary muster on 1 August was dispersed by a group of royalist gentry, under Francis Ottley. The royalist array drilled at Atcham the following day, under Sir Vincent Corbet, 1st Baronet, who had succeeded Sir Andrew at Moreton Corbet and taken the royalist side. Sir Richard Lee, Corbet's colleague as MP for Shropshire, was expelled from Parliament for executing an illegal commission of array, and was replaced by Humphrey Edwards. Sir Richard Newport appeared on the scene as a mediator but had secretly pledged £6000 to the king for a barony. However, he created enough confusion and was duly rewarded.

The king set up his standard at Nottingham on 23 August. A declaration of non-resistance by Shrewsbury council on 30 August gave the initiative in the county to the royalists. Encouraged by Ottley, the king led his army south westwards across the Midlands and occupied Shrewsbury on 20 September. The royalist field army remained at Shrewsbury until 12 October, confronted by the parliamentary army, under the Lord General Robert Devereux, 3rd Earl of Essex, based at Worcester. The king was initially welcomed, although the population had little choice in the face of overwhelming force. However, the behaviour of the royalists began to damage their own cause. The troops were ill-paid or unpaid and took to looting, both in the towns and the north Shropshire countryside, even though the king opened a mint at Shrewsbury to turn silver plate into coin. The king issued proscription lists, covering the local parliamentary and Puritan leadership, and this continued under Ottley, who commanded the garrison after the field army departed. Corbet and his associates were effectively excluded from their native county.

== The Shropshire County Committee ==
In the Spring of 1643 Parliament began to prepare for the recovery of the West Midlands as part of a general acceptance that the war would be long and hard. In February Corbet was appointed as colonel of forces to be raised in Shropshire. Later in the month he was one of the MPs deputed to work with Essex in ceasefire negotiations, which dragged on until April but proved abortive. He was also named twice for Shropshire and once for Westminster in acts designed to expedite the raising of revenue through forced loans and levies. The February ordinance set a target of £375 as Shropshire's weekly contribution to the parliamentary war effort – a huge sum, and one unlikely to appear in the foreseeable future, as the county was still almost entirely occupied by the royalists. In March Corbet was appointed one of the commissioners for Shropshire charged with "sequestring notorious Delinquents Estates."

By now the list of names of those charged with executing legislation in Shropshire had become almost uniform, with the original core group of Corbet, Pierrepont and More supplemented by Thomas Hunt, the M.P. for Shrewsbury; the soldier Thomas Mytton of Halston; the lawyer Humphrey Mackworth; Andrew Lloyd of Aston near Oswestry; and the lawyer Robert Corbet of Stanwardine, Sir John's second cousin. In April, this Shropshire County Committee was federated with its counterparts in Warwickshire and Staffordshire. Progress was initially slow, as the commander of the parliamentary army in the region, Basil Feilding, 2nd Earl of Denbigh became emmired in accusations of disloyalty. However, the Shropshire Committee enlisted the help of Sir William Brereton of Cheshire and in September seized a foothold in the county at Wem. From there they established a smaller garrison at Stoke upon Tern, Corbet's home and later stormed Moreton Corbet Castle. Sir John Corbet himself was not much in evidence in the county during the fighting, apparently spending much of his time in London. The same was true, however, even of Mytton, the military governor at Wem, who absented himself to London when the town was under threat.

== The crisis of the Presbyterians ==
Corbet was part of "the middle group" in the Commons, who were working for a Presbyterian church order and peace. Events ran away from this group as the war, both nationally and regionally, progressed. In February 1645 Shrewsbury was taken by the Wem garrison, aided by parliamentarian sympathisers inside the town, and placed under the control of Mackworth. The war nationally swung decisively in Parliament's favour, with the victory of Naseby in June. The royalist strongholds in Shropshire fell one after another under the control of the county committee. Corbet's son, also called John, had taken the royalist side and by this time was fighting alongside Sir Vincent Corbet. He was present at the siege of Bridgnorth in March 1646, when the royalist garrison burnt down the town as it fell to parliamentary forces.

The Presbyterians seemed to achieve their goal in January 1647, when organisational and liturgical changes, devised by the Westminster Assembly for both England and Scotland, were brought into force, the Directory of Public Worship replacing the Book of Common Prayer. However, Shropshire was one of just eight counties that tried to implement the new order. Corbet was named at the head of the elders for the fourth of the eight classes, into which the county was divided. This classis, which included Wem and Whitchurch, as well as Sir John's seats at Adderley and Stoke, was probably the only one of the eight to become fully operational. It was generally known as the Whitchurch classis, after its largest town, or the North Bradford classis, after the hundred in which it was situated. Corbet had by now been relieved of Wolley, his royalist Rector at Adderley. Auden claims of Wolley (whom he calls Edmund, although he is Edward elsewhere) that "his sequestration must have been early, for he was with the King at Oxford when he was created D.D., on 30 Dec. 1643." However, the tiny Parliamentary garrison at Wem was very hard pressed in December 1643: the whole area was being pillaged by royalist soldiers, reinforced from Ireland. It is more likely that Wolley was prudent enough to flee a war zone, although the Episcopalian incumbents at Wem and Prees were ejected by the Parliamentary troops. These and other supporters of the royalist regime were replaced by Presbyterian clergy: a total of 63 ministers over the 12 years of the classis. In 1648, 26 classis ministers and 31 others from Shropshire signed a declaration against the toleration of Independents. They included Corbet's new pastor at Adderley, Peter Niccols.

However, events were now moving quickly against the Presbyterians nationally, as they were tarnished by association when the king tried to have himself restored to power by a Scottish army. The army and the Independents had become impatient and Pride's Purge in December 1648 barred the Presbyterian majority from Parliament, clearing the way for the trial and execution of Charles I. Corbet was one of those secluded from parliament, although Humphrey Edwards, the other Shropshire MP, went on to become a regicide.

== Later years and death ==
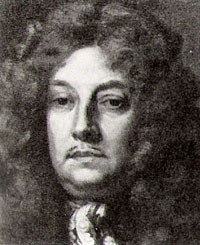
Francis Lord Newport, the Lord Lieutenant, was responsible for purging Calvinists from public office after the Restoration. He later suffered a similar fate himself for his opposition to the succession of James II.

Corbet's further role in public affairs was small. When parliamentary troops bound for Ireland were billeted in north Shropshire in August 1649, rioting broke out. In response, a committee was made responsible for maintaining parliamentary forces in the county and Corbet appointed to it. He also served as a burgess on Shrewsbury's council. It is likely that he continued to play an influential role in his own Presbyterian classis, which long survived the wreck of Presbyterian dreams of establishing a national church. It continued to ordain ministers until the last years of the Commonwealth of England. One of the most notable was Philip Henry, ordained in 1657. However, Corbet was no longer active as a magistrate: he is not recorded on the bench at the quarter sessions, except for one last stand by the Parliamentarians in May 1660, when he chaired the bench, sitting with Robert Corbet of Stanwardine, Humphrey Mackworth the Younger and other Shropshire committee members.

At the Restoration of Charles II, Francis Lord Newport was appointed Lord Lieutenant of Shropshire and made responsible for purging parliamentarians and religious dissenters from public office. Newport regarded Bradford Hundred as his own domain: he was later to take the title of his earldom from it. He was affronted by the continued operation of the 4th classis and took steps to eject Presbyterian ministers at every possible opportunity. First to go was Thomas Porter, the incumbent at Whitchurch and the leading minister within the classis: he was replaced by Nicholas Bernard, a moderate figure favoured by the patron, John Egerton, 2nd Earl of Bridgewater. Another leading minister, Andrew Parsons of Wem, was arrested as potentially subversive in 1661. Early in 1662, Sir John Corbet and a number of others who refused to take an oath against the Solemn League and Covenant, which had been made null and void by the Sedition Act 1661, were removed from Shrewsbury council. This was followed by a thorough purge of Presbyterian clergy, which Newport initiated months before the Act of Uniformity 1662 that authorised it came into effect.

Corbet died in June 1662 at the age of 68 and was buried in the chancel of the parish church at Market Drayton, Shropshire.

== Marriage and family ==
Corbet married Anne Mainwaring daughter of Sir George Mainwaring of Ightfield in or before 1620. Sir George had been MP for Shropshire in 1572 and, like the Needhams, was a major landowner in Cheshire with holdings and a seat in north Shropshire. Anne Mainwaring was his only daughter. She outlived her husband, Sir John Corbet, by more than twenty years and their son, the younger Sir John, by eighteen. Her strong personality and determined support for the parliamentary and Puritan causes earned her the sobriquet "the Good Lady Corbet."

Sir John and Lady Anne had ten sons and ten daughters of which 17 children reached adulthood. They included:

- Sir John Corbet (1619-64), second of the Corbet baronets of Stoke. He married Lettice Knollys or Laetitia Knowles, daughter of Sir Robert Knollys of Greys Court, Oxfordshire. He survived his father by only two years and passed the title to his son and heir, also called Sir John Corbet (1642-95).
- Vincent Corbet (1621-54) married Elizabeth Church. He served as a cavalry captain in the 5th West India Regiment under the parliamentarian commanders Robert Venables and Anthony Buller and died without issue.
- Anne Corbet (b.1621) married Nathaniel Desborough of Shropshire.
- Richard Corbet (b.1622)
- George Corbet (b.1623)
- Margaret Corbet (b.1625) married Sir William Stafford of Blatherwick, Northamptonshire, who took part in Henry Rich, 1st Earl of Holland's royalist revolt during the Second English Civil War and was MP for Stamford in the Cavalier Parliament from 1661 until his death in 1665.
- Anne Corbet (b.1626), also known as Jane, married Robert Anstruther, of Wheatley, Yorks
- Frances Corbet (b.1627) married in David Maurice or Dafydd Morris of Pen-y-bont Fawr, near Pennant Melangell, Montgomeryshire.
- Alice Corbet (b.1628) married Thomas Cotton of Pulley, Meole Brace, near Shrewsbury.
- Meriel Corbet (b.1629) married Sir Henry Hene, 2nd of the Hene baronets of Winkfield, Berkshire, whose seat was at Foliejon Park.
- Dorothy Corbet (b.1629), Meriel's twin, married John Shelbury.
- Magdalen Corbet (1630-1698) married Sir Humphrey Brigges, 2nd of the Brigges Baronets of Haughton Hall, near Shifnal, Shropshire and was his fourth wife. They were without issue.
- Susanna Corbet (b.1631) married George Spurstow of Spurstow, near Chester.
- Reginald or Reynold Corbet (b.1632)
- Humphrey Corbet (b.1632 or 1633), possibly twin of Reginald, died in infancy.
- Grace Corbet married Sir William Pulteney of Westminster, a wealthy London businessman. He was a royalist in the Civil War and went on to represent Westminster in five parliaments after the Restoration. He was a determined opponent of the succession of James II
- Rowland Corbet (1635-37)
- Henry Corbet (b.1637) married Catherine Cholmondeley, sister of Robert Cholmondeley, 1st Viscount Cholmondeley.
- Robert Corbet (b.1639 or 1640)

== Footnotes ==
Parliament of England
Preceded by Sir Richard Lee, 2nd Baronet; Sir Richard Newport	Member of Parliament for Shropshire; 1640–1648; With: Humphrey Edwards	Succeeded by Humphrey Edwards
Baronetage of England
New creation	Baronet (of Stoke upon Tern); 1627–1662	Succeeded by John Corbet
