= Brigges =

Brigges is a surname. Notable people with the surname include:

- Brigges Baronets
- Humphrey Brigges (disambiguation), multiple people

== See also ==
- Briggs (surname)
