= Briggs Enigma =

Pillar found on Nevis, now in the British Museum

- Material: Sandstone
- Place: Nevis
- Present location: British Museum, London
- Identification: Am1889C2.4419
- Registration: Am,+.4419

The Briggs Enigma is a pillar carved with four figures that was donated to the British Museum by Sir Augustus Wollaston Franks in 1879.

The statue was found on one of Sir Thomas Graham Briggs' estates on the island of Nevis, in the Caribbean. It is made of grey sandstone, which is not found on Nevis. It is rectangular in cross-section and is about a metre high. Furthermore, it shows four women standing together with their backs to each other. Between each pair of their thighs is a small head. The women have long curly hair, which is neither African nor American Indian.

The pillar was part of a large collection offered for sale in late 1889, after Briggs' death; it was acquired by Franks and donated to the museum. The statue is currently held by the British Museum.
