= Humphrey Briggs (disambiguation) =

Sir Humphrey Briggs, 4th Baronet (1670–1734) was an English Whig politician.

Humphrey Briggs may also refer to:

- Sir Humphrey Briggs, 2nd Baronet (1615–1691) of the Briggs baronets
- Sir Humphrey Briggs, 3rd Baronet (1650–1700) of the Briggs baronets

== See also ==
- Brigges (surname)
