= Sir Vincent Corbet, 1st Baronet =

English lawyer and politician

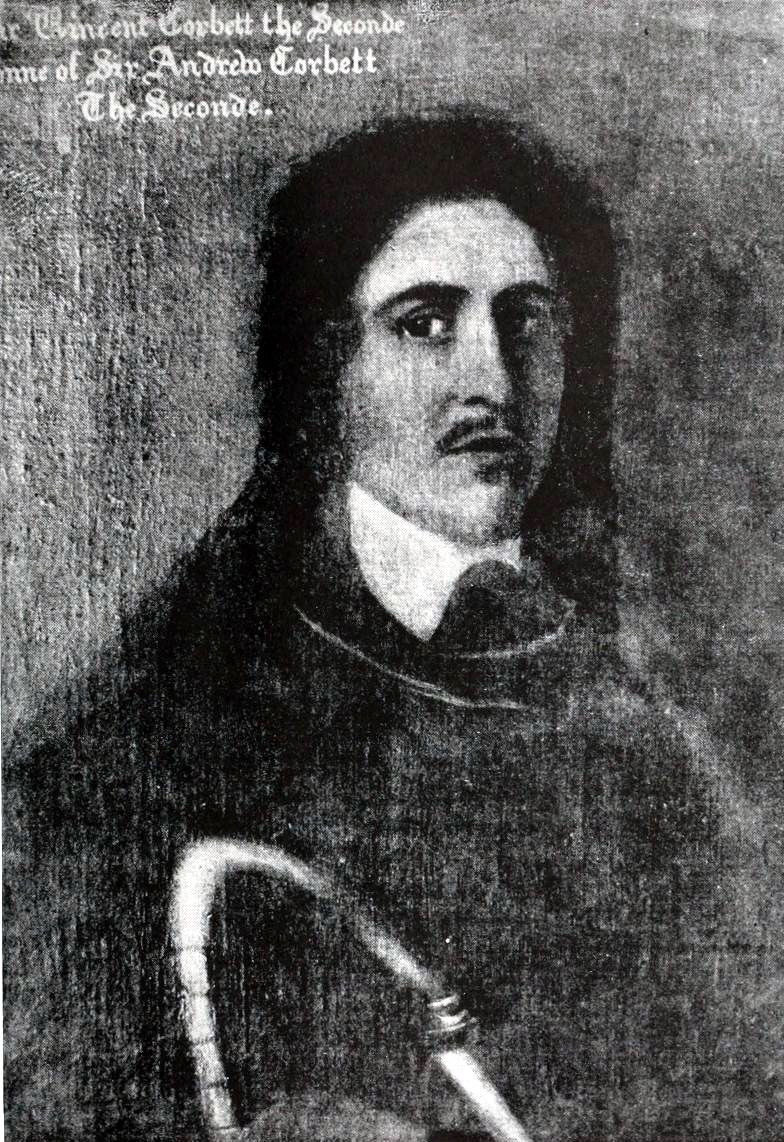
Sir Vincent Corbet, 1st Baronet of Moreton Corbet, Shropshire. A royalist cavalry commander in the Midlands during the English Civil War.

Sir Vincent Corbet, 1st Baronet (13 June 1617 – 28 December 1656) was an English lawyer and politician who sat for Shropshire in the House of Commons in the Short Parliament of 1640. He fought on the Royalist side in the English Civil War.

== Background ==
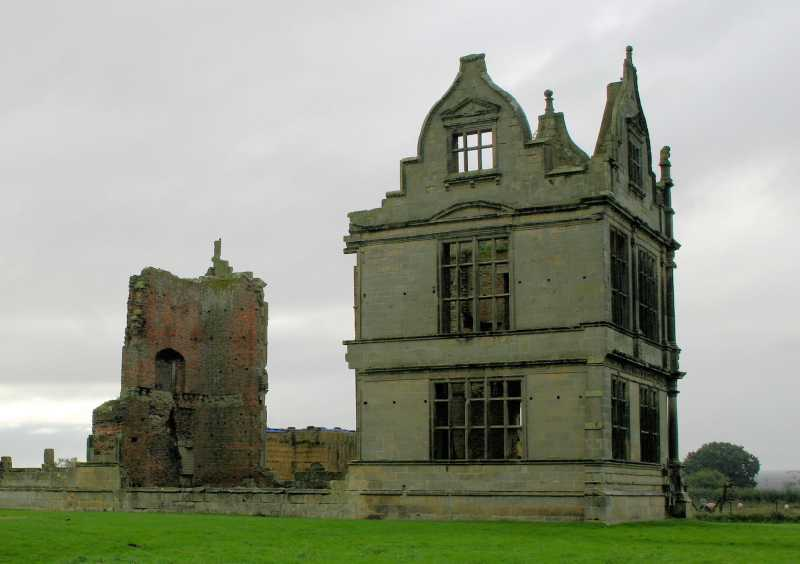
Remains of part of Moreton Corbet Castle

Corbet was the son of

- Sir Andrew Corbet, of Moreton Corbet, Shropshire. Sir Andrew was a grandson of another Sir Andrew Corbet, a distinguished soldier, politician and administrator of the Elizabethan period, whose career had marked the zenith of the power and influence of the Shropshire Corbet family. However the family had suffered dynastic and financial woes since the death of the first Sir Andrew in 1578. His two older sons, Robert and Richard had both died without leaving a male heir, and the latter had run up over £6,000 worth of debts and liabilities. Their youngest brother, Sir Vincent, had struggled with some success, to stabilise, if not rectify, the financial situation. Part of the recovery plan was the marriage between his son, Andrew, and Elizabeth Boothby.
- Elizabeth Boothby was the step-daughter of Richard Corbet, the daughter of his second wife, Judith Austin. Judith was an assertive widow, who had gathered wealth through three marriages, and well-able to exploit deficiencies in her jointure arrangement, to the detriment of the Corbets' delicate finances. By marrying Andrew to her young daughter, Sir Vincent gave Judith an interest in the Corbet estates.

Sir Andrew and Lady Elizabeth had at least seven sons and nine daughters, naming the first son and heir Vincent, after Sir Andrew's father. Sir Andrew went on to become a notable MP for Shropshire. After supporting George Villiers, 1st Duke of Buckingham in the reign of James VI and I, he became a strong opponent of absolute monarchy under Charles and voted for the Petition of Right. His son and heir was to take a very different political stance.

=== Family tree ===
The family tree below shows Sir Vincent Corbet's ancestry and relationship to some other Shropshire Corbets involved in the Civil War.

Sir Vincent Corbet: his ancestry and relatives

Sir Robert Corbet (d.1513) of Moreton Corbet	Elizabeth Vernon (d.1563)
Anne Windsor	Roger Corbet of Moreton Corbet and Linslade	Richard Corbet of Poynton	Margaret Savile	Reginald Corbet of Stoke	Alice Gratewood
Jane Needham	Sir Andrew Corbet of Moreton Corbet	Robert Corbet of Stanwardine	Jane Kynaston	Jerome Corbet of Beslow	Dorothy Poyner	Richard Corbet	Anne Bromley
Robert Corbet (died 1583)	Richard Corbet (died 1606)	Judith Austin	William Boothby	Sir Vincent Corbet	Frances Humfreston	Sir John Corbet, 1st Bart., Puritan and Parliamentarian
Elizabeth Boothby	Sir Andrew Corbet, Parliamentarian	Margaret Corbet	Thomas Corbet of Stanwardine	Sir John Corbet, 2nd Baronet, Cavalier
Sarah Monson	SIR VINCENT CORBET, 1st Baronet	Elizabeth Ludlow	Robert Corbet of Stanwardine, lawyer and Parliamentarian

== Early life and education ==
Vincent Corbet was baptized at Moreton Corbet on 13 July 1617, the parish register unusually noting the date of his birth: 13 June. He matriculated at Queen's College, Oxford on 24 October 1634. After the death of his father, he was admitted to Lincoln's Inn on 11 November 1637.

== Political and military career ==
=== The outbreak of war ===
In April 1640, Corbet was elected Member of Parliament for Shropshire in the Short Parliament. He gained military experience in the King's war against the Scottish Presbyterians. For his support, the King created him baronet of Moreton Corbet on 29 January 1642.

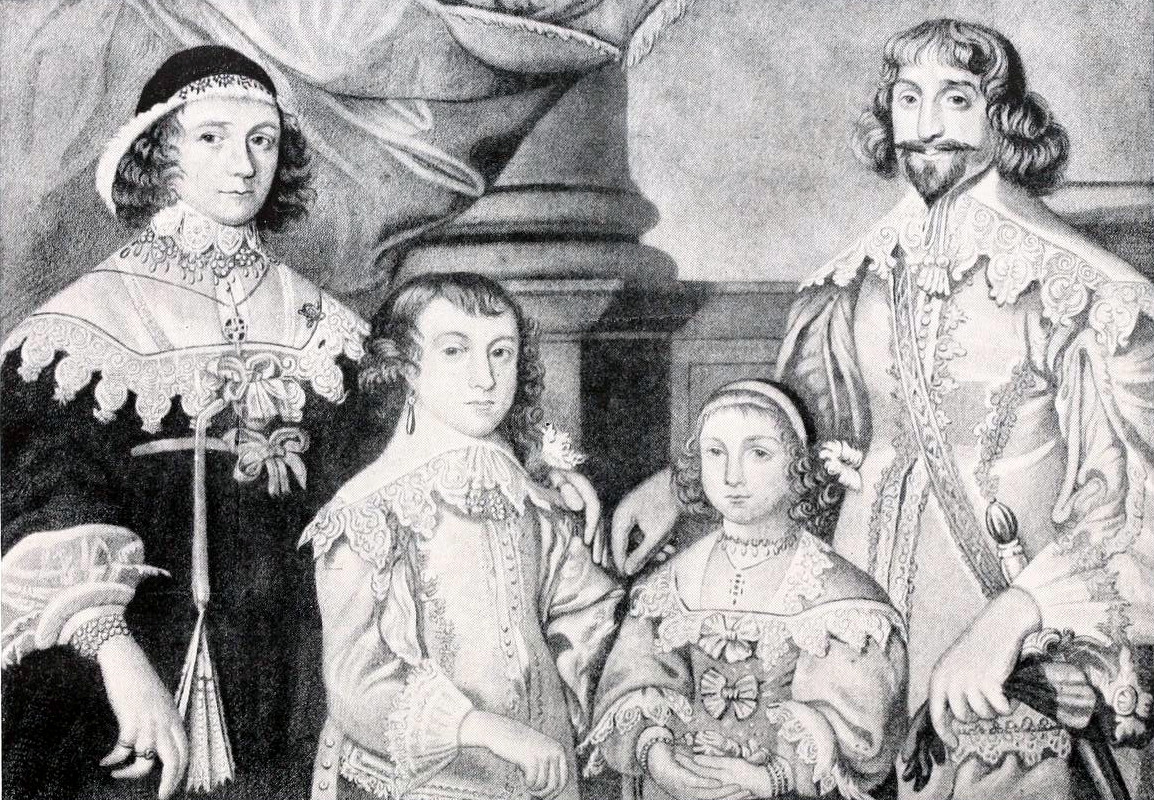
Sir Francis Ottley with his wife, Lucy Edwards, and two of their children, Richard and Mary. An engraving made c.1825 after an oil painting of 1636 by Petrus Troueil, now owned by the Shrewsbury Museums Service.

In the late summer of 1642, both Parliament and the King began mobilising their forces, the former under the Militia Ordinance, the latter under Commissions of array. Corbet was appointed a Commissioner of array for Shropshire and garrisoned his home at Moreton Corbet Castle in the King's cause. His second cousin, Sir John Corbet, was one of the three MP sent by parliament to take over the county militia. However the parliamentary muster was disrupted on 1 August by Francis Ottley, who quickly took up the leading position among Shropshire's Royalist gentry. Sir Vincent Corbet was left free to drill a royalist muster at Atcham, a few miles east of Shrewsbury, the following day.

The situation hung in the balance for another month. However, on 30 August, Shrewsbury's council agreed a policy of non-resistance to the King. Although this was far short of outright support, Ottley used it to encourage the King to march to Shrewsbury from his initial muster at Nottingham. The Royalist army occupied the town from 20 September until 12 October, overwhelming all resistance, and subjecting the town and surrounding areas to the looting and extortion of the ill-paid soldiery. Ottley, now knighted, was left in control of the town, although he was not formally made governor until January 1643.

=== Formation of the dragoons ===
In December Corbet and a number of Shropshire gentry resolved to establish a regiment of dragoons.

We whose names are hereunder written, do hereby engage ourselves, each to the other, and promise upon the faith and word of a Gentleman, that we will do our utmost endeavours, both by ourselves and friends, to raise as well for the defence of our King and country as our own particular safeties, one entire Regiment of dragooners, and with our lives to defend those men's fortunes and families, who shall be contributors herein to their abilities. And for the most speedy expedition of the said service, we have thought fit to entreat Sir Vincent Corbet, formerly Captain of the Horse for this County, to be our chief commander over the aforesaid Regiment.

The signatories were headed by Sir Richard Lee, 2nd Baronet, MP for Shropshire until expelled by Parliament, and included Ottley, the governor.

A muster was held at Battlefield, north of Shrewsbury, on 20 December. Great hopes were placed on the regiment, which was expected to recruit a thousand men. Only later did it become public that the recruiting drive had been largely unsuccessful, with only 60 responding initially. However, Corbet and his men were summoned to the fighting in Cheshire in January.

=== First blood ===
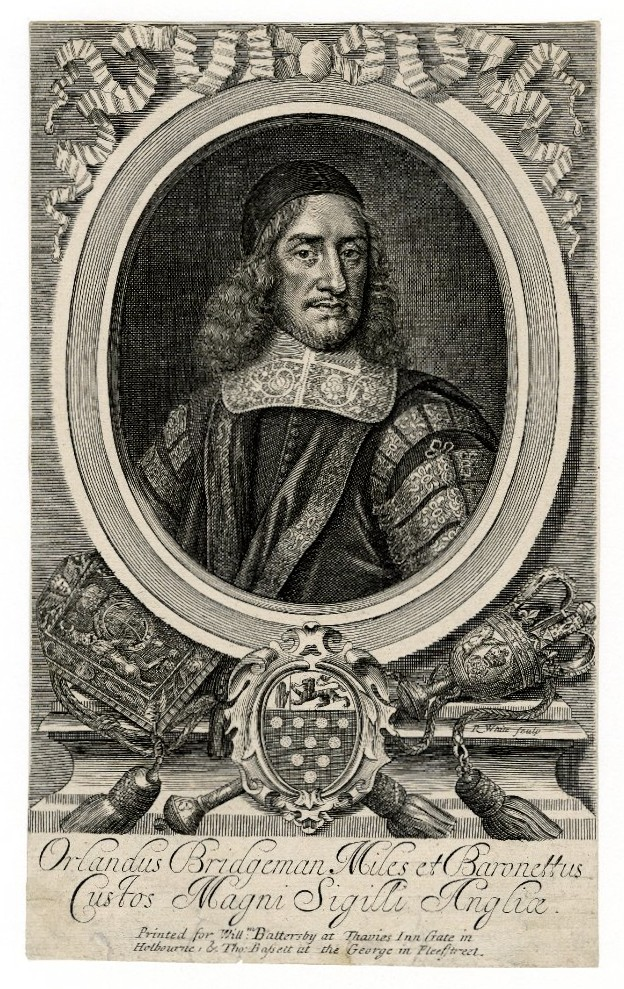
Orlando Bridgeman, portrayed in later life as a distinguished judge. Bridgeman criticised Corbet's initial refusal to advance into Cheshire.

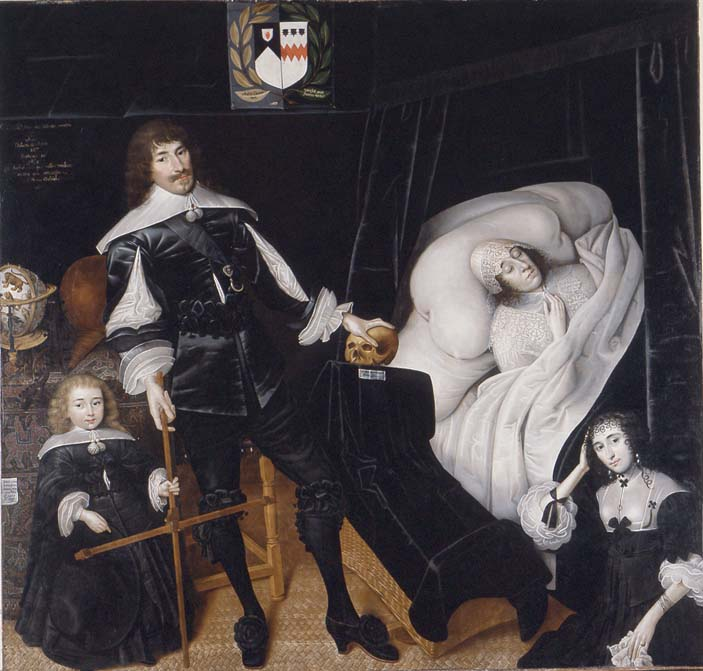
Sir Thomas Aston, 1st Baronet (1600–45), at the deathbed of his first wife, painted by John Souch (c. 1593–1646). Aston was Corbet's comrade in arms in 1643.

Major General Sir William Brereton, the chief commander of Parliamentarian forces in Cheshire and a major supporter of the Shropshire committee.

Chester was a vital Royalist stronghold, allowing the King to draw on supplies and reinforcements from Ireland, but the county was largely Parliamentarian in allegiance. The attempt to use Shropshire troops in Cheshire was dogged from the start by rivalries and poor communications. Orlando Bridgeman, the chief justice and effective deputy governor of Chester, rehearsed these problems in a letter to Sir Francis Ottley on 20 January: Corbet, he complained, had been instructed to advance from Whitchurch, Shropshire to Tarporley, well inside Cheshire, but had refused on the grounds that his force was too small. Bridgeman urged Ottley to appeal to the Shropshire gentry for reinforcements, as he believed an attack by Sir William Brereton, the main Parliamentarian commander in the region, imminent. However, John Harrington, a relative of Ottley, made clear the hopelessness of such a recruitment strategy in a letter of 25 January:

I find that our County and Especially these parts are very slow to keep themselves secure and to satisfie the com'on expectation, the Divells have got possession of the Swyne and they are running into their own Ruin, I see very well that the design of raising a Thousand Dragoons is in a manner quashed every Hundred is to find 10 and every Alottment according to their proportions, but suppose they delude you they will say much and do nothing (as it seems many have done in this expedition of Sir Vincent Corbett) what will you do then?

Corbet joined forces with Sir Thomas Aston, 1st Baronet, hoping that reinforcements would arrive. On 28 January Bridgeman wrote to Shrewsbury, preparing Ottley for bad news: Aston had moved toward Stafford and Brereton had slipped into Nantwich behind him. Later the same day, Aston wrote to explain what had happened: approaching what they thought was the friendly town of Nantwich, they had found it occupied by about 140 Parliamentarians. After a couple of attempts to storm the town, they withdrew to regroup, only to come face to face with Brereton's main force. They fought their way through: "both sides are loosers, what wee know not, night being theyre, friend our enemy." Aston requested musketeers to make good their losses. Corbet's account, written the following morning at Market Drayton, also sought to portray the encounter as a draw, but ominously asked not for soldiers but surgeons.

This in hast, is onely to give you notice, of a skirmish we had, w^{th} Breartons and y^{e} Nantwich forces, I cannot as yet certify of any p'ticular passage, onely thus far be satisfied for y^{e} present; the relation of it is not very good neither is it very bad, this much I would request you y^{t} w^{th} all Speede, you will send unto Whitchurch all y^{e} Churgieons you can possible p'vide for wee are in gr^{t} want of them.

Brereton's account of the skirmish avers that the force he sent to occupy Nantwich was a mere fifty dragoons. When the Royalists tried to lay an ambush, the local people kept the Parliamentarians informed. When, his main force confronted the Royalists, who betrayed their own position by their lighted musket matches, Corbet's dragoons "were presentlie disordered and many of them ran awaye withoute ever giving fire." He thought Aston was wounded and both he and Corbet had been captured briefly but were able to escape under cover of darkness to Over, abandoning their arms in the process. He considered his own troops' performance "far beyonde what could bee expected of us," considering that they had just marched from Leek. The participants differed little over facts but considerably over interpretation. The behaviour of the Royalist commanders led to accusations of cowardice, but was just as easily interpreted as prudence. Certainly Corbet's disobedience at Whitchurch the previous week had saved his small force from being completely cut off in hostile territory. Harrington again pointed out the obvious weaknesses: "I was hartily sorry to see S'^{r} Vincent Corbett so poorly furnished with raw Soldiers and Young Commanders."

=== Campaigns ===
Corbet's force seems to have grown in size and experience and was in regular service around Whitchurch during March, suffering considerable losses. In May a Parliamentarian raiding party surprised Corbet's force at dusk at Market Drayton,

entered the towne theye havinge neither garde nor scouts abroad (but secure as theye thoughte). And killed nyne of them, tooke many p'soners, horses and armes. Soe that also a most of Namptwich foote soldyers were horsed home and many of them had two and three or four musketts and karbines a piece. Besides app'all (apparel) and other goods of theires. And alsoe three ensignes, four drums and other weapons. But Sir Vincent fled in his shirte and wascot, leaving his app'all behind him which Capt: Whitney had with his money and many letters in his pockett.

However, experience was making Corbet's force more effective, so that Brereton remarked of one encounter: "the Shropshire horse and Dragoons came on with great resolution and boldness, and in very good order." In July Corbet was authorised to raise a thousand infantry. The enlarged and more versatile force was able to make a much more effective contribution to Royalist efforts in the region, where the tide of battle flowed to and fro constantly, but the progress of the war was ultimately a question of taking and holding ground, particularly the patchwork of fortresses and strongpoints. The propaganda war was also important in holding territory and populations, and Ottley at Shrewsbury was accused by Royalist headquarters at Oxford of slacking in the face of a torrent of Parliamentarian newspapers and pamphlets.

Parliament had been reorganising to retake Shropshire, establishing a Parliamentary committee for the county in February. It contained two Corbets: Sir John Corbet and Robert Corbet (died 1676), Sir Vincent's first cousin. In April it was federated with its counterparts in Warwickshire and Staffordshire, and in late summer, the support of Brereton allowed the committee to gain its first foothold in its native county, at the unfortified market town of Wem. By the autumn, the Royalists had regained the initiative in the region but both Wem and Nantwich withstood repeated assaults. Early in 1644 Prince Rupert brought a large cavalry force to the area, ousted Ottley and set about reconquering Shropshire and Cheshire. The Royalists did well while he was present, but he was constantly diverted to other crises, and the Parliamentarians made steady gains when the pressure was off. An incident involving Sir Vincent Corbet, probably in the early summer, illustrates his continuing humanity and respect for family in a situation of now total war. Under a Parliamentary ordinance, 13 captured Irish soldiers had been hanged. Subsequently, some parliamentarians were captured by Rupert's forces and he ordered 13 to be hanged as a reprisal.

They cast the dice on a drum head, to see who should dye, and amongst them there was one Phillip Litleton, who had been servant and keeper of the parke to my old master, Robert Corbett of Stanwardine, Esqr. This Phillip saw Sir Vincent Corbett, of Morton Corbett, ride by, and said to some that stood by, "if Sir Vincent Corbett did know that I were here, hee would save my life." Upon this a charitable soldier roade after Sir Vincent and told him what one of the prisoners sayed. Hee came back immediately, and seeing Phillip, hee alighted from his horse and fell on his knees beefore the Prince, (who sate there on horsebacke to see the execution,) and beggd for the life of Phillip, which was readily granted on condition hee would never beare arms against the King. Phillip promised and escaped, and afterwards noe more Irish were hangd.

He seems to have spent the summer and autumn of 1644 fighting to hold back the slow Parliamentarian advance while constantly hampered by lack of accurate information or clear strategy. A letter of 23 August reflects this constant chasing of rumours.

This morning I heard from Wem and there strength is not above five hundered foote and foure troopes of Horse theire largest peece is two thousand weight, ye other two are small ones they make noe preparation for removing yet. but as soone as they doe I hope to have intelligence they brag much and threaten hard yt they will swallow us all up with yt greate gun, but in this place we feare them not, depending upon your releefe. They say Colonell Marrow is slayne yt Lord Birom is taken and ouer force at Leverpoole beaten but I heare fromwards ye Wich, ye contrary and yt theare hath many teares falne from ye woemen and widdowes theare aboute fr ye sertentey of ouer best newes I desire you will send so in haste I rest.

=== Parliamentary advance and victory ===
Moreton Corbet Castle, Corbet's seat, was repeatedly damaged during the Civil War as it was one of the contested strongpoints between Wem and Shrewsbury. However, Corbet was not at home when it fell to Wem's small garrison in September 1644. The operation was led by William Reinking, a Dutch professional soldier retained by the Parliamentarians. Mounting one of the fortifications by surprise, five determined attackers made as much noise and confusion as possible, hurling hand grenades at the defenders to pen them indoors and convince them that a large force had broken in. The castle fell, with the loss of only one Parliamentarian and a huge quantity of arms and ammunition was taken.

The decline of Royalist control in the region now had a political and ideological, as well as a military, aspect. When Rupert and his brother Prince Maurice brought a large force, Bridgnorth refused to admit them and Much Wenlock refused to supply food. This reflected increasing disenchantment at lower levels: when the Bridgnorth garrison tried to requisition supplies at Tong and Shifnal,

Sir Morton Brigges encouraged the Parishioners to resist and a scuffle ensued, in which most of the soldiers were wounded, and disarmed, and called Popish Dogs. They were kept Prisoners for five or six hours...

By the end of the year, groups of "clubmen" were operating in the south of Shropshire as a more organised response to the plunder and extortion practised by the soldiers.

When Maurice took away part of the Shrewsbury garrison to campaign in Cheshire in February 1645, the Parliamentary committee saw their chance. As Corbet was away on campaign, probably with Maurice, he avoided capture by Parliamentarians, who surprised a meeting of the county's commissioners of array at Apley Hall, home of Sir Thomas Whitmore, 1st Baronet, on 21 February and took them prisoner. The following day, soldiers lent by Brereton and commanded by Thomas Mytton were set to storm Shrewsbury. However, Reinking exploited an entrance provided by Sir William Owen, a former MP and tenant of the council house, and seized control with minimum bloodshed, opening the gates to the main force. Significantly, the Roundheads refrained from looting, as they considered the townspeople essentially well-disposed towards Parliament.

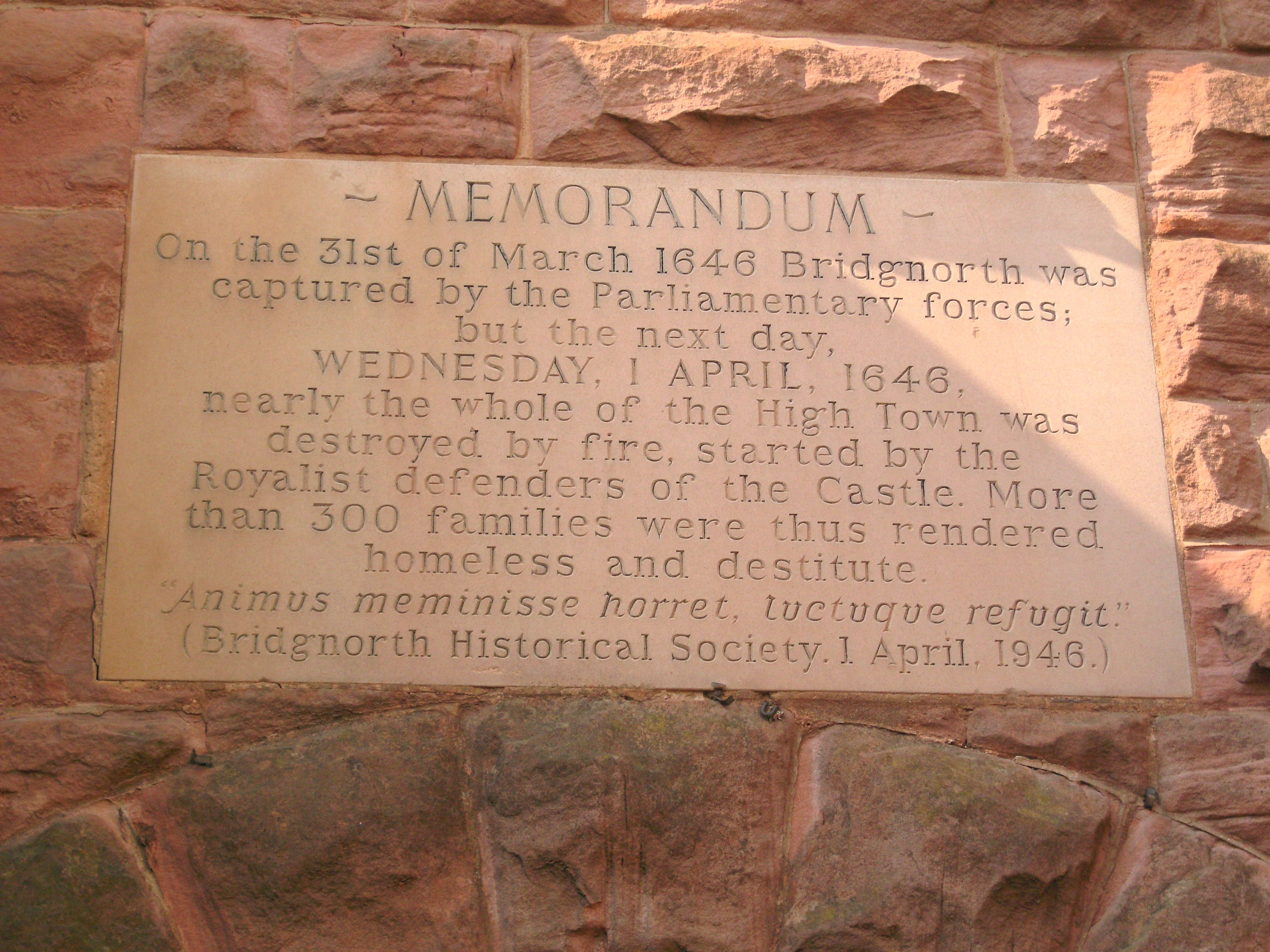
Inscription on Bridgnorth museum, detailing the Royalist destruction of the town in 1646.

The Shrewsbury Foot, the infantry recruited by Corbet, were present at the decisive Battle of Naseby later in the year, although it is unlikely Corbet was with them. However, he is known to have been present in May 1646 at the siege of Bridgnorth, where he was accompanied by his relative, John Corbet, the son and heir of the Parliamentarian Sir John. The defenders retreated into the castle and Sir Thomas Wolryche, 1st Baronet ordered the town itself to be burnt to ground to deny it to the enemy, allegedly making more than 300 families homeless. The Royalist garrison were finally forced to come to terms as the Parliamentarians began to undermine the castle. The "Bridgnorth articles," negotiated by deputations from both sides, allowed the garrison the choice of peace or exile. For Corbet, as for most of the others, it was to be peace, but at considerable cost.

=== Aftermath of war ===
Corbet was compelled to compound for delinquency to regain his sequestrated estates. The fine was one-sixth of the value of the estates, assessed as £2,822. This was reduced by £433 in respect of Corbet's debts, which added up to £9,200. Despite the rebate and the relatively low rate of the levy under the Bridgnorth articles, this was still a large sum, if dwarfed by existing debts. Augusta Corbet, the family historian, characterises his later years as "greatly embittered by debt." His problems were exacerbated by the difficulty in providing settlements for his five daughters, of whom four married.

Despite his difficulties, Corbet was said to be ready to help seize Shrewsbury for Charles II in 1654. However, he did not actively support the Royalist Penruddock uprising of March 1655.

== Death ==
Corbet died at the age of 39 at Exeter House, on the Strand, London on 28 December 1656. His body was returned to Moreton Corbet, where it was buried in St Bartholomew's church on 21 January 1657. His mother outlived him by about three months and was buried at Moreton Corbet in March. Corbet had placed the estates under the management of trustees: his brother-in-law, Francis Thornes; his younger brother, Arthur; and Richard Baddeley, a friend. As his eldest surviving son and heir, Sir Vincent Corbet, 2nd Baronet, was well below the age of majority – probably 14 or 15 – the trustees now took over active management of the estates. Shortly before his death, Corbet had made an indenture committing the family lands in Buckinghamshire, to his trustees specifically to generate marriage portions for his daughters: £2000 for Elizabeth and £1000 each for the others. These estates were centred on the manor of Linslade, now in Bedfordshire, which had returned to Sir Vincent's control after the death of his grandmother and great-aunt, Judith Austin, in 1642. Thornes soon began to manipulate the management of the estates in a way that alienated the other trustees, who resigned, and the Corbet family, who went to the Court of Chancery for redress in 1659. They alleged that, as well as running the estates primarily for his own enrichment, Thornes had deliberately set the young Vincent against his mother, so that he now refused to see her. The issue seems to have dragged on unresolved. Thornes used his position to arrange the marriage of his own daughter, Elizabeth, to the young baronet, her first cousin.

== Marriage and family ==
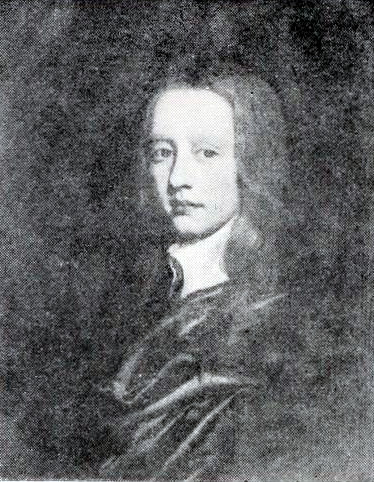
Sir Vincent Corbet (1670–1688), 3rd Baronet of Moreton Corbet, Shropshire. At his early death, the baronetcy became extinct.

Alumni Oxonienses asserts that Corbet obtained a licence to marry Jane Acton, daughter of John Acton, citizen and goldsmith on 15 July 1642. However, when he married, it was to Sarah Monson, daughter of Sir Robert Monson (died 1638), of North Carlton, a short distance NNW of Lincoln. Sir Robert was a litigious former MP for Lincoln, suspected of Recusant sympathies. An important landowner in both Lincolnshire and Yorkshire, he was predeceased by his only son, leaving Sarah and her four sisters as co-heiresses. Lady Sarah Corbet long outlived her husband and was created Viscountess Corbet for life in 1679. Shortly after, with most of her children dead, she married for the second time, to Sir Charles Lee of Edmonton, Middlesex. She died in 1682 and was buried at Edmonton on 10 June. Lee died and was buried in the same place in 1700.

The children of Sir Vincent and Lady Sarah Corbet were mostly born during the Civil War or its immediate aftermath: unlike earlier generations, their christenings are not included in the Moreton Corbet parish register. They were:

- Andrew Corbet died young.
- Sir Vincent Corbet, 2nd Baronet, married Elizabeth Thornes, the daughter and coheiress of Francis Thornes of Shelvock, Shropshire. he died of smallpox in London on 4 February 1681 and was buried at Moreton Corbet on 24 February 1681.

- Sir Vincent Corbet' 3rd Baronet, his son and heir, died without issue in 1688, at the age of 18, while a student at Christ Church, Oxford. With his death the baronetcy became extinct.

- Robert Corbet was a barrister. He was admitted to Lincoln's Inn on 30 November 1668. He died in London on 24 May 1678 and was buried at Moreton Corbet on 7 June.
- Elizabeth Corbet married Sir John Bolles, 3rd Baronet of Scampton, Lincolnshire, a wealthy landowner: Sir John had a secure income of £3,000 a year.
- Mary Corbet married Sir Thomas Estcourt in 1678. Estcourt was MP twice for Malmesbury and once for Bath. Noted for his unwise drinking, he was accused but cleared of involvement in the Popish Plot and later suffered loss of office because of his support of James II.
- Sarah Corbet married Phineas Fowke M.D. of Brewood, Staffordshire.
- Diana Corbet married a Mr. Roche.
- Rachell Corbet was the only daughter not to marry and was buried at St Chad's Shrewsbury in 1706, where the register confirms her status as "gent. and Spinster."

== Footnotes ==
Parliament of England
Vacant Parliament suspended since 1629	Member of Parliament for Shropshire; 1640; With: William Pierrepont	Succeeded by Sir Richard Lee, 2nd Baronet; Sir John Corbet, 1st Baronet
Baronetage of England
New creation	Baronet (of Moreton Corbet); 1642–1656	Succeeded by Vincent Corbet
