= Robert Corbet (died 1676) =

English politician

Robert Corbet (died April 1676) was an English politician who supported Parliament in the English Civil War. He was a member of the Shropshire county committee, responsible for pursuing the war against the royalists and represented Shropshire in the First Protectorate Parliament. He is particularly known as the employer and mentor of Richard Gough, author of the Antiquities and Memoirs of the Parish of Myddle, a pioneering work of ethnographic literature, in which he is mentioned repeatedly.

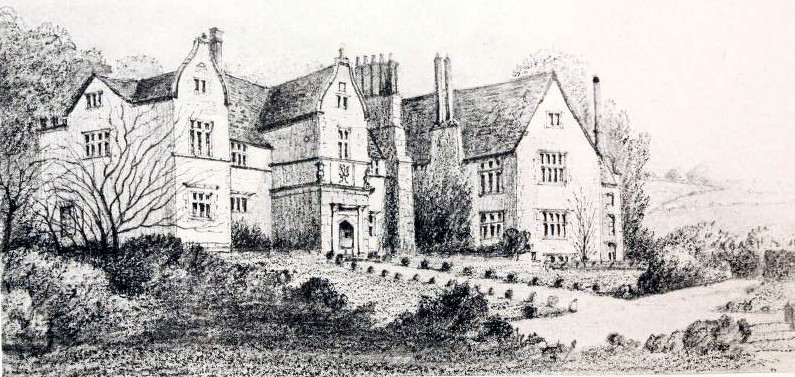
Stanwardine Hall, Shropshire: the home of Robert Corbet and his family. From a drawing of 1901.

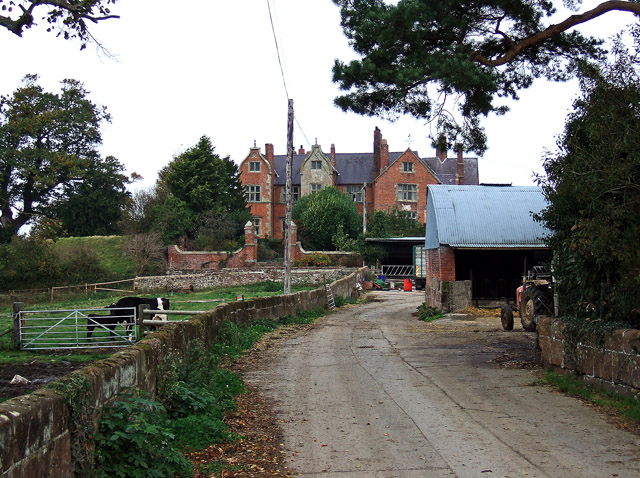
Stanwardine Hall today. After its sale by the second Thomas Corbet it became a farmhouse.

== Background, education and early life ==
Robert Corbet's background was in the landed gentry of Shropshire, a county which had no resident aristocracy in the 16th century, and acquired one only slowly through the sale of honours by James I and Charles I. His parents were cousins once removed, both members of the powerful Corbet family.

- Thomas Corbet of Stanwardine Hall, at Stanwardine in the Woods, near Baschurch, Shropshire. The Stanwardine branch of the Corbets were founded by Thomas's father, the first Robert Corbet of Stanwardine, a younger brother of the notable Elizabethan period Shropshire MP and administrator Sir Andrew Corbet of Moreton Corbet Castle, Shropshire. Thomas Corbet died in 1615 and is buried in Baschurch parish church.
- Margaret Corbet, daughter of Sir Vincent Corbet of Moreton Corbet, and granddaughter of the first Sir Andrew. She had a brother, also Sir Andrew Corbet, who was also a notable MP for Shropshire. The Corbets of Moreton Corbet remained powerful and influential in the county, but had struggled financially at least since the time of Richard Corbet (died 1606), Sir Vincent's spendthrift elder brother, who left debts of more than £6000. Richard Gough referred to Margaret as Elizabeth, which may have been another of her names but could be simply a slip, as Robert Corbet's wife was named Elizabeth: both names were used for his daughters.

Robert Corbet's birth date is unknown, but the dating of his career suggests the first decade of the 17th century, possibly the last years of the 16th century. Gough calls him a Master in Chancery, which would have necessitated a considerable period of a legal training and of practice in London.

=== Family tree ===
Corbet's relationship to other politically important Shropshire Corbets, particularly those of the Civil war period, is illustrated in the family tree below.

Robert Corbet: his ancestry and relatives

Sir Robert Corbet (d.1513) of Moreton Corbet	Elizabeth Vernon (d.1563)
Anne Windsor	Roger Corbet of Moreton Corbet and Linslade	Richard Corbet of Poynton	Margaret Savile	Reginald Corbet of Stoke	Alice Gratewood
Jane Needham	Sir Andrew Corbet of Moreton Corbet	Robert Corbet of Stanwardine	Jane Kynaston	Jerome Corbet of Beslow	Dorothy Poyner	Richard Corbet	Anne Bromley
Robert Corbet (died 1583)	Richard Corbet (died 1606)	Judith Austin	William Boothby	Sir Vincent Corbet	Frances Humfreston	Sir John Corbet, 1st Bart., Puritan and Parliamentarian
Elizabeth Boothby	Sir Andrew Corbet, Parliamentarian	Margaret Corbet	Thomas Corbet of Stanwardine	Sir John Corbet, 2nd Baronet, Cavalier
Sarah Monson	Sir Vincent Corbet, 1st Baronet, Cavalier	Elizabeth Ludlow	Robert Corbet of Stanwardine, lawyer and Parliamentarian

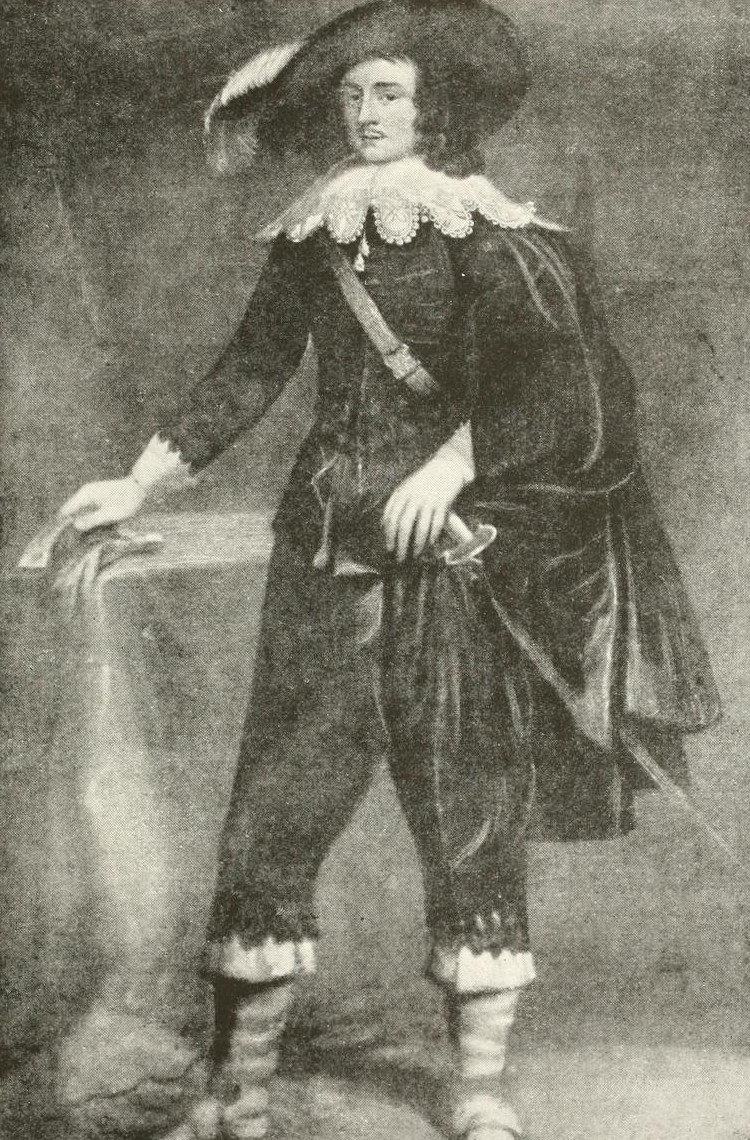
Sir Andrew Corbet (1580–1637) of Moreton Corbet, Shropshire: Robert Corbet's uncle. An MP who opposed the absolutist policies of Charles I.

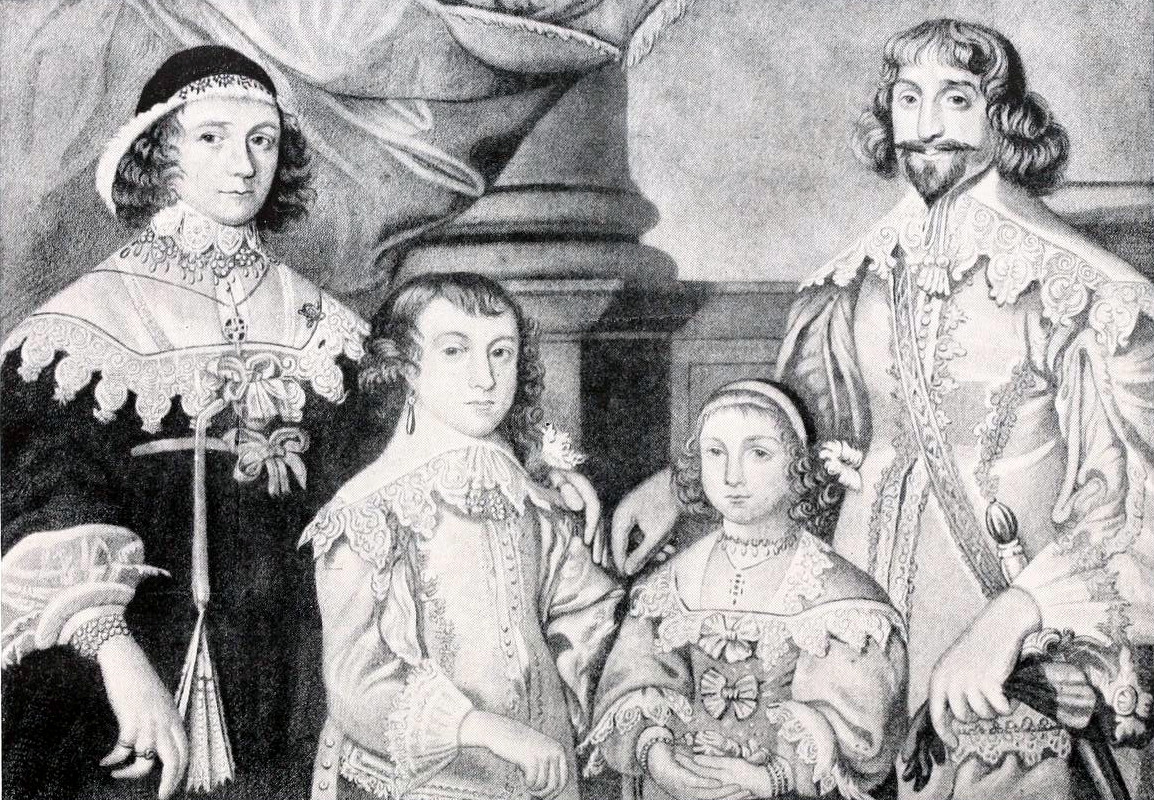
Sir Francis Ottley, royalist military governor of Shrewsbury at the beginning of the English Civil War, with his wife, Lucy, and children, Richard and Mary. From a portrait by Petrus Troueil, 1636.

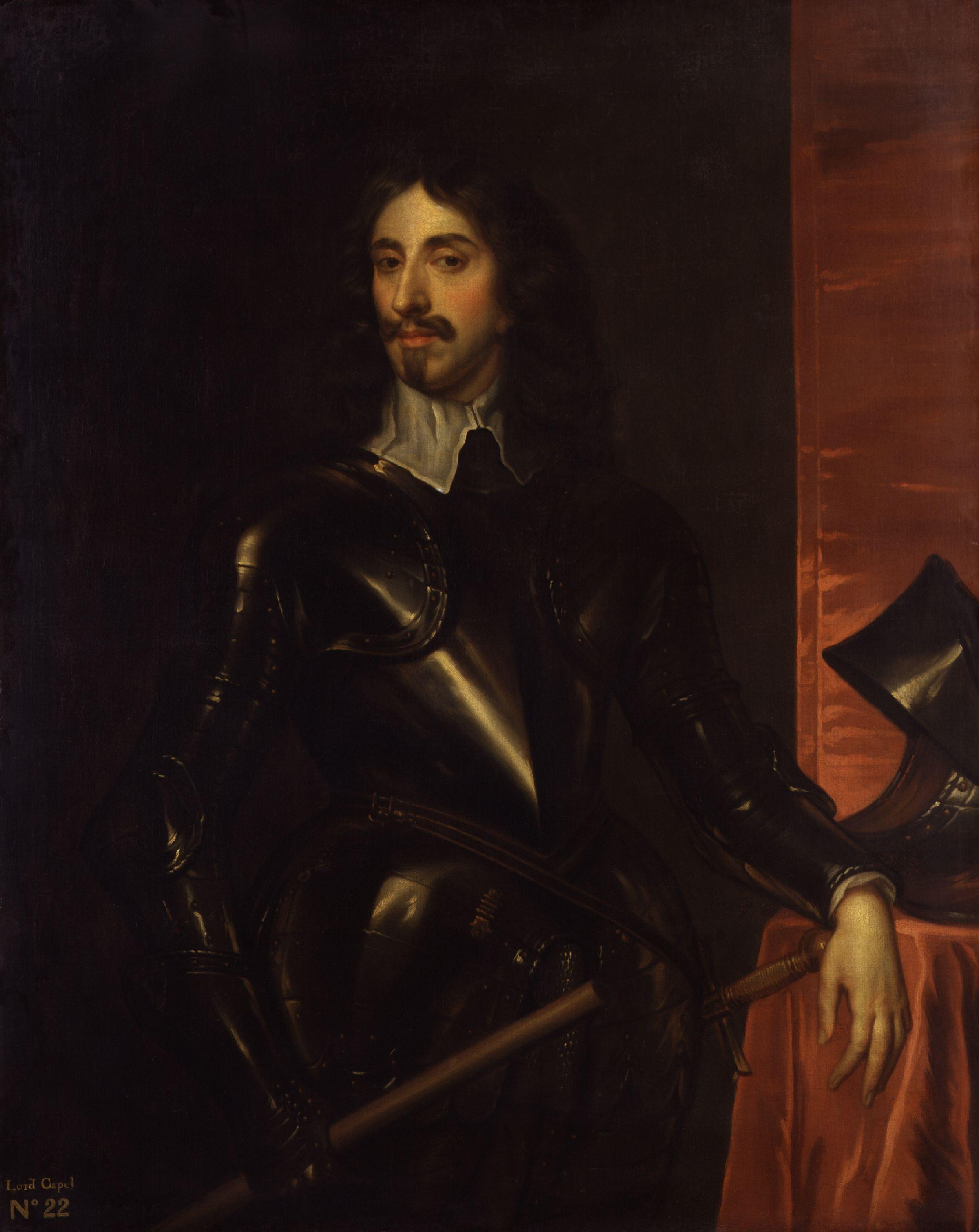
Lord Capel, the royalist commander whose assault on Wem provoked a levée en masse.

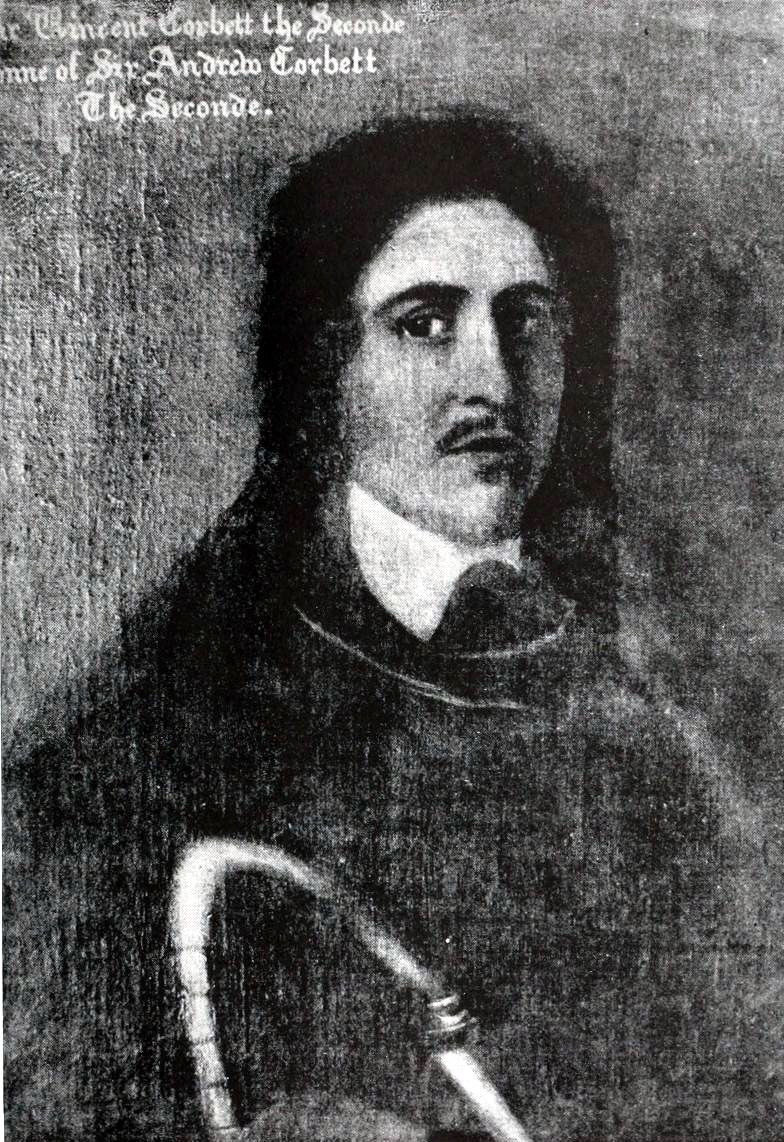
Sir Vincent Corbet, 1st Baronet of Moreton Corbet, Shropshire. A royalist cavalry commander and Robert Corbet's cousin.

== Political career ==
=== Offices held ===
Corbet was High Sheriff of Shropshire in 1636, during the period of Charles I's absolute monarchy, known as Thorough, when he was compelled to make ship money returns to the government in London. This would mean he was pricked in November 1635, while a second cousin, Sir John Corbet, was held in the Fleet Prison for resisting extra-Parliamentary taxation. His tenure of the shrievalty suggests that Robert Corbet was not as yet a known opponent of the regime, as the appointment lay in the hands of central government and nominations were vetted by the Lord Lieutenant of the county, the staunchly royalist John Egerton, 1st Earl of Bridgewater. It also confirms that Robert Corbet was by this time resident in Shropshire. Oddly, Augusta Corbet, the family historian, states that Corbet died in 1636. This may be because a Robert Corbet, probably his first son, was buried that year at Baschurch. So it is likely that he had recently returned to Shropshire and married.

Gough's recital of Corbet's offices states that he was ”Justice of Peace and quorum Custos Rotulorum of this County, and a Master in Chancery.” Corbet is not included in recent lists of the custodes of Shropshire. However, there is a wide lacuna between the last mention of Bridgewater as custos in 1636 and the appointment of Francis, Lord Newport in 1660. There is no doubt surrounding his activities as a JP: he was frequently present at the Quarter Sessions, especially during the Interregnum.

=== The Civil War ===
On the outbreak of civil war, the town of Shrewsbury and its county fell into royalist hands, as the king had opened serious hostilities by taking advantage of a policy of non-resistance, declared by the largely Puritan and parliamentarian but deeply worried town council of Shrewsbury on 30 August. He led his main field army from Nottingham, where he had raised his standard on 23 August 1642, to Shrewsbury, which he occupied on 20 September. When the royalist army departed on 12 October, the town was left under a royalist garrison, with Sir Francis Ottley as military governor. The king and Ottley issued a series of proscription lists, outlawing a wide range of Puritans and Parliamentarian sympathisers in the county. These proved more numerous than the king's warm welcome at Shrewsbury had suggested, not least because the royalist soldiers were ill-paid and took to looting in both towns and countryside. Robert Corbet's name appears in Ottley's papers on a list of ten indicted at the Spring assizes of 1643 for acts of disloyalty. He was "charged for speaking certain words tending to treason" on the word of Sir Paul Harris, 2nd Baronet, of Boreatton. The editor was unconvinced that this was Robert Corbet of Stanwardine, apparently unaware of his record as a Roundhead, but could suggest no one else. As he was bailed by two of the most eminent men in the region, Richard Newport, 1st Baron Newport and Timothy Turner, it is most likely that it was him. It is not likely that he appeared to face the accusation; by the time of the assizes he was already a member of Shropshire's parliamentary committee, which was set up in February 1643 and federated with its counterparts in Staffordshire and Warwickshire in April.

The committee was an expansion of or replacement for the triumvirate of William Pierrepont, Sir John Corbet, and Richard More, appointed to the county by parliament in July 1642. Sir John and More, both seasoned opponents of the king and of William Laud, remained central to the committee. As well as Robert Corbet it included Thomas Hunt, the MP for Shrewsbury; the soldier Thomas Mytton of Halston; the lawyer Humphrey Mackworth; and Andrew Lloyd of Aston near Oswestry. The committee found it difficult to gain a foothold in its own county, mainly because the parliamentary commander in the region, Basil Feilding, 2nd Earl of Denbigh was lethargic and was soon accused of disloyalty. However, the committee members decided to act on their own initiative. With the support of Sir William Brereton, who commanded the parliamentary forces in Cheshire, Mytton, Mackworth and Hunt established a small garrison at the small market town of Wem around the end of August. In October they withstood a determined assault by royalist troops under Lord Capel. The townspeople rallied behind the defenders and a rhyme declared:

The women of Wem, and a few musketeers,
Beat the Lord Capel, and all his Cavaliers.

Robert Corbet seems to have moved to Wem immediately and stayed there throughout the greater part of the fighting. In December he and Lloyd wrote to Mackworth, who was in London for Laud's trial, pointing out that both Wem and Nantwich were under threat, the countryside was being plundered and Irish troops were reinforcing the royalists. They asked him to "represent our forlorne condition to the Parliament, for whom we have desperately engaged our estates and lives." January 1644 brought some relief, as Brereton and Lord Faifax came to the rescue of Wem, while Mytton defeated a royalist force at Ellesmere. Pressure was renewed in March, when Prince Rupert of the Rhine arrived in Shropshire to shore up the royalist position. The fighting of Spring 1644 occasioned one of Gough's best-known anecdotes, involving one of Robert Corbet's employees, who had evidently followed him to war. Parliament had ordered the hanging of captured Irish soldiers and 13 were executed, including two taken at Myddle. Subsequently, some parliamentarian soldiers were captured by Rupert's men.

The next day the Prince caused these prisoners to bee brought before him, and ordered thirteen of them to bee hangd. They cast the dice on a drum head, to see who should dye, and amongst them there was one Phillip Litleton, who had been servant and keeper of the parke to my old master, Robert Corbett of Stanwardine, Esqr. This Phillip saw Sir Vincent Corbett, of Morton Corbett, ride by, and said to some that stood by, “if Sir Vincent Corbett did know that I were here, hee would save my life." Upon this a charitable soldier roade after Sir Vincent and told him what one of the prisoners sayed. Hee came back immediately, and seeing Phillip, hee alighted from his horse and fell on his knees beefore the Prince, (who sate there on horsebacke to see the execution,) and beggd for the life of Phillip, which was readily granted on condition hee would never beare arms against the King. Phillip promised and escaped, and afterwards noe more Irish were hangd.

Rupert's force was drawn away to help the royalists at York and was part of the army defeated by the parliamentary forces at the Battle of Marston Moor on 2 July 1644. However, he was able to escape with most of his troops and was soon back in the West Midlands. Divisions were appearing on both sides: Rupert was forced to replace the governor of Shrewsbury twice and the Shropshire committee began to fracture, with most of the members alienated from the high-handed Mytton. The committee members initially concealed from Mytton their evolving plans for the taking of Shrewsbury, where discontent with the royalist regime was prevalent. They had difficulty maintaining their small garrisons at Moreton Corbet and Stoke upon Tern as they gathered resources for the attack on the county town. Not until February 1645 were they able to take Shrewsbury, largely through the work of the Dutch professional soldier William Reinking, who exploited an entrance provided by Sir William Owen, a former MP and tenant of the Council house. However, Mytton claimed the credit and he and Reinking wrote their own divergent accounts of the venture.

With the fall of Shrewsbury, the Shropshire parliamentary committee was at last able to install itself at the centre of the county. They were turned into an ad hoc town council and elected Mackworth governor, passing over Mytton, a local man who might have had a good claim to the post. Corbet seems to have been an ally of Mackworth: they were together publicly at quarter sessions and parliament until Mackworth's death in December 1654.

=== Puritanism ===
Much of Corbet's public life after Parliament's victory in the First English Civil War revolved around the imposition of a Presbyterian structure on the Church in Shropshire and the maintenance of public order as a justice of the peace. Gough seems to suggest he was a moderate Puritan. Thomas More was installed as Rector of Myddle by Bridgewater and fled during fighting in the area.

During his absence, his places were slenderly and seldom served. About the year 1646, or soone after, the Parliament (having gained the upper hand of the King's forces,) began to displace all scandalous and insufficient ministers, and all malignants, (for so they called all such as had adhered to the King,) whereupon Mr. More came into the country seeking to retain his places. Hee was entertained by Robert Corbett Esq., who had a great respect for him, upon the account of his excellent preaching. During his stay, he preached every Lord's day in Cockshutt chappell. But notwithstanding Mr. Corbett's and his own endeavours, hee was outed of both his places, and preaching his farewell sermon in the said chappell, (because hee could not be admitted into either of his parish churches,) hee went back again to London, and never returned again into this country.

However royalist More's sympathies, he seems to have fled to London, the centre of Parliamentary power for safety, so he is unlikely to have been an extreme Laudian. Gough's point is not that Corbet was indifferent or universally tolerant but that his main concern was good preaching.

Although moderate, Corbet's recorded religious affinities are all Puritan. He must have taken the Solemn League and Covenant, committing him to a Presbyterian church order, with the other parliamentarians before the occupation of Wem. This would have excluded him from public life after the Sedition Act 1661 demanded the Covenant be forsworn by all officials. Baschurch and Myddle were among the parishes assigned to the second classis when Shropshire's churches were reorganised on Presbyterian lines in 1646. Corbet's name was placed second in the list of "those fit to be of the second classis", i.e. an Elder of the church in his classis. However, the reorganisation was never fully operational and the fourth classis, in the neighbouring north-eastern part of Shropshire, was one of the few in the country to become fully operational by 1648. On 22 August 1654 an ordinance was passed to set up county commissions to eject incompetent or immoral ministers. Corbet was named as one of the 21 commissioners for Shropshire. However, no record remains of the commissioners' work, although six incumbents are known to have been removed.

Gough records that Corbet was responsible for installing Richard Ralphs as Parish Register at Myddle during the Interregnum. After the restoration Ralphs was removed from office and fined for denouncing a village maypole, although the basis of the treason charge he at first faced was that he claimed “it was as greate a sin to sett up a May-pole, as it was to cut of the King's head” - words he actually denied. Ralphs was apparently at first incensed by the drunkenness of the revellers. Shropshire Puritans were as much concerned with the problems of public order as suppressing idolatry.

=== Public order ===
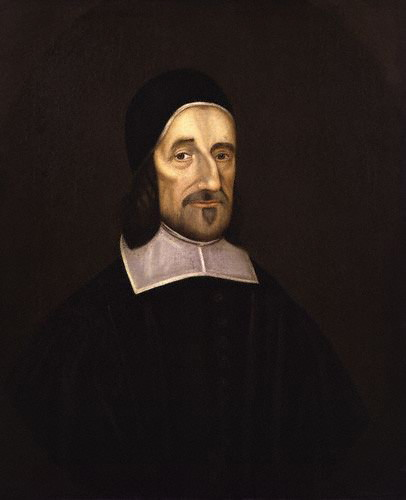
Richard Baxter, the Puritan theologian and preacher, accompanied the Parliamentarian force to Wem and later preached to the assizes at Shrewsbury. He was an important moral influence in the region and a friend of James Berry, whom he rebuked for tolerating Quakers.

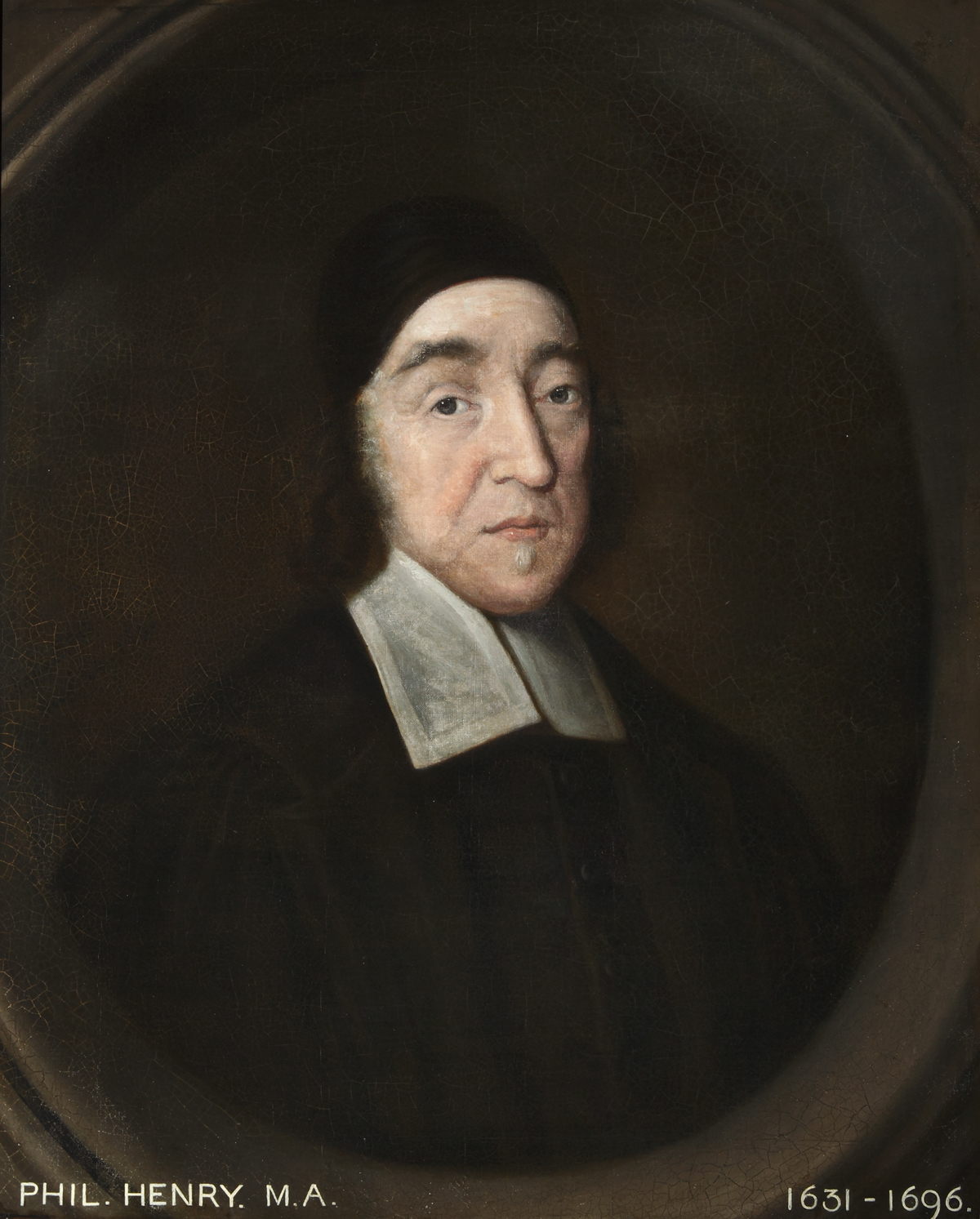
Philip Henry, the Puritan preacher and pastor who visited Corbet at Stanwardine on several occasions in his later years.

The public conflation of good order with “godliness” seems to have reached it peak in 1656, during the Rule of the Major-Generals, when James Berry, an Independent, was the regional representative of central government. Berry prevailed on the magistrates to issue declarations of intent. Corbet was one of those who signed an order to suppress undesirable alehouses. Richard Baxter preached at the Spring assizes of that year on the duty of magistrates to uphold virtue and suppress vice. With Berry, Corbet was on the bench at Shrewsbury on 8 January, when no less than six alesellers were suppressed throughout the county. However, if there was an onslaught on innocent pleasures, it did not last long. Corbet was also present at the next Quarter sessions, when, fresh from Baxter's sermon, the bench suppressed no ales sellers but granted a new licence to sell ale to one Richard Wicherley of Berghill. The pattern was much the same throughout the century and had little to do with specifically Puritan preoccupations. In 1640 a grand jury had set out guidelines for the corporations and justices: essentially to reduce ale outlets to a reasonable number and to enforce weights and measures legislation. There was also a concern about “tippling” on Sunday, expressed in 1707 as much as in 1652. None of this was new: Corbet's great uncle Richard took up similar issues in 1596. Actual punishments in connection with ale selling were restricted largely those who broke the licensing laws. Corbet chaired the bench in April 1657, when Bartholomew Poyner was fined 20 shillings for selling ale without a licence, although three other alesellers were licensed, bringing in £20 for the public purse. Corbet also chaired the next sessions, when Poyner was brought before the court for a second offence and condemned to a public whipping if he failed to pay his fine, as well as three days in prison. Corbet and his fellow Puritans on the bench were zealous rather than severe. The local Puritan leadership certainly did not have an austere attitude to food and drink: Major-General Berry was entertained well at two inns during his stay, the second feast costing £14.

Corbet seems to have been effective away from the bench, using his forensic skills to pursue graft and negligence in public office. In 1647 Parliament had clamped down on the neglect of church buildings, prescribing fines of 40s. for churchwardens who allowed their churches to decay and on impropriators who failed to maintain chancels. In January 1654 the Quarter Sessions made Corbet responsible for surveying the chancel at Baschurch and ensuring that the impropriators paid for repairs. He pursued the matter over more than 3 years until Hendry Chambers, one of the impropriators, was fined 40 shillings and threatened with imprisonment unless he carried out repairs. The Michaelmas sessions of 1657 deputed Corbet to interview Stephen Hatchet and Thomas Adams, the former surveyors of Highways at Ellesmere, who were in dispute over the accounts. The job of surveyor was unpaid and unpopular, but seems to have afforded opportunities for personal enrichment. Hatchet had been bound over to "perfect his accounts" as long ago as January 1656., and even imprisoned for a time, although he was released when Corbet chaired the bench at Easter 1657, on condition that he report to Corbet himself. Adams was ordered to hand over the £2 10s. remaining from their time in office to his successors but then claimed he was still owed money by Hatchet. However, the pair proved elusive and, in January 1658, Corbet had to obtain an order to force them to appear before him. At Easter, the matter was still pending but in July Corbet secured a judgement that Hatchet should repay the parish 30 shillings, while three others were ordered to pay 10 shillings each. Even this was not the end of the matter, for Hatchet and Adams continued to quarrel and the Michaelmas 1658 sessions delegated Corbet to mediate. Finally, in January 1559, three years after the case first appeared in the magistrate's records, the court discharged Hatchet, the matter settled. There were a number of references to Corbet of such disputes, involving resolution of debt and personal or social conflict - an important part of the day-to-day business of local government during The Protectorate.

Corbet appeared at the Quarter Sessions for the last time in Spring 1659 and then disappeared from public life. By the following year, the parliamentarians had been purged from the administration of justice in the county and the new regime took over.

Philip Henry, a moderate Puritan ordained as a Presbyterian minister at Prees, Shropshire in 1657, was a visitor at Stanwardine in the years after the Restoration, when he was ejected from his living. In 1670 he paid a pastoral visit after Corbet's grandson, also called Robert, died of smallpox. He was welcomed by the Corbets exactly a year later.

with wife at Stanwardine – much made of there but little good done, by reason of a vayn, unfixt, unfruitful heart. I accompanied them in killing a Buck in their own park, far from being taken with any great delight or pleasure in ye Sport, they sent part of him to Broad-Oke after us.

It is unclear whose spiritual state he was criticising, or whether it related to the earlier bereavement: Robert Corbet must have been an old man by this time and it is likely Henry's host for the hunting trip was Thomas Corbet, the heir. In 1672 Henry's meal at Stanwardine, in the company of a few old parliamentarians, was much more to his liking.

=== Member of Parliament ===
Corbet was one of the four members sent to represent Shropshire in the parliament of 1654, the First Protectorate Parliament, under a new allocation of seats. This was a single chamber parliament, established under the Instrument of Government, and members needed £200 in property to qualify. Corbet was accompanied by Mackworth, now a member of Cromwell's Council of State, Mytton and Philip Young, Mackworth's son-in-law. The majority of the members elected were Presbyterian in inclination. Parliament assembled on 3 September. Gough summarises the events of the parliament:

..hee was once chosen a Knight for the Shire, and served in Parliament, where they presented the Protector with twenty-four Acts; hee was willing to signe some of them, but not all; butt the Parliament had voted that all should be signed or none. The Protector tooke time to consider untill next day, and then hee came to the parliament house with a frowneing countenance, and with many opprobriouse termes dissolved them and gave them the carrecter of a packe of stubberne knaves.

The parliament and Cromwell had very different legislative agendas, with most parliamentarians wishing to dismantle the Instrument of Government. Although a general rundown of garrisons was discussed, Cromwell acknowledged that Shrewsbury was a special case – probably a victory for the lobbying of the local MPs. Mackworth died during the parliament and was buried in Westminster Abbey. Corbet is not mentioned in the House of Commons Journal for the parliament. The parliament was dismissed after five lunar months, the minimum allowed by the Instrument, with no legislation passed.

== Marriage and family ==
Robert Corbet married Elizabeth Ludlow, daughter of Henry Ludlow (died 1643) of Maiden Bradley, Wiltshire. Her brother was Edmund Ludlow, the regicide.

Robert and Elizabeth Corbet had a son and four daughters who survived them. Probably three sons predeceased them.

- Robert Corbet (d. 1636)
- Thomas Corbet married Mary Gerard of Hampshire. He sold Stanwardine to Sir John Wynn, 5th Baronet, allegedly as a result of a bet, and the family moved to Worcestershire.
- Letitia Corbet, referred to as "Mrs Lettice" by Gough, presumably married.
- Elizabeth Corbet (d. 1713) married George Clive of Walford, near Baschurch.
- Margaret Corbet
- Mary Corbet
- Andrew Corbet predeceased parents.
- Robert Corbet predeceased parents.

== Footnotes ==
Parliament of England
Preceded by William Bottrell; Thomas Baker	Member of Parliament for Shropshire; 1654; With: Humphrey Mackworth; Thomas Mytton; Philip Young	Succeeded by Thomas Mackworth; Samuel More; Andrew Lloyd; Philip Young
