= Phineas Fowke =

British physician

Phineas Fowke, M.D. (1638–1710), was an English physician.

Fowke was the son of Walter Fowke, M.D. He was born at Bishop Burton, Yorkshire, and there baptised on 7 January 1639. His mother was sister of Sir John Micklethwaite, physician to Charles II and to St. Bartholomew's Hospital. He was admitted at Queens' College, Cambridge, 21 April 1654, graduated B.A. 1658, and on 26 March in the same year was admitted a fellow of the college. His family connections directed him to the profession of medicine, and he graduated M.D. at Cambridge 1668.

He practised in London, residing in Little Britain, and was admitted a fellow of the College of Physicians 12 November 1680. In 1684 he married Sarah, daughter of Sir Vincent Corbet, Baronet, at Shrewsbury. She died 6 December 1686. He retired to his paternal estate in Shropshire, and there died at Little Wyrley Hall 21 January 1710. He was buried in the neighbouring church of Brewood, and his death is recorded on his wife's monument in St. Chad's Church, Shrewsbury. He was learned in theology as well as in medicine, and was an admirer of Dr. Seth Ward, bishop of Sarum, whose views on passive obedience he warmly supported. In some manuscript notes on a sermon of Ward's, on the text "And they that resist shall receive to themselves damnation", Fowke expresses his contempt of the conduct of the University of Oxford in 1688, saying, "These great pretenders to loyalty invited ye Prince of Orange. They had no patience when King James bore upon their privileges in Oxford, but exclamed bitterly against ye king and joyned with the wiggs and dissenters to bring in ye Prince of Orange." Among the Sloane manuscripts in the British Museum there is a private letter of Fowkes.
