= Sir Richard Lee, 2nd Baronet =

English politician

Sir Richard Lee, 2nd Baronet (ca. 1600 – April 1660) was an English politician who sat in the House of Commons from 1640 to 1642. He supported the Royalist side in the English Civil War.

== Early life ==
Lee was the son of Sir Humphrey Lee, 1st Baronet of Langley and Acton Burnell, Shropshire, and his wife Margaret Corbett, daughter of Richard Corbett of Stoke, justice of the King's Bench.

== Career ==
In November 1640, Lee was elected Member of Parliament for Shropshire in the Long Parliament. He was disabled from sitting in parliament on 6 September 1642 for executing a Commission of Array after it was declared illegal. He suffered for his support of the King and had to compound for his estate for £3719. This punitive fine amounted to two-thirds of his total estate, due to his status as a Catholic recusant.

== Personal life ==
Lee married Elizabeth Allen, daughter of Sir Edward Allen, alderman of London. They had two daughters Rachael who married Ralph Cleaton and Mary who married Sir Edward Smythe, 1st Baronet.

Parliament of England
| Preceded by William Pierrepont; Sir Vincent Corbet, 1st Baronet | Member of Parliament for Shropshire; 1640–1642; With: Sir Richard Newport | Succeeded by Sir John Corbet, 1st Baronet, of Stoke upon Tern; Humphrey Edwards |
Baronetage of England
| Preceded by Humphry Lee | Baronet (of Langley); 1831–1660 | Extinct |
