= Thomas Graham Briggs =

British landowner in Barbados and Nevis (1833–1887)

Sir Thomas Graham Briggs, 1st Baronet (30 September 1833 – 11 October 1887) was a Victorian land-owner in the Caribbean with property in Barbados and Nevis.

== Early life ==
Thomas Graham Briggs was born on 30 September 1833 on the British colony of Barbados. He was the only child of Joseph Lyder Briggs (1792 - 1866) and Elizabeth Hinds. Thomas' father was a wealthy landowner in Barbados, serving as a justice of the peace and an honorary Colonel of the St. Lucy regiment of militia.

Joseph Lyder Briggs owned various estates across Barbados, including:

- Fortress, in St. Thomas Parish. Co-owned with John Cutting Packer
- Checker Hall, in St. Lucy Parish.
- Maynard's, in St. Peter Parish.

== Education ==
Thomas attended Codrington College in Barbados, then entered Trinity College, Cambridge on 12 Jan 1852. He earned a Bachelor's Degree in 1856, and left with a Master's in 1862.

Baronetage of the United Kingdom
New creation	Baronet (of Briggs-Dayrell); 1871–1887	Extinct
