= Humphrey Edwards =

Humphrey Edwards (1582–1658) was one of the regicides of King Charles I of England. He joined the parliamentarian side in the English Civil War, finding loyalty to Charles I pecuniarily unprofitable; he was M.P. for Shropshire; signed Charles I's death-warrant, 1649; thrust himself into the chief ushership of the exchequer, 1650; and was commissioner of South Wales, 1651.

== Biography ==
Edwards was the younger son of Thomas Edwards of Shrewsbury, by Ann, widow of Stephen Ducket, and daughter of Humphrey Baskerville, alderman of London. He was admitted to Shrewsbury School in 1615, and to Gray's Inn in 1633, but he was not called to the bar.

Edwards is represented as "having alwaies been a half-faced cavalier, changing his party for his profit". On 17 February 1637 he was appointed a gentleman pensioner to King Charles I of England. In that capacity he was one of the armed men who accompanied Charles I to the House of Commons to arrest the 5 "birds" on 4 January 1642, and was disappointed at not obtaining a reward for attending the king on that expedition. So Edwards took sides with Parliament and was elected member as a Knight of the Shire for Shropshire (probably in the place of Sir Richard Lee (a royalist) who was "disabled to sit"). He became a prominent member of the Independent party, and was not excluded in Pride's Purge. He was nominated one of the commissioners of the high court of justice attended each day of the trial of Charles I, and signed the death-warrant.

After the execution he remained an active member of Parliament, involving himself in the sale of church and crown estates. He hankered after the chief ushership of the exchequer, then held by Clement Walker, and, after vainly soliciting the committee of sequestrations to sequester Walker during his incarceration in the Tower of London, persuaded the committee of revenue to confer the office on him "until the parliament declare their pleasure therein", by an order dated 1 February 1650. On the following 21 March, though the order had not been ratified by parliament, he took forcible possession of Walker's official residence. In 1651 he was appointed to the high court of justice to investigate insurrections in Wales in June 1651. This was his last political appointment and he did not sit in Parliament or have a position in government during the Protectorate. Edwards died in 1658, and was buried at Richmond on 2 August.

== Family ==
Edwards married Hester (died in or before 1658 preceding Edwards), daughter of Roger Pope of Shropshire, in 1623.

Edwards died intestate, his property was granted to his sister, Lucy, Lady Ottley, but for his part in the regicide, although he died before the Restoration he was excepted out of the bill of pardon and oblivion and so his property (now in the possession of Lady Ottley) was confiscated by the crown.
