= Briggs baronets =

Extinct baronetcy in the Baronetage of the United Kingdom

There have been two baronetcies created for persons with the surname Briggs, one in the Baronetage of England and one in the Baronetage of the United Kingdom. Both creations are extinct.

The Briggs (or Brigges) Baronetcy, of Haughton in the County of Shropshire, was created in the Baronetage of England on 12 August 1641 for Morton Briggs. His son, the second Baronet, was Member of Parliament for Wenlock in 1646 and High Sheriff of Shropshire in 1665. The fourth Baronet sat as Member of Parliament for Shropshire, Bridgnorth and Wenlock. The fifth Baronet was High Sheriff of Shropshire in 1747. The title became extinct on his death in 1767.

The Briggs Baronetcy, of Briggs-Dayrell in the Island of Barbados, was created in the Baronetage of the United Kingdom on 27 November 1871 for Thomas Briggs, Member of the Executive Council of Barbados. The title became extinct on his death in 1887.

== Briggs baronets, of Haughton (1641) ==
Escutcheon of the Briggs baronets of Haughton

- Sir Moreton Briggs, 1st Baronet (c. 1587 – c. 1650)
- Sir Humphrey Briggs, 2nd Baronet (c. 1615–1691)
- Sir Humphrey Briggs, 3rd Baronet (c. 1650–1700)
- Sir Humphrey Briggs, 4th Baronet (c. 1670–1734)
- Sir Hugh Briggs, 5th Baronet (c. 1684–1767)

== Briggs baronets, of Briggs-Dayrell (1871) ==
Escutcheon of the Briggs baronets of Briggs-Dayrell

- Sir Thomas Graham Briggs, 1st Baronet (1833–1887)
