= Nicholas Purcell (MP) =

16th-century English politician

Member of the England Parliament for Shrewsbury
- In office 21 October 1555 – 17 November 1588 Serving with George Leigh and Reginald Corbet
- Preceded by: Reginald Corbet
- Succeeded by: Robert Ireland
- In office 5 October 1553 – 5 May 1554 Serving with Reginald Corbet and Richard Mytton
- Preceded by: Himself
- Succeeded by: Robert Ireland
- In office 1 March 1553 – 31 March 1553 Serving with George Leigh
- Preceded by: George Leigh
- Succeeded by: George Leigh
- In office 23 November 1545 – 31 January 1547 Serving with Edward Hosier
- Preceded by: Adam Mytton
- Succeeded by: Reginald Corbet

Personal details
- Born: c. 1503
- Died: 29 August 1559

Nicholas Purcell (c. 1503 – 29 August 1559) was an English politician.

He was a Member (MP) of the Parliament of England for Shrewsbury in 1539, 1545, March 1553, October 1553, April 1554, 1555 and 1558.
