= Richard Purcell (MP) =

16th-century English politician

Nicholas Purcell

Member of the England Parliament for Shrewsbury
- In office 8 May 1572 – 18 April 1583 Serving with George Leigh and Philip Sidney
- Preceded by: Robert Ireland
- Succeeded by: Thomas Owen
- In office 11 January 1563 – 2 January 1567 Serving with George Leigh
- Preceded by: Reginald Corbet
- Succeeded by: Robert Ireland

Personal details
- Born: c. 1526
- Died: 24 November 1586

Richard Purcell (by 1526 – 24 November 1586) was an English politician.

He was a Member (MP) of the Parliament of England for Shrewsbury in 1563 and 1572.
