= Thomas Berwick (disambiguation) =

Thomas Berwick (1825–1891) was a British convict transported to Western Australia.

Thomas Berwick may also refer to:

- Thomas Berwick (MP) for Shrewsbury in 1399
- Thomas Noel Hill, 2nd Baron Berwick
- Tom Berwick, see 2011–12 Coventry City F.C. season

== See also ==
- Thomas Bewick (1753–1828) English engraver and natural history author
