= John Perle =

John Perle may refer to:

- John Perle (died 1402), MP for Dorchester and Dorset
- John Perle (died 1429), MP for Shrewsbury
