= Francis Berkeley =

Francis Berkeley may refer to:

- Francis Berkeley (Shrewsbury MP) (c. 1583–?), English lawyer and MP for Shrewsbury
- Francis Henry FitzHardinge Berkeley (1794–1870), English MP for Bristol
- Francis Berkeley, 2nd Baron FitzHardinge (1826–1896), English MP for Cheltenham, nephew of the above
