= Richard Purcell =

Richard Purcell may refer to:

- Richard Purcell (architect), Irish architect and builder
- Richard Purcell (MP) (died 1586), English politician
- Rick Purcell (born 1959), American politician from Massachusetts
- Dick Purcell (1908–1944), American actor
