= Elisabeth Rivers-Bulkeley =

Austrian stockbroker

Elisabeth Charlotte Marie Rivers-Bulkeley (30 April 1924 – 19 December 2006) was a stockbroker. Born in Austria, she lived most of her life in the United Kingdom. She was one of the first ten women to become a member of the London Stock Exchange, on 26 March 1973. She also wrote and broadcast on financial and investment matters for women.

After she was diagnosed with a terminal illness, she attended the Dignitas clinic in Switzerland, which assisted her to commit suicide.

== Early life ==
She was born Elisabeth (Liesl) Charlotte Marie Neustadtl in Vienna. Her father was a car manufacturer with anti-Nazi views. He disappeared in around 1942, and could not be located after the end of the Second World War. Her mother survived the war.

She was educated at St George's School in Clarens, Switzerland. She won the Austrian women's ice skating championships three times, and later enjoyed skiing and swimming. Aged 14, she visited England in 1938 with the intention of returning to school in Switzerland, but remained in England after Germany annexed Austria. She was brought up as part of the family of Dr. Hans Hock, merchant banker and partner in Singer and Friedlander, London, and his wife, Johanna ("Hansi"), to whom she referred throughout her life as "Mummy" and "Daddy". She joined the school at its new base at Onslow Hall in Shropshire. She was classed as an enemy alien in 1940. She became a driver in the ATS after leaving school in 1942.

She married Lieutenant Commander John Langford-Holt in 1943. She assisted with his successful campaign to be elected as Conservative MP for Shrewsbury in the 1945 general election. She was presented at court in 1947. The couple were divorced in 1951.

She remarried, to Major Robert Rivers-Bulkeley, shortly after he retired from the Scots Guards. They farmed pigs in the Scottish Borders for five years before selling up in 1956. The couple moved to London, where her husband became an underwriter at Lloyd's of London.

== Business career ==
Rivers-Bulkeley joined the stock exchange firm of Hedderwick, Borthwick & Co in October 1957. She became a successful stockbroker, and also wrote columns of investment and financial management for women for The Daily Telegraph, undertook lecture tours, and appeared Woman's Hour on BBC Radio 4 and The Money Programme on BBC television. The couple kept a house on the French Riviera, at Tourrettes-sur-Loup. She was a founder member of Annabel's nightclub in 1962.

After spending some time on Wall Street with W. E. Hutton & Co., she was elected as a registered representative of the New York Stock Exchange in 1969. After several unsuccessful applications, she was one of the first ten women to be elected as a member of the London Stock Exchange on 26 March 1973. By that time, she was a partner with the brokerage firm of Capel-Cure, Garden & Co. Previously, the London Stock Exchange had turned down applications by women, on account of its lack of "facilities" for women members. The exchange also objected to Rivers-Bulkeley's foreign roots, and the risky nature of her husband's occupation. The policy was changed after the London Stock Exchange merged with the Birmingham Stock Exchange and several other regional British stock exchanges, some of which already had female members.

== Later life ==
In retirement, she moved to Scotland with her husband, living in the grounds of Gosford House, near Aberlady in East Lothian.

Diagnosed with a terminal illness when aged 82, she chose to attend the Dignitas clinic in Switzerland, which assisted her to commit suicide by drinking a lethal mixture of barbiturates. She had no children, and was survived by her husband.
