= Robert Grafton =

English politician

Robert Grafton (fl. 1386–1390), of Shrewsbury, Shropshire, was an English politician.

== Family ==
Grafton's family originated from Grafton, a hamlet near Shrewsbury. His wife was Benedicta, and they had three sons.

== Career ==
He was a Member (MP) of the Parliament of England for Shrewsbury in 1386, September 1388 and January 1390.

Parliament of England
Preceded by ? ?	Member of Parliament for Shrewsbury; 1386; With: Hugh Wigan	Succeeded by Hugh Wigan; Robert Thornes
Parliament of England
Preceded by Hugh Wigan; Robert Thornes	Member of Parliament for Shrewsbury; September 1388; With: Hugh Wigan	Succeeded by Robert Grafton; Thomas Pride
Parliament of England
Preceded by Hugh Wigan; Robert Grafton	Member of Parliament for Shrewsbury; January 1390; With: Thomas Pride	
