= Robert Dudley =

Robert Dudley is the name of:

== Surname ==
- Robert Dudley (actor) (1869–1955), American dentist and film character actor
- Robert Dudley (explorer) (1574–1649), illegitimate son of the 1st Earl of Leicester
- Robert Charles Dudley (1826–1909) watercolours and lithographs
- Bob Dudley (born 1955), former president & CEO of TNK-BP (2003–08) and group CEO of BP (2010–20)
- Robert Dudley, 1st Earl of Leicester (1532–1588), favourite of Queen Elizabeth I of England
- Robert Dudley alias Sutton (died 1539), English politician
- Robert H. Dudley (1933–2023), Justice of the Arkansas Supreme Court

== Middle name ==
- Robert Dudley Baxter (1827–1875), English economist
- Robert Dudley Edwards (1909–1988), Irish historian
