= Thomas Lyster =

Thomas Lyster may refer to:

- Thomas Lister (regicide) (1597–1668), or Lyster, colonel in the Parliamentary army during the English Civil War and an MP
- Sir Thomas Lyster (Cavalier) (1612–1655), supported King Charles I during the English Civil War
- Thomas William Lyster (1855–1922), Irish librarian
