= Nicholas Purcell =

Nicholas Purcell may refer to:

- Nicholas Purcell of Loughmoe (1651–1722), Privy Councillor
- Nicholas Purcell (classicist), professor of ancient history
- Nicholas Purcell (MP) (died 1559), English politician
