= William Spurstow (merchant) =

English merchant and politician (d. 1644)

William Spurstow (died 1644) was an English merchant and politician who sat in the House of Commons from 1640 to 1644. He supported the Parliamentary cause in the English Civil War.

Spurstow was the son of a Shropshire shearman and became a freeman of Shrewsbury in 1597. He moved to London where he became a leading merchant. In 1606, he was largely responsible for a Bill in parliament which relieved Welsh cloth from the need to have a seal of content. He became a member of the Worshipful Company of Mercers and a director of the East India Company. In 1626, he was imprisoned for refusing to pay the forced loan. He was a member of the congregation of St Stephen Coleman Street, and the Massachusetts Bay Company two strongly puritan organisations which were opposed to Crown and Church between 1629 and 1640.

In November 1640, Spurstow was elected member of parliament for Shrewsbury in the Long Parliament. He served on the Committees for Scandalous Ministers, and the Committee for Plundered Ministers. He sat until his death in 1644.

Spurstow died a wealthy man with his cash alone amounting to over £5,000. He left charitable donations which included £300 to Shrewsbury to set poor up in work.

Parliament of England
| Preceded by Francis Newport; Thomas Owen | Member of Parliament for Shrewsbury; 1640–1644; With: Francis Newport, 1st Earl of Bradford | Succeeded by Thomas Hunt |
