= Thomas Knight (MP for Shrewsbury) =

16th-century English politician

Thomas Knight (by 1475 – 1518/1520) was an English politician.

He was a member (MP) of the parliament of England for Shrewsbury in 1510.
