= Thomas Gamel =

English politician

Thomas Gamel was an English politician. He sat as MP for Shrewsbury in 1393.
