= Arthur Duckworth =

British politician

George Arthur Victor Duckworth (3 January 1901 – 14 November 1986), known as Arthur Duckworth, was a British Conservative Party politician.

He was elected as the member of parliament (MP) for Shrewsbury at the 1929 general election. He was re-elected in 1931 and 1935, and held the seat until he retired from the House of Commons at the 1945 election.

In 1936, he won 7th place in the ballot for private member's bills, and proposed to bring forward a Medical and Surgical Appliances (Advertisement) Bill.

He announced in April 1945 that he would not stand again at the next election.

== Personal life ==
Duckworth married Alice Frances Hammond, a fifth-generation descendant of Cornelius Vanderbilt, in March 1927; they had three daughters. The couple were divorced in February 1942, on the grounds of his wife's adultery in New York; she married the American bandleader Benny Goodman the following month.

Parliament of the United Kingdom
Preceded by Viscount Sandon	Member of Parliament for Shrewsbury; 1929 – 1945	Succeeded by John Langford-Holt
