= Richard Aldescote =

English politician

Richard Aldescote (fl. 1380–1404) was an English politician. He sat as MP for Shrewsbury in 1395.

He also served as coroner of Shrewsbury from possibly 1384 till 1386, assessor in September 1392 till 1393, bailiff from 1394 till 1395 and 13 May 1399 till September 1400.

He was the son and heir of John Aldescote of Shrewsbury. Before 1378, he married Agnes, the widow of John Colle of Shrewsbury and possibly had two sons.
