= Thomas Owen (died 1661) =

English politician

Thomas Owen (circa 1580-May 1661) was an English politician who sat in the House of Commons between 1624 and 1640. He supported the Royalist cause in the English Civil War.

Owen was the son of Edward Owen, a draper and alderman of Shrewsbury, who was loosely related to the Owen family of Condover Hall, and his wife Joanna, daughter of Richard Purcell. He entered Shrewsbury School in 1589. He is believed to have been the same Thomas Owen who was a law student at Lincoln's Inn in 1598 and was called to the bar in 1606. He became town clerk of Shrewsbury in or before January 1610. In 1624, Owen was elected Member of Parliament for Shrewsbury. He was re-elected in 1625 1626 and 1628 and sat until 1629 when King Charles I decided to rule without parliament for eleven years.

In April 1640, Owen was re-elected MP for Shrewsbury in the Short Parliament. He followed the royalist side in the Civil Wars, although he acted as a witness against Archbishop Laud. He acted as deputy to Sir Thomas Gardiner, Recorder of London, during the reign of Charles I and after Gardiner's death the King had given him an order for a grant of the office of Prothonotary of South Wales . The grant was never executed, and the order itself was destroyed by a fire in the lodgings of Sir Edward Herbert, the Attorney-General. He remained as town clerk of Shrewsbury until 1645, when the parliamentary forces captured the town. He was taken prisoner and dismissed from his position as town clerk as a delinquent on 17 November.

After the Restoration, Owen petitioned the King to grant him the office of Prothonotary of South Wales. He also petitioned to be restored to his post as town clerk. However the matter was referred to Lord Carberry who ruled in favour of a rival claimant.

Owen died in May 1661 and was buried at the old St Chad's Church, Shrewsbury, on 25 May.

Parliament of England
Preceded by Sir Richard Newport; Francis Berkeley	Member of Parliament for Shrewsbury; 1624–1629; With: Francis Berkeley 1624; Sir William Owen 1625–1629	Parliament suspended until 1640
Parliament suspended since 1629	Member of Parliament for Shrewsbury; 1640; With: Francis Newport	Succeeded by Francis Newport; William Spurstow
