= Francis Berkeley (Shrewsbury MP) =

English lawyer and politician

Francis Berkeley (c.1583/1628) was an English lawyer and politician who sat in the House of Commons between 1614 and 1624.

Berkeley was eldest son of Edmund Berkeley (d. 1609), draper of Shrewsbury and Hadnall and his first wife Mary, daughter and coheir of William Felton of Ewdnes, Worfield, Shropshire. He matriculated at Brasenose College, Oxford on 16 February 1599, aged 15, and again on 14 July 1602 when he was awarded BA the next day. He was admitted to Lincoln's Inn in 1605 and was called to the bar in 1612. In 1614, he was elected Member of Parliament for Shrewsbury. He was re-elected MP for Shrewsbury in 1621 and in 1624.

He married Anne (d. 1629), daughter of Thomas Purcell of Dinthill Hall, Bicton, Shropshire.

Parliament of England
Preceded by Richard Barker; Francis Tate	Member of Parliament for Shrewsbury; 1614–1624; With: Lewis Prowde 1614; Sir Richard Newport 1621–1622; Thomas Owen 1624	Succeeded by Sir William Owen; Thomas Owen
