= St Chad's Church, Shrewsbury =

Church in Shropshire, England

Coordinates: 52°42′26″N 2°45′32″W

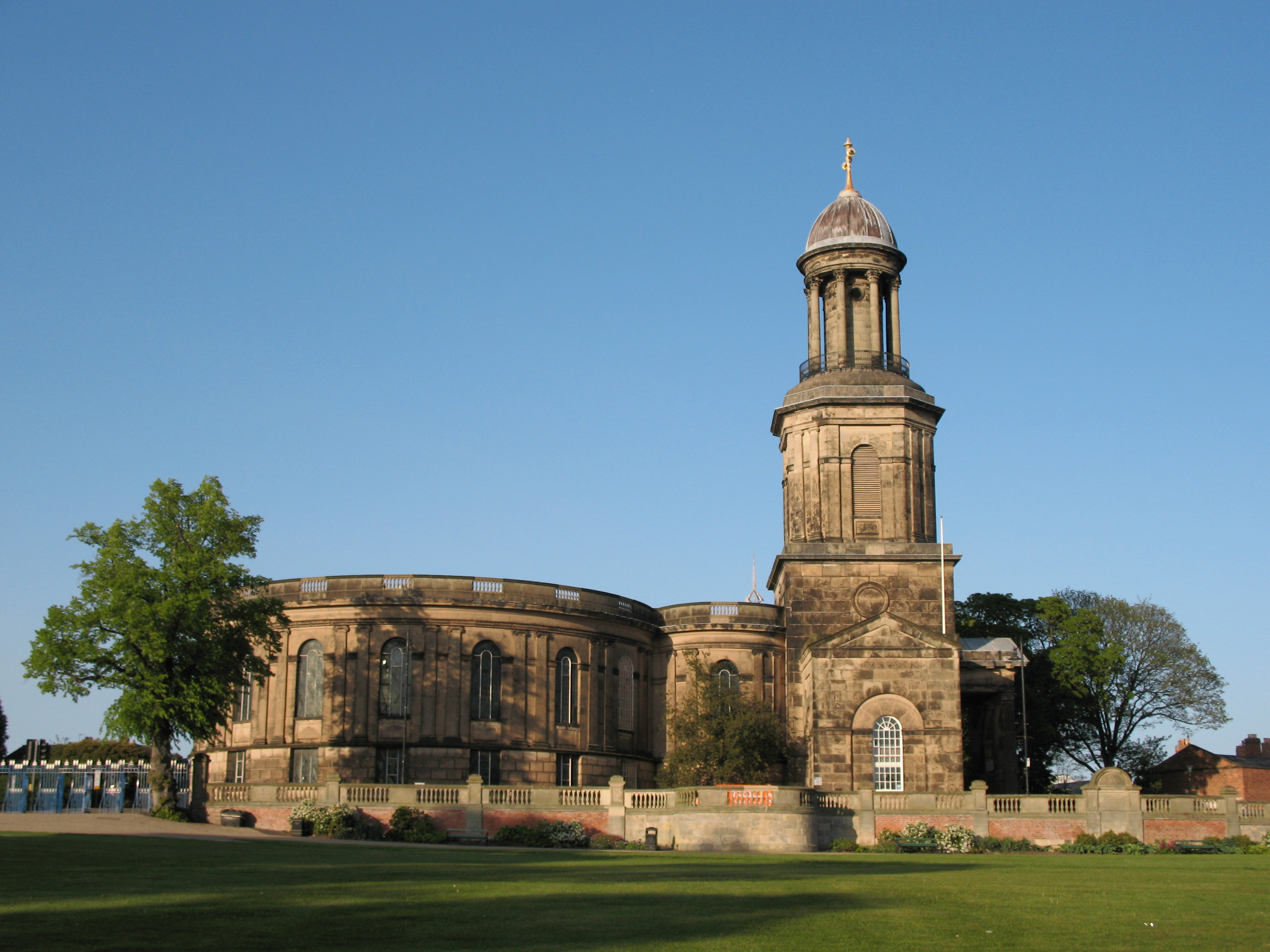
- The current building of St Chad's Church, Shrewsbury, seen from The Quarry
- St Chad's Church, Shrewsbury
- OS grid reference: SJ 48819 12431
- Location: St Chad's Terrace, Shrewsbury, SY1 1JX
- Country: England
- Denomination: Church of England
- Previous denomination: Roman Catholic Celtic Christianity
- Churchmanship: Liberal Catholic
- Website: www.stchadschurchshrewsbury.com

History
- Founded: c560
- Founder(s): ? Brochwel Ysgithrog;? King Offa

Architecture
- Heritage designation: Grade I
- Designated: 10 January 1953
- Architect: George Steuart
- Years built: 1792

Administration
- Diocese: Diocese of Lichfield

Clergy
- Vicar: Rev Samuel Mann

St Chad's Church in Shrewsbury is traditionally understood to have been founded in Saxon times. King Offa, who reigned in Mercia from 757 to 796 AD, is believed to have founded the church, though it is possible it has an earlier foundation even than that.

The church may have been operating on its initial site from buildings that were part of a royal palace established in the 500s AD, in the Kingdom of Powys, who had their capital at Shrewsbury, when it was known as Pengwern.

For a period of nearly 1000 years the church was at the original College Hill site, only moving to its current building and site in 1792.

The distinctive round shape and high tower of the new building is a well-known landmark in the town, near the Quarry area of parkland. The current building is a Grade I listed building.

The motto of the church is "open doors, open hearts, and open minds". This indicates the aspiration of the church to be a welcoming church, involved in the community, and on a collective journey seeking after God.

The naturalist Charles Darwin was baptised in St Chad's church in 1809, and as a young boy attended the church with his mother Susannah.

In 2010, the church became a member of the Greater Churches Group.

== History ==
=== Old St Chad's on the earlier site ===
The present building replaced an earlier church, dedicated to St Chad, situated near College Hill.

It was already a well endowed and ancient institution at the time of the Domesday Book of 1086. The ancient parish included the greater part of Shrewsbury within the walls, and it had a number of manors in Shropshire.

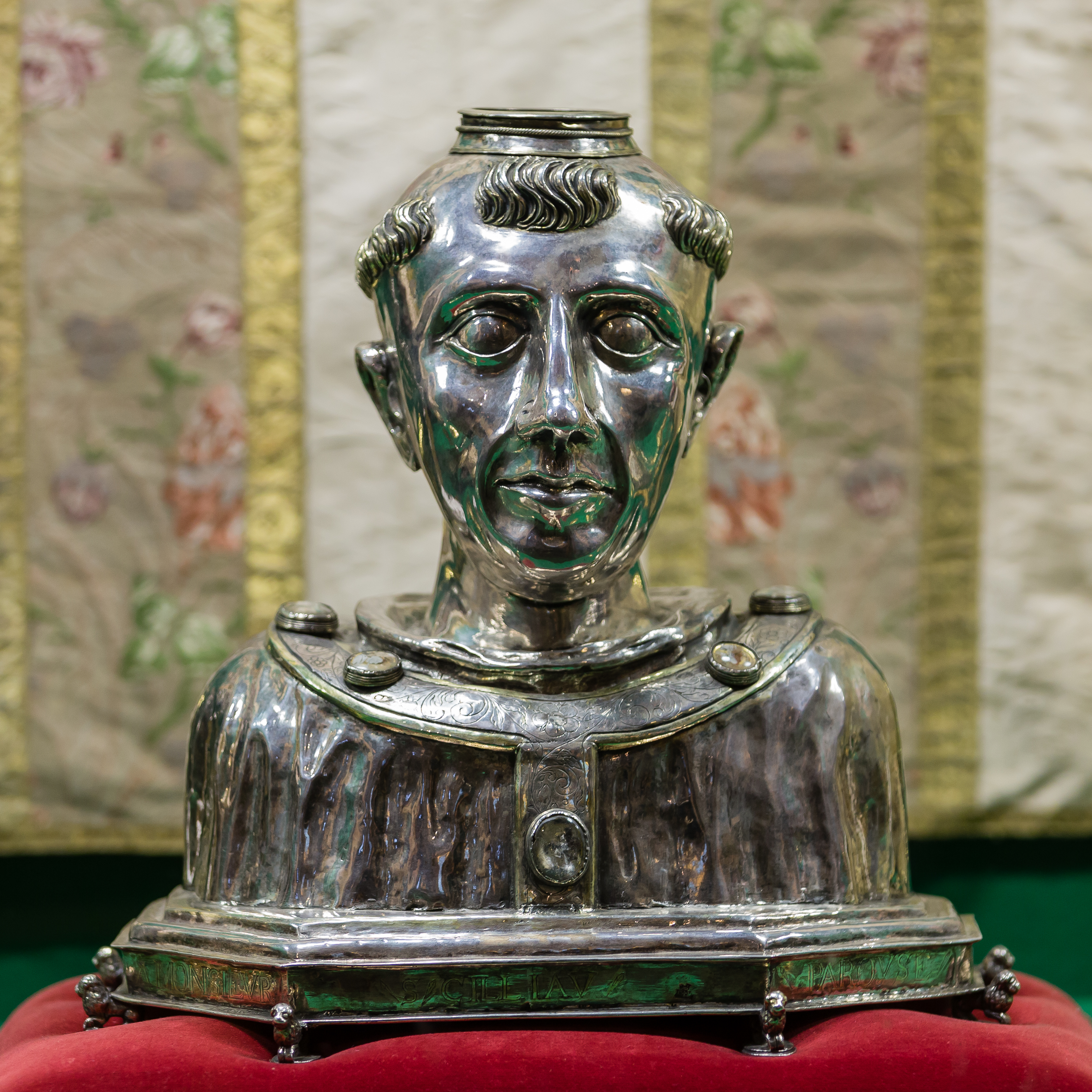
Representation of Saint Tysilio, a Welsh bishop, prince and scholar, son of the reigning King of Powys, and possible founder of the church of St Chad at Shrewsbury

Medieval Welsh literary evidence suggests that the bishops of Lichfield may have obtained possession of the endowments of a Celtic church at Shrewsbury. The earliest piece of Welsh evidence for this is the Lament for Cynddylan incorporated in the poems of Llywarch Hen, which date in their written form to c. 850. The Historia Monacellae identifies Pengwern with Shrewsbury, puts the palace of Brochwel Ysgithrog, Prince of Powys, on the site of the College of St. Chad, and records a tradition that Brochwel granted his estates to pious uses. Another Welsh source attributes the foundation of the church of Pengwern to Brochwel's son Tysilio.

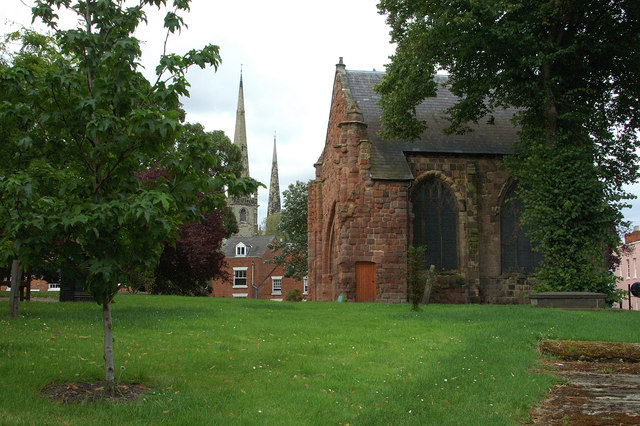
The only surviving part of Old St Chad's at Shrewsbury

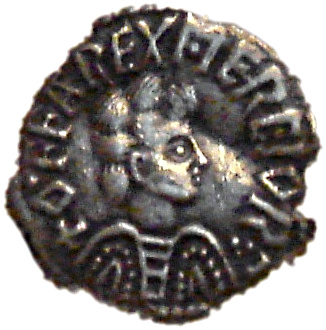
Offa king of Mercia is held by some traditions to have established the church's foundation

The collegiate establishment of St. Chad consisted of a dean, ten secular canons, and two vicars choral, and was founded soon after the subjugation of Pengwern, in the 8th century, by Offa, king of Mercia, who, as tradition states, converted the palace of the kings of Powis into his first church. It is not improbable that the precinct originally extended as far west as Swan Hill, and include College Court on College Hill.

There is a crypt or baptistry partly exposed within the site, which was excavated in 1889. The reports from that time say this work was "undoubtedly Saxon...[placing reliance upon among other things] the slender pillars were worked with the axe; and... other things peculiar to early Saxon work"; there are remaining pillar bases in the floor. The current Historic Environment Record for this scheduled feature says it is "[c]urrently in a disgraceful condition".

Remains of the college of St Chad can be traced in the land adjoining the south-western extremity of the church on the old site, with portions of the wall traceable to a considerable distance in the neighbouring gardens. It is possible that, in Clive House, in the drawing room an alcove with an inset oak framework, remains of the buttery of St Chad's College survive in situ. More structural fabric may remain in a small section of medieval worked and coursed sandstone towards the southeast end of the east wall of No 1 College Court, and the remains of at least three timber buildings have been identified within No 3 College Court.

There was a "Great Fire of Shrewsbury" in 1394 and the St Chad's Church building extant at that time was consumed in that event; the damage was so considerable that King Richard II remitted the town's taxes for three years towards the repairs.

In 1407, William Thorpe, a priest, came to the town and at St. Chad's church condemned important tenets of the Catholic Church. Thorpe was in consequence thrown into prison. He was later taken to Lambeth Palace, and subsequently complained about by "the bailives and worshipful cominalte". He admitted the charges laid against him. What happened to him then is not recorded.

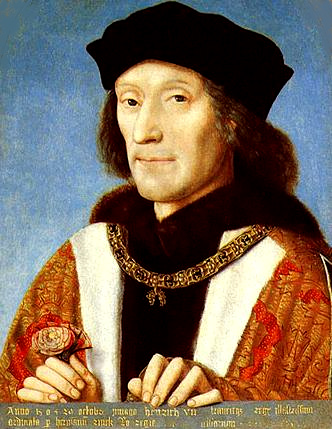
Henry VII worshipped at the church in state

Henry VII visited Shrewsbury in 1490, and observed the feast of St. George in the collegiate church of St. Chad, along with his queen and Prince Arthur. The party:

proceeding from the Guild Hall with a great company was stalled upon the right side of the chancel near unto the Queen's Majesty's place prepared in the choir

The old church contained an altar to St Michael, of which the Mercers were patrons, and they came to have a hall in the complex's Sextry.

The college was closed by the time of the dissolution of the monasteries.

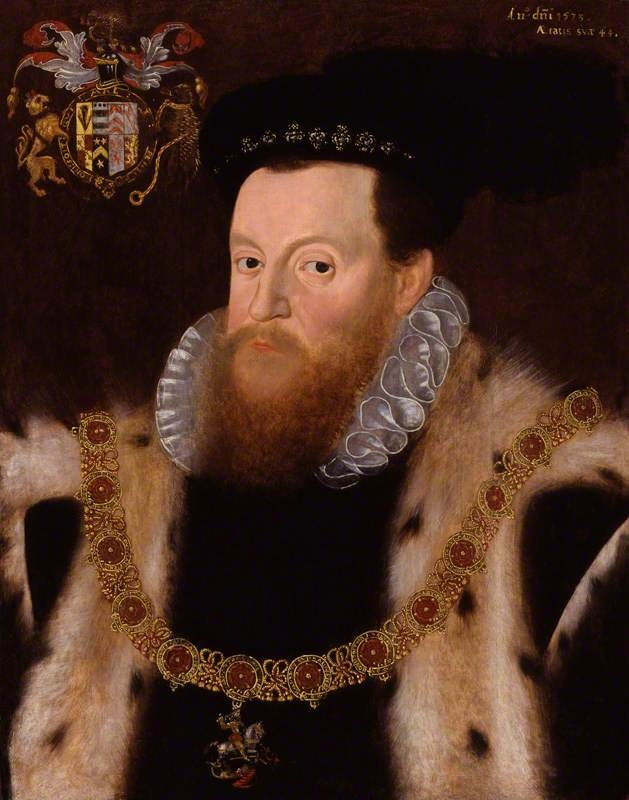
Henry Sidney held a civic service at the church on the old site reminiscent of a Garter Service

In 1581, Sir Henry Sidney, celebrated the feast of St. George, in Old St Chads on 23 April, with great splendour: a solemn procession went from the Council House to St. Chad's Church, the choir of which was fitted up in imitation of St. George's Chapel, Windsor, and the stalls decorated with the arms of the Knights of the Garter.

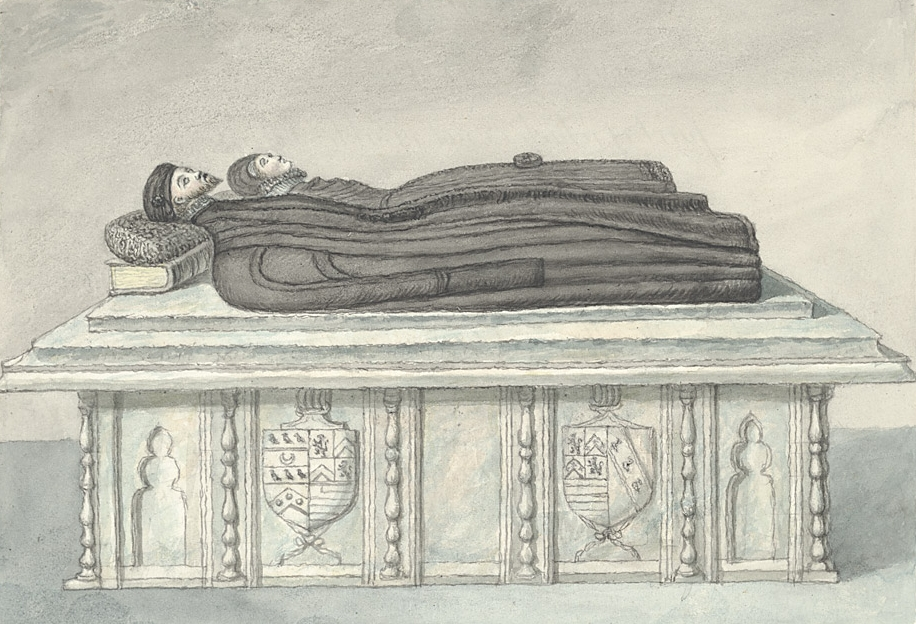
Monument of Richard Onslow in old St. Chad's Church: one of many lost monuments from the destruction of Old St Chads. It was moved to Shrewsbury Abbey Church

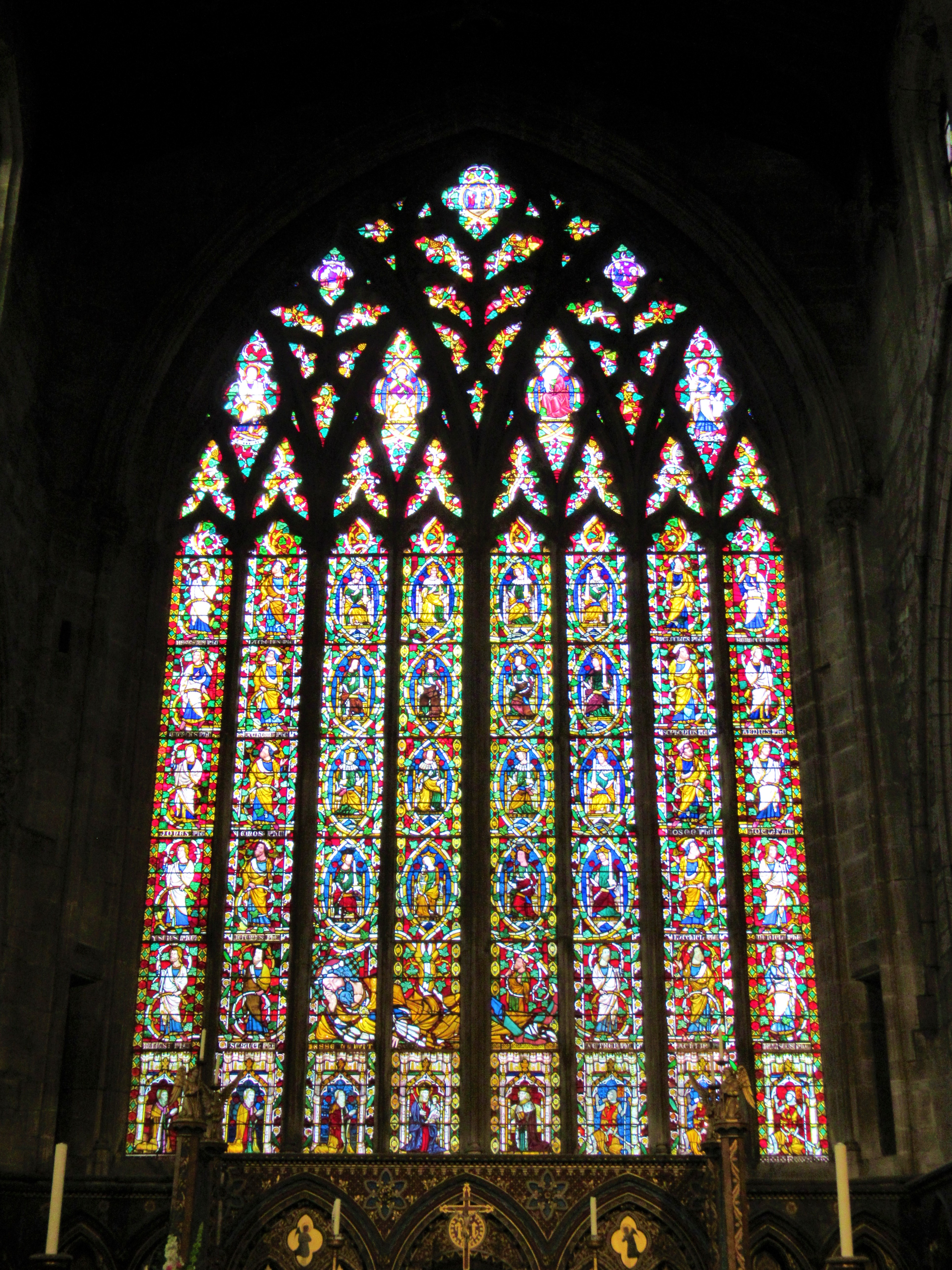
Jesse Window now in St Mary's Shrewsbury; moved from Old St Chads. The lost building is said to have resembled St Mary's, but been slightly bigger

The lost building contained the monument to John Weaver, father of English ballet and pantomime. It also had a peal of ten bells, and on the south was the church-yard, which owing to the " accumulated remains of successive generations, during more than eleven centuries, had been raised to the level of the window sills," making the Church damp. This crypt was the oldest portion of the building, with the lower portion of the walls rudely built and possibly dating from the 9th century. By tradition, the Jesse window that is now in St. Mary's Church, Shrewsbury was put in Old St Chad's at the Dissolution, having been allegedly made for the Franciscan church in Shrewsbury.

The building on the previous site was largely destroyed when the central tower collapsed in 1788 after attempts to expand the crypt compromised the structural integrity of the tower above it. What existed of the building when this collapse happened was a largely 13th-century building. All that remains of the earlier building is a side chapel surrounded by a disused churchyard which also contains the exposed crypt.

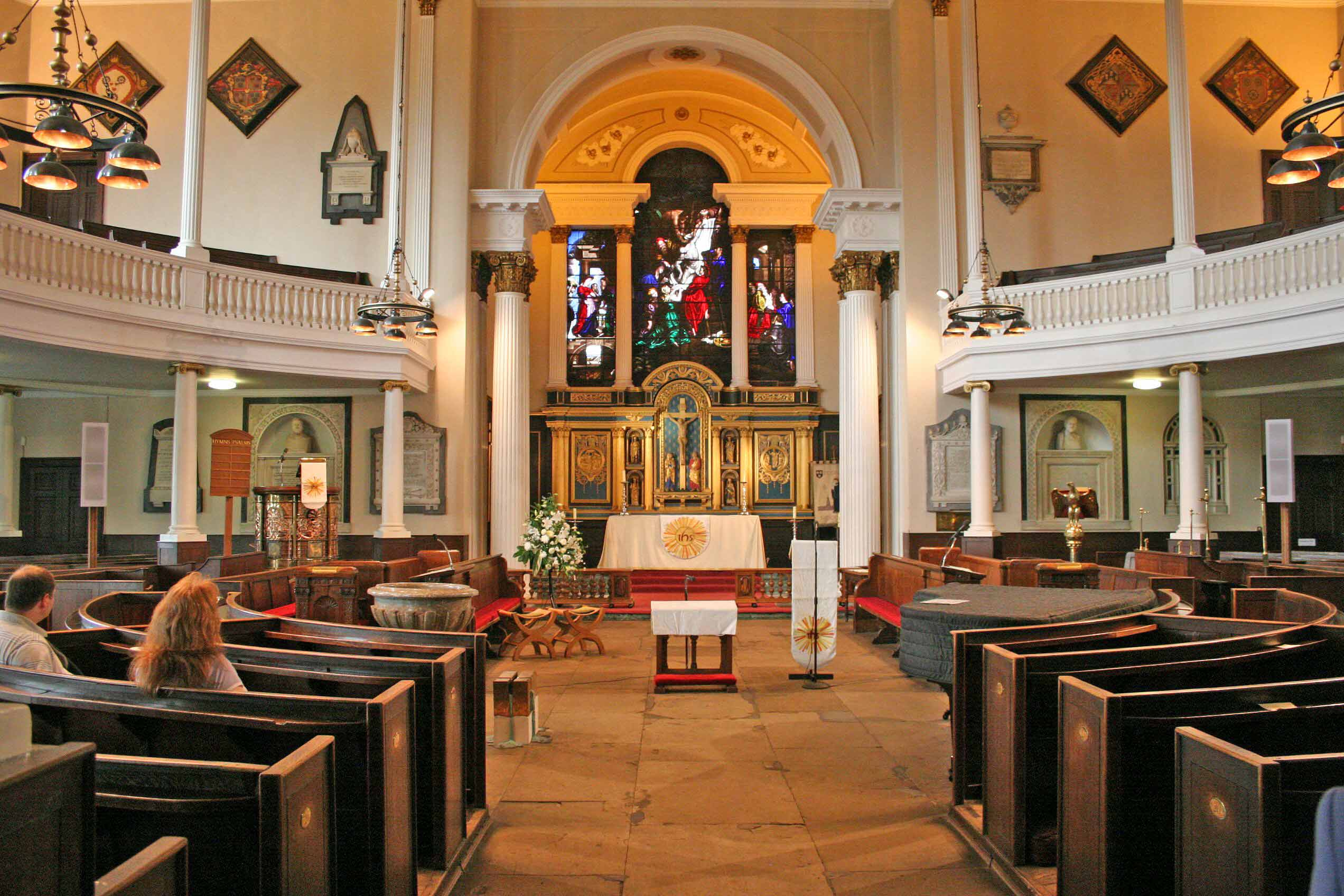
Inside St Chad's Church, looking towards the sanctuary

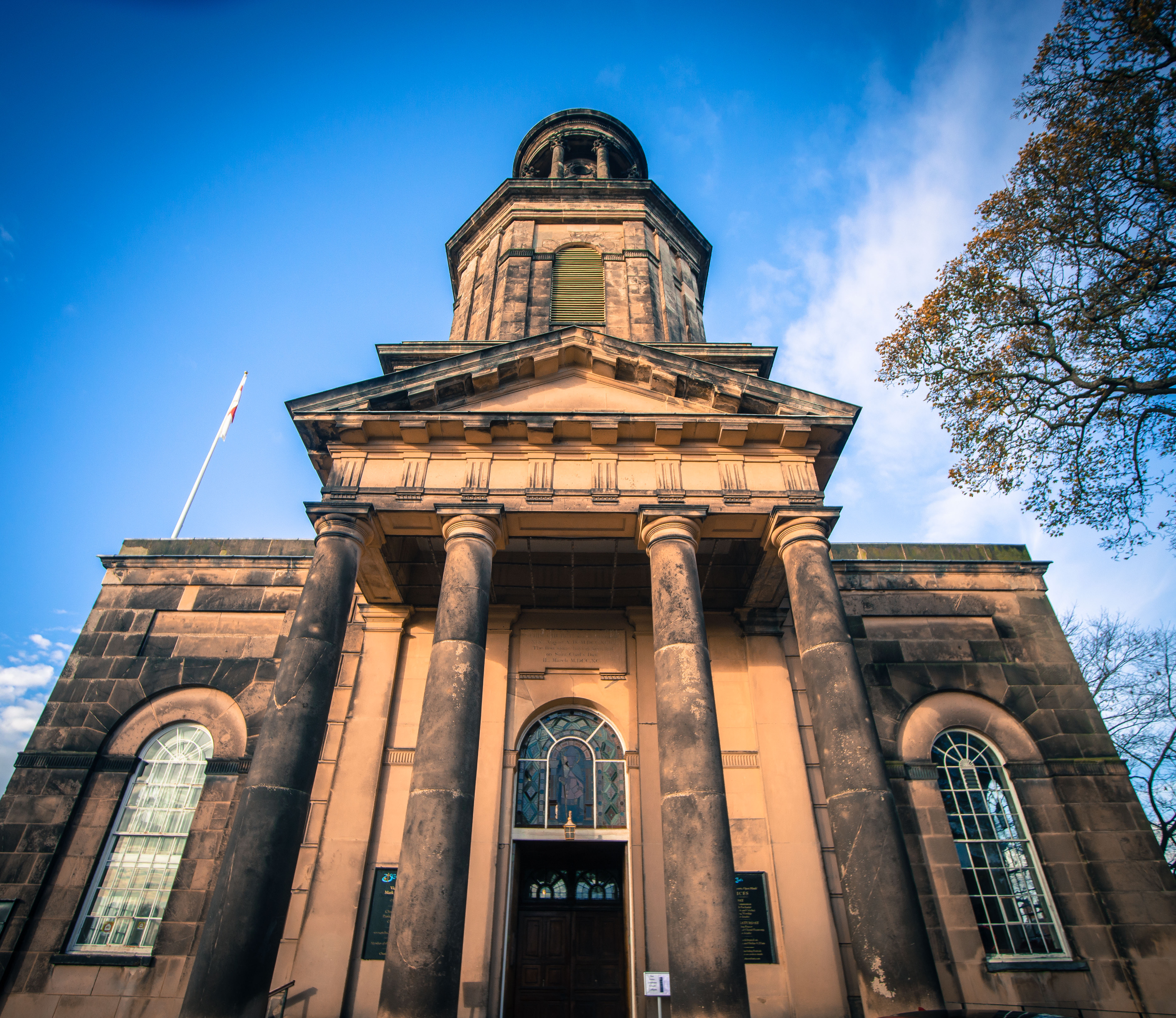
Palladian-style entrance to the church

Notable people buried at the old church include:

- Rowland Lee (died 1543), Bishop of Coventry and Lichfield
- Richard Onslow (died 1571), lawyer and politician, ultimately Solicitor General
- Richard Mytton (died 1591), politician
- Robert Ireland (died 1599), politician
- Sir Thomas Lyster (died 1655), Royalist Colonel in English Civil War
- Thomas Mytton (died 1656), politician and Parliamentary Major-General in English Civil War
- Thomas Owen (died 1661), Royalist politician
- John Weaver (died 1760), dancing master, father of pantomime
- Job Orton (died 1783), English dissenting minister

=== The current church building ===
Scottish architect George Steuart was commissioned to build a new church. He submitted four design proposals, three of which followed a circular plan. Round or oval churches were briefly in vogue during the latter decades of the 18th century, due to the influence of French neo-classicism. Steuart "strenuously recommended" one of his round designs in particular, but the local planning committee insisted on an oblong church.

This having been decided, the committee's next task was to find a site for the new church, and Steuart was asked to provide a sketch of his design to help fix the location. He provided a sketch of a round church, a fact which went unnoticed or unmentioned by the committee. After a site had been chosen in the Quarry, Steuart submitted his working drawings, which also exhibited a round design. When the committee objected, he told them that he had assumed from their silence that they approved of the plan, and that he required to be paid for the work done before he would submit a new set of drawings. By this time, the planning process had been so hampered by argument and delay that the committee thought it preferable to simply go ahead with the round design.

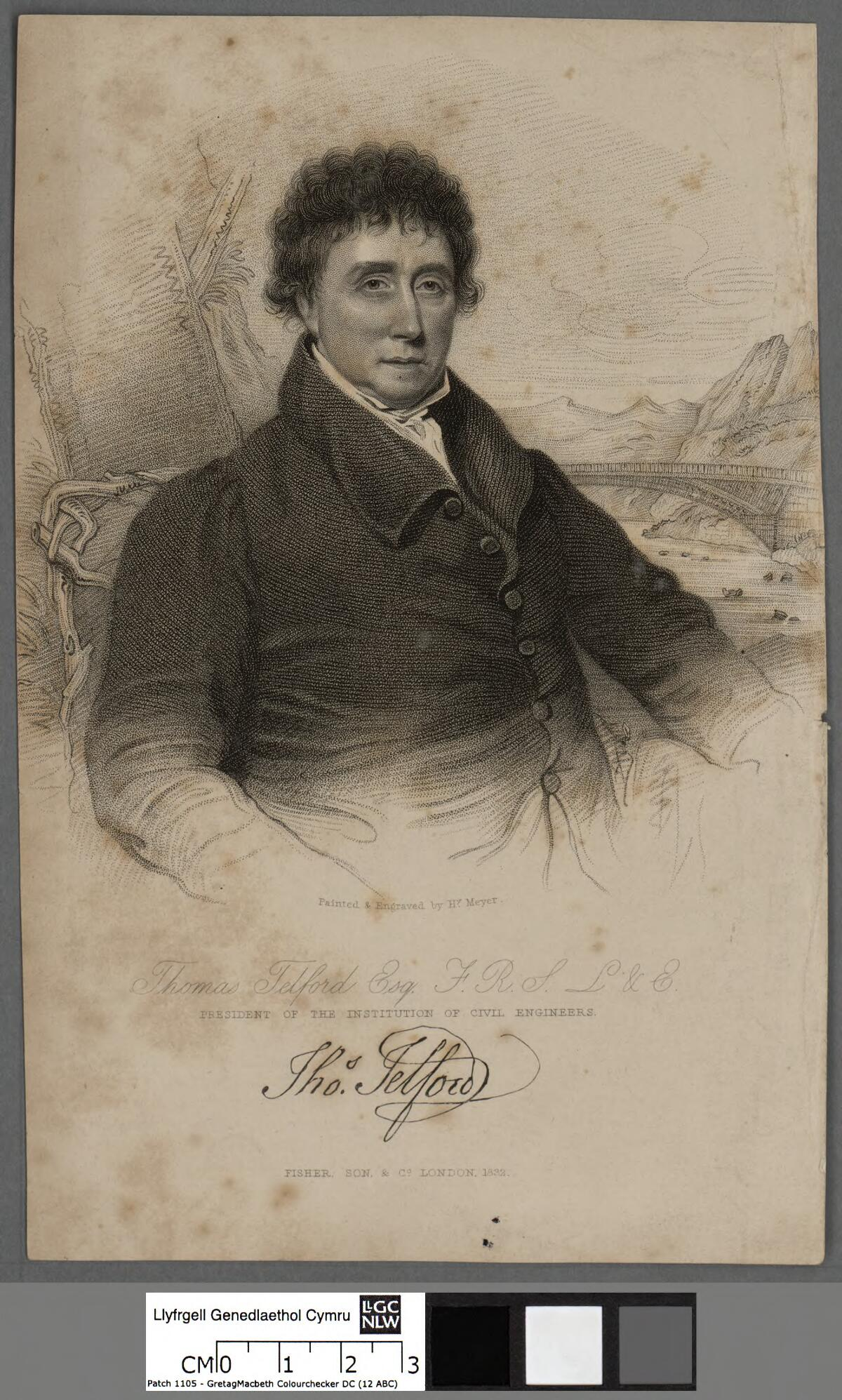
Thomas Telford oversaw construction of the new church

The foundation stone was laid on St Chad's day, 2 March 1790. The church was built of white Grinshill stone. The building work was supervised by John Simpson (who later worked on several projects with Thomas Telford, including the Pontcysyllte Aqueduct). Internally, the gallery was supported by slender cast iron pillars, an early example of cast iron used for this purpose; they were made by William Hazledine, a pioneering ironmaster who had a foundry in Shrewsbury. (There are memorials to Simpson and Hazledine on either side of the sanctuary arch of the church.)

The church was opened on 19 August 1792. Charles Darwin was baptised at the church on 15 November 1809.

The sanctuary window is a copy in stained glass of a triptych by Rubens in Antwerp Cathedral; it was made in the 1840s by David Evans, a local stained glass artist. The original pulpit, which obscured the altar, was removed in 1888; it was replaced by a copper and brass pulpit in Arts and Crafts style, placed to one side and giving a clearer view of the Sanctuary.

The entrance hall has many memorials relating to the 53rd Regiment of Foot, and its successor regiment the King's Shropshire Light Infantry (KSLI) including:

- alabaster tablet memorial to officers and men of the 53rd who died at the Battle of Sobraon (1846);
- large tablet to those of that regiment who died in the Indian Mutiny campaign (1857–59);
- tablet to those of the 1st Battalion KSLI who died in the Egyptian campaign of 1882;
- tablet to those of the 1st KSLI who died in the occupation of Suakim, Sudan, 1885–86;
- tablet above vestibule entrance to KSLI dead (4,700 all ranks) of the First World War, unveiled 1930 in presence of Poet Laureate John Masefield; and
- books of remembrance of KSLI war dead of both World Wars, in separate cases, in addition to separate county books of remembrance to all war dead from the county of Shropshire.

In 1913, a vestry off the right hand side of the entrance lobby was converted to a chapel of St Aidan, in memory of former vicar Richard Eden St Aubyn Arkwright. In 1951, at about the same time as a second storey was added to another vestry on the opposite side of the lobby, funds were raised to convert this chapel into a regimental chapel for the KSLI, resulting in an enlarged apse, new altar, rood screen, rails and chairs. In 1952 and 1966, Regimental colours were laid up here.

After the First World War, the church's main sanctuary was refitted with a light oak reredos, designed by Cecil Lightwood Hare, new altar and wainscot as a memorial to the parish fallen of the war, repainted in gold leaf and cobalt in 1951.

== Churchyard ==
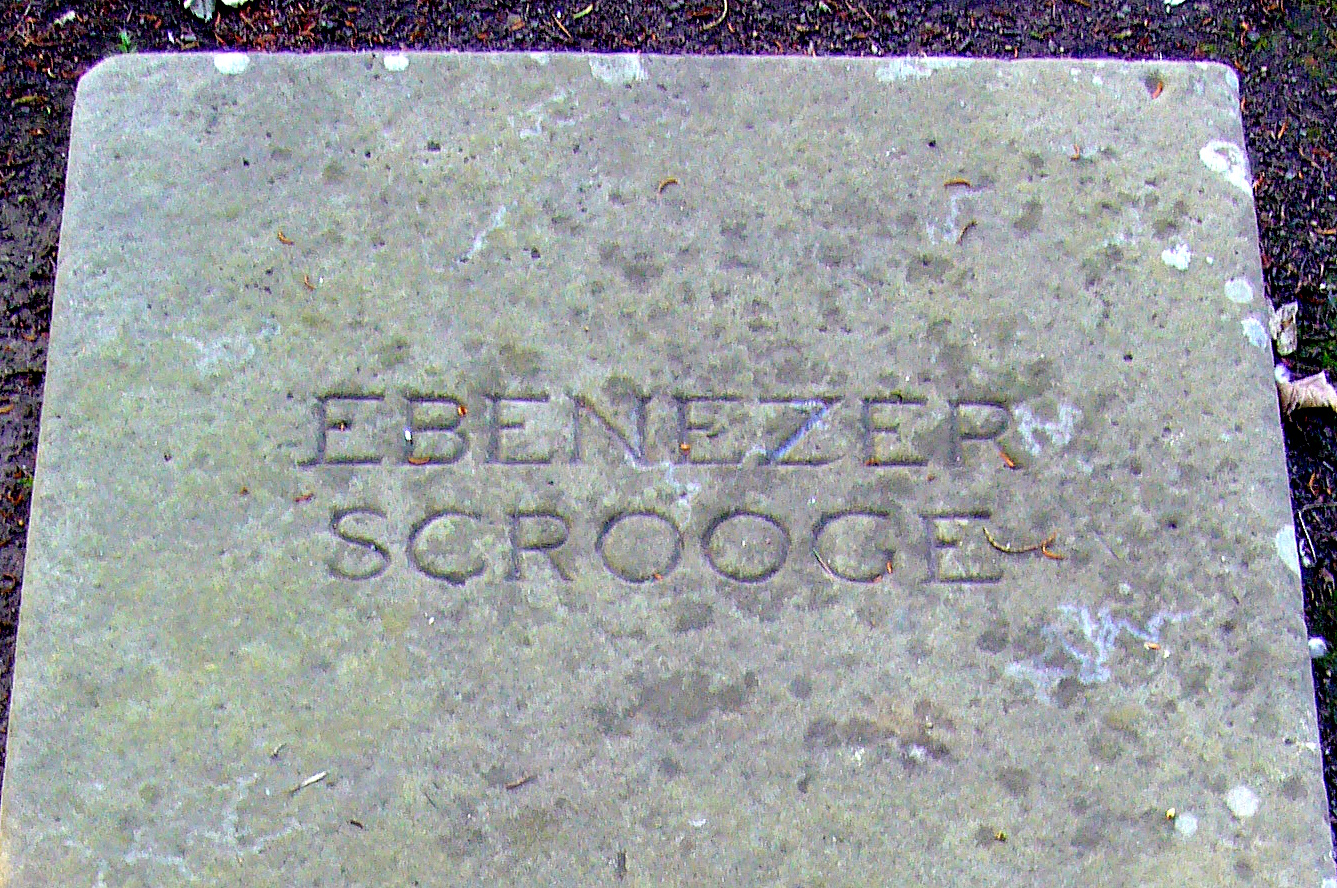
'Grave' of Ebenezer Scrooge in the churchyard, a prop from the 1984 film A Christmas Carol which was kept in situ after filming was completed

Still present in the now-disused churchyard is the headstone prop of Ebenezer Scrooge (played by George C. Scott) that was used in the 1984 film A Christmas Carol for the scene where Scrooge finds his own grave. According to the Shrewsbury Town Crier, Martin Wood, the headstone is not a "prop" but an actual period headstone, on which the original inscription had deteriorated to the point that the production asked the church if they could use it and inscribe the "Ebenezer Scrooge" words on it. Some of the original inscription can still be seen on the bottom part of the stone. The stone was damaged by vandals in 2024; local stonemasons repaired the stone for free "in the spirit of the film."

Among those actually buried in the churchyard were Shrewsbury architect Edward Haycock, Sr. and ironmaster William Hazledine.

== Music ==
Music is a strong tradition at St Chad's. The church has a robed choir which leads the music at many of the services. The church organ is a large three-manual pipe organ, built by Norman and Beard in 1904 and restored by Nicholson & Co Ltd in 1963 and Harrison & Harrison in 1985 and more recently in 2011. The church hosts lunchtime organ recitals and other concerts.

== Notable clergy ==
- Sir Lovelace Stamer, 3rd Baronet, Vicar 1892–96, also Anglican Bishop of Shrewsbury 1888–1906
- Charles Bulmer Maude, Vicar 1896–1906, also Archdeacon of Salop 1896–1917
- William Alonzo Parker, Vicar 1942–45, later Anglican Bishop of Shrewsbury 1959–70
- William Johnston, Vicar, later Bishop of Dunwich 1977–80
- Christopher Spafford, Vicar 1969 - 76, later Provost of Newcastle 1976 - 1989.
- Robert Willis, Curate 1972–75, later Dean of Canterbury

== See also ==
- Grade I listed churches in Shropshire
- Listed buildings in Shrewsbury (northwest central area)
