= John Langford-Holt =

British politician (1916–1993)

Sir John Anthony Langford-Holt (30 June 1916 – 23 July 1993) was a British Conservative Member of Parliament for Shrewsbury from 1945 to 1983.

== Biography ==
He was born in Studdale, Waldershare, Kent on 30 June 1916, son of Ernest and Christine Langford-Holt, and like most of his family educated at Shrewsbury School; his grandfather, George Jones Holt, had served as the Mayor of Shrewsbury. During the Second World War, he was a pilot, first in the Battle of Britain and later with the Fleet Air Arm.

During his political career, his positions included serving on the Parliamentary Science Committee, the Estimates Committee, the Expenditure Committee and the Select Committee, on Defence. During Churchill's later years, he was entrusted by the Tory Whips to look after Churchill himself. He was knighted in 1962.

He was married four times, firstly to Elisabeth Neustadtl in 1943. The couple were divorced in 1951, and she married Major Robert Rivers-Bulkeley. In 1953, he married Flora Innes Stuart, daughter of Ian St Clair Stuart, but was dissolved in 1969, after which he married Maxine Veale in 1971. After the couple divorced in 1982, he married for the last time to Irene Kerr. He died in London on 23 July 1993, aged 77.

Parliament of the United Kingdom
Preceded by Arthur Duckworth	Member of Parliament for Shrewsbury; 1945 – 1983	Constituency abolished
