= John Beget =

English politician

John Beget (fl. 1410–1430) was an English politician. He sat as MP for Shrewsbury in March 1416.

He also served as assessor for Shrewsbury from September 1410 till 1411, 1419 till 1420, 1424 till 1425 and 1429 till 1430; and tax collector for Shrewsbury in December 1414 and November 1415.

He was the son of John Beget of London. Before July 1417, he married Benedicta and possibly had three sons.
