= 1870 Shrewsbury by-election =

UK Parliamentary by-election

The 1870 Shrewsbury by-election was fought on 21 September 1870. The by-election was fought due to the Death of the incumbent MP of the Liberal Party, William James Clement. It was won by the Conservative candidate Douglas Straight.
