= Henry David Greene =

British barrister and politician (1843–1915)

Henry David Greene, KC, JP, DL (1843 – 11 October 1915) was a British barrister and Conservative Party politician.

The son of Benjamin Buck Greene, a governor of the Bank of England, Greene was educated at Trinity College, Cambridge (MA, LLM) and was called to the bar at the Middle Temple in 1868. He practised in London and on the Oxford Circuit, and took silk in 1885.

He was elected to the House of Commons as a Conservative for Shrewsbury in 1892, and was returned unopposed in 1895 and 1900. When his son Rowland Henry Blyth Greene (b.1881) was diagnosed as an "imbecile", his father Henry sought membership of the Royal Commission on the Feeble-Minded and was appointed an unpaid Commissioner in Lunacy from 1908 to 1914. He was Treasurer of the Middle Temple in 1910.
