= Richard Barker (MP) =

English politician

Richard Barker (c. 1554 – 1636), was an English politician.

He was a member (MP) of the parliament of England for Shrewsbury in 1584 and 1604.
