= Thomas Berwick (MP) =

English politician

Thomas Berwick (fl. 1372–1401) was an English politician. He sat as MP for Shrewsbury in 1399.

He also served as tax collector of Shropshire in November 1377; and assessor in Shropshire in May 1379.

He married a woman and had one son who predeceased him.
