= Thomas Lyster (Cavalier) =

English Royalist (1612–1655)

Sir Thomas Lyster
- Born: 1612
- Died: March 17, 1655 (aged 42–43)
- Occupations: Royalist supporter; landowner
- Known for: Supporter of King Charles I during the English Civil War

Sir Thomas Lyster of Rowton Castle (1612–1655), supported King Charles I during the English Civil War.

== Life ==
Thomas Lyster of Rowton was eleven years of age in 1623, according to the visitations. He was a devoted adherent of King Charles I. During the first campaign of the English Civil War, when Charles I arrived in Shrewsbury he presented 500 pieces of gold to help pay for the war. He was knighted for this act of loyalty.

In 1642 he signed a joint engagement with other gentlemen of the county to help raise a regiment of dragoons. He was given a high command in the garrison established in Shrewsbury, and on the fall of the town he was taken prisoner, but his wife may have gallantly held Rowton Castle for nearly a fortnight against all the efforts of the parliamentary officer, Colonel Thomas Mytton and did not surrender until she had obtained good terms from Mytton .

Sir Thomas died in 1655. He was buried at the Old St Chad's Church, Shrewsbury, on 17 March, and was succeeded by his son Richard.

== Family ==
Sir Thomas was first married to Elizabeth, daughter of John Adye, of the county of Kent, and had by her one son, Richard, his heir, and one daughter, Elizabeth, the wife of — Draycott, of Ireland. He married secondly, Mary, daughter of Sir Sir John Hanmer, 1st Baronet, by whom he had a son, Thomas, barrister-at-law, who d. unmarried, and two daughters, Dorothy, the wife of William Jordan, esq. and Mary, who died unmarried.
