= John Perle (died 1429) =

English politician

John Perle (died 1428/29), of Shrewsbury, Shropshire, was an English politician.

Perle was a member (MP) of the parliament of England for Shrewsbury in 1406, 1422 and 1423.
