= Adam Mytton =

16th-century English politician

Sir Adam Mytton (born before 1498 – 1561) was an English member of parliament and county sheriff.

He was born the son of Thomas Mytton of Shrewsbury, Shropshire. He inherited the family home and control of the family clothing business and became a member of the Shropshire Drapers' Company. He became very active in local administration in the county as a coroner, auditor, bailiff, alderman and steward. In 1523 he was elected member of parliament for Shrewsbury and was re-elected in 1529, 1536 and 1542.

In 1532 he was appointed escheator for Shropshire and a J.P. for several local counties. In 1543 he was also appointed to the Council of the Marches for life and knighted in 1547. He served as Sheriff of Radnorshire for 1546 – 47 and 1552–53 and Sheriff of Shropshire for 1553–54

He died in 1561. He had married twice: firstly Alice, the daughter of Mr Bowdler and widow of Thomas Withyford, and with whom he had two daughters and secondly Catherine. He bequeathed his property to his nephew Richard Mytton, who had also been an MP and sheriff.
