= Edward Hosier =

16th-century English politician

Edward Hosier (by 1506 – 7 April 1571) was an English politician.

He was a Member (MP) in the House of Commons of the Parliament of England for Shrewsbury for a single two-year term starting in 1545. He was born into a family of drapers, and apprenticed and served in this profession for many years. The year before his single term in Parliament, he bought the manor at Preston Gubbels from the Crown, and passed this down to his daughter, Elizabeth upon his death.
