= Hugh Wigan =

English politician

Hugh Wigan (fl. 1386–1407), of Shrewsbury and Hereford, was an English politician.

He was a Member (MP) of the Parliament of England for Shrewsbury in 1386, February 1388, September 1388, 1391, 1394, 1395, January 1397, September 1397, and for Hereford in 1401, 1406 and 1407.
