= Robert Dudley alias Sutton =

16th-century English politician

Robert Dudley alias Sutton (1471/1472 – 1539), was an English politician.

He was a member (MP) of the parliament of England for Shrewsbury in 1529 and 1536.
