= Richard Mytton =

16th-century English politician

Richard Mytton (1500/1501–1591) was an English politician.

== Biography ==
Mytton was the son of William Mytton, of Shrewsbury, and Cecily, the daughter of Henry Delves of Doddington. The Myttons were an influential family in the locality. His father died in 1513, when Richard Mytton was twelve or thirteen years old. It is thought he became a ward of the 10th Earl of Arundel.

He was a member of the Inner Temple.

He was Member of Parliament for Devizes in 1529; Shropshire in 1539, 1545, March 1553, October 1553 and November 1554; and MP for Shrewsbury in 1542 and April 1554. He was appointed High Sheriff of Shropshire for 1543–44 and 1559–60 and High Sheriff of Merionethshire for 1546–47 and 1553–54.

He was married three times, in 1517 a settlement was arranged to Anne, daughter of Edward Grey of Enville; to a daughter of Jenkin Piggott of Rhuddlan; and to Eleanor, daughter of George Harborne and widow of Richard Beeston of Shrewsbury, who survived Mytton to die in 1602 aged 90.

He died on 26 November 1591, aged 90, and was buried at Old St Chad's Church, Shrewsbury. He outlived his eldest son and grandson, and was succeeded by his great-grandson, also called Richard. His uncle, Adam Mytton, was also an MP for Shrewsbury.

== See also ==
- Halston Hall
