= Robert Ireland (died 1599) =

English politician

Robert Ireland (c. 1532 – 6 October 1599) was an English politician.

He was a member (MP) of the parliament of England for Shrewsbury in 1559, 1563 and 1571.

He lived in Shrewsbury High Street in the timber-framed house called Ireland's Mansion that he built himself. He died in 1599 and was buried at St Chad's Church, Shrewsbury.
