= George Leigh =

16th-century English politician

George Leigh or Lye (by 1530 – 1578) was an English politician.

== Life ==
He was a member (MP) of the Parliament of England for Shrewsbury in March 1553, November 1554, 1558, 1559, 1571 and 1572, and for Ripon in 1563.

Leigh was a merchant in Shrewsbury, and had served in local politics, becoming a burgess (or common council man) in 1555, an alderman in 1565, and served as bailiff of the borough in 1564–65, 1568–69 and 1574–75.

== Family ==
He was second son of John Leigh of Ellesmere, Shropshire by Catherine, daughter of one Dod of Petsey in Stoke on Tern, also in Shropshire. He married Mary, daughter of Thomas Sturry of Rossall and had 4 sons and 1 daughter.
