= Shrewsbury (constituency) =

UK Parliament constituency (1295–1983, 2024 onwards)

Coordinates: 52.72°N 2.86°W

- County constituency for the House of Commons
- Boundaries since 2024
- Boundary of Shrewsbury in West Midlands region
- County: Shropshire
- Electorate: 75,139 (2023)
- Major settlements: Shrewsbury

Current constituency
- Created: 1918
- Member of Parliament: Julia Buckley (Labour)
- Seats: One

1295–1918
- Seats: 1295–1885: Two; 1885–1918: One
- Type of constituency: Borough constituency

Shrewsbury is a parliamentary constituency in England, centred on the town of Shrewsbury in Shropshire. It has been represented in the House of Commons of the Parliament of the United Kingdom since 2024 by Julia Buckley. A constituency for the town has existed since the 13th century; it was known as Shrewsbury and Atcham between 1983 and 2024.

== Constituency profile ==
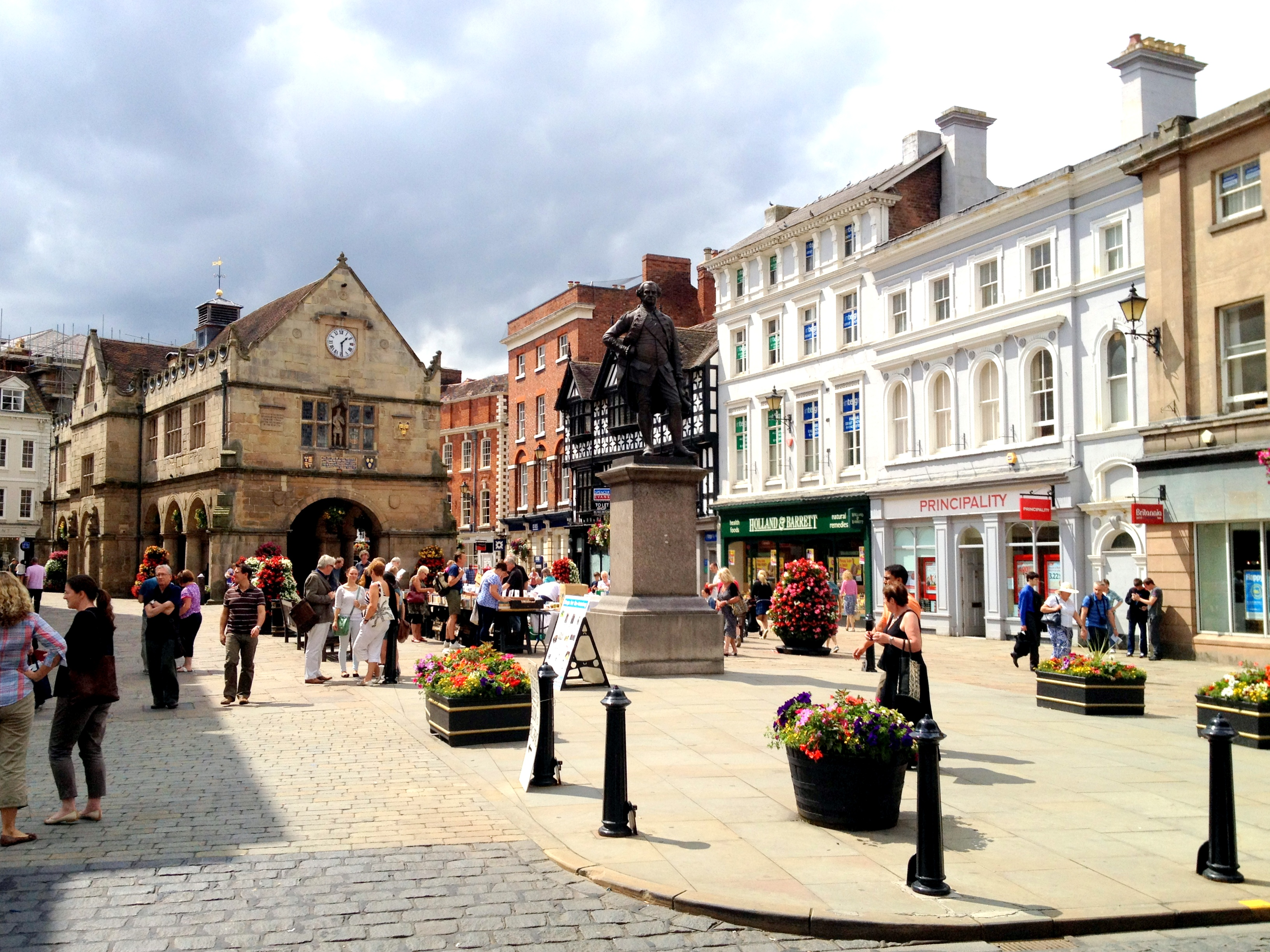
The Square, Shrewsbury

Shrewsbury is a constituency in Shropshire in the West Midlands region of England. Its main settlement is the town of Shrewsbury which has a population of around 79,000. Other settlements include the villages of Bayston Hill and Pontesbury.

This constituency covers the large town of Shrewsbury and its surrounding rural area which stretches to the Welsh border and contains many small villages, hamlets and farms. Some of these villages, like Hanwood and Asterley, have a history of coal mining. Shrewsbury is a historic market town of Anglo-Saxon origins and was traditionally an important stopping point for trade between England and Wales. Most of Shrewsbury and the rural areas have average levels of wealth, although the town's southern and western suburbs are highly-affluent. House prices across the constituency are generally higher than the rest of the West Midlands but lower than the UK average.

Shrewsbury has a low proportion of young adults and a large retired population. Residents have average levels of income and homeownership and the child poverty rate is below-average. They have average levels of education and a high proportion work in the health, retail and agriculture sectors. The percentage claiming unemployment benefits is low. White people made up 96% of the population at the 2021 census.

Most of the constituency is represented by Liberal Democrats at the local council, with some Labour Party, Green Party and Reform UK councillors elected in Shrewsbury town and some Conservatives elected in the rural villages. An estimated 54% of voters in the constituency supported leaving the European Union in the 2016 referendum, marginally higher than the UK-wide rate of 52%.

== Boundaries ==
1918–1950: The Borough of Shrewsbury, and the Rural Districts of Atcham and Chirbury.

1950–1974: The Borough of Shrewsbury, and the Rural District of Atcham.

1974–2024: As prior but with redrawn boundaries. The constituency was coextensive with the Borough of Shrewsbury and Atcham, which became the Central area of Shropshire Council after that council's formation.

2024–present

- The County of Shropshire electoral divisions of: Abbey; Bagley; Battlefield; Bayston Hill, Column and Sutton; Belle Vue; Bowbrook; Castlefields and Ditherington; Copthorne; Harlescott; Longden; Loton; Meole; Monkmoor; Porthill; Quarry and Coton Hill; Radbrook; Rea Valley; Sundorne; Tern; Underdale.

In 2024, the Burnell and Severn Valley wards were transferred to South Shropshire.

== History ==
Shrewsbury was founded in 1295 as parliamentary borough, returning two members to the House of Commons of England until 1707, then of the House of Commons of Great Britain from 1707 to 1800, and of the House of Commons of the United Kingdom from 1801 to 1885.

Famous MPs have included Sir Philip Sidney in 1581, Robert Clive (known as 'Clive of India') from 1761 to his death in 1774, and Benjamin Disraeli (later Prime Minister) in 1841–47. By the mid eighteenth century Shrewsbury was known as an independent constituency. The right of election was vested in resident burgesses paying scot and lot. By 1722 the number of voters exceeded 1300 but Parliament sharply reduced the number by excluding parts of Shrewsbury from the parliamentary borough.

Under the Redistribution of Seats Act 1885, its representation was reduced to one Member of Parliament (MP). The parliamentary borough was abolished with effect from the 1918 general election, and the name transferred to a new county constituency. The constituency was renamed to "Shrewsbury and Atcham" for the period from 1983 to 2024, with the exact same boundaries as had been in effect from 1974-1983.

Pre-2024 boundaries

Map of boundaries 1974-2024

On 10 December 2001, following his demand for a parliamentary debate before military intervention in Afghanistan, the incumbent Labour member, Paul Marsden, left the government's benches to join the Liberal Democrats; he remained there until 5 April 2005, when he sought to show strong solidarity with Labour Stop the War MPs by returning to his old party, becoming the first politician to cross the floor twice since Winston Churchill. During much of his time with the Liberal Democrats, Marsden was a senior health spokesman, shadowing the Secretary of State for Health and ministers.

Shrewsbury and Atcham was part of the Shropshire region for the purpose of reporting the results of the 2016 United Kingdom European Union membership referendum; the region voted 56.9% in favour of leaving the European Union on a turnout of 77.5%.

The seat returned to the name "Shrewsbury" as part of the 2023 Periodic Review of Westminster constituencies. This took effect from the 2024 United Kingdom general election. The constituency was won by Julia Buckley, who became the first Labour Party MP to represent the constituency under its name of Shrewsbury, as well as the first woman to represent the seat under either of its names.

== Members of Parliament ==
=== Borough of Shrewsbury ===
==== MPs 1295–1660 ====
Constituency created in 1295

Parliament	First member	Second member
1386	Robert Grafton	Hugh Wigan
1388 (Feb)	Hugh Wigan	Robert Thornes
1388 (Sep)	Robert Grafton	Hugh Wigan
1390 (Jan)	Robert Grafton	Thomas Pride
1390 (Nov)		
1391	Hugh Wigan	Thomas Pride
1393	Thomas Pride	Thomas Gamel
1394	Thomas Pride	Hugh Wigan
1395	Richard Aldescote	Roger Thornes
1397 (Jan)	Thomas Skinner	John Geoffrey
1397 (Sep)		
1399	Nicholas Gerard	Thomas Berwick
1401		
1402	Thomas Pride	Roger Thornes
1404 (Jan)	Thomas Pride	Simon Tour
1404 (Oct)		
1406	John Perle	Robert Thornes
1407	Thomas Pride	John Scriven
1410	Robert Thornes	Roger Thornes
1411	Thomas Pride	John Whithiford
1413 (Feb)		
1413 (May)	David Holbache	Urian St Pierre
1414 (Apr)	Thomas Pride	?
1414 (Nov)	Robert Horseley	William Horde
1415	William Horde	John Shotton
1416 (Mar)	William Horde	John Beget
1416 (Oct)	William Horde	Robert Horseley
1417	William Horde	David Holbache
1419	Roger Corbet (died 1430)	David Rathbone
1420	Robert Whitcombe	Richard Bentley
1421 (May)	Urian St Pierre	Robert Whitcombe
1421 (Dec)	William Horde	Robert Whitcombe
1510	Roger Thornes	Thomas Knight
1512	Thomas Kynaston	Thomas Trentham
1515	Sir Thomas Kynaston	Thomas Trentham
1523	Edmund Cole	Adam Mytton
1529	Robert Dudley alias Sutton	Adam Mytton
1536	Robert Dudley alias Sutton	Adam Mytton
1539	Nicholas Purcell	Robert Thornes
1542	Adam Mytton	Richard Mytton
1545	Nicholas Purcell	Edward Hosier
1547	Reginald Corbet	John Evans
1553 (Mar)	Nicholas Purcell	George Leigh
1553 (Oct)	Reginald Corbet	Nicholas Purcell
1554 (Apr)	Richard Mytton	Nicholas Purcell
1554 (Nov)	Thomas Mytton	George Leigh
1555	Reginald Corbet	Nicholas Purcell
1558	Nicholas Purcell	George Leigh
1558–9	Robert Ireland	George Leigh
1562–3	Robert Ireland	Richard Purcell
1571	George Leigh	Robert Ireland
1572 (Apr)	Richard Purcell	George Leigh, died and replaced January 1581 by Philip Sidney
1584 (Nov)	Thomas Owen	Richard Barker
1586 (Oct)	Reginald Scriven	Thomas Harris
1588 (Oct)	Reginald Scriven	Andrew Newport
1593	Reginald Scriven	Robert Wright
1597	Reginald Scriven	Roger Owen
1601 (Oct)	Reginald Scriven	John Barker
1604	Richard Barker	Francis Tate
1614	Lewis Prowde	Francis Berkeley
1621	Sir Richard Newport	Francis Berkeley
1624	Francis Berkeley	Thomas Owen
1625	Sir William Owen	Thomas Owen
1626	Sir William Owen	Thomas Owen
1628	Sir William Owen	Thomas Owen
1629–1640	No Parliaments summoned	
1640 (Apr)	Francis Newport	Thomas Owen
1640 (Nov)	Francis Newport	William Spurstow
1645	Thomas Hunt	William Massam
1648	Thomas Hunt	William Massam
1653	Shrewsbury not represented in Barebones Parliament	
1654	Richard Cheshire	Humphrey Mackworth
1656	Samuel Jones	Humphrey Mackworth
1658	William Jones	Humphrey Mackworth

==== MPs 1660–1885 ====
Election	First member	First party	Second member	Second party
1660	Samuel Jones		Thomas Jones	
1661	Robert Leighton		Thomas Jones	
1677	Robert Leighton		Sir Richard Corbet	
1679	Edward Kynaston		Sir Richard Corbet	
1685	Edward Kynaston		Sir Francis Edwardes, 1st Baronet	
1689	Hon. Andrew Newport	Tory	Sir Francis Edwardes, 1st Baronet	
1690	Hon. Andrew Newport	Tory	Richard Mytton	
1694	Hon. Andrew Newport	Tory	John Kynaston	
1698	Richard Mytton		John Kynaston	
1709	vacant		Sir Edward Leighton	
January 1710	Thomas Jones		Sir Edward Leighton	
October 1710	Edward Cressett		Richard Mytton	
1713	Edward Cressett		Thomas Jones	
1714	Edward Cressett		Corbet Kynaston	
February 1715	Thomas Jones		Corbet Kynaston	
November 1715	Andrew Corbet		Corbet Kynaston	
1722	Richard Lyster		Corbet Kynaston	
1723	Sir Richard Corbet		Orlando Bridgeman	
1727	Richard Lyster		Sir John Astley	
1734	William Kinaston		Sir Richard Corbet	
1749 by-election	Thomas Hill		Sir Richard Corbet	
1754	Thomas Hill		Robert More	
1761	Thomas Hill		Robert Clive	Tory
1768	Noel Hill		Robert Clive	Tory
1774	Charlton Leighton	Tory	Robert Clive	Tory
March 8, 1775	William Pulteney	Whig	Robert Clive	Tory
March 17, 1775	William Pulteney	Whig	John Corbet	Tory
1780	William Pulteney	Whig	Sir Charlton Leighton	Tory
1784 by-election	William Pulteney	Whig	John Hill	Tory
1796	William Pulteney	Whig	William Hill	Tory
1805 by-election	John Hill	Tory	William Hill	Tory
1806	Henry Grey Bennet	Whig	William Hill	Tory
1807	Thomas Jones	Tory	William Hill	Tory
1811 by-election	Henry Grey Bennet	Whig	William Hill	Tory
1812	Henry Grey Bennet	Whig	Sir Rowland Hill	Tory
1814 by-election	Henry Grey Bennet	Whig	Richard Lyster	Tory
1819 by-election	Henry Grey Bennet	Whig	John Mytton	Tory
1820	Henry Grey Bennet	Whig	Panton Corbett	Tory
1826	Robert Aglionby Slaney	Whig	Panton Corbett	Tory
1830	Robert Aglionby Slaney	Whig	Richard Jenkins	Tory
1832	Robert Aglionby Slaney	Whig	Sir John Hanmer	Tory
1834	Robert Aglionby Slaney	Whig	Sir John Hanmer	Conservative
1835	John Cressett-Pelham	Conservative	Sir John Hanmer	Conservative
1837	Richard Jenkins	Conservative	Robert Aglionby Slaney	Whig
1841	George Tomline	Conservative	Benjamin Disraeli	Conservative
1847	Edward Holmes Baldock	Conservative	Robert Aglionby Slaney	Whig
1852	Edward Holmes Baldock	Conservative	George Tomline	Peelite
1857	Robert Aglionby Slaney	Whig	George Tomline	Peelite
1859	Robert Aglionby Slaney	Liberal	George Tomline	Liberal
1862 by-election	Henry Robertson	Liberal	George Tomline	Liberal
1865	William James Clement	Liberal	George Tomline	Liberal
1868	William James Clement	Liberal	James Figgins	Conservative
1870 by-election	Douglas Straight	Conservative	James Figgins	Conservative
1874	Charles Cecil Cotes	Liberal	Henry Robertson	Liberal
1885	Representation reduced to one Member			

==== MPs 1885–1918 ====
Election	Member	Party
1885	James Watson	Conservative
1892	Henry David Greene	Conservative
1906	Sir Clement Lloyd Hill	Conservative
1913 by-election	George Butler Lloyd	Conservative
1918	Borough abolished, name transferred to new county division	

=== County constituency division of Shropshire ===
==== Shrewsbury, 1918–1983 ====
Election	Member	Party
1918	George Butler Lloyd	Coalition Conservative
1922	Dudley Ryder	Conservative
1923	Joseph Sunlight	Liberal
1924	Dudley Ryder	Conservative
1929	Arthur Duckworth	Conservative
1945	Sir John Langford-Holt	Conservative

==== Shrewsbury and Atcham, 1983–2024 ====
Election	Member	Party
1983	Derek Conway	Conservative
1997	Paul Marsden	Labour
2001	Paul Marsden	Liberal Democrats
2005	Paul Marsden	Labour
2005	Daniel Kawczynski	Conservative

==== Shrewsbury, 2024–present ====
Election	Member	Party
2024	Julia Buckley	Labour

== Election results ==
=== Graph ===
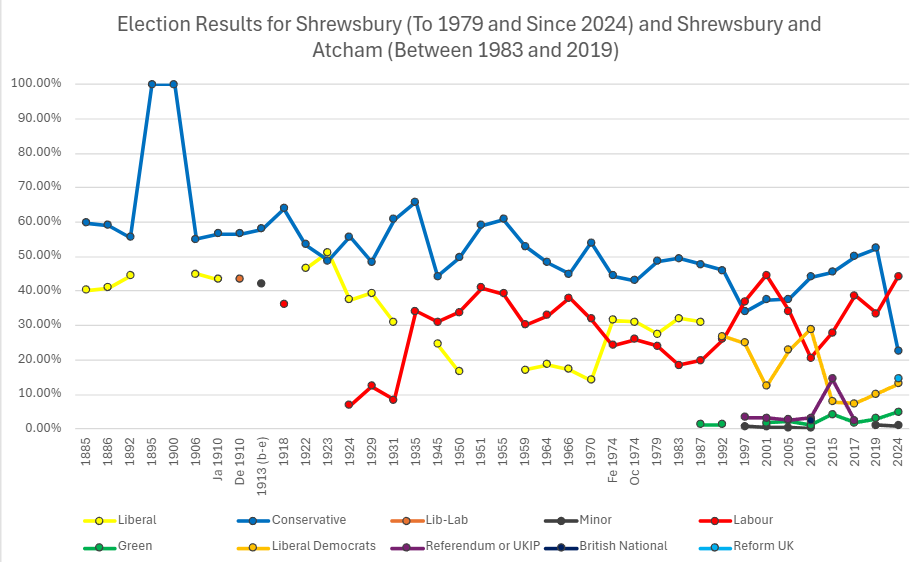
The letters "b-e" represent where a by-election has taken place.

=== Shrewsbury, 1830–1983 ===
==== Elections in the 1830s ====
General election 1830: Shrewsbury (2 seats)
Party	Candidate	Votes	%	±%
Tory	Richard Jenkins	754	42.8	
Whig	Robert Aglionby Slaney	563	32.0	
Tory	Panton Corbett	445	25.3	
Turnout		974	c. 81.2	
Registered electors		c. 1,200		
Majority		191	10.8	
Tory hold		Swing		
Majority		118	6.7	
Whig hold		Swing		

General election 1831: Shrewsbury (2 seats)
Party	Candidate	Votes	%	±%
Whig	Robert Aglionby Slaney	178	30.7	−1.3
Tory	Richard Jenkins	175	30.2	−12.6
Tory	Thomas Boycott	124	21.4	−3.9
Radical	Richard Potter	103	17.8	New
Turnout		309	c. 25.8	c. −55.4
Registered electors		c. 1,200		
Majority		3	0.5	−6.2
Whig hold		Swing	+3.5	
Majority		51	8.8	−2.0
Tory hold		Swing	−5.7	

General election 1832: Shrewsbury (2 seats)
Party	Candidate	Votes	%	±%
Tory	John Hanmer	808	36.1	+5.9
Whig	Robert Aglionby Slaney	797	35.6	+4.9
Tory	John Cressett-Pelham	634	28.3	+6.9
Turnout		1,314	76.7	c. +50.9
Registered electors		1,714		
Majority		11	0.5	−8.3
Tory hold		Swing	+1.7	
Majority		163	7.3	+6.8
Whig hold		Swing	−4.0	

General election 1835: Shrewsbury (2 seats)
Party	Candidate	Votes	%	±%
Conservative	John Hanmer	761	38.7	+2.6
Conservative	John Cressett-Pelham	629	32.0	+3.7
Whig	Robert Aglionby Slaney	578	29.4	−6.2
Majority		51	2.6	+2.1
Turnout		c. 984	c. 77.5	c. +0.8
Registered electors		1,270		
Conservative hold		Swing	+2.9	
Conservative gain from Whig		Swing	+3.4	

General election 1837: Shrewsbury (2 seats)
Party	Candidate	Votes	%	±%
Conservative	Richard Jenkins	700	27.0	−11.7
Whig	Robert Aglionby Slaney	697	26.9	+12.2
Conservative	John Cressett-Pelham	655	25.3	−6.7
Whig	Francis Dashwood	537	20.7	+6.0
Turnout		1,312	89.1	c. +11.6
Registered electors		1,473		
Majority		3	0.1	−2.5
Conservative hold		Swing	−10.4	
Majority		42	1.6	N/A
Whig gain from Conservative		Swing	+10.7	

==== Elections in the 1840s ====
General election 1841: Shrewsbury (2 seats)
Party	Candidate	Votes	%	±%
Conservative	George Tomline	793	28.7	+1.7
Conservative	Benjamin Disraeli	785	28.4	+3.1
Whig	Love Jones-Parry	605	21.9	−5.0
Whig	Christopher Temple	578	20.9	+0.2
Majority		180	6.5	+6.4
Turnout		1,384	88.5	−0.6
Registered electors		1,666		
Conservative hold		Swing	+2.1	
Conservative gain from Whig		Swing	+2.8	

General election 1847: Shrewsbury (2 seats)
Party	Candidate	Votes	%	±%
Conservative	Edward Holmes Baldock	769	34.3	−22.8
Whig	Robert Aglionby Slaney	743	33.1	−9.7
Peelite	George Tomline	732	32.6	+3.9
Turnout		1,122 (est)	62.2 (est)	−26.3
Registered electors		1,805		
Majority		26	1.2	−5.3
Conservative hold		Swing	−12.4	
Majority		11	0.5	N/A
Whig gain from Conservative		Swing	−5.8	

==== Elections in the 1850s ====
General election 1852: Shrewsbury (2 seats)
Party	Candidate	Votes	%	±%
Peelite	George Tomline	1,159	49.7	+17.1
Conservative	Edward Holmes Baldock	736	31.5	−2.8
Radical	Augustus Robinson	438	18.8	−14.3
Turnout		1,167 (est)	70.0 (est)	+7.8
Registered electors		1,666		
Majority		423	18.2	N/A
Peelite gain from Whig		Swing	+12.1	
Majority		298	12.7	+11.5
Conservative hold		Swing	+2.2	

General election 1857: Shrewsbury (2 seats)
Party	Candidate	Votes	%	±%
Peelite	George Tomline	706	29.0	−20.7
Whig	Robert Aglionby Slaney	695	28.6	N/A
Conservative	John Walter Huddleston	548	22.5	+13.1
Conservative	Richard Phibbs	484	19.9	+10.5
Turnout		1,217 (est)	75.2 (est)	+5.2
Registered electors		1,617		
Majority		11	0.4	−17.8
Peelite hold		Swing	−16.3	
Majority		147	6.1	N/A
Whig gain from Conservative		Swing		

General election 1859: Shrewsbury (2 seats)
Party	Candidate	Votes	%	±%
Liberal	Robert Aglionby Slaney	Unopposed		
Liberal	George Tomline	Unopposed		
Registered electors		1,635		
Liberal hold				
Liberal hold				

==== Elections in the 1860s ====
Slaney's death caused a by-election.

By-election, 2 June 1862: Shrewsbury (1 seat)
Party	Candidate	Votes	%	±%
Liberal	Henry Robertson	671	64.4	N/A
Conservative	Richard Banner Oakeley	361	34.6	New
Ind. Conservative	Henry Atkins	10	1.0	New
Majority		310	29.8	N/A
Turnout		1,042	69.2	N/A
Registered electors		1,506		
Liberal hold		Swing	N/A	

General election 1865: Shrewsbury (2 seats)
Party	Candidate	Votes	%	±%
Liberal	William James Clement	Unopposed		
Liberal	George Tomline	Unopposed		
Registered electors		1,533		
Liberal hold				
Liberal hold				

General election 1868: Shrewsbury (2 seats)
Party	Candidate	Votes	%	±%
Liberal	William James Clement	1,840	43.0	N/A
Conservative	James Figgins	1,751	40.9	New
Liberal	Robert Crawford	685	16.0	N/A
Turnout		3,014 (est)	89.1 (est)	N/A
Registered electors		3,620		
Majority		89	2.1	N/A
Liberal hold		Swing	N/A	
Majority		1,066	24.9	N/A
Conservative gain from Liberal		Swing	N/A	

==== Elections in the 1870s ====
Clement's death caused a by-election.

By-election, 21 Sep 1870: Shrewsbury (1 seat)
Party	Candidate	Votes	%	±%
Conservative	Douglas Straight	1,291	50.7	+9.8
Liberal	Charles Cecil Cotes	1,253	49.3	−9.7
Majority		38	1.4	−23.5
Turnout		2,544	75.2	−13.9
Registered electors		3,381		
Conservative gain from Liberal		Swing	+9.8	

General election 1874: Shrewsbury (2 seats)
Party	Candidate	Votes	%	±%
Liberal	Charles Cecil Cotes	1,672	28.1	−14.9
Liberal	Henry Robertson	1,561	26.2	+10.2
Conservative	James Figgins	1,388	23.3	+2.8
Conservative	Douglas Straight	1,328	22.3	+1.8
Majority		173	2.9	+0.8
Turnout		2,975 (est)	82.2 (est)	−6.9
Registered electors		3,620		
Liberal hold		Swing	−8.6	
Liberal gain from Conservative		Swing	+4.0	

==== Elections in the 1880s ====
General election 1880: Shrewsbury (2 seats)
Party	Candidate	Votes	%	±%
Liberal	Charles Cecil Cotes	1,945	27.7	−0.4
Liberal	Henry Robertson	1,884	26.8	+0.6
Conservative	Andrew Scoble	1,622	23.1	−0.2
Conservative	Francis Needham	1,568	22.3	0.0
Majority		262	3.7	+0.8
Turnout		3,510 (est)	91.3 (est)	+9.1
Registered electors		3,846		
Liberal hold		Swing	−0.1	
Liberal hold		Swing	+0.3	

Cotes was appointed a Lord Commissioner of the Treasury, requiring a by-election.

By-election, 10 May 1880: Shrewsbury (1 seat)
Party	Candidate	Votes	%	±%
Liberal	Charles Cecil Cotes	Unopposed		
Liberal hold				

Representation reduced to one Member

General election 1885: Shrewsbury
Party	Candidate	Votes	%	±%
Conservative	James Watson	2,244	59.7	+14.1
Liberal	Charles Waring	1,512	40.3	−14.2
Majority		732	19.4	N/A
Turnout		3,756	90.9	−0.4 (est)
Registered electors		4,131		
Conservative gain from Liberal		Swing	+14.2	

General election 1886: Shrewsbury
Party	Candidate	Votes	%	±%
Conservative	James Watson	1,826	59.0	−0.7
Liberal	Maurice Jones	1,269	41.0	+0.7
Majority		557	18.0	−1.4
Turnout		3,095	74.9	−16.0
Registered electors		4,131		
Conservative hold		Swing	−0.7	

==== Elections in the 1890s ====
General election 1892: Shrewsbury
Party	Candidate	Votes	%	±%
Conservative	Henry David Greene	1,979	55.7	−3.3
Liberal	James Brend Batten	1,573	44.3	+3.3
Majority		406	11.4	−6.6
Turnout		3,552	83.4	+8.5
Registered electors		4,258		
Conservative hold		Swing	+3.3	

General election 1895: Shrewsbury
Party	Candidate	Votes	%	±%
Conservative	Henry David Greene	Unopposed		
Conservative hold				

==== Elections in the 1900s ====
General election 1900: Shrewsbury
Party	Candidate	Votes	%	±%
Conservative	Henry David Greene	Unopposed		
Conservative hold				

Hemmerde

General election 1906: Shrewsbury
Party	Candidate	Votes	%	±%
Conservative	Clement Lloyd Hill	2,395	55.1	N/A
Liberal	Edward Hemmerde	1,955	44.9	New
Majority		440	10.2	N/A
Turnout		4,350	92.4	N/A
Registered electors		4,709		
Conservative hold		Swing	N/A	

==== Elections in the 1910s ====
General election January 1910: Shrewsbury
Party	Candidate	Votes	%	±%
Conservative	Clement Lloyd Hill	2,596	56.6	+1.5
Liberal	John Haworth Whitworth	1,994	43.4	−1.5
Majority		602	13.2	+3.0
Turnout		4,590	94.0	+1.6
Registered electors		4,882		
Conservative hold		Swing	+1.5	

General election December 1910: Shrewsbury
Party	Candidate	Votes	%	±%
Conservative	Clement Lloyd Hill	2,423	56.6	0.0
Lib-Lab	Thomas Pace	1,855	43.4	0.0
Majority		568	13.2	0.0
Turnout		4,278	87.6	−6.4
Registered electors		4,882		
Conservative hold		Swing	+0.0	

1913 Shrewsbury by-election
Party	Candidate	Votes	%	±%
Unionist	George Butler Lloyd	2,412	58.3	+1.7
Independent	James Robert Morris	1,727	41.7	New
Majority		685	16.6	+3.4
Turnout		4,139	81.0	−6.6
Registered electors		5,107		
Unionist hold		Swing		

General Election 1914–15:

Another General Election was required to take place before the end of 1915. The political parties had been making preparations for an election to take place and by July 1914, the following candidates had been selected;

- Unionist: George Lloyd
- Liberal:

General election 1918: Shrewsbury
Party		Candidate	Votes	%	±%
C	Unionist	George Butler Lloyd	9,826	63.9	+7.3
	Labour	Arthur Taylor	5,542	36.1	New
Majority			4,284	27.8	+14.6
Turnout			15,368	60.4	−27.2
Registered electors			25,459		
	Unionist hold		Swing		
C indicates candidate endorsed by the coalition government.

==== Elections in the 1920s ====
General election 1922: Shrewsbury
Party	Candidate	Votes	%	±%
Unionist	Dudley Ryder	10,999	53.9	−10.0
Liberal	Joseph Sunlight	9,401	46.1	New
Majority		1,598	7.8	−20.0
Turnout		20,400		
Unionist hold		Swing		

General election 1923: Shrewsbury
Party	Candidate	Votes	%	±%
Liberal	Joseph Sunlight	11,097	51.3	+5.2
Unionist	Dudley Ryder	10,548	48.7	−5.2
Majority		549	2.6	N/A
Turnout		21,645		
Liberal gain from Unionist		Swing	+5.2	

General election 1924: Shrewsbury
Party	Candidate	Votes	%	±%
Unionist	Dudley Ryder	13,220	55.6	+6.9
Liberal	Joseph Sunlight	8,945	37.6	−13.7
Labour	David Baxter Lawley	1,614	6.8	New
Majority		4,275	18.0	N/A
Turnout		23,779		
Unionist gain from Liberal		Swing	+10.3	

General election 1929: Shrewsbury
Party	Candidate	Votes	%	±%
Unionist	Arthur Duckworth	14,586	48.6	−7.0
Liberal	Joseph Sunlight	11,794	39.3	+1.7
Labour	A A Beach	3,662	12.2	+5.4
Majority		2,792	9.3	−8.7
Turnout		30,042		
Unionist hold		Swing	−4.4	

==== Elections in the 1930s ====
General election 1931: Shrewsbury
Party	Candidate	Votes	%	±%
Conservative	Arthur Duckworth	18,505	60.8	+12.2
Liberal	Elizabeth Morgan	9,358	30.8	−8.5
Labour	Edward Porter	2,567	8.4	−3.8
Majority		9,147	30.0	+20.7
Turnout		30,430	82.7	
Conservative hold		Swing		

General election 1935: Shrewsbury
Party	Candidate	Votes	%	±%
Conservative	Arthur Duckworth	18,401	65.7	+4.9
Labour	Cecil Poole	9,606	34.3	+25.9
Majority		8,795	31.4	+1.4
Turnout		28,007	74.2	−8.5
Conservative hold		Swing		

==== Elections in the 1940s ====
General Election 1939–40:

Another General Election was required to take place before the end of 1940. The political parties had been making preparations for an election to take place from 1939 and by the end of this year, the following candidates had been selected;

- Conservative: Arthur Duckworth
- Liberal: John Share Jones
- Labour: Stanley Norman Chapman

The outbreak of World War II in September 1939 caused general elections to be suspended until 1945.

General election 1945: Shrewsbury
Party	Candidate	Votes	%	±%
Conservative	John Langford-Holt	15,174	44.4	−21.3
Labour	Stanley Norman Chapman	10,580	31.0	−3.3
Liberal	Arthur Comyns Carr	8,412	24.6	New
Majority		4,594	13.4	−18.0
Turnout		34,166	73.0	−1.2
Conservative hold		Swing	-9.0	

==== Elections in the 1950s ====
General election 1950: Shrewsbury
Party	Candidate	Votes	%	±%
Conservative	John Langford-Holt	18,470	49.7	+5.3
Labour	Robert Cant	12,542	33.8	+2.8
Liberal	Norman Elliott	6,126	16.5	−8.1
Majority		5,928	15.9	+2.5
Turnout		37,138	83.9	+11.9
Conservative hold		Swing		

General election 1951: Shrewsbury
Party	Candidate	Votes	%	±%
Conservative	John Langford-Holt	21,503	59.3	+9.6
Labour	Robert Cant	14,735	40.7	+6.9
Majority		6,768	18.6	+2.7
Turnout		36,238	80.7	−3.2
Conservative hold		Swing		

General election 1955: Shrewsbury
Party	Candidate	Votes	%	±%
Conservative	John Langford-Holt	21,319	60.8	+1.5
Labour	Geoffrey Allen	13,726	39.2	–1.5
Majority		7,593	21.6	+3.0
Turnout		35,045	77.5	−3.2
Conservative hold		Swing		

General election 1959: Shrewsbury
Party	Candidate	Votes	%	±%
Conservative	John Langford-Holt	19,970	53.0	–7.8
Labour	Kenneth V Russell	11,338	30.1	–9.1
Liberal	Harold Shaw	6,387	16.9	New
Majority		8,632	22.9	+1.3
Turnout		37,695	80.5	+3.0
Conservative hold		Swing		

==== Elections in the 1960s ====
General election 1964: Shrewsbury
Party	Candidate	Votes	%	±%
Conservative	John Langford-Holt	18,517	48.3	–4.7
Labour	James O Murphy	12,658	33.0	+2.9
Liberal	Geoffrey Keith Roberts	7,180	18.7	+1.8
Majority		5,859	15.3	−7.6
Turnout		38,355	78.2	−2.3
Conservative hold		Swing		

General election 1966: Shrewsbury
Party	Candidate	Votes	%	±%
Conservative	John Langford-Holt	17,569	45.2	–3.1
Labour	Thomas S Pritchard	14,603	37.6	+4.6
Liberal	William Marsh	6,660	17.2	–1.5
Majority		2,966	7.6	−7.7
Turnout		38,832	76.5	−1.7
Conservative hold		Swing		

==== Elections in the 1970s ====
General election 1970: Shrewsbury
Party	Candidate	Votes	%	±%
Conservative	John Langford-Holt	22,619	53.9	+8.7
Labour	Peter A Kent	13,413	31.9	–5.7
Liberal	Ian R Brodie	5,960	14.2	–3.0
Majority		9,206	22.0	+14.4
Turnout		41,992	73.1	−3.4
Conservative hold		Swing		

General election February 1974: Shrewsbury
Party	Candidate	Votes	%	±%
Conservative	John Langford-Holt	21,095	44.4	–9.5
Liberal	William Marsh	14,914	31.4	+17.2
Labour	D.W. Woodvine	11,536	24.3	–7.6
Majority		6,181	13.0	−9.0
Turnout		47,545	79.8	+6.7
Conservative hold		Swing		

General election October 1974: Shrewsbury
Party	Candidate	Votes	%	±%
Conservative	John Langford-Holt	19,064	43.1	–1.3
Liberal	William Marsh	13,642	30.9	–0.5
Labour	D.W. Woodvine	11,504	26.0	+1.7
Majority		5,422	12.2	−0.8
Turnout		44,210	73.4	−6.4
Conservative hold		Swing		

General election 1979: Shrewsbury
Party	Candidate	Votes	%	±%
Conservative	John Langford-Holt	23,548	48.6	+5.5
Liberal	A. Laurie	13,364	27.6	–3.3
Labour	J. Bishton	11,558	23.9	–2.1
Majority		10,184	21.0	+8.8
Turnout		48,470	76.7	+3.3
Conservative hold		Swing		

=== Shrewsbury and Atcham, 1983–2024 ===
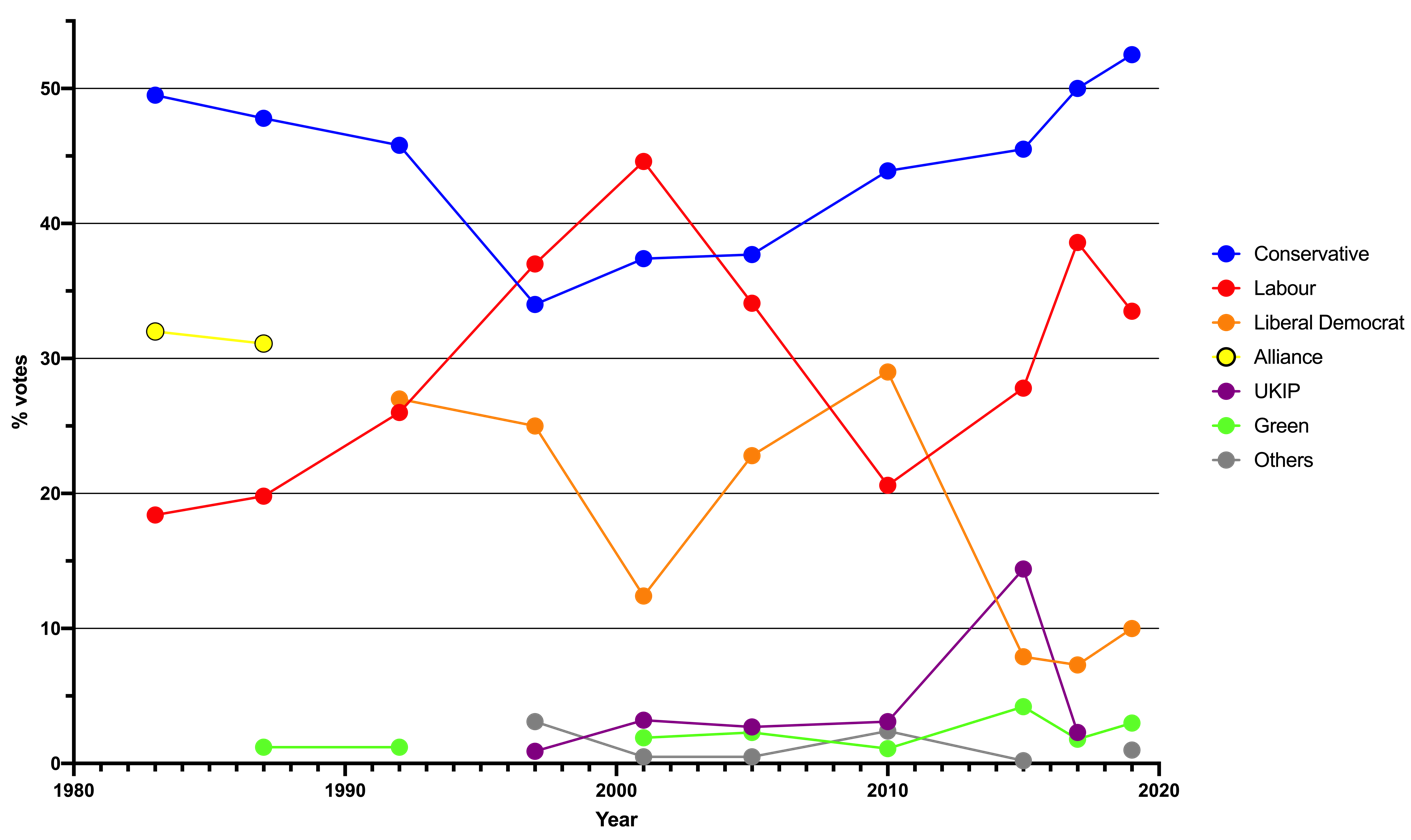
General election results in Shrewsbury & Atcham, from its creation in 1983 up to the 2019 election.

==== Elections in the 1980s ====
General election 1983: Shrewsbury and Atcham
Party	Candidate	Votes	%	±%
Conservative	Derek Conway	24,397	49.5	▲0.9
Alliance	Anthony Bowen	15,773	32.0	▲4.4
Labour	Alan Mosley	9,080	18.4	▼5.5
Majority		8,624	17.5	N/A
Turnout		49,250	74.0	▼2.7
Conservative win (new seat)				

General election 1987: Shrewsbury and Atcham
Party	Candidate	Votes	%	±%
Conservative	Derek Conway	26,027	47.8	▼1.7
Alliance	Robert Hutchison	16,963	31.1	▼0.9
Labour	Liz Owen	10,797	19.8	▲1.4
Green	Geoff Hardy	660	1.2	New
Majority		9,064	16.7	▼1.2
Turnout		54,447	77.0	▲3.0
Conservative hold		Swing	▼1.6	

==== Elections in the 1990s ====
General election 1992: Shrewsbury and Atcham
Party	Candidate	Votes	%	±%
Conservative	Derek Conway	26,681	45.8	▼2.0
Liberal Democrats	Kenneth Hemsley	15,716	27.0	▼4.1
Labour	Liz Owen	15,157	26.0	▲6.2
Green	Geoff Hardy	677	1.2	Steady
Majority		10,965	18.8	▲2.1
Turnout		58,231	82.5	▲5.5
Conservative hold		Swing	▼4.1	

General election 1997: Shrewsbury and Atcham
Party	Candidate	Votes	%	±%
Labour	Paul Marsden	20,484	37.0	▲11.0
Conservative	Derek Conway	18,814	34.0	▼11.8
Liberal Democrats	Anne Woolland	13,838	25.0	▼2.0
Referendum	Dylan Barker	1,346	2.4	New
UKIP	David Rowlands	477	0.9	New
Country, Field and Shooting Sports	Alan Dignan	257	0.5	New
People's Party	Alan Williams	128	0.2	New
Majority		1,670	3.0	N/A
Turnout		55,344	75.3	▼7.2
Labour gain from Conservative		Swing	▲11.4	

==== Elections in the 2000s ====
General election 2001: Shrewsbury and Atcham
Party	Candidate	Votes	%	±%
Labour	Paul Marsden	22,253	44.6	▲7.6
Conservative	Anthea McIntyre	18,674	37.4	▲3.4
Liberal Democrats	Jonathan Rule	6,173	12.4	▼12.6
UKIP	Henry Curteis	1,620	3.2	▲2.4
Green	Emma Bullard	931	1.9	New
Independent	James Gollins	258	0.5	New
Majority		3,579	7.2	▲4.2
Turnout		49,909	66.6	▼8.7
Labour hold		Swing	▲2.1	

General election 2005: Shrewsbury and Atcham
Party	Candidate	Votes	%	±%
Conservative	Daniel Kawczynski	18,960	37.7	▲0.3
Labour	Michael Ion	17,152	34.1	▼10.5
Liberal Democrats	Richard Burt	11,487	22.8	▲10.4
UKIP	Peter Lewis	1,349	2.7	▼0.5
Green	Emma Bullard	1,138	2.3	▲0.4
Independent	James Gollins	126	0.3	▼0.2
World	Nigel Harris	84	0.2	New
Majority		1,808	3.6	N/A
Turnout		50,296	68.7	▲2.1
Conservative gain from Labour		Swing	▲5.4	

==== Elections in the 2010s ====
General election 2010: Shrewsbury and Atcham
Party	Candidate	Votes	%	±%
Conservative	Daniel Kawczynski	23,313	43.9	▲6.3
Liberal Democrats	Charles West	15,369	29.0	▲6.1
Labour	Jon Tandy	10,915	20.6	▼13.5
UKIP	Peter Lewis	1,627	3.1	▲0.4
BNP	James Whittall	1,168	2.2	New
Green	Alan Whittaker	565	1.1	▼1.2
Impact	James Gollins	88	0.2	New
Majority		7,944	15.0	▲11.4
Turnout		53,045	70.3	▲1.0
Conservative hold		Swing	▲0.1	

General election 2015: Shrewsbury and Atcham
Party	Candidate	Votes	%	±%
Conservative	Daniel Kawczynski	24,628	45.5	▲1.6
Labour	Laura Davies	15,063	27.8	▲7.3
UKIP	Suzanne Evans	7,813	14.4	▲11.4
Liberal Democrats	Christine Tinker	4,268	7.9	▼21.1
Green	Emma Bullard	2,247	4.2	▲3.1
Children of the Atom	Stirling McNeillie	83	0.2	New
Majority		9,565	17.7	▲2.7
Turnout		54,102	70.8	▲0.5
Conservative hold		Swing	▼2.9	

General election 2017: Shrewsbury and Atcham
Party	Candidate	Votes	%	±%
Conservative	Daniel Kawczynski	29,073	50.0	▲4.4
Labour	Laura Davies	22,446	38.6	▲10.7
Liberal Democrats	Hannah Fraser	4,254	7.3	▼0.6
UKIP	Edward Higginbottom	1,363	2.3	▼12.1
Green	Emma Bullard	1,067	1.8	▼2.3
Majority		6,627	11.4	▼6.3
Turnout		58,203	73.6	▲2.8
Conservative hold		Swing	▼3.1	

General election 2019: Shrewsbury and Atcham
Party	Candidate	Votes	%	±%
Conservative	Daniel Kawczynski	31,021	52.5	▲2.6
Labour	Julia Buckley	19,804	33.5	▼5.1
Liberal Democrats	Nat Green	5,906	10.0	▲2.7
Green	Julian Dean	1,762	3.0	▲1.2
Independent	Hannah Locke	572	1.0	New
Majority		11,217	19.0	▲7.6
Turnout		59,065	71.8	▼1.8
Conservative hold		Swing	▲3.9	

=== Shrewsbury, 2024–present ===
==== Elections in the 2020s ====
General election 2024: Shrewsbury
Party	Candidate	Votes	%	±%
Labour	Julia Buckley	22,932	44.3	+9.0
Conservative	Daniel Kawczynski	11,577	22.4	−26.9
Reform	Victor Applegate	7,524	14.5	N/A
Liberal Democrats	Alex Wagner	6,722	13.0	+2.2
Green	Julian Dean	2,387	4.6	+1.4
English Democrat	Chris Bovill	241	0.5	N/A
Independent	James Gollins	177	0.3	N/A
Majority		11,355	22.0	
Turnout		51,560	67.3	–1.3
Labour gain from Conservative		Swing	+18.0	

== See also ==
- Parliamentary constituencies in Shropshire
- List of parliamentary constituencies in West Midlands (region)
- Unreformed House of Commons

== Sources ==
- Stooks Smith, Henry. (1973) [1844-1850]. Craig, F. W. S. (ed.). The Parliaments of England (2nd ed.). Chichester: Parliamentary Research Services. pp. 276–278. ISBN 0-900178-13-2.
- Craig, F. W. S. (1989) [1977]. British parliamentary election results 1832–1885 (2nd ed.). Chichester: Parliamentary Research Services. pp. 277–278. ISBN 0-900178-26-4.
- Craig, F. W. S. (1989) [1974]. British parliamentary election results 1885–1918 (2nd ed.). Chichester: Parliamentary Research Services. p. 188. ISBN 0-900178-27-2.
- Craig, F. W. S. (1983) [1969]. British parliamentary election results 1918–1949 (3rd ed.). Chichester: Parliamentary Research Services. p. 452. ISBN 0-900178-06-X.
- The History of Parliament: the House of Commons - Shrewsbury, Borough, 1386 to 1831
