= Reginald Corbet =

Member of the Parliament of England

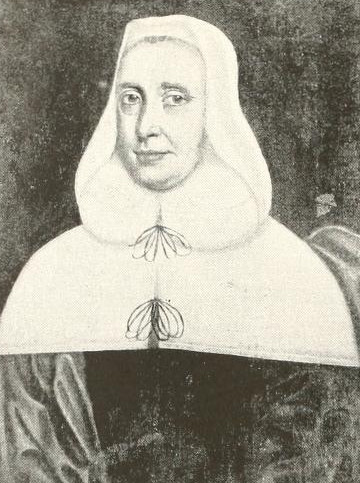
Reginald Corbet of Stoke upon Tern (died 1566), a prominent English judge of the mid-Tudor period

Reginald Corbet (died 1566) was a distinguished lawyer in four reigns across the mid-Tudor period, and prospered throughout, although he seems to have been firmly Protestant in sympathy. He was appointed serjeant-at-law and Justice of the King's Bench, and represented Much Wenlock in the parliament of 1542 and Shrewsbury in those of 1547, October 1553 and 1555. He enjoyed great wealth, partly because his wife was an heiress of Sir Rowland Hill, the first Protestant Lord Mayor of London.

== Background and early life ==
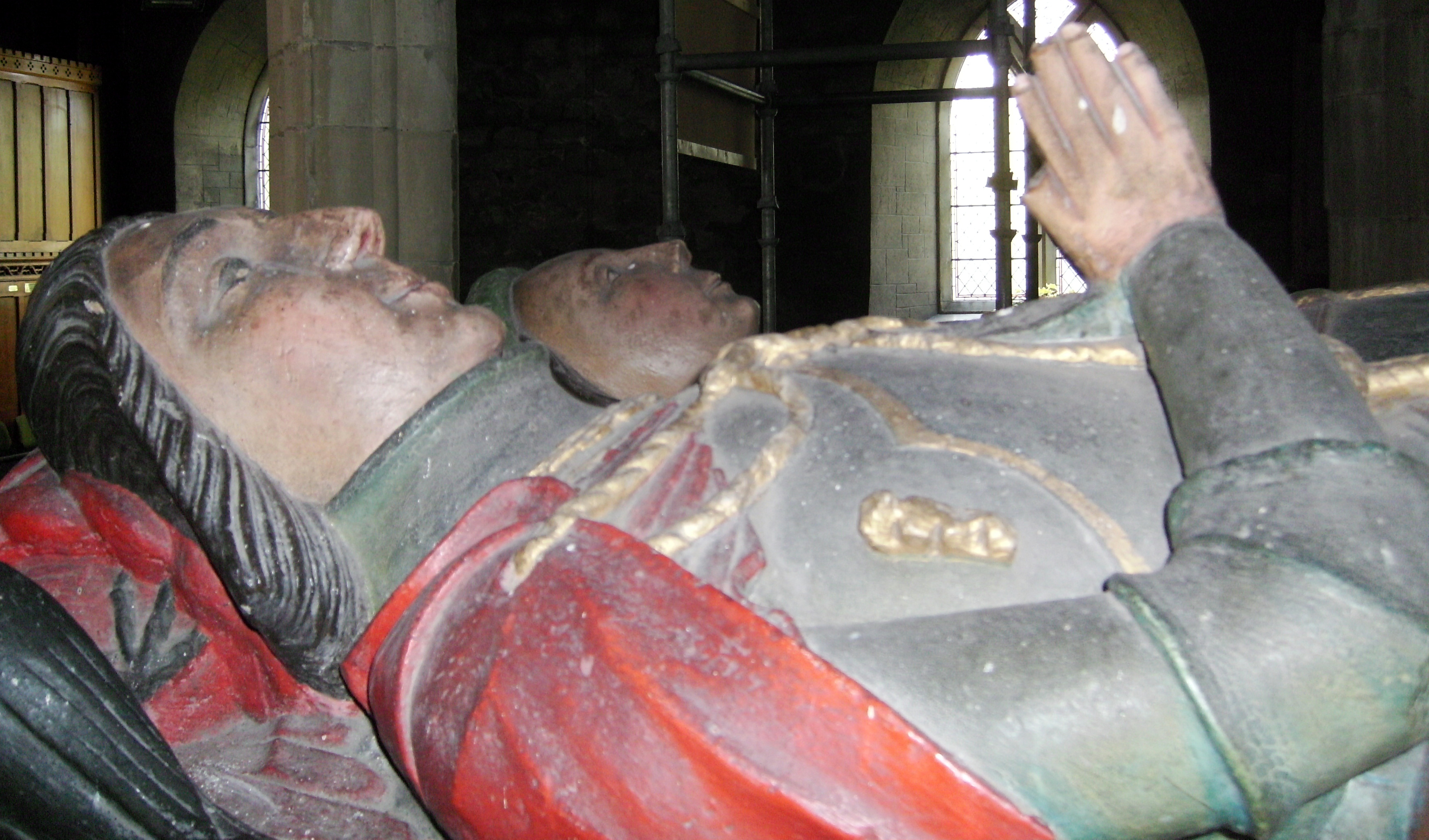
Effigy of Sir Robert Corbet, Reginald's father, in St Bartholomew's church, Moreton Corbet

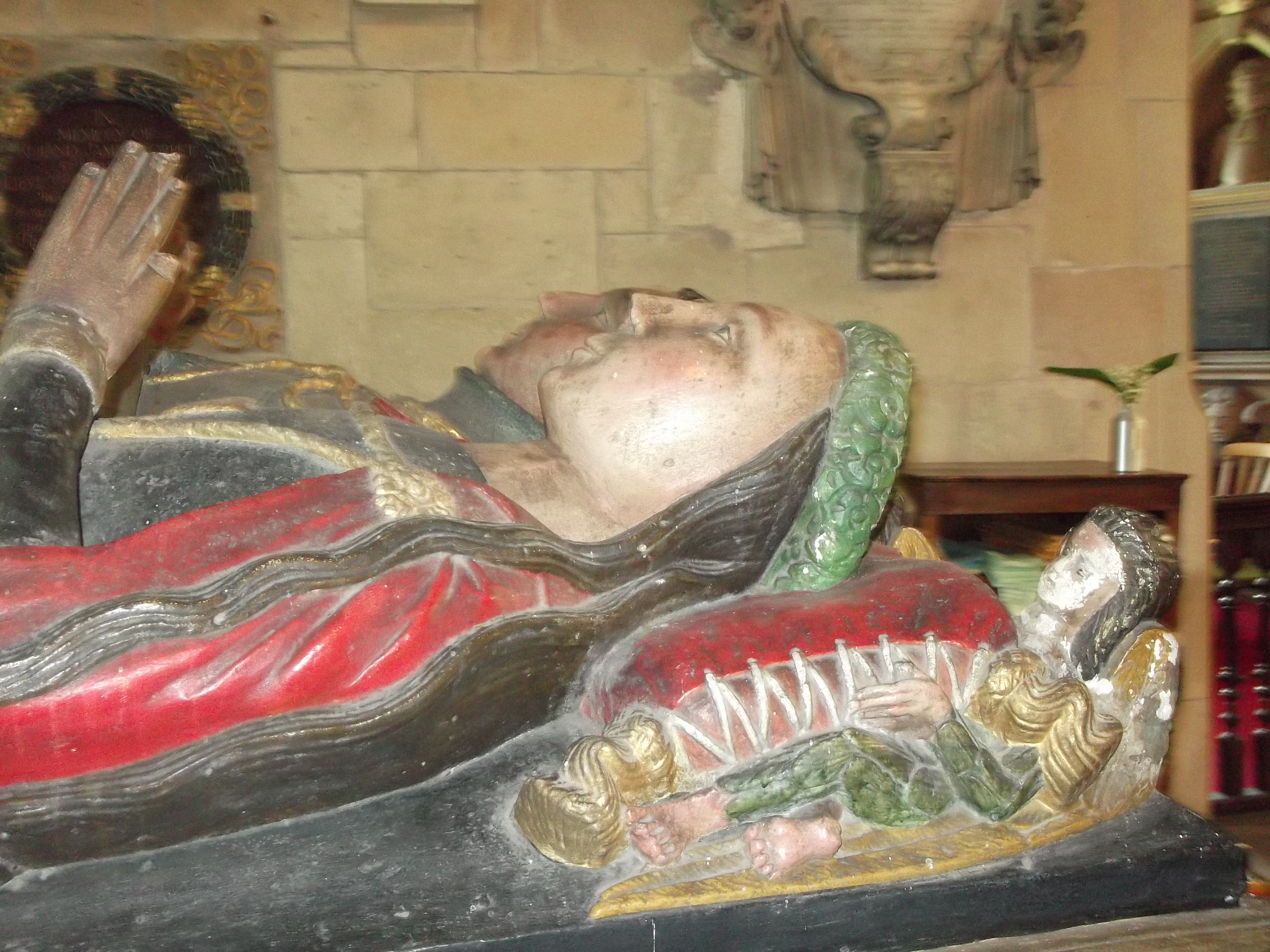
Effigy of Elizabeth Vernon, Reginald Corbet's mother, who long outlived her husband, dying in 1563

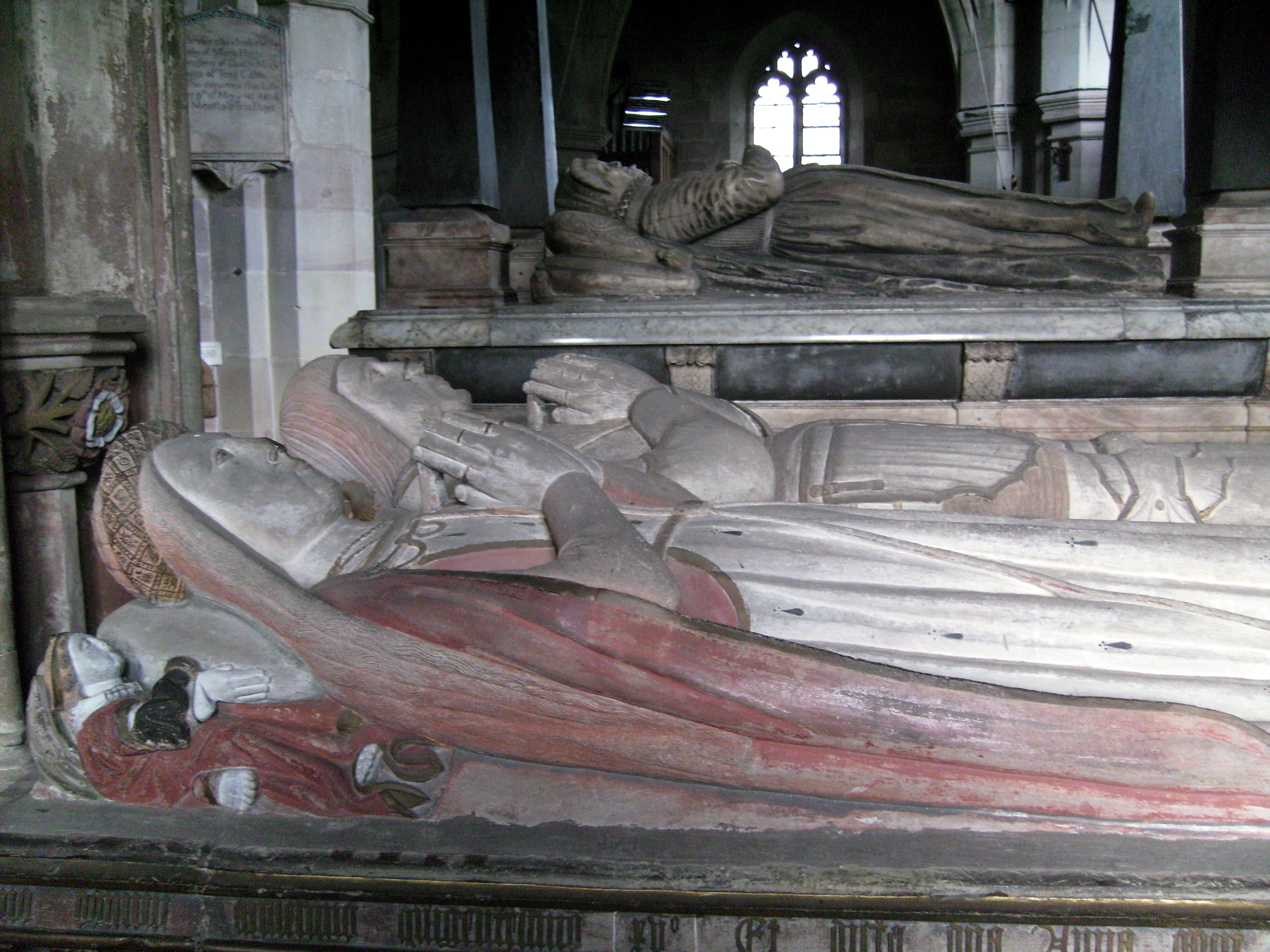
Tomb of Reginald's maternal grandparents, Anne Talbot (died 1494) and Henry Vernon (died 1515) in St Bartholomew's church, Tong, Shropshire

Reginald Corbet was the third son of Sir Robert Corbet (c. 1477–1513) of Moreton Corbet Castle, Shropshire, and Elizabeth Vernon (died 29 March 1563). The Corbet family were landed gentry of Anglo-Norman descent, living in the Shropshire Welsh Marches for centuries, many of whom had represented Shropshire in Parliament.

His mother Elizabeth Vernon was the daughter of Sir Henry Vernon of Haddon Hall and Tong, and Anne Talbot, daughter of John Talbot, Second Earl of Shrewsbury. Elizabeth had close ties with powerful families. Her father had been treasurer to Arthur, Prince of Wales. The Talbots had vast estates in western and northern England.

Reginald had two brothers: Roger Corbet (c. 1501–1538), the heir to Sir Robert's estates, and Richard Corbet (died 1566). Both were to be MPs. However, of the three brothers, only Roger was provided for when Sir Robert died on 11 April 1513: aged about 12, he was to undergo a long wardship before coming into full possession of the Corbet estates in 1522.

Although Sir Robert made generous provision for his four daughters, he never mentioned Richard or Reginald. The will dates from 1509, making it likely that the two younger sons were born after that date, so Reginald was probably little more than an infant when his father died. Both younger sons would have to look elsewhere for advancement. For Richard this meant, initially, the court, while for Reginald it was the law.

== Legal career ==
Reginald was educated at the Middle Temple and called to the bar, although the dates of his early career are not known. He was to be Lent Reader in 1552, by which time he was a distinguished lawyer. He was auditor at the Middle Temple in 1556, assistant to the reader in 1559.

It is likely that Corbett was still at his Inn of Court when he served as MP for Wenlock in 1542. Only from about 1543 do the main outlines of his progress become clear.

In 1543 Corbet served as Feodary for Shropshire, an official of the Court of Wards and Liveries.

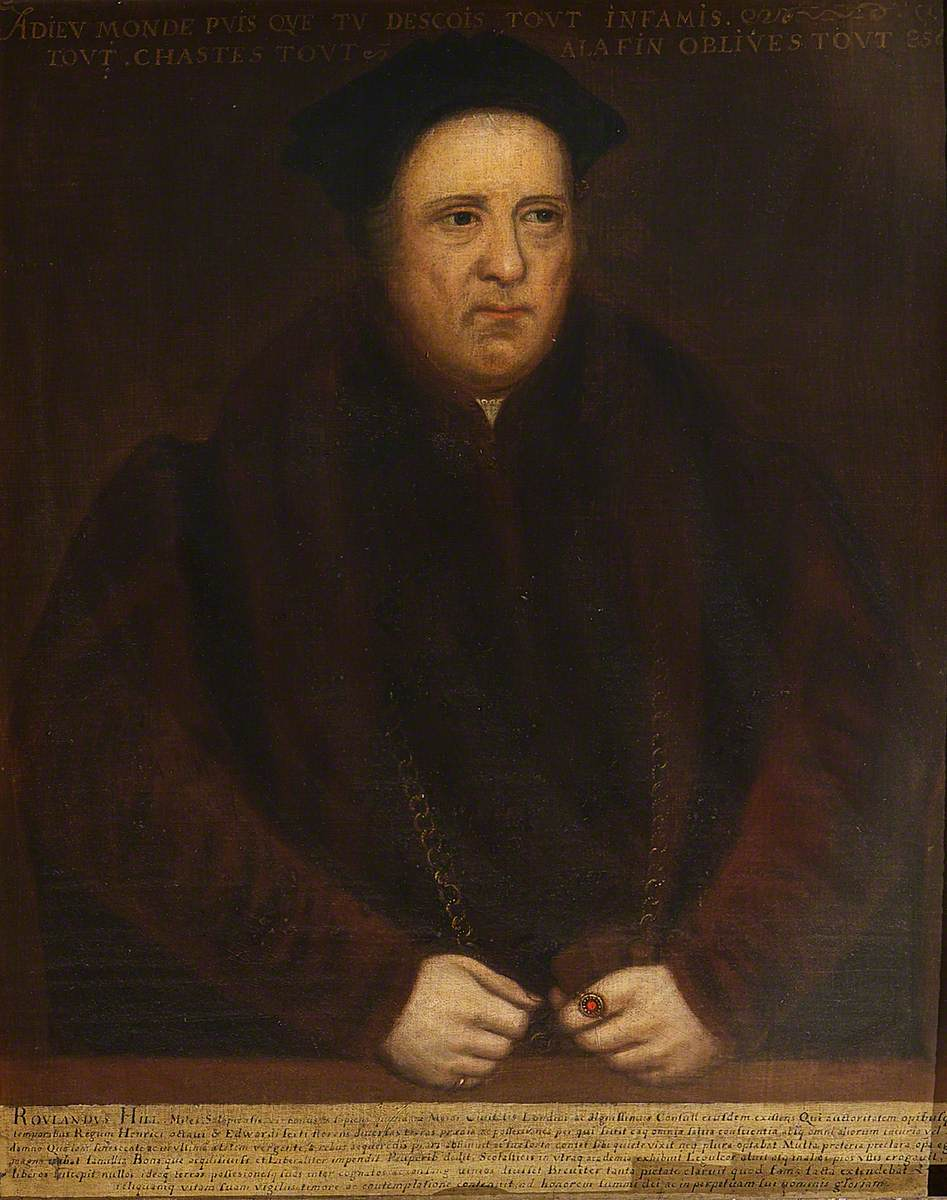
Sir Rowland Hill, Tudor statesman, co-ordinator of the Geneva Bible and possible Shakespeare inspiration. Alliance with him via marriage to his niece advanced the Corbets significantly.

In 1546 he married Alice Gratewood (died 1603), the daughter of John Gratewood (d. 8 August 1570) of Wollerton, Shropshire, and Jane Hill. Alice was a niece of Sir Rowland Hill of Soulton, an official of the Worshipful Company of Mercers who had made immense wealth from the trade with the Netherlands. Hill was the first Protestant Lord Mayor of London, coordinator of the Geneva Bible translation and a possible inspiration for 'Old Sir Rowland' in Shakespeare's As You Like It.

The marriage was immediately followed by a welter of appointments. These can only be explained by Corbet's greatly improved connections.

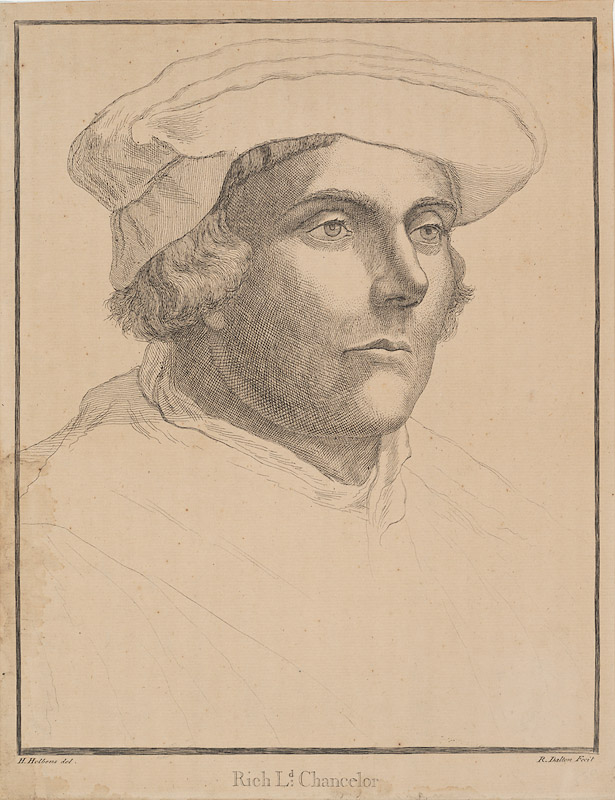
Richard Rich, 1st Baron Rich, Lord Chancellor 1547-52

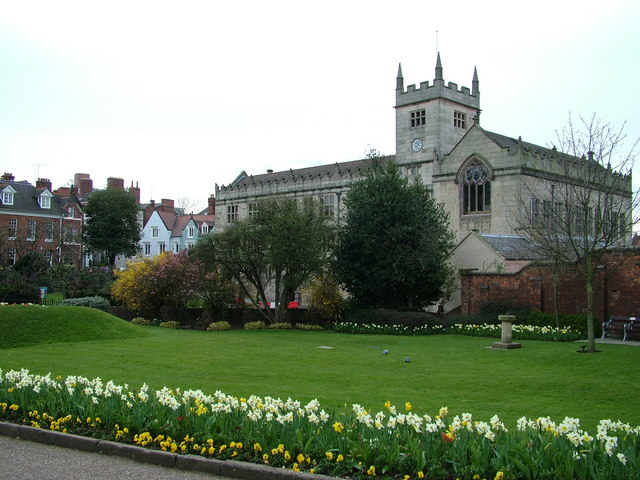
The former Shrewsbury School building, now the town's library

The year after his marriage, Corbet was made Recorder of Shrewsbury, an office he was to hold until 1559. That same year he was also made a justice of the peace for Shropshire and commissioner for chantries in the county, an important post in a year when chantries and colleges were being wound up by the new Protestant regime of Edward VI.

In 1548, he was paid ten shillings "for a supplication exhibited to the Lord Chancellor to obtain a free school." Significantly there was also a receipt for 20 pence to bribe the lord chancellor's servant to win his ear. Augusta Corbet, the family historian, claims Corbet and a group of friends had originated the scheme some years earlier in the reign of Henry VIII, hoping to use proceeds from the dissolution of Shrewsbury Abbey. This time the agitation was to prove ultimately successful and Shrewsbury School was opened in 1552, initially as a distinctly Calvinist institution.

Honorific and lucrative appointments continued through Corbet's life, initially in Shropshire, then in other counties in the Marches and Wales, irrespective of the religious complexion of the regime. He was commissioner for relief in Shropshire in 1550. Under Queen Mary I's Catholic regime, he was appointed to the Quarter Sessions of Gloucestershire, Herefordshire, Shropshire, Worcestershire, Cheshire, Monmouthshire, and the Welsh counties. In 1553, he was made a member of the powerful Council of Wales and the Marches, together with his nephew, Sir Andrew Corbet. Toward the end of Mary's reign, on 6 April 1558, Corbet was made a justice of the Court of Great Sessions in Wales for the Northern Circuit, which consisted of Anglesey, Caernarvonshire and Merionethshire.

In her final months, Mary approved Corbet's call as serjeant-at-law, although the appointment was not confirmed until April 1559, when Elizabeth I's Protestant regime was firmly in control. The following October, Elizabeth made him a justice of the king's bench, necessitating resignation from the recordership at Shrewsbury, which he completed on 27 December.

His work as a justice was distinguished, with colleagues commending his summings up, but not prolonged, as he died in 1566.

== Member of parliament ==
Corbet was elected MP for Much Wenlock for the parliament of 1542, apparently while he was still resident at the Middle Temple. The electoral return was in Latin, and he was listed second in order of precedence to the other member, William Blount, uncle of Henry VIII's illegitimate son, Henry FitzRoy, 1st Duke of Richmond and Somerset. The breadth of Much Wenlock's franchise is obscure, but local gentry interests, like the Blounts, Corbets and Lacons, seem to have played a large part in the election, and the Diocese of Lichfield had also tried to exercise influence. In these circumstances, it is unlikely Corbet encountered great difficulty in securing election, although he did not sit in the parliament of 1545.

In 1547 Corbet was sent to parliament by the Borough of Shrewsbury, which had just appointed him as recorder. Shrewsbury was an ancient royal borough and its MPs were frequently men who occupied some other civic office. However, Corbet was the first recorder of the borough elected to the House of Commons. Corbet was returned as first member, together with John Evans, a staunch Catholic from Wales, who had been appointed clerk to the borough in the previous year. The parliament was long-lived by Tudor standards, lasting until April 1552. Nothing is known about Corbet's part in it, except that he successfully requested leave of absence in its last month to serve as Lent reader at the Middle Temple.

Corbet was not returned to the parliament of March 1553, the second and last of Edward VI's reign. The reasons are unknown. John Dudley, First Duke of Northumberland was the power in the land and he was particularly zealous in securing the return of his supporters to that parliament, although it is unclear why he would want to block the election of Corbet, who seems to have been broadly sympathetic to the Protestant faction. It is possibly relevant that Corbet's pay was lower than the former incumbent, so he may have been conducting a campaign of his own. On his return to parliament in October 1553, the first parliament of Mary's reign, the borough resolved that he should be an MP: "at this time and at all times hereafter so long as he is recorder... if he will take it upon him, for that it is supposed to be incident to his... office of recordership". It is unclear whether Corbet himself instigated this motion and it was certainly untrue that Shrewsbury recorders had previously sat as MPs ex officio. However, some boroughs did have such a tradition. Among Corbet's contemporaries, fellow Salopian Robert Broke was recorder and MP for London, where the practice seems to have originated, while Richard Morgan occupied both offices for Gloucester, another important borough in the Marches.

Corbet's is not one of the 60 names later marked as "they which stood for the true religion" in that parliament: these were the decided Protestants who resisted Mary's restoration of Catholicism from the outset. However, when returned to the parliament of 1555, he joined the cautious opposition to the regime, voting with his nephew, Sir Andrew, against an important government bill.

== Marriage and family ==
Reginald Corbet married Alice Gratewood, daughter of John Gratewood of Wollerton, at Hodnet on 23 August 1546.

Her uncle, Sir Rowland Hill, published the Geneva Bible and may have inspired the character 'Old Sir Rowland' in Shakespeare's As You Like It. He died without issue in 1561. He had used some of his immense wealth to buy estates in his native Shropshire and the neighbouring counties, most of them on the market because of the Dissolution of the Monasteries. These he left to his two nieces, wider family and for charitable purposes.

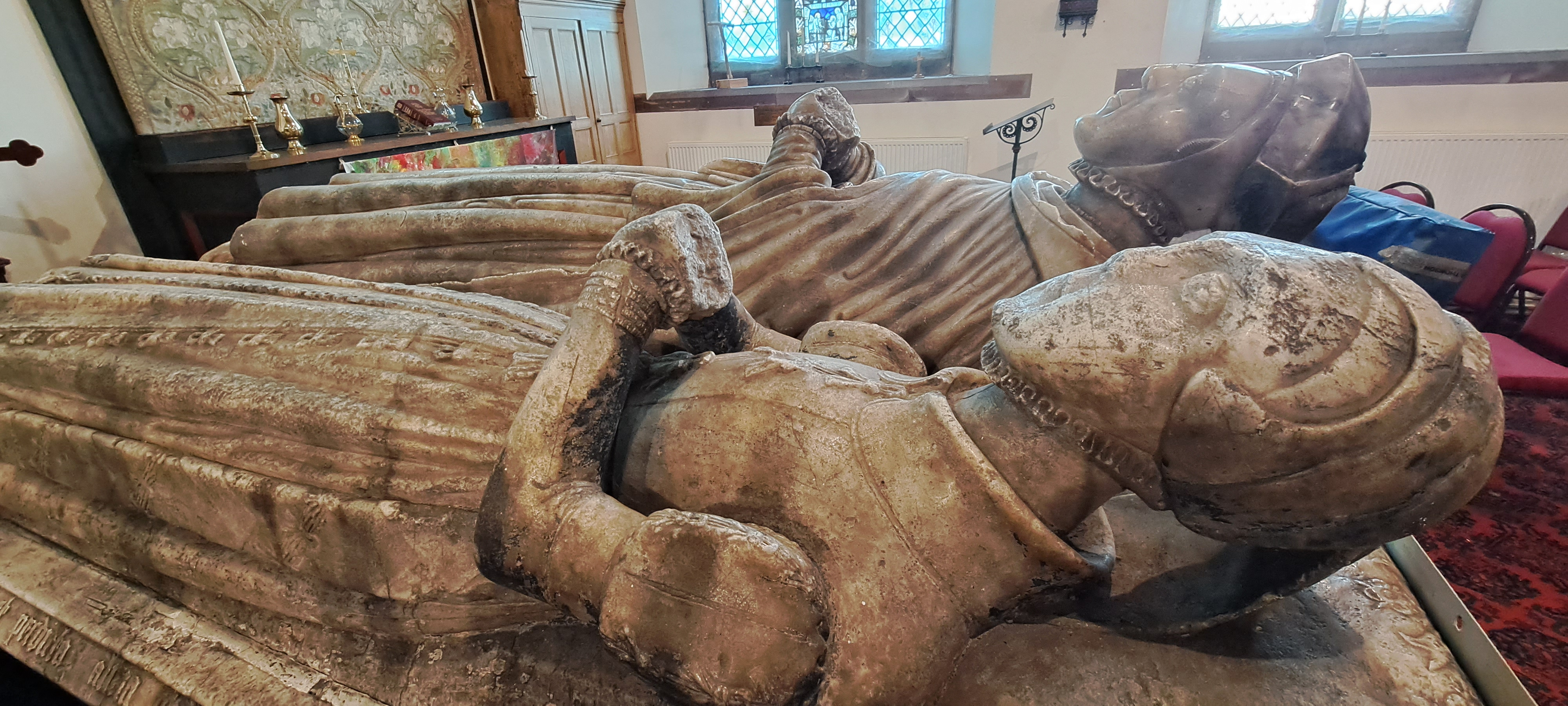
The remarkably fine monument to the family of Reginald and Alice Corbet in Stoke on Tern

Alice inherited large estates that made herself and Reginald Corbet wealthy and secure for the latter part of their lives. On Alice's death, the estates were listed as the manors of Drayton, Adderley, Stoke on Tern, Hales, Almington and Blore, the village of Child's Ercall and granges at Cliffe, Tern Hill, Burnhill and Cheethill.

Corbet and Alice had six sons and five daughters. There is an alabaster monument to their family in the church at Stoke on Tern.

- Andrew predeceased his father.
- Robert also predeceased his father.
- Rowland died while at the grammar school in Market Drayton founded by Sir Rowland Hill.
- Francis also predeceased his father.
- Richard (died c. 1601), Reginald Corbet's heir, married Anne Bromley, daughter of Lord Chancellor Thomas Bromley

- Their son, Sir John Corbet, 1st Baronet, of Stoke upon Tern was a prominent opponent of Charles I's absolutist policies in the 1620s and sided with Parliament in the English Civil War.

- Peter married Elizabeth Pigott, daughter of Thomas Pigott of Chetwynd, Shropshire.
- Elizabeth married Robert Arden (son of Edward Arden) both of the Arden family of Park Hall, Castle Bromwich and cousins of Shakespeare's mother Mary Arden.
- Mary married Francis Newton of Heightley in the parish of Chirbury, Francis' grandfather Sir Peter Newton was private secretary to Prince Arthur eldest son of Henry VII, and built himself a fine mansion in Shrewsbury, which became the Shrewsbury headquarters of the Council of the Marches.
- Anne married first Edward Mytton of Halston, then Sir William Leighton of Plaish, who had as a son Sir William Leighton Jr
- Margaret married Sir Humphrey Lee of Acton Burnell and Langley and Coton, near Alveley. They had as a son Sir Richard Lee, 2nd Baronet a prominent Royalist
- Jane

== Death ==
Augusta Corbett gives Reginald's year of death as 1569, but the date of probate makes this impossible and 19 November 1566, is now the accepted date, only about four months after the death of his brother, Richard. He had made his will the previous year and it was proved on 22 January 1567.

Richard was his heir. However, as Reginald owed his good fortune mainly to his wife's inheritance, he recognised in his will and testament:

"And as concerning any devise to be made of my lands, I can make none, for my wife is joint-purchaser with me, and so that I remit wholly to her and to her provision for our children after such plat and devise as I have drawn, and remaineth in my coffer." He gave a gelding to Sir Andrew and another gelding, together with his crossbow and a parcel-gilt silver cup, to Robert Corbet (died 1583), Sir Andrew's son, and asked them both to be good to Alice. He gave a gelding also to his brother-in-law, William Gratewood, forgiving him a debt of £14. He left the very large sum of £400 for the marriage of his daughter Elizabeth, then still single. He was generous to his servants, giving each a full year's pay and up to an extra year's free board and lodging while they looked for employment. Alice was made the sole executrix.
