= Bagthorpe =

Bagthorpe may refer to:

- Bagthorpe, Norfolk, England
- Bagthorpe, Nottinghamshire, England
- The Bagthorpe Saga, a series of books by Helen Cresswell

== See also ==
- Bagthorpe with Barmer, a civil parish in Norfolk, England
- William Babthorpe (1489/90–1555), English politician
- Bugthorpe, East Riding of Yorkshire, England
