= Roger Corbet =

16th-century English politician

Roger Corbet (c.1501–1538) was an English politician and landowner of the Tudor Period. A member of the Shropshire landed gentry, he represented the Borough of Truro in the English Reformation Parliament.

== Background and early life ==
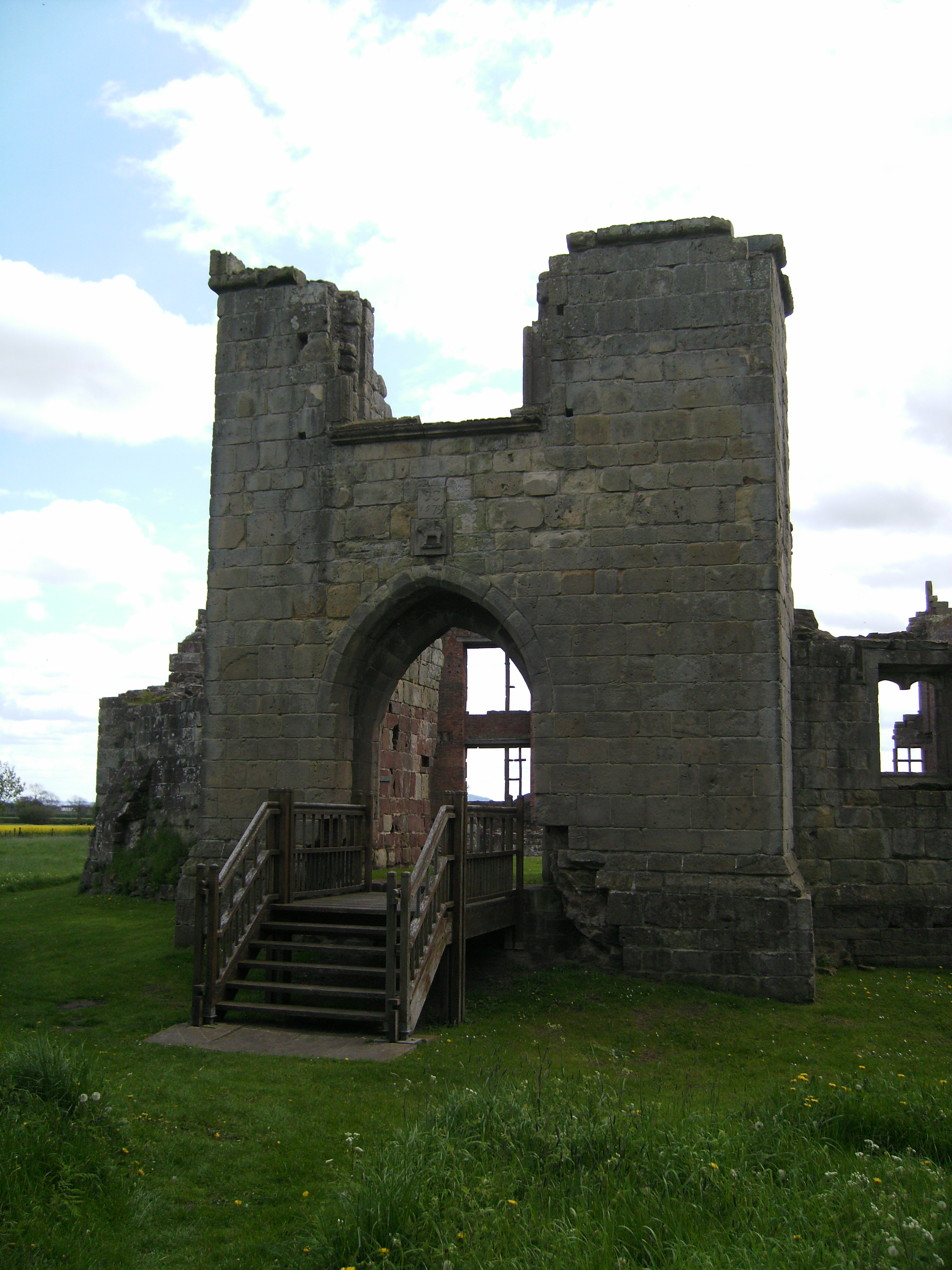
The medieval gatehouse of Moreton Corbet castle, part of the original fortress, although restored by Roger's son and heir, Sir Andrew Corbet.

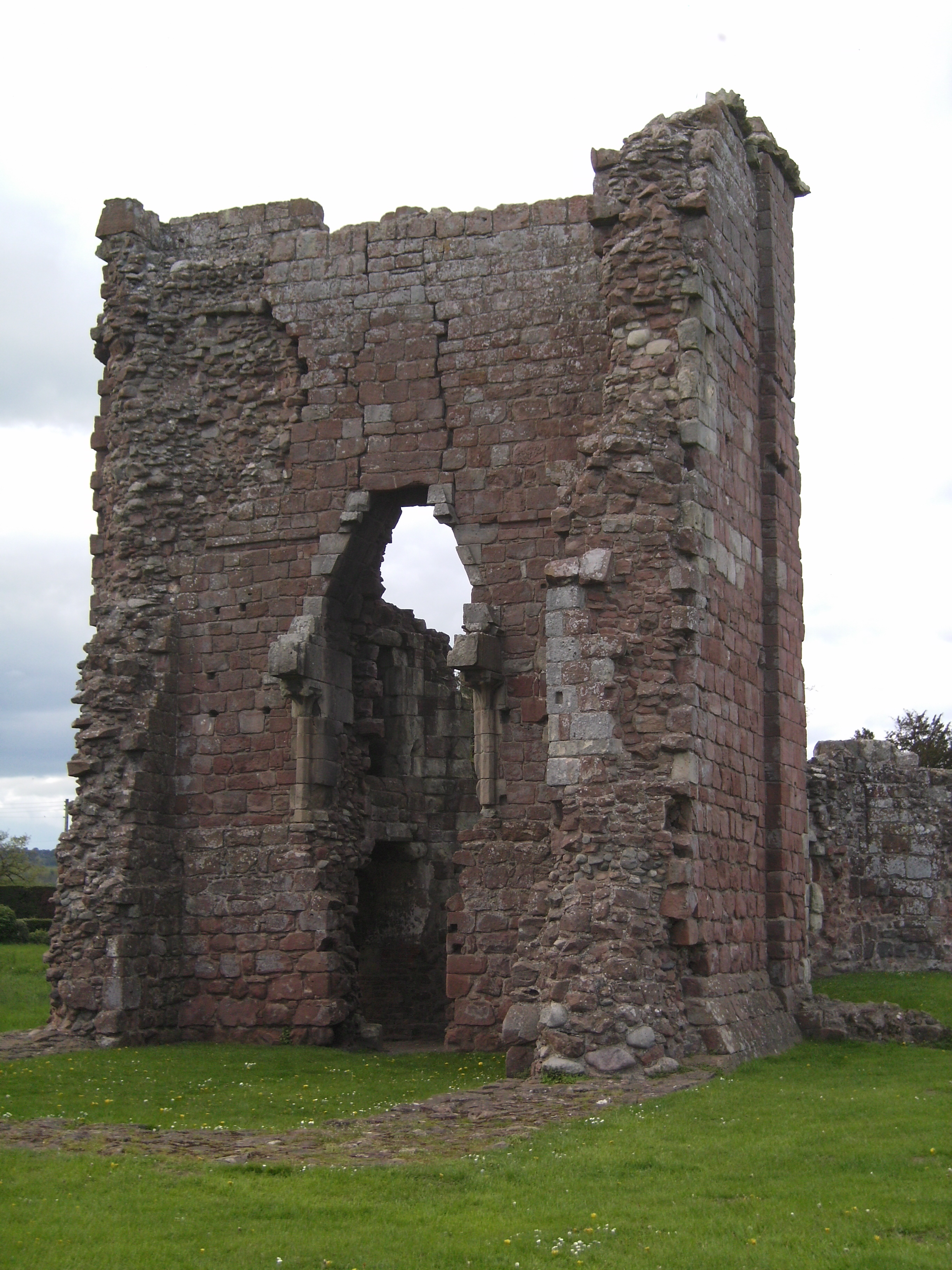
Remains of the great Norman keep at Moreton Corbet, which was still the main residential building in Roger corbet's time. Only in Elizabeth's reign did the Corbets and most marcher families feel safe enough to construct more domestic buildings.

Roger Corbet was the son of Robert Corbet (c.1477–1513) of Moreton Corbet, Shropshire, and Elizabeth Vernon (died 29 March 1563), daughter of Sir Henry Vernon of Haddon Hall and Tong by Anne Talbot, daughter of John Talbot, 2nd Earl of Shrewsbury. Elizabeth's father had been treasurer to Arthur Tudor, the Prince of Wales and Henry VIII's elder brother. Her mother's family were among the most powerful in the country, with large estates in Shropshire and Staffordshire. Roger had two brothers, both MPs: Richard Corbet represented Shropshire in the parliaments of 1558 and 1563, while Reginald Corbet, a distinguished lawyer, Serjeant-at-law and Justice of the King's Bench, represented Much Wenlock in 1542 and Shrewsbury in the parliaments of 1545, October 1553 and 1555.

Sir Robert also had four surviving daughters by Elizabeth: Jane, Joan or Anne, Mary and Dorothy. All married into the local landed gentry.

Sir Robert died on 11 April 1513. His will made generous provision for his daughters, guaranteeing them their keep and 100 marks each their marriages, but left nothing specific for Richard and Reginald. Roger was his heir and was to inherit all his estates and half of his cattle and household goods, together with "my best salt with the covering, my best piece of silver with the covering, my best goblet and half my spoons."

Family gallery

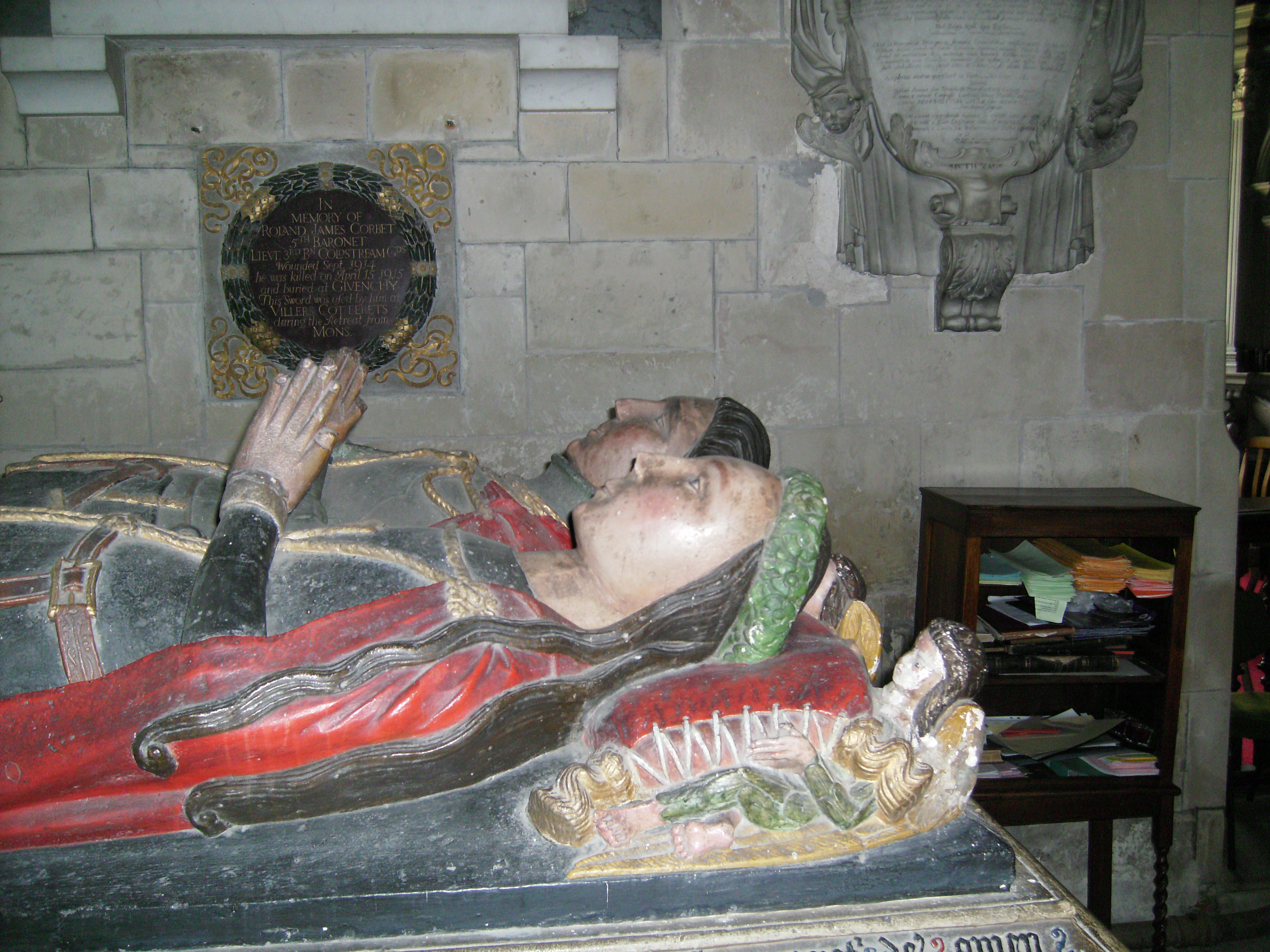
Tomb of Sir Robert Corbet (died 1513) and his wife, Elizabeth Vernon, in St Bartholomew's church, Moreton Corbet.

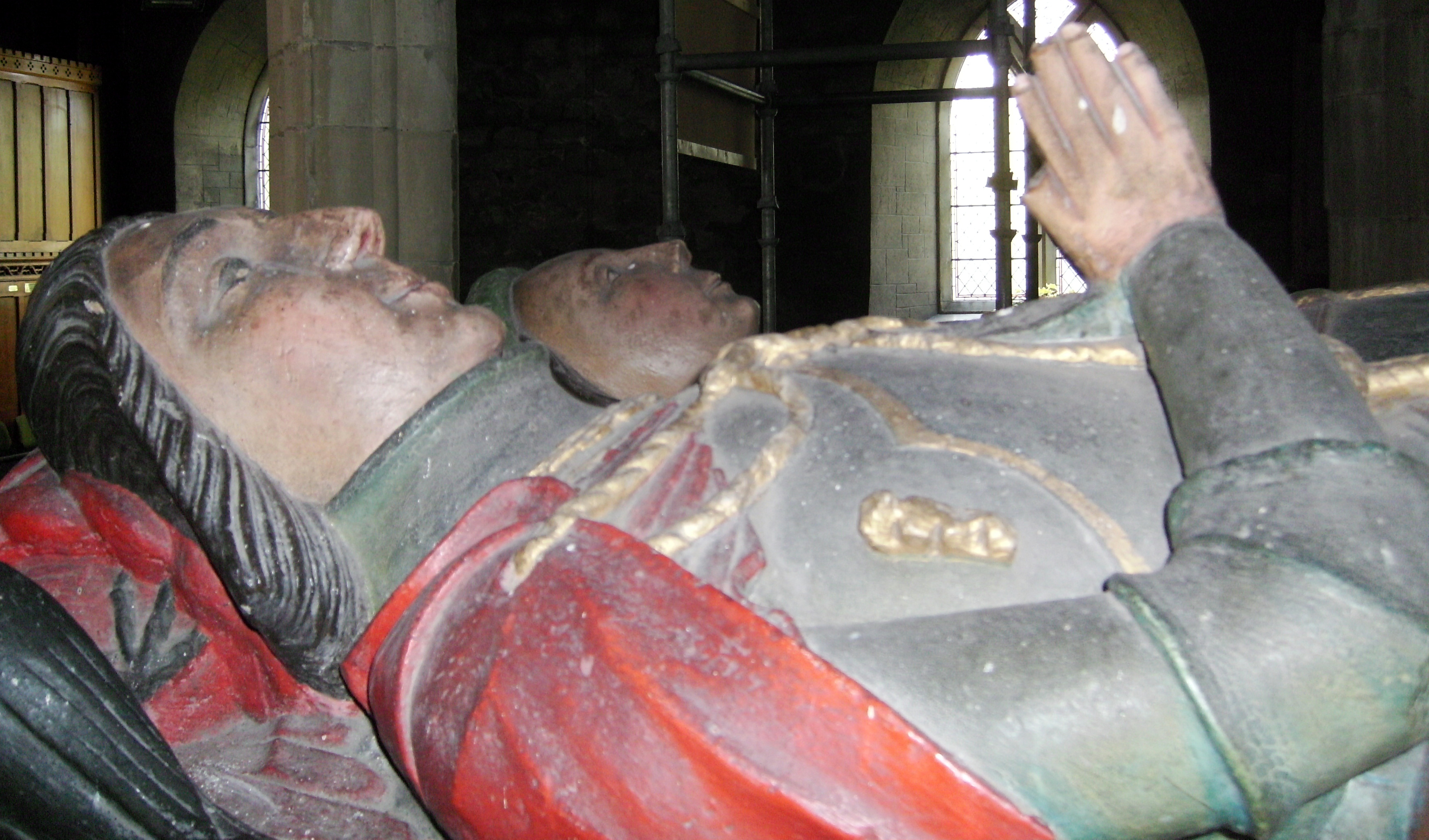
Effigy of Sir Robert Corbet, Roger Corbet's father.

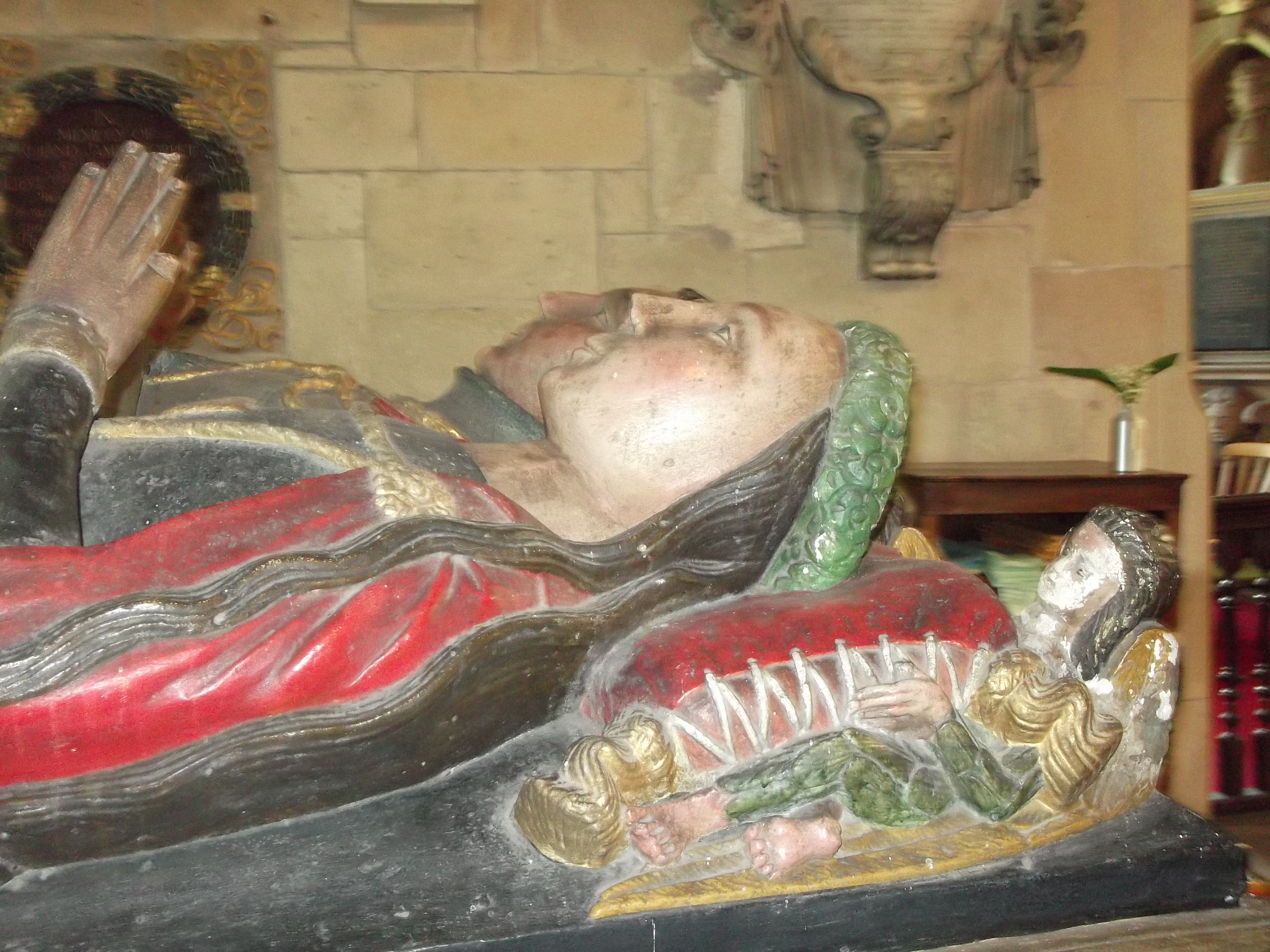
Effigy of Elizabeth Vernon, Roger Corbet's mother, who long outlived her husband, dying in 1563.

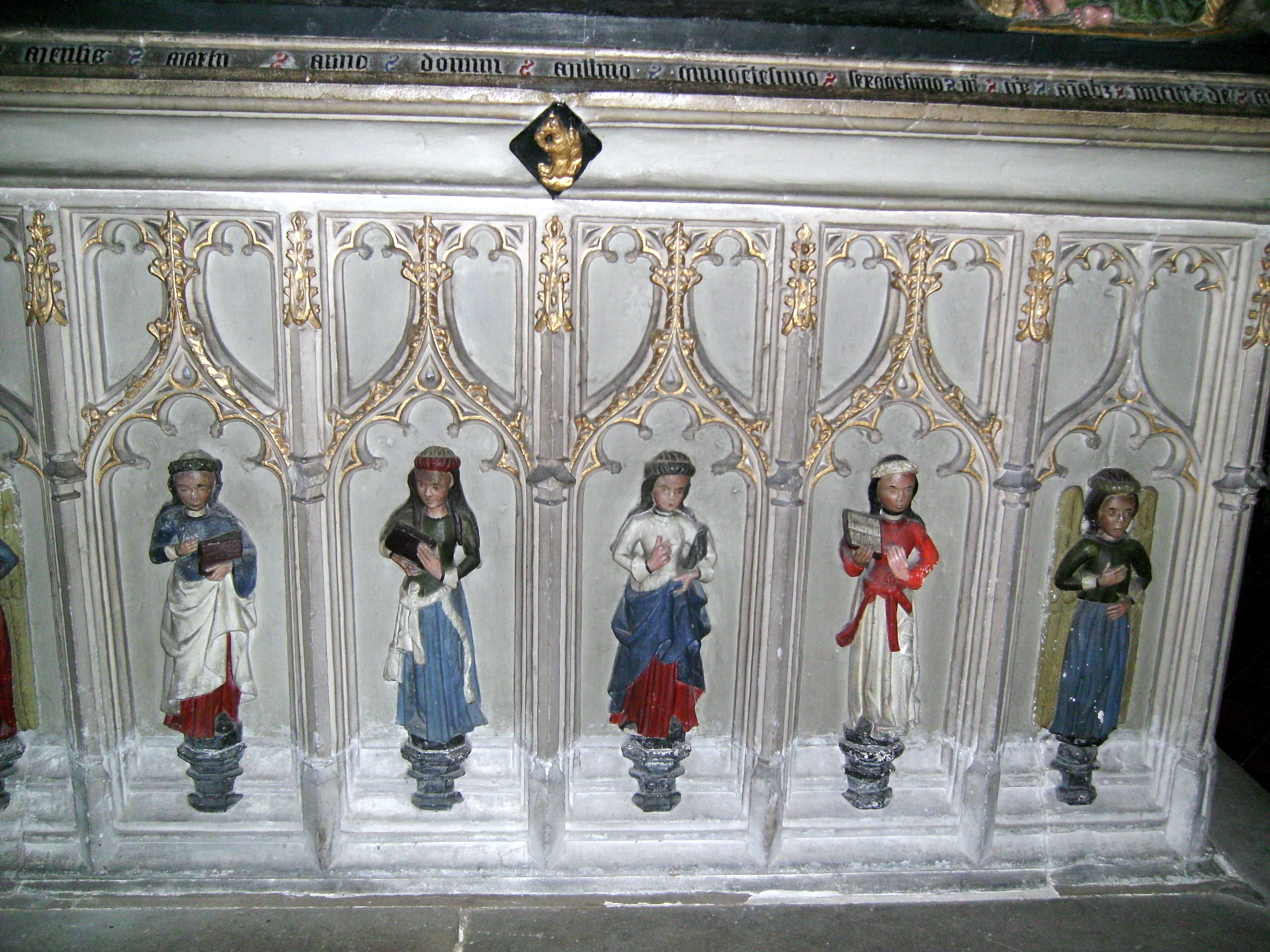
Figures on south side of Corbet/Vernon tomb, including sisters of Roger Corbet.

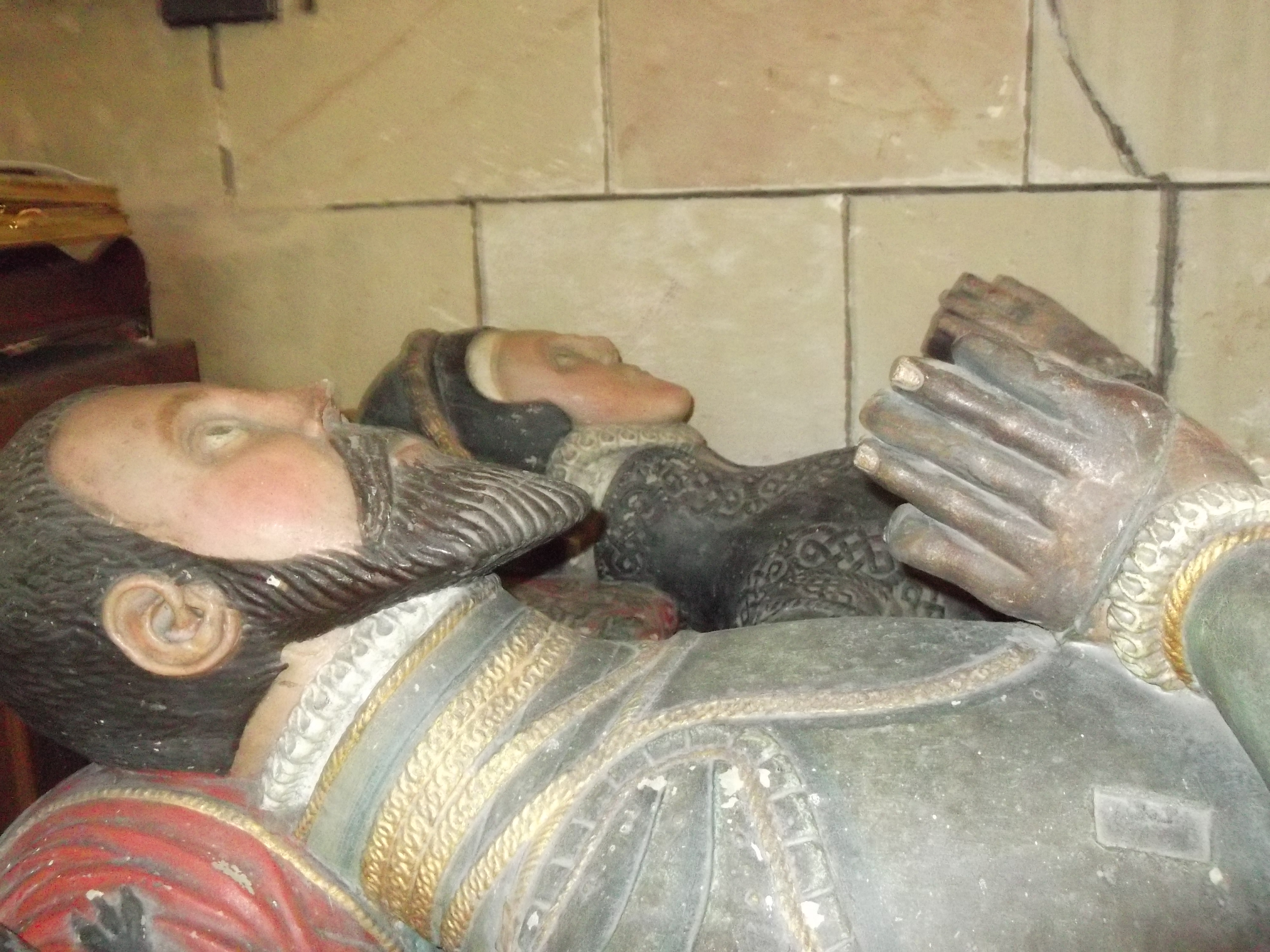
Effigies of Richard Corbet, one of Roger's brothers, and Margaret Savile.

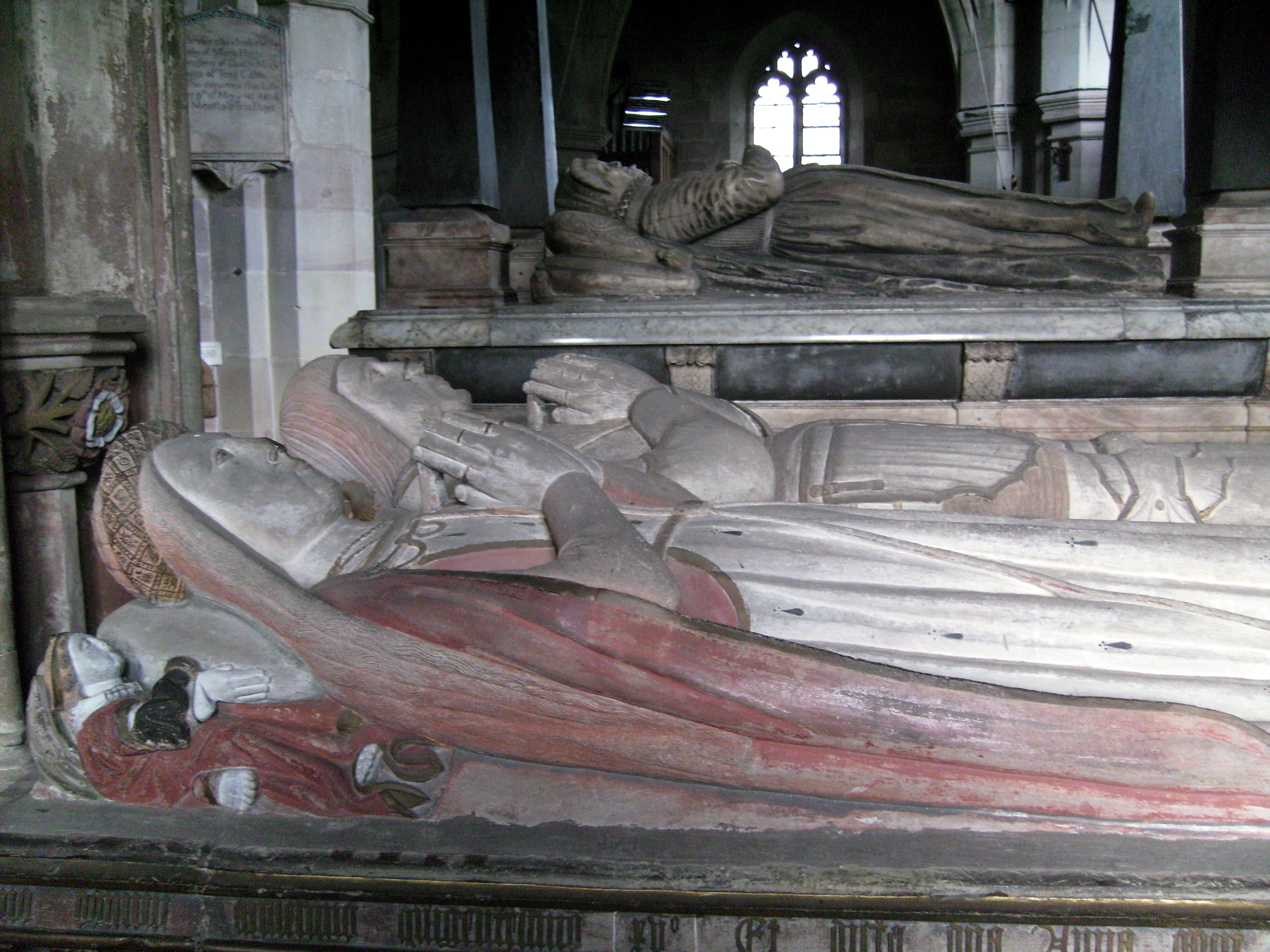
Tomb of Roger's maternal grandparents, Anne Talbot (died 1494) and Henry Vernon (died 1515) in St Bartholomew's church, Tong, Shropshire.

== Wardship and marriage ==
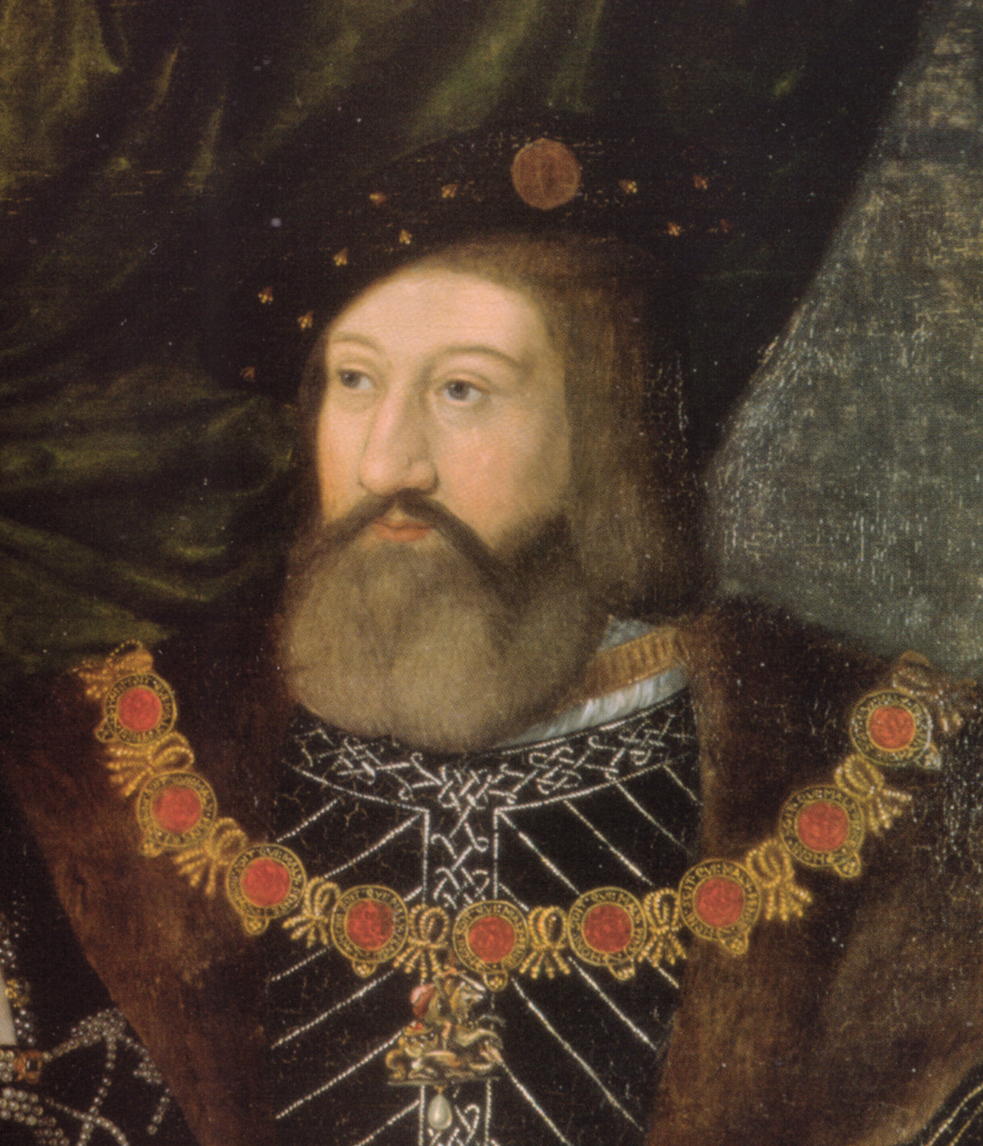
Charles Brandon, 1st Duke of Suffolk, the King's brother-in-law. detail of a double wedding portrait attributed to Jan Gossaert, c. 1516. Brandon was granted the wardship of Roger Corbet after the death of Sir Robert.

Roger Corbet was about twelve when his father died and his wardship became a commodity to be sold by the Crown. The History of Parliament avers that his wardship was bought by Charles Brandon, 1st Duke of Suffolk, a close friend of Henry VIII, and that it was probably he who arranged Roger's marriage to Anne Windsor, the daughter of Andrew Windsor, 1st Baron Windsor. The family historian Augusta Corbet documents the Brandon wardship. There is also a record of Brandon appointing George Onslow as steward of the Shropshire estates in February 1514. However, Brandon cannot have held the wardship for long.

It is known that Andrew Windsor himself bought the wardship from the executors of John de Vere, 13th Earl of Oxford, probably in 1514, because a legal wrangle arose 42 years later between Windsor's executors and Robert Wingfield, son of Oxford's executor, Humphrey Wingfield. The issue is clouded by the fact that Oxford died a month before Sir Robert Corbet, so can never have been Roger's guardian. The connection seems to be Humphry Wingfield himself, who was Brandon's cousin, and a lawyer for both him and the de Veres. The details are obscure but he appears to have engineered the transfer of the wardship to Windsor via the estate of the earl of Oxford. His son claimed that the payment of 950 marks was never completed, to his own detriment, and Windsor's executors could not produce a receipt. However, they denounced Robert Wingfield's claims as merely vexatious, "contrary to all right, equity & good conscience", in a complaint to Nicholas Heath, the Lord Chancellor. Both sides, however, accepted that the purchase agreement was between Andrew Windsor and the earl's executors.

Having acquired the wardship and marriage of Roger Corbet, Andrew Windsor arranged his marriage to his own daughter, Anne, by 1522. Windsor was very rich because he was deeply embedded in the mechanisms of power at Court. As Keeper of the Great Wardrobe to Henry VII of England, he had responsibility for an annual budget running into thousands of pounds and was an important part of the network of his cousin, the notorious Edmund Dudley. He had survived Dudley's fall to continue in office under Henry VIII. He therefore had influence he could use on his son-in-law's behalf.

== Landowner ==
Corbet obtained livery, i.e. took full possession, of his inheritance on 22 October 1522.

Corbet's seat was Moreton Corbet Castle, Shropshire. The Corbets buried their dead in the parish church of St Bartholomew, just to the north of the castle.

In Buckinghamshire he had the manors of Cublington and Linslade (now in Bedfordshire. Half of Cublington had been inherited by Roger's grandmother, Elizabeth Lucy. The Corbets seem to have acquired the other half as a result of its successive owners being attainted during the Wars of the Roses and saw off a legal attempt to regain it by Nicholas Vaux, 1st Baron Vaux of Harrowden in 1500. Roger was able to settle it on himself and his wife in 1525. Linslade was another former Lucy property that descended with Cublington. Roger also inherited land from the Arcedekne family in Cornwall, including an estate near Truro.

In Warwickshire Corbet held the manor of Harborough Magna, acquired by his great-grandfather, also called Roger. In Hertfordshire he held Wigginton, part of the Lucy inheritance.

Corbet became prominent both in Shropshire, his family's traditional focus, and in Buckinghamshire, where Windsor was particularly influential. He occupied the customary offices of county gentry. He was pricked to be High Sheriff of Shropshire in 1529. In 1532 he was made a justice of the Peace in Buckinghamshire and in 1535 High Sheriff of Bedfordshire and Buckinghamshire. In 1537 he was one of the three nominated for Sheriff but he was not selected. In November 1538 he was selected to be High Sheriff of Shropshire for the second time, but he died the following month.

The three sons of Sir Robert Corbet are all shown armed on his tomb. The History of Parliament points out that Roger seems not to have gone to war: at least there is no indication that he took part in Suffolk's French campaign of 1523, part of the Italian War of 1521–26 – a campaign in which he might have been expected to participate. It appears that in 1536 he was summoned to take part in the suppression of the Lincolnshire Rebellion, but a countermanding letter arrived before he could respond, as the rebels had already been defeated. Lacking military experience and dying young, Corbet never achieved a knighthood.

== Member of Parliament ==
It is possible that Corbet sat in the House of Commons of England in the parliament of 1523, the first called after the end of his wardship. However, the records of the membership of this parliament are largely lost.

In 1529 he was elected as first member for Truro, the borough nearest his main Cornish estate. His colleague was John Thomas, a Yeoman of the Guard who was prominent at Court. Truro was a small town, although election returns of the period seem to indicate a wide electorate. In 1533 Thomas Cromwell noted a vacancy at Truro, but this is thought to be a mistake for Lostwithiel, the next constituency on his list. The English Reformation Parliament elected in 1529 was unusually long-lived. It dealt with Henry VIII's marriage and succession problems and all their consequences: the Statute in Restraint of Appeals, which broke with Rome, the Acts of Supremacy, the Suppression of Religious Houses Act 1535. At the Parliament's dissolution in 1536, the king asked electors to return the same members, wherever possible, to continue the work. So Corbet probably sat again for Truro in the parliament of 1536, which lasted for less than six weeks.

== Death ==
When Corbet made his will on 27 November 1538, he declared that he was already "sick of body but whole of mind." He provided for his wife, Anne, whom he made his sole executrix, and each of his children, as well as confirming the 100 marks for his sister Mary, as she was still unmarried. He provided for funeral garb for 13 poor men and 13 poor women, as well as for thirty gold rings, marked RC, to be given as mementoes to his friends. He asked that his "evidences" or personal effects from Linslade and from his room on the Strand to be brought to Moreton Corbet. He directed that his servants should receive their full year's wages or be compensated with his horses in lieu. Andrew, his eldest son, was still only 16, and he feared he too would endure a long wardship.

"I require and humbly beseech my supervisors and my executrix, tenderly lamenting the captive bondage of wardship, to consult together, pondering the readiest ways how to redeem my heir out of the thraldom and bondage of wardship, for whose marriage I was offered one thousand marks"

Assuming the thousand marks materialised, he urged them to set aside the very large sum of three hundred marks each for his daughter's marriages. It was not to be: Andrew was forced into wardship, as his mother's will attests.

Roger Corbet died on 20 December 1538.

== Marriage and family ==
Roger Corbet married by 1522 Anne Windsor, daughter of Sir Andrew Windsor, later 1st Lord Windsor, and of Elizabeth Blount. Anne outlived him by about twelve years. They had at least four sons and four daughters, all of the sons and two of the daughters surviving them.

- Sir Andrew Corbet was Roger's eldest son and heir. A distinguished soldier and administrator, he was twice MP for Shropshire
- Walter Corbet, who died of the plague in 1583, sine prole, along with his nephew, Andrew's son, Robert, who was visiting him in London.
- Robert Corbet of Stanwardine.
- Jerome Corbet, who was MP for Bridgnorth
- Margaret Corbet, who married Francis Palmes of Lindley.

- Francis Palmes, their son, was an Elizabethan politician and MP for Knaresborough

- Elizabeth Corbet

Political offices
Preceded by Sir John St John	High Sheriff of Bedfordshire and Buckinghamshire; 1535–1536	Succeeded by Thomas Longueville
