= Francis Palmes (died 1613) =

English politician

Sir Francis Palmes (c. 1554 – 30 March 1613) was an English politician.

== Early life and education ==
Francis Palmes was the son and heir of Sir Francis Palmes of Lindley and Margaret, the daughter of Roger Corbet of Moreton Corbet Castle, Shropshire, who he succeeded in 1560. He was educated at Magdalen College, Oxford and the Inner Temple in 1575.

== Career ==
Palmes served as Justice of the Peace for the West Riding of Yorkshire from 1582 to 1608. Between 1600 and 1608, he held the same position in Hampshire. Additionally, in 1599, he was appointed as a member of the high commission for the province of York, and from 1600 to 1601, he served as Sheriff of Hampshire. Palmes' career seemed to flourish, possibly due to his legal expertise. Notably, he represented Knaresborough as a Member of Parliament (MP) in 1586.

In 1601, while serving as sheriff, Palmes had the honour of receiving the Queen at Silchester and escorting her to Basingstoke, where she bestowed knighthood upon him. He was married to Mary, the daughter and coheiress of Stephen Hadnall of Lancelevy, and they had six sons and five daughters. Following his passing, his eldest son, Guy Palmes, succeeded him.

== Courtiers at Lancelevy ==
In August 1603 there was plague in England. The royal court moved to Basing House. Francis Palmes entertained courtiers at his house nearby at Lancelevy in Sherfield on Loddon. The party included Lady Anne Clifford, her mother Margaret Clifford, Countess of Cumberland and Elizabeth Bourchier, Countess of Bath, who used Lancelevy as a base to visit Anne of Denmark and Arbella Stuart. One night, riding from Basingstoke to Lancelevy, Anne Clifford saw a comet. The old house has been demolished and a moated site remains.
