= Brian Palmes (died 1519) =

Landowner, justice of the assize and politician

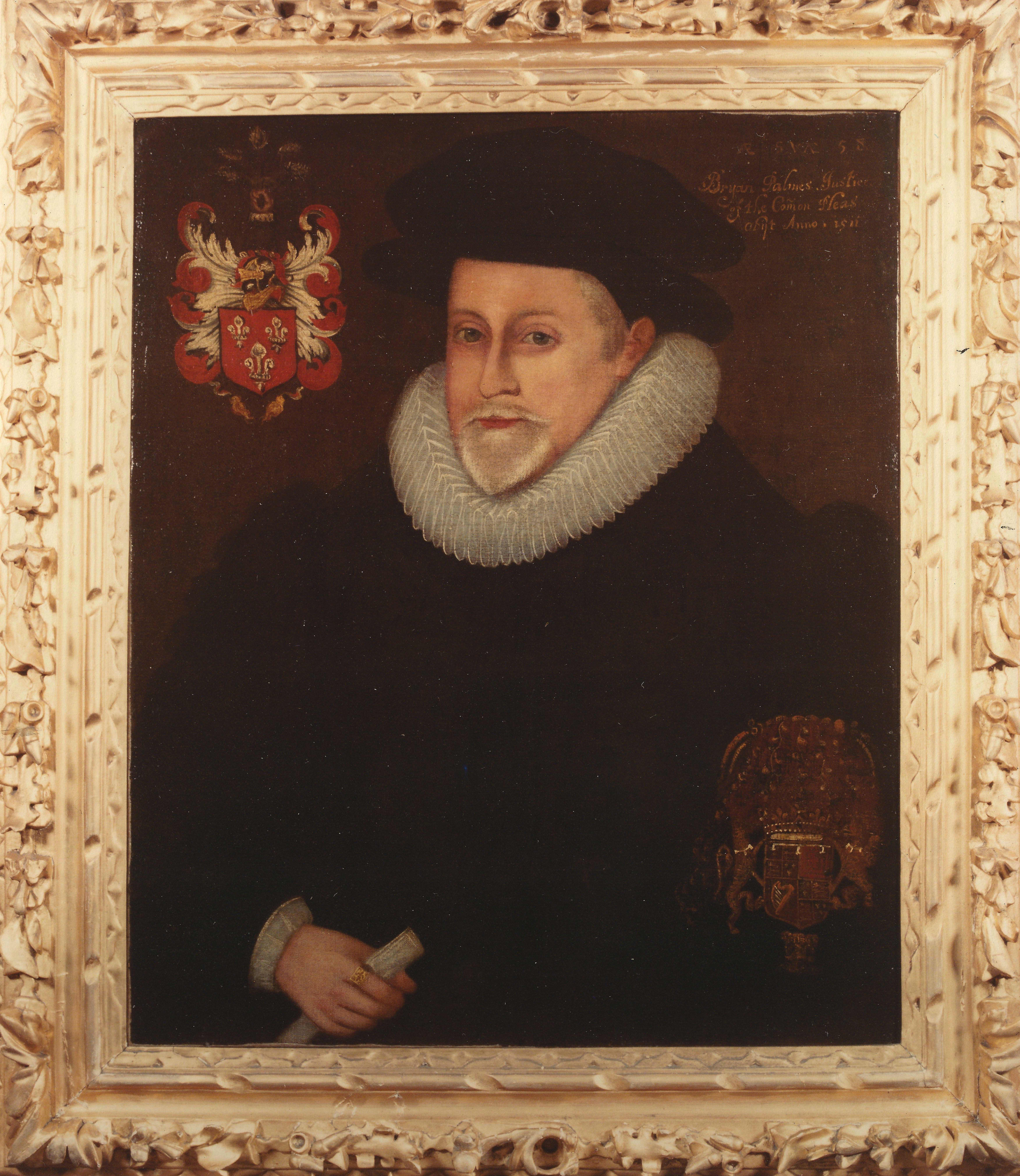
- Born: 1467
- Died: 1519 (aged 51–52)
- Occupation: Politician

Brian Palmes (before 1467–1519) was an English landowner, justice of the assize and politician who sat in the House of Commons.

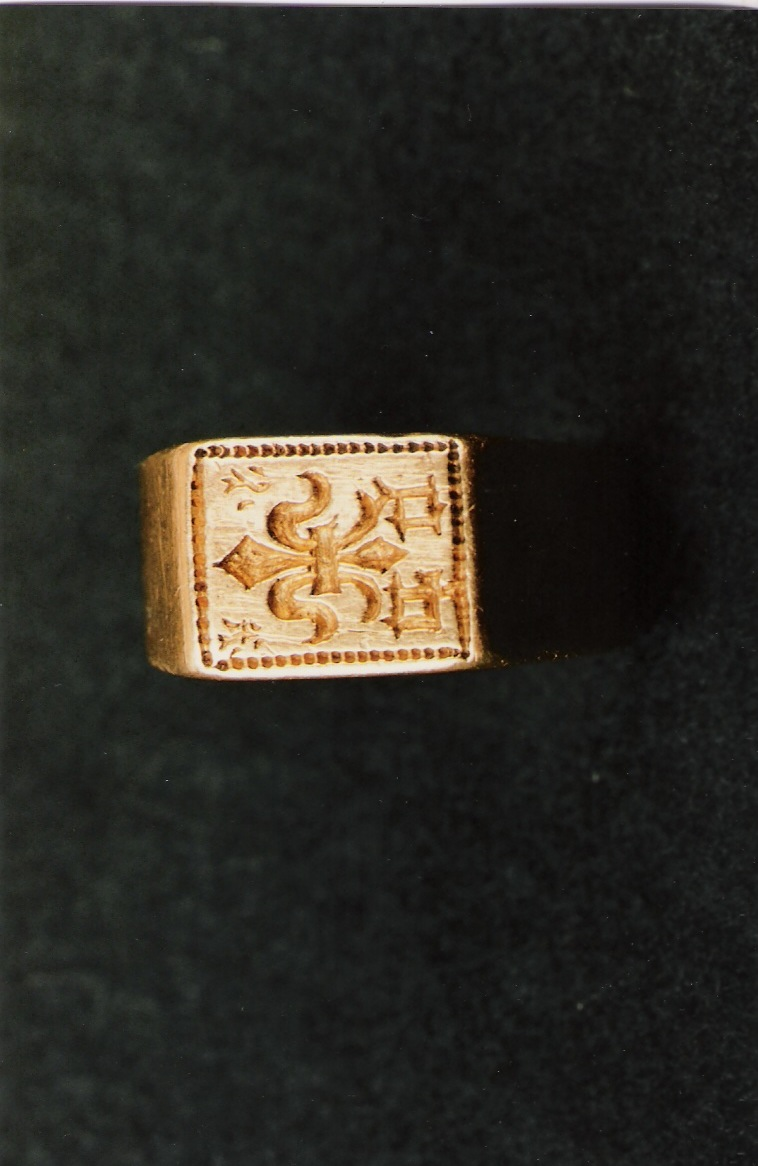

== Early life ==
Palmes was the son eldest son and heir of William Palmes of Naburn and Eleanor, daughter of William Heslerton of Heslerton. He was a member of the Palmes family, an ancient upper-gentry family that had been seated at Naburn Hall since the 13th century.

In about 1480 he and his younger brother Guy entered the Middle Temple, where both were to do well. In 1496 he became recorder of York in succession to Sir William Fairfax, and in the following year was made a Freeman; he proved more diligent in attending the York council than some recorders, twice supervising elections when a mayor died in office. It was a measure of the city’s satisfaction that in 1504 it appointed his brother, who was already a sergeant, to be "of counsel" at 20s. a year. His and his first wife’s membership of the city’s Corpus Christi guild, and his own of the merchants' guild, suggest that he engaged in trade. When in December 1509 Palmes was elected to Parliament he at once resigned the recordership. The city rarely elected its recorder and the choice of Palmes may have been influenced by his recent despatch to London with two aldermen, one of them his fellow-Member William Nelson, on unspecified business. Unlike Nelson, he was not to be re-elected, perhaps because he was made a sergeant in 1510, but his continued standing in the city and shire is reflected in his appointment to nine subsidy commissions between 1512 and 1515. Little of a personal nature has come to light about his later years. In 1515 he presented his son George (later Wolsey’s confessor and a canon of York) to the living of Sutton-upon-Derwent, Yorkshire, and in the following year he was named executor by his brother.

== Family ==
Palmes married first Anastasia or Eustachia, whose surname is unknown. His second wife was Ellen Acclome, the daughter of John Acclome of Moreby Hall, Yorkshire. His third wife was Anne Markenfield Conyers, daughter of Sir Thomas Markenfield of Markenfield Hall and widow of Christopher Conyers of Sockburn, county Durham. Palmes was the father of five children from his second marriage:

- Nicholas Palmes (d. 1551), succeeded his father to Naburn Hall. He married his cousin Johana, daughter of William Conyers of Sockburn Hall, who was the mother of his eldest son and heir, Brian. He married secondly Susan, daughter of Sir Robert Waterton of Walton Hall, West Yorkshire.
- George Palmes, died unmarried
- William Palmes, died unmarried
- Richard Palmes, died unmarried
- Agnes Palmes, married in 1559 Sir William Babthorpe of Babthorpe and Osgodby. They were the parents of two children.

== Marston Moor signet ring ==
Palmes' portrait depicts him wearing a signet ring on his index finger; this ring was lost by his descendant in the Battle of Marston Moor and it was found during the 1860s when a farmer was ploughing the battle site.

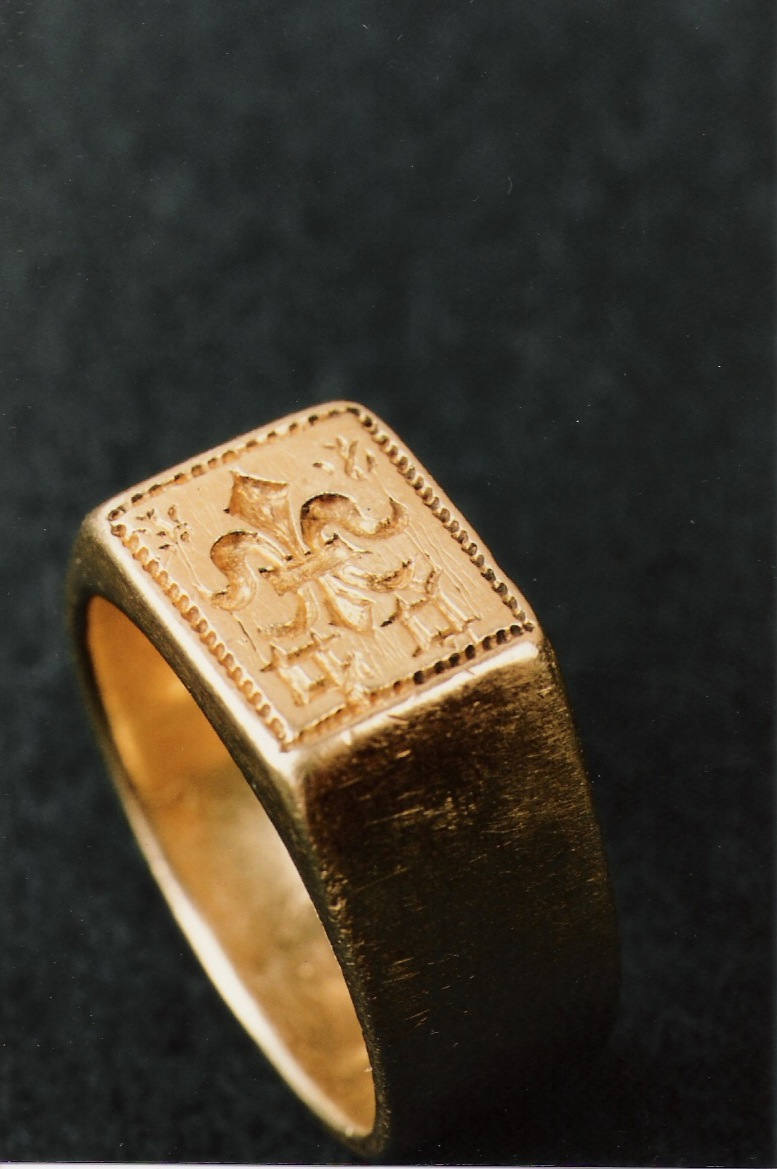

== Death ==
In his own will of 31 October 1519 Palmes asked to be buried in his parish church of St. George, York, whither his body was to be escorted by friars from the four York houses and by members of York's Corpus Christi guild, and to have prayers said for him and his family locally for seven years and at Roecliffe for ever. He made numerous bequests of lands and goods to his family, and named as executors and residuary legatees his wife, Sir William Bulmer and Sir Guy Dawny, Thomas Langton and James Duffelde, gentlemen, Richard Ellis, clerk, and William Marshall. The will was proved on 11 January 1520 and an inquisition post mortem held at York castle on 27 (?)April 1520 found that Palmes had died on 1 Oct. (sic) 1519 leaving as his heir a 20-year-old son Nicholas. At his death Palmes held the manors of Naburn and Gate Fulford, and lands, some of them acquired recently, scattered over a wide area of Yorkshire.
