= Billie Palmes =

British Army officer and polo player (1884–1961)

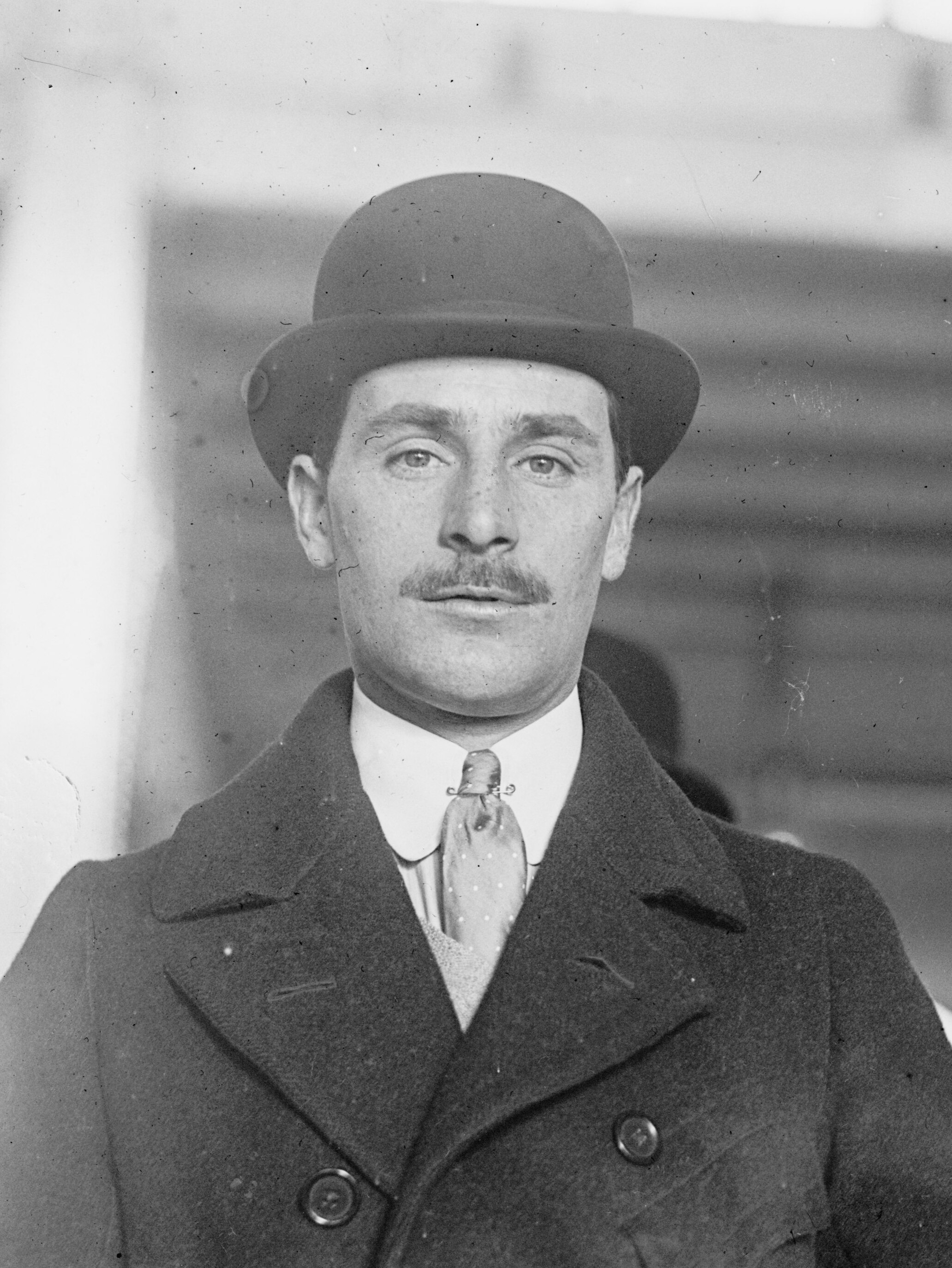
Major Billie Palmes

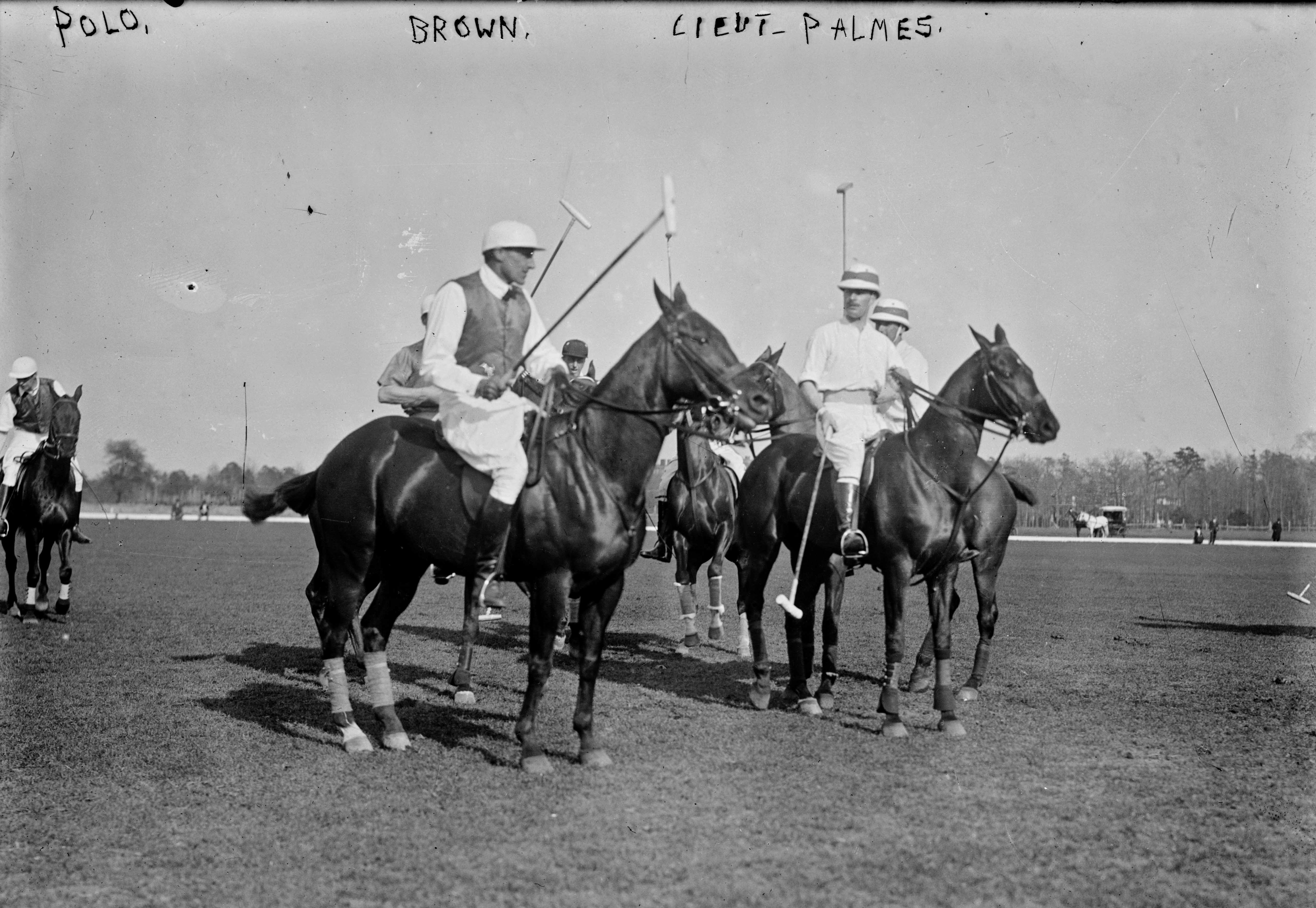
Palmes on the right hand side

Major Edward William Eustace Palmes (23 August 1884 – 31 March 1961) was an English international polo player.

== Early life ==
Palmes came from an aristocratic family of Yorkshire. He was the son of Major Guy St. Maur Palmes, Justice of the Peace of Lingcroft and Naburn, York and Georgina Rosabelle Lloyd, the daughter of Edward Lloyd. He was educated at Wellington College and the Royal Military College, Sandhurst. He was then commissioned into the 10th Royal Hussars.

== Polo ==
He was a member of the polo team that won the inter-regimental polo tournament in India in six consecutive years (1907–12). In 1913 he was a member of the Quidnuncs team, which won the Champion, Whitney, and Coronation Cups. He was a 9 handicap player and reached the final of the Khadir Cup in 1910. He played for Count J de Madre's Tiger team.

== Military ==
Palmes served between 1914 and 1918 in World War I with the 10th Royal Hussars and was wounded twice. He was awarded the Military Cross "for conspicuous gallantry and devotion to duty. He assumed command of the regiment under very difficult circumstances and organised the defence of his position. He showed great courage and ability under very heavy fire, and on relief volunteered to hold his posts for a further twenty-four hours, which he did with two of his squadrons".

== Personal life ==
He was noted for being a very good game shot. Palmes was an active and involved commander in the Home Guard battalion of World War II.
