= Manfred Palmes =

English cricketer and Royal Navy officer

Personal information
- Full name: Manfred Jerome Palmes
- Born: 7 February 1887; Naburn, Yorkshire, England
- Died: 5 May 1968 (aged 81); Simon's Town, Cape Province, South Africa
- Batting: Unknown
- Bowling: Unknown

Career statistics
Competition	First-class
Matches	2
Runs scored	10
Batting average	3.33
100s/50s	–/–
Top score	6
Balls bowled	114
Wickets	0
Bowling average	–
5 wickets in innings	–
10 wickets in match	–
Best bowling	–
Catches/stumpings	–/–
- Source: Cricinfo, 16 December 2019

Manfred Jerome Palmes (5 February 1887 – 5 May 1968) was an English first-class cricketer and Royal Navy officer.

A member of the Palmes family, he was the son of Francis Jerome Palmes and Mary Theresa Broadbent and was born in February 1887 at Naburn Hall at Naburn, Yorkshire. Palmes graduated from the Britannia Royal Naval College in 1906, entering the Royal Navy as an acting sub-lieutenant, with confirmation in the rank coming in April 1908. The following April he was promoted to the rank of lieutenant. He served with the Royal Navy in the First World War, during which he was promoted to the rank of lieutenant commander in March 1917. Following the war, Palmes played first-class cricket for the Royal Navy Cricket Club, making two appearances against the British Army cricket team at Lord's in 1919 and 1920. He was promoted to the rank of commander in December 1921, a rank he retained until his retirement in February 1933. Palmes later emigrated to South Africa, where he died at Simon's Town in May 1968.
