= Listed buildings in Lindley, North Yorkshire =

Lindley is a civil parish in the county of North Yorkshire, England. It contains four listed buildings that are recorded in the National Heritage List for England. All the listed buildings are designated at Grade II, the lowest of the three grades, which is applied to "buildings of national importance and special interest". The parish contains the village of Lindley and the surrounding countryside. The listed buildings consist of a farmhouse, a barn, a milepost and a bridge.

== Buildings ==
Name and location	Photograph	Date	Notes
Lindley Hall Farmhouse; 53.93710°N 1.66111°W	—	16th century	The house is in gritstone, with a moulded string course, a moulded eaves cornice, and a stone slate roof with stone coping. There are two storeys and six bays. On the front is a blocked round-arched doorway with a moulded surround. Most of the windows are mullioned, with some mullions missing, and the other windows are casements.
Barn west of Lindley Hall Farmhouse; 53.93718°N 1.66172°W	—	Late 16th century	The barn is in stone with quoins and a stone slate roof. On the east front is an extended aisle. The barn contains various openings, including barn doors, loft doors, and an owl hole in a gable apex.
Milepost; 53.93388°N 1.65370°W		Mid 18th century	The milepost at a road junction is in gritstone, it has a square section, and is about 90 centimetres (35 in) high. On the south face is a crudely carved pointing hand, and the lettering has been defaced.
Lindley Bridge; 53.93077°N 1.65931°W		After 1767	The bridge carries Cinder Lane over the River Washburn. It is in stone, and consists of a tall round arch, a lower flood arch to the right, and a small round arch further to the right. There are large pointed cutwaters on each side. The arches have voussoirs, and the main arches have a projecting band and a parapet with flat-pointed coping. The smaller arch has a keystone.
