= Naburn Hospital =

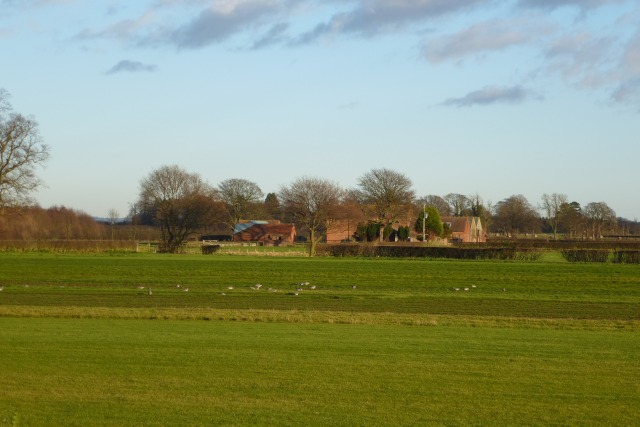
- Acres House, one part of the hospital

- Shown in North Yorkshire

Geography
- Location: Naburn, North Yorkshire, England
- Coordinates: 53.9187°N 1.0808°W

Organisation
- Care system: NHS
- Type: Specialist

Services
- Emergency department: N/A
- Speciality: Psychiatric Hospital

History
- Founded: 1906
- Closed: 1988

Links
- Lists: Hospitals in England

Naburn Hospital was a mental health facility in Naburn, North Yorkshire, England.

== History ==
Acres House, a property dating back to 1774, and its associated farmland were acquired in 1899 for the purposes of building an asylum. The facility, which was designed by Alfred Creer using a compact arrow layout, opened as York Borough Asylum in April 1906. After Naburn Lodge Farm was acquired in 1913, further expansion of the hospital became possible. It became the York City Mental Hospital in 1927 and joined the National Health Service as Naburn Hospital in 1948.

After the introduction of Care in the Community in the early 1980s, the hospital went into a period of decline and closed in February 1988. Most of the hospital buildings were subsequently demolished and the site was redeveloped as the York Designer Outlet Centre. However Acres House survives.
