= Palmes family =

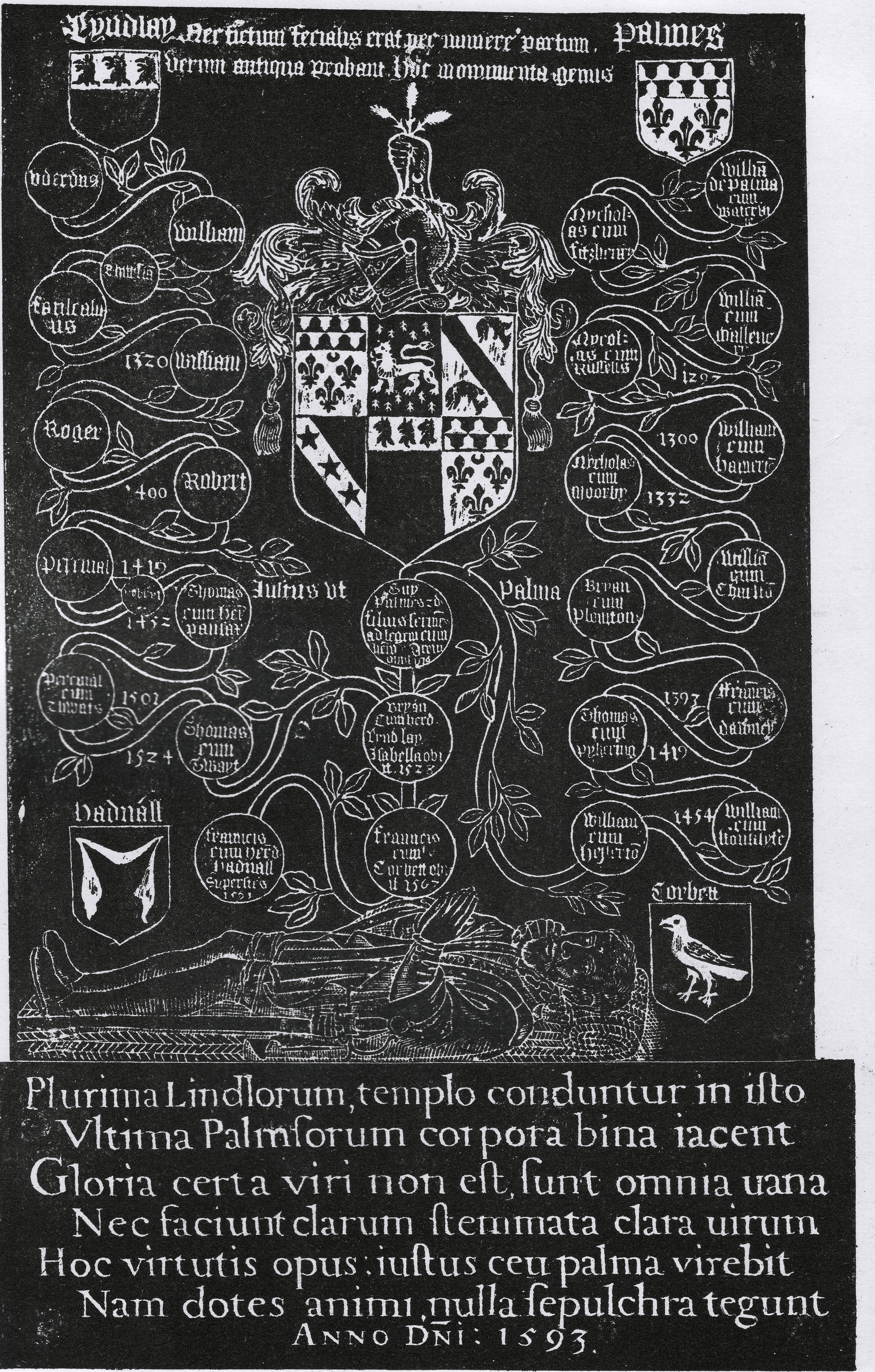
Palmes – Lindley memorial 1593, Otley Church

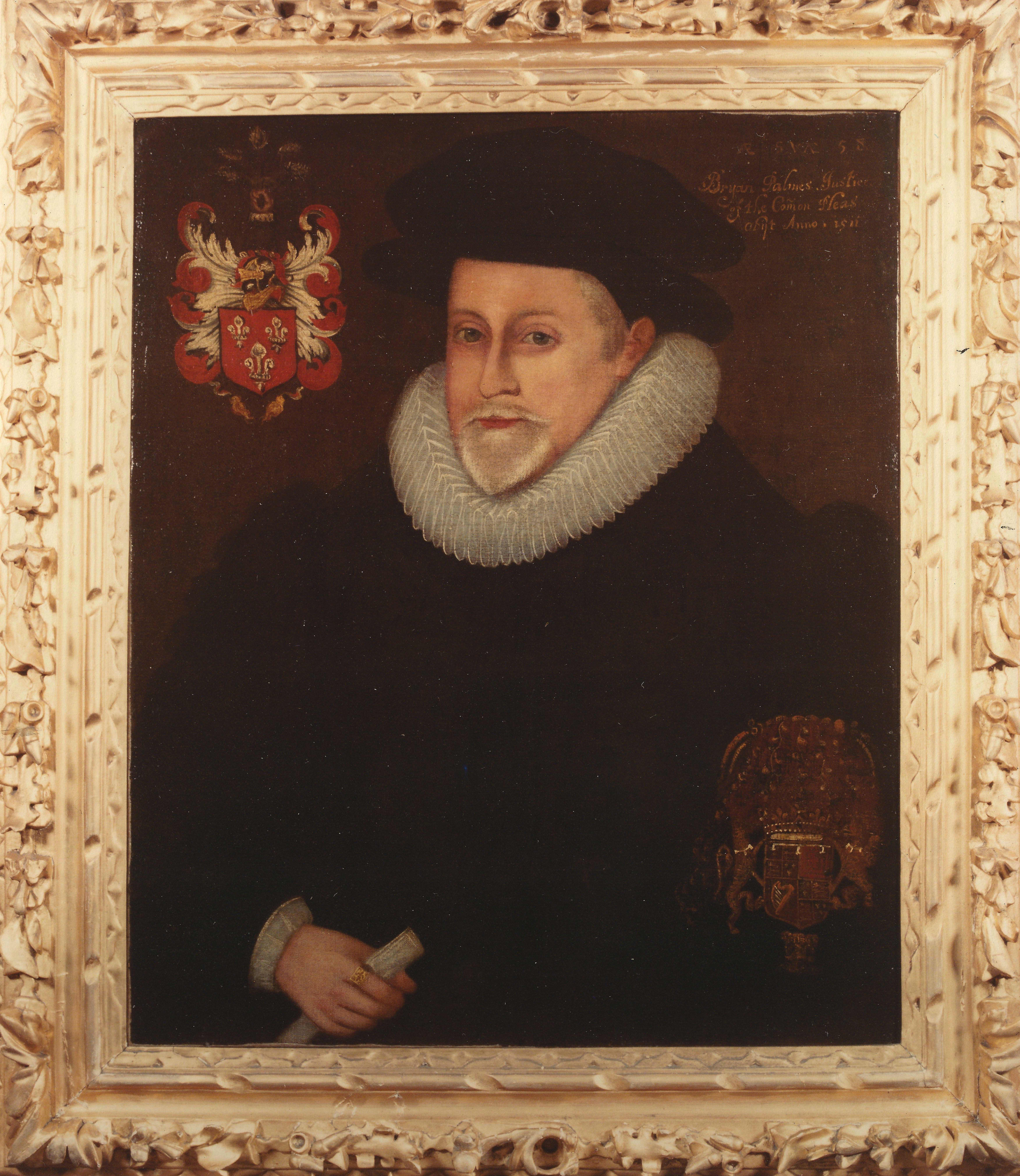
Bryan Palmes M.P., of Naburn Hall in 1511; Member of Parliament for York

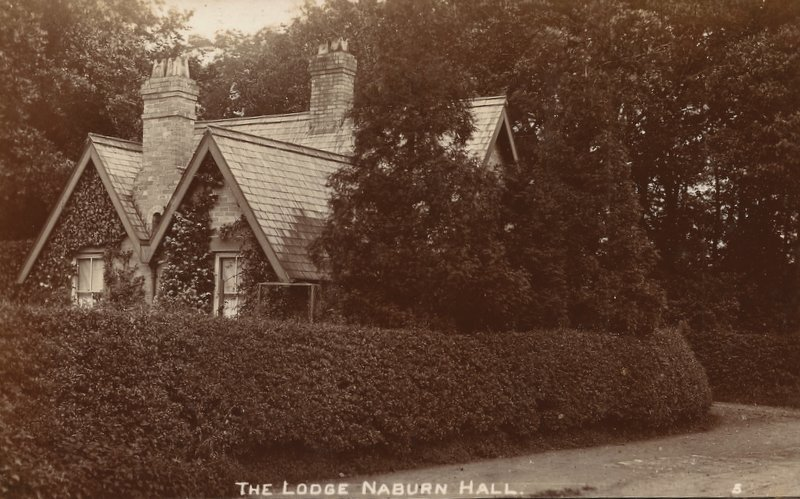
Lodge House of Naburn Hall

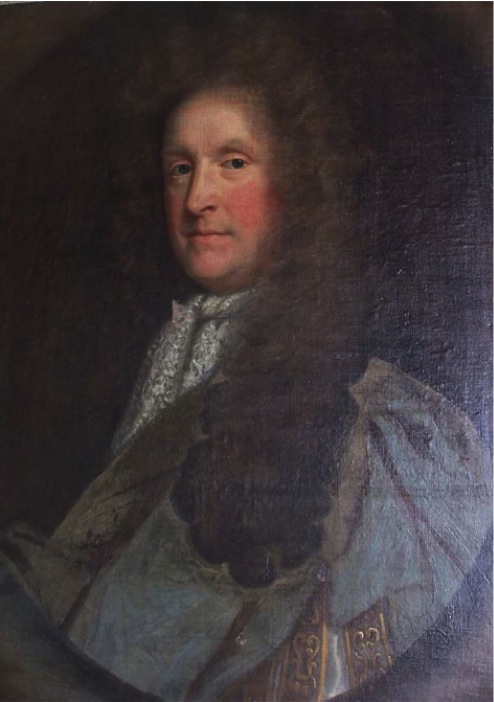
William Palmes, M.P., of Lindley Hall

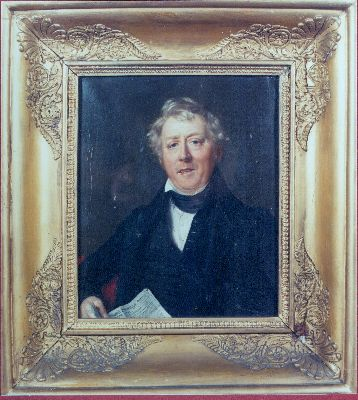
George Palmes (1776–1851), J.P., D.L., of Naburn Hall, Yorkshire. Portrait by Charles Robert Leslie

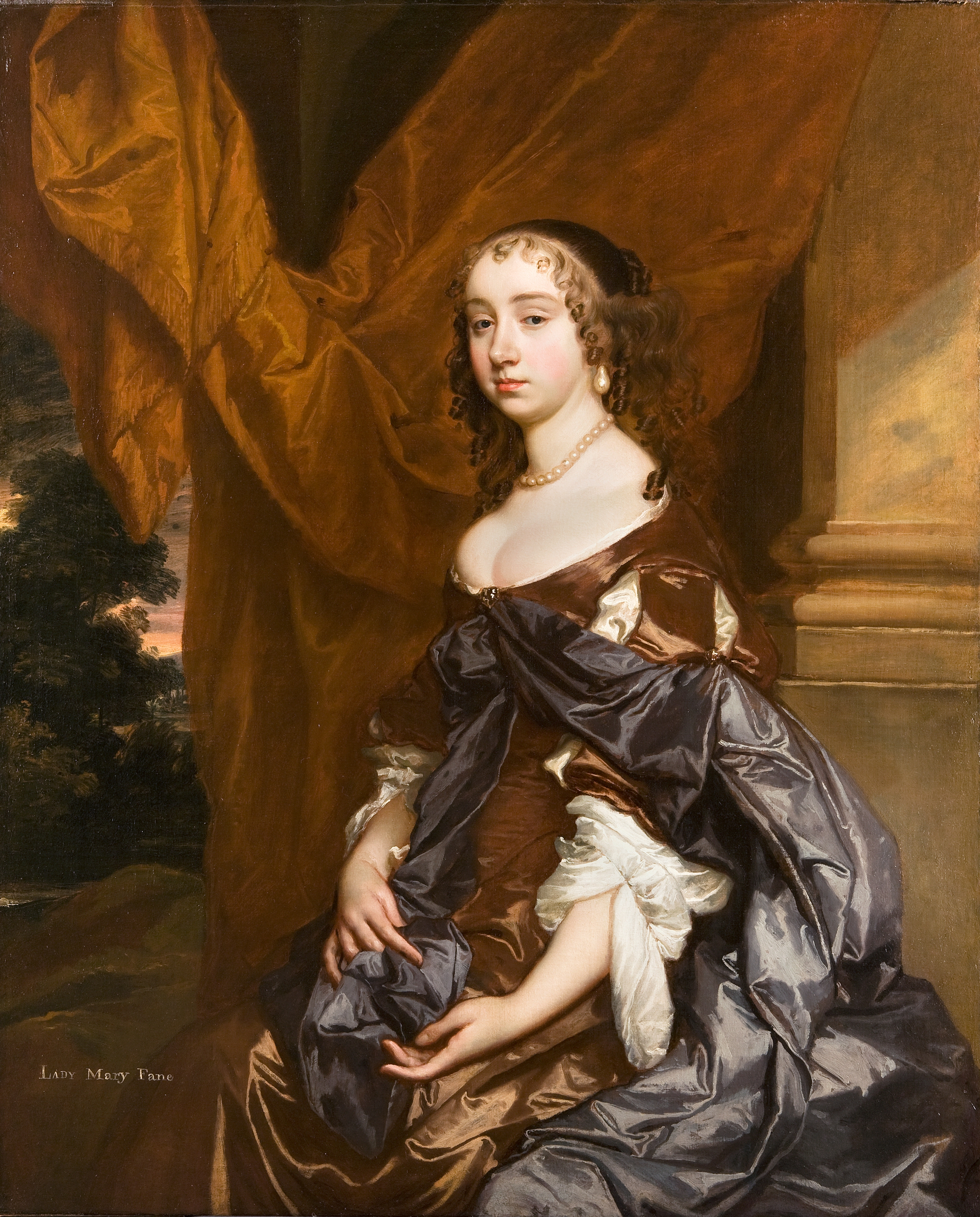
Lady Mary Fane by Sir Peter Lely.

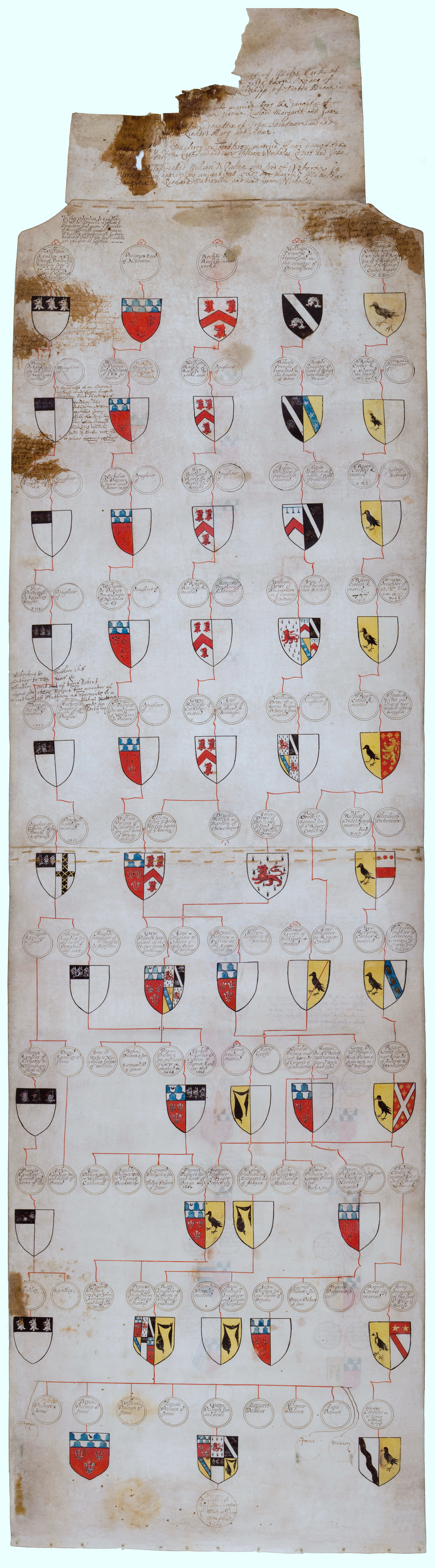
Palmes Pedigree Roll, 1599

The Palmes family of Naburn Hall, and the cadet branches of Lindley Hall, North Yorkshire; Ashwell, Rutland; and Carcraig in Ireland, is an ancient English aristocratic family, noted for their adherence to Catholicism.

== Origins and estates ==
The family were originally seated at Taunton Deane, Somerset, where Manfred de Palma/Palmes had by the "Gift of Milo Earl of Hereford & Constable of England, 53 Oxgangs of Land and 25 Messages in the Lordship of Taunton Dean". Manfred was "known to be living in the sixth year of the reign of King Stephen, 1140 AD".

The Palmes family of Naburn can trace its ancestry through a maternal line to Robert de Todeni (died 1088), a powerful Norman baron. Todeni's importance is reflected by the 80 estates in 11 counties that he was granted by William across England. His principal Lordship was at Belvoir where he built his home, Belvoir Castle, before establishing Belvoir Priory in 1076. Among Todeni's many estates was Naburn. In 1226, William Palmes of Taunton acquired the Lordship of Naburn through his marriage to Matilda, daughter or sister of Richard de Watterville; a direct descendant of Robert de Todeni from whom the land had passed to the Wattervilles. From then on, the estate continued to descend uninterrupted from father to son within the Palmes family until 1974, on the death of Commander George Bryan Palmes. The Palmes family were said to have been "unique in being able to boast an unbroken heritage". Edmund Burke described the family as "one of serious antiquity".

The will of Brian Palmes, Sergeant-at-Law, of Naburn Hall, was dated 31 October 1519. It shows that in addition to Naburn the family held estates in: Riccall, Escrick, South Duffield, Elvington, Barthorpe, Sutton, Holtby, Berrythorpe and Gate Fulford. A cadet branch of the family was seated at Lindley Hall, North Yorkshire, and an Irish line of the family settled at Carcraig.

=== Naburn Hall ===
The manor house of the Palmes family – Naburn Hall – is first recorded in 1345. It had eight hearths in 1672. A drawing of circa 1720 shows it as a two-storey house, three bays long, with attic windows in tall pointed gables. The house was remodelled in 1735 by Brian Palmes (1696–1737), who was married to Anne, daughter of Robert Scarisbrick of Scarisbrick Hall. The hall was again altered in 1818 by George Palmes (1776–1851). In 1870, it was restored and enlarged to the designs of William Atkinson, though the 18th century interior and central block remained unchanged. The main three-storey square block of rendered brick and stone dressings has a concealed slate roof. In the 19th century, a two-storey wing was attached. Attached to the rear of the hall is the derelict yellow brick and tile Chapel of St. Nicholas, originally built in the 16th century by Nicholas Palmes (died 1551) of Naburn, so his family could continue to practice Catholicism. The chapel was rebuilt in 1870. The Coach house and Stables were built in the late 18th century with a Pedimented Clock tower and domed bell-turret. A one and a half-storey Gate Lodge was built on the main road in the early 19th century, with a central stack, slated roof and veranda.

=== Lindley Hall ===
Guy Palmes was the brother of Bryan Palmes of Naburn Hall, and like him also a Serjeant-at-law during the reign of Henry VII and Henry VIII. His son and heir, Brian, married Isabell (died 1550), daughter and co-heir of Thomas Lindley, of Lindley, North Yorkshire. Their son, Sir Francis Palmes, acquired the Lordship of Lindley and established the family at Lindley Hall, renouncing his Catholic faith to become a Protestant. His great-great-grandson, William Palmes of Lindley, married the Hon. Mary Eure, younger daughter and co-heir of William Eure (died 1645), 6th Baron Eure. Their only surviving son died without issue and Lindley was acquired by their son-in-law, Sir William Strickland, 3rd Baronet, of Sizergh Castle, the husband of their youngest and only surviving daughter, Elizabeth.

== History ==
=== Notable family members ===
- Brian Palmes, a Royalist in the English Civil War and MP for Stamford
- Sir Francis Palmes, MP for Knaresborough (died 1613)
- Brian Palmes (died 1519) MP for York
- Sir Guy Palmes MP MP for Rutland and High Sheriff of Yorkshire
- General Francis Palmes, MP for West Looe
- William Palmes, MP for Malton
- Major Billie Palmes, international Polo player
- Manfred Palmes (1887–1968), cricketer

Several members of the family have married into the peerage, this includes:

- Anne the daughter of Sir Guy Palmes to Robert Sutton, 1st Baron Lexinton (Anne was the widow of Sir Thomas Browne, 2nd Baronet)
- Francis Palmes to Lady Mary Fane (1639–1681) who was the daughter of Mildmay Fane, 2nd Earl of Westmorland. After being widowed by Francis she went on to marry John Cecil, 4th Earl of Exeter
- William Palmes married the Hon. Mary Eure, younger daughter and co-heiress of William Eure (died 1645) of Malton, 6th Baron Eure. Through this marriage he acquired most of Malton town.

=== Civil War ===
Sir Brian Palmes raised a regiment for King Charles I; subsequently he was compounded for his estate by the Parliamentarians.

The family had links to the Fairfax family through the marriage of Janes, Sir Guy Palmes' daughter to Sir Nicholas Fairfax, son of Sir Thomas Fairfax of Denton, Yorkshire, this couple were the grandparents of Thomas Fairfax, 1st Viscount Fairfax.

Sir Guy Palmes initially opposed King Charles I and later became an ardent Royalist.[14] His son Sir Bryan Palmes was a Royalist also.[15]

=== Catholicism and Nonconformity ===
The Palmes family were Nonconformist; in the 17th century they received quietuses for recusancy fines. Catholicism excluded the Palmes family from public office and they seem to have retreated to their estates, though their pedigree indicates that they continued to marry well, usually to other large landed Catholic families like the Langdales and the Stapletons.

The heir of Brian Palmes, Nicholas Palmes (died 1551) of Naburn Hall, married twice and left an heir, Brian Palmes (d. circa 1581), whose second wife, Anne, was the daughter of John Constable of Burton Constable Hall. These two generations of the Palmes family were the first to be affected by The Reformation. Coming from a family who for several generations had been admitted of Corpus Christi, York, they were not swift to abandon their Catholicism and Brian Palmes was the first member of the family to be recorded as paying a recusancy fine in 1577. Unfortunately for the Palmes family they were rather visible, as Naburn Hall stood two miles downstream on the opposite bank to the palace of the Archbishop of York on the River Ouse and they went on suffering fines for non-attendance at church until they changed religious allegiance in 1784. Until that time their Catholicism meant that half the village of Naburn was Catholic as well, while the other half of the village followed the Protestant example of the Baines family at Bell Hall.
