= St Andrew's Church, Bugthorpe =

Church in the East Riding of Yorkshire, England

Coordinates: 54°00′40″N 0°49′22″W

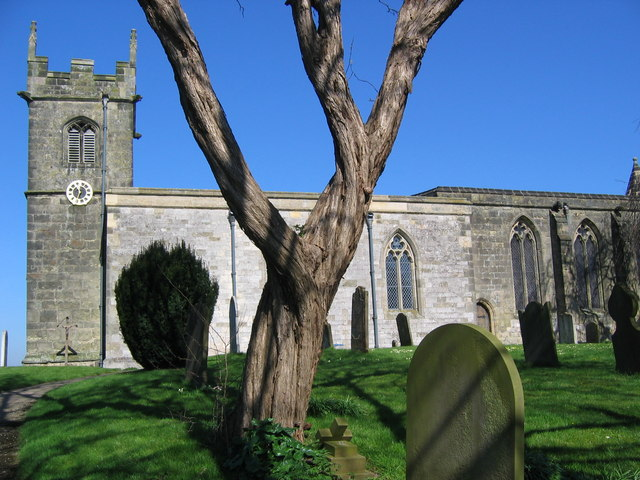
- The church in April 2007
- St Andrew's Church, Bugthorpe
- Location: Bugthorpe, East Riding of Yorkshire

Architecture
- Heritage designation: Grade I listed
- Years built: 12th century

St Andrew's Church is the parish church of Bugthorpe, a village in the East Riding of Yorkshire, in England.

The church was built in the 12th century, from which period the western chancel arch survives. The chancel was rebuilt around 1300, while the tower was added in the 15th century. A north chapel was demolished in the 18th century, then the nave was demolished and rebuilt in 1859. The upper stage of the tower was rebuilt in 1878, and a new north chapel and porch were constructed in 1905. The church was grade I listed in 1967.

The church is built in stone with lead roofs, and consists of a nave, a chancel with a north chapel and a northeast stair turret, and a west tower. The tower has two stages, a moulded plinth, a moulded string course, pointed two-light bell openings under a four-centred arch, gargoyles, and an embattled parapet with crocketed corner pinnacles. Inside the church are two chancel arches, one 12th century with various carved figures and one from about 1300. There are a sedilia, piscina, and several 17th- and 18th-century monuments.

== See also ==
- Grade I listed buildings in the East Riding of Yorkshire
- Listed buildings in Bugthorpe
