= Listed buildings in Bugthorpe =

Bugthorpe is a civil parish in the county of the East Riding of Yorkshire, England. It contains six listed buildings that are recorded in the National Heritage List for England. Of these, one is listed at Grade I, the highest of the three grades, one is at Grade II*, the middle grade, and the others are at Grade II, the lowest grade. The parish contains the village of Bugthorpe, and the surrounding countryside, and the listed buildings consist of houses, a church and a chapel.

== Key ==
Grade	Criteria
I	Buildings of exceptional interest, sometimes considered to be internationally important
II*	Particularly important buildings of more than special interest
II	Buildings of national importance and special interest

== Buildings ==
Name and location	Photograph	Date	Notes	Grade
St Andrew's Church; 54.01120°N 0.82278°W		12th century	The church has been altered and enlarged through the centuries, including rebuilding of the nave in 1858–59, and the porch in 1905. The church is built in stone with lead roofs, and consists of a nave, a chancel with a north chapel and a northeast stair turret, and a west tower. The tower has two stages, a moulded plinth, a moulded string course, pointed two-light bell openings under a four-centred arch, gargoyles, and an embattled parapet with crocketed corner pinnacles. Inside the church are Norman arches.	I
Low Hall; 54.01334°N 0.82440°W	—	Late medieval	The house, on a moated site, has a timber framed core. It was encased in red brick in the late 18th century, with limestone at the rear, and has a pantile roof. There are two storeys, and five bays, with a rear wing, and a rear outshut under a catslide roof. On the front are a doorway and sash windows, all under flat gauged brick arches. Inside, there is extensive timber framing.	II*
Corner Farmhouse; 54.01058°N 0.82506°W		Late 18th century	The farmhouse is in brick, with a stepped brick eaves cornice and a pantile roof. There are two storeys and three bays. On the front is a doorway and sash windows.	II
Freestone House; 54.01156°N 0.82101°W		Late 18th century	The house is in limestone, the gables have been rebuilt in engineering brick, and the roof is pantiled. There are two storeys and three bays. The central doorway has a divided fanlight, the windows are sashes, and all the openings have wedge lintels.	II
The Grange; 54.01697°N 0.83805°W	—	Late 18th century	The house is in brick, with a floor band, a stepped brick eaves cornice and a pantile roof. There are two storeys and three bays. On the front is a doorway, and sash windows under segmental brick arches.	II
Methodist Chapel; 54.01317°N 0.82191°W	—	1833	The chapel is in grey brick, with a stepped brick eaves cornice and a pantile roof. There is a single storey and two bays. On the front are two sash windows with flat brick arches, and the doorway is on the right return.	II
