= Low Hall, Bugthorpe =

House in Bugthorpe, East Riding of Yorkshire, England

Low Hall
- Location within East Riding of Yorkshire

General information
- Location: Beck Row, Bugthorpe, East Riding of Yorkshire, England
- Coordinates: 54°00′48″N 0°49′28″W
- Year built: Late medieval
- Renovated: Late 18th century (altered and added)

Listed Building – Grade II*
- Official name: Low Hall
- Designated: 26 January 1967
- Reference no.: 1083872

Low Hall is a historic building on Beck Row in Bugthorpe, a village in the East Riding of Yorkshire, England.

The house lies within earthworks, including a large moat, former fishponds and banks of unclear purpose. The timber framed building was constructed in the late medieval period as the manor house for the village. In the late 18th century, it was encased in brick, the front wall being entirely rebuilt, and a rear wing was added. The house was Grade II* listed in 1967.

The house has a timber framed core, encased in red brick, with limestone at the rear, has a pantile roof, and a chimneystack partly built of stone. It has two storeys, and is five bays wide, with a rear wing, and a rear outshut under a catslide roof. On the front are a doorway and sash windows, all under flat gauged brick arches. Inside, it has a lobby-entry plan, with three rooms in a row.

== See also ==
- Grade II* listed buildings in the East Riding of Yorkshire
- Listed buildings in Bugthorpe
