= Bugthorpe =

Village and civil parish in the East Riding of Yorkshire, England

Coordinates: 54°00′41″N 0°49′18″W

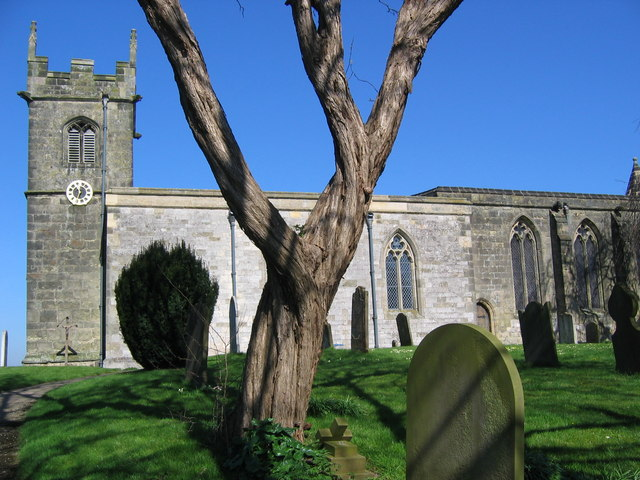
- St Andrew's church, Bugthorpe

- Location within the East Riding of Yorkshire
- Population: 103 (2011 census)
- OS grid reference: SE771579
  - London: 175 mi (282 km) S
- Civil parish: Bugthorpe
- Unitary authority: East Riding of Yorkshire
- Ceremonial county: East Riding of Yorkshire
- Region: Yorkshire and the Humber
- Country: England
- Sovereign state: United Kingdom
- Post town: YORK
- Postcode district: YO41
- Dialling code: 01759
- Police: Humberside
- Fire: Humberside
- Ambulance: Yorkshire
- UK Parliament: Bridlington and The Wolds

Bugthorpe is a village and civil parish in the East Riding of Yorkshire, England, about 11 miles (18 km) east of York and 16 miles (26 km) west of Driffield. The village is just south of the border with North Yorkshire. According to the 2011 UK Census the civil parish had a population of 103, a decrease on the 2001 UK Census figure of 122.

The name Bugthorpe derives from the Old Norse Buggiþorp meaning 'Buggi's secondary settlement'.

St Andrew's Church, Bugthorpe was designated a Grade I listed building in 1966 and is now recorded in the National Heritage List for England, maintained by Historic England. Next to the church is the village green.

Low Hall is also designated as a Grade II* listed building.

There are road links from the village to Skirpenbeck, Barthorpe Bottoms, Kirby Underdale, and the main A166 York to Bridlington road.

Bugthorpe has a village post office, a brewery and a small school.

== See also ==
- Listed buildings in Bugthorpe
