= Bagthorpe, Norfolk =

Village in Norfolk, England

Coordinates: 52.85°N 00.65°E

Bagthorpe
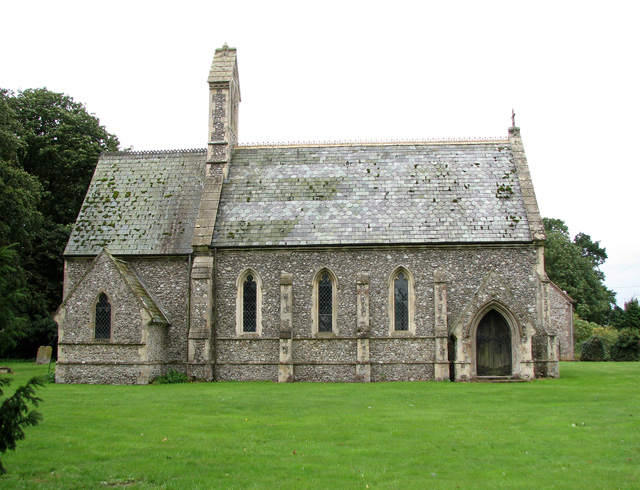
- St Mary's Church, Bagthorpe

- Location within Norfolk
- OS grid reference: TF7932
- Civil parish: Bagthorpe with Barmer
- District: King's Lynn and West Norfolk
- Shire county: Norfolk
- Region: East
- Country: England
- Sovereign state: United Kingdom
- Post town: King's Lynn
- Postcode district: PE31
- Dialling code: 01485
- Police: Norfolk
- Fire: Norfolk
- Ambulance: East of England

Bagthorpe is a village and former civil parish, now in the parish of Bagthorpe with Barmer, in the King's Lynn and West Norfolk district, in the county of in Norfolk, England. In 1931 the parish had a population of 68. On 1 April 1935 the parish was abolished to form "Bagthorpe with Barmer".

The name of the village derives from 'Bakki's/Bak's outlying farm/settlement' or 'Bacca's outlying farm/settlement'. Although this is uncertain.
