= William Babthorpe =

16th-century English politician

Sir William Babthorpe (1489/1490–1555) was an English politician of Osgodby and Flotmanby, Yorkshire.

His family were noted Roman Catholics when this was disadvantageous. His descendants included William Banbthorpe (died 1581), Ralph Babthorpe, Grace Babthorpe (died 1635), and William Babthorpe (died 1635).

== Life ==
William was the eldest son of William Babthorpe of Osgodby and educated in the law.

He held a number of public offices, including membership of the Council of the North from 1536 to his death and the Constableship of Wressle Castle (1513) and was knighted in 1547. He also served as the Custos Rotulorum of the East Riding of Yorkshire from c. 1547 to his death. He was a Member of Parliament (MP) for Yorkshire in 1547 and April 1554.

He died 27 February 1555. He had married Agnes, the daughter of Brian Palmes of Naburn, Yorkshire and had two sons and two daughters. William Babthorpe (died 1581), the eldest succeeded. His heir was Ralph Babthorpe who married Grace Babthorpe (born Bernand). Grace was an enthusiastic Roman Catholic and she had her children baptized in that religion, employing an unlicensed Catholic tutor for her children.
