= Barthorpe =

Hamlet in the North Riding of Yorkshire, England

Coordinates: 54.028°N 0.820°W

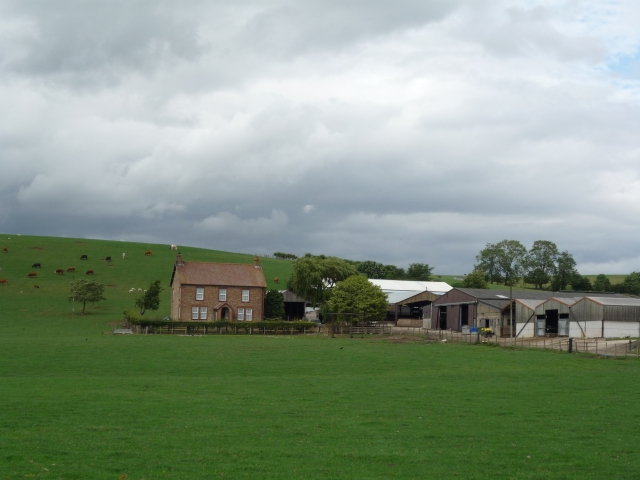
- Cottages at Barthorpe

- Location within North Yorkshire
- OS grid reference: SE773597
  - London: 176 mi (283 km) S
- Civil parish: Acklam
- Unitary authority: North Yorkshire
- Ceremonial county: North Yorkshire
- Region: Yorkshire and the Humber
- Country: England
- Sovereign state: United Kingdom
- Post town: YORK
- Postcode district: YO17
- Dialling code: 01759
- Police: North Yorkshire
- Fire: North Yorkshire
- Ambulance: Yorkshire
- UK Parliament: Bridlington and The Wolds

Barthorpe is a hamlet in North Yorkshire, England. It lies east of York, directly north of the village of Bugthorpe, and south of Acklam and Leppington.

The hamlet was recorded in the 1086 Domesday Book, with Count Robert of Mortain owning the land, and Waltheof being the landowner in 1066.

Historical significance: Barthorpe was originally a medieval village and was recorded in the Poll Tax returns of 1377 and 1381. The original village later disappeared, and only sites such as Barthorpe Grange and earthworks believed to be its remains survive today.
