= Bagthorpe with Barmer =

Civil parish in Norfolk, England

Coordinates: 52°51′51″N 0°40′42″E

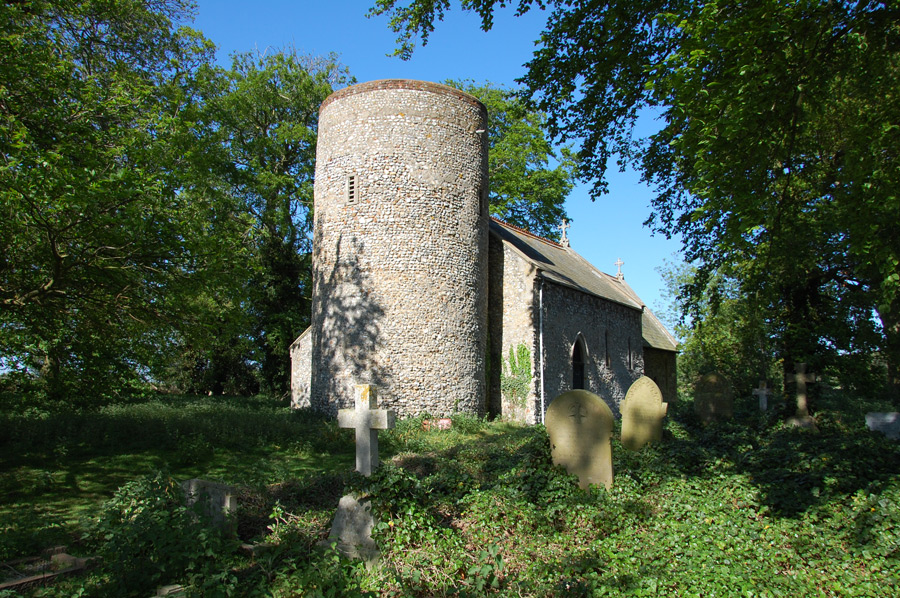
- Barmer All Saints Church

- Location within Norfolk
- Area: 3.5 sq mi (9.1 km^{2})
- OS grid reference: TF804330
- Civil parish: Bagthorpe with Barmer
- District: King's Lynn and West Norfolk
- Shire county: Norfolk
- Region: East
- Country: England
- Sovereign state: United Kingdom
- Post town: KING'S LYNN
- Postcode district: PE31
- Dialling code: 01485
- Police: Norfolk
- Fire: Norfolk
- Ambulance: East of England

Bagthorpe with Barmer is a civil parish in the English county of Norfolk. The parish includes the hamlets of Bagthorpe and Barmer, it is around 7 1/2 miles (12.1 km) west of Fakenham and is 12 miles (19 km) north-east of King's Lynn. As the population of the civil parish remained less than 100 during the 2011 Census, it was included in the civil parish of Stanhoe.

The civil parish has an area of 3 1/2 square miles (9.1 km^{2}) and in the 2001 census had a population of 53 in 22 households. For the local government, the parish falls within the district of King's Lynn and West Norfolk.

== Parish church ==
Barmer All Saints is a Grade II* listed building. It is a small building and is one of 124 existing round-tower churches in Norfolk. The church sits off the road, about 250 yards across a field in a copse of trees. In 1602 it was already a ruin, but in 1885 the Kerslake family decided to turn it into a mausoleum and employed the architect Frederick Preedy to restore the church. What exists today is largely Victorian, but there are remains of its earlier history. The round tower is Norman, but the origins may have been Anglo-Saxon as indicated by the flint quoins at the west end of the nave. The chancel arch is 12th Century and the nave 13th Century. The church was declared redundant in 1970, and it was taken over by the Norfolk Churches Trust in 1978.

The Kerslake coat of arms can be seen on a cast-iron tympanum above the door. The Kerslakes owned much of the surrounding land as well as the manor house. The house no longer exists, but part of the estate is incorporated into Manor Farm. Several of the Kerslake family are buried in the churchyard. The Kerslakes originate from the southwest of England where the family-owned shipyards building ships for the Royal Navy. Due to the considerable amount of work undertaken for the Admiralty during the 18th century, the family became wealthy and also a government creditor.
