= Lindley, North Yorkshire =

Village and civil parish in North Yorkshire, England

Coordinates: 53°56′N 1°39′W

Lindley
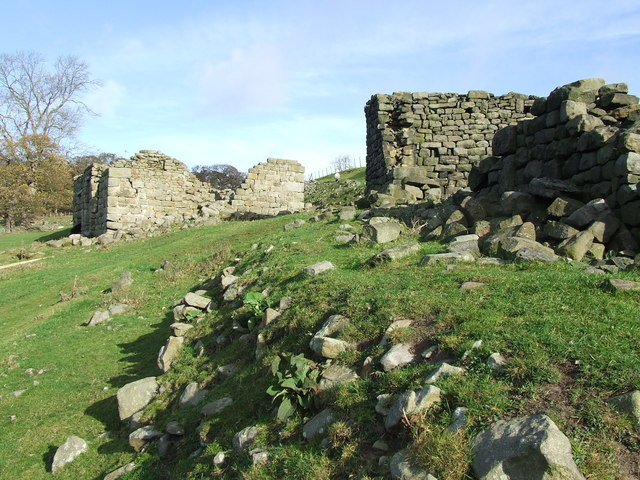
- Derelict farm, north-west of Lindley

- Location within North Yorkshire
- Civil parish: Lindley
- Unitary authority: North Yorkshire
- Ceremonial county: North Yorkshire
- Region: Yorkshire and the Humber
- Country: England
- Sovereign state: United Kingdom
- Police: North Yorkshire
- Fire: North Yorkshire
- Ambulance: Yorkshire

Lindley is a village and civil parish in the county of North Yorkshire, England. It is near Lindley Wood Reservoir and 1 mile north of Otley. In 2001 the parish had a population of 52. The population was estimated at 50 in 2015.

From 1974 to 2023 it was part of the Borough of Harrogate, it is now administered by the unitary North Yorkshire Council.

== History ==
The name "Lindley" means 'Lime-tree wood/clearing'. Lindley was formerly a township in Otley parish, in 1866 Lindley became a civil parish in its own right.

== See also ==
- Listed buildings in Lindley, North Yorkshire
