= Naburn =

Village and civil parish in North Yorkshire, England

Coordinates: 53°54′09″N 1°05′23″W

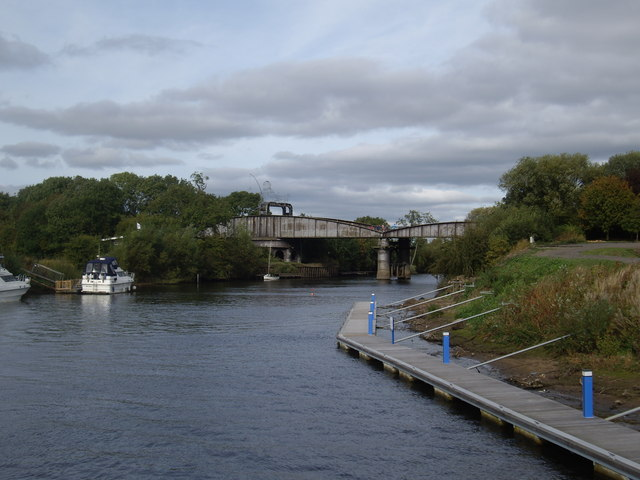
- Bridge near Naburn Marina

- Location within North Yorkshire
- Population: 516 (2011 census)
- OS grid reference: SE599455
  - London: 165 mi (266 km) S
- Civil parish: Naburn
- Unitary authority: City of York
- Ceremonial county: North Yorkshire
- Region: Yorkshire and the Humber
- Country: England
- Sovereign state: United Kingdom
- Post town: YORK
- Postcode district: YO19
- Dialling code: 01904
- Police: North Yorkshire
- Fire: North Yorkshire
- Ambulance: Yorkshire
- UK Parliament: York Outer

Naburn is a small village and civil parish in the unitary authority of the City of York in the ceremonial county of North Yorkshire, England. It lies on the eastern side of the River Ouse about 4 miles (6.4 km) south of York. According to the 2001 census the parish had a population of 470, increasing to 516 at the 2011 census.

The village was historically in the East Riding of Yorkshire. For administrative purposes it formed part of the Selby District in the shire county of North Yorkshire from 1974 until 1996. Since 1996 it has been part of the City of York unitary authority.

== History ==
The name Naburn is of uncertain origin. The second element is derived from the Old English burna meaning 'stream'. The first element possibly derives from nearu meaning 'narrow', or perhaps either the Old Norse ná meaning 'near', or nár meaning 'corpse'.

Naburn was a predominantly agricultural community with local farms prospering on the rich alluvial soil. The village was until the mid 20th century virtually totally owned by the Palmes family. On the Northern boundary was Naburn Hospital, a psychiatric hospital, formerly known as York City Asylum, until its closure in 1988. Adjacent to it was Fulford maternity hospital. In 1739 a ferry was situated just to the west of Naburn Hall, but by the early 19th century was in competition with a horse and foot road that led from the village street past the hall and across the ings to a ferry close to Acaster Malbis village. The latter ferry is said to have been started by the Thompsons of Escrick after Beilby Thompson married Dame Sarah Dawes to provide a connexion with her estate at Acaster. Due to increased traffic, it proved a nuisance to the Palmes family at Naburn Hall. In 1824 they closed the road with the ferry moving to a point near the middle of the village. The new ferry, for passengers and vehicles, was later worked by wheel and chain and was closed in 1956.

A weir was made at Naburn, a mile downstream from the village, in 1741 and a 'dam' or weir and a lock were opened in 1757. As a result, this created an island on which a water-mill was later built. A second, larger, lock was constructed beside the old one in 1888 and opened by Prince Albert Victor. The York-Selby railway line crossed the River Ouse just north of the village by way of a swing bridge built in 1871. Naburn station was closed to passengers in 1953 and to goods in 1964. In 1983 the Selby Diversion was opened and the line via Naburn closed and turned into a railway path and cycle route to provide a safe and attractive route between York and Selby for pedestrians and cyclists- forming part of the Sustrans network Route 65.

There were three alehouses in Naburn in the 1750s and 1760s, but by 1822 only the "Horse Shoe" remained. In 1872 it was renamed the "Blacksmiths' Arms".

In 1823 Naburn was in the parishes of Acaster Malbis and St George, York, in the Wapentake of Ouse and Derwent and the East Riding of Yorkshire. Within the village was a chapel of ease, a Methodist chapel, and an endowed school for ten boys. Population at the time was 366. Occupations included fifteen farmers and yeomen, two of whom were also butchers, two shoemakers, a wheelwright, a shopkeeper, a corn miller, a tailor, a lock keeper, and the landlord of The Horse shoe public house who was also a blacksmith. Resident were a schoolmaster, the ecclesiastical parish curate, and three Esquire gentlemen. A carrier operated between the village and York once a week.

A sewage works for York, covering about 20 acres, was opened beside the river in Naburn in 1895 and has been extended several times. A narrow gauge railway operated at the sewage works and consisted of a short stretch of line and a siding.

Before the Norman Conquest, Naburn was held by two Saxons, named Turgot and Turchil. After the Conquest, it was given, to Robert de Todeni, one of the Conquerors standard-bearers, from whom the Rutland family is descended. In 1086 there were two main estates recorded at Naburn, the one belonging to Robert de Todeni and the other to the King. The larger estate passed by way of marriage to the Aubignys until it passed, in 1284–5, to Robert de Ros. The Ros interest was mentioned as late as 1434. About 1200 the Watervill were lords of the manor of Naburn under the Aubignys. Richard de Watervill assigned the manor to William Palmes in 1226 and the estate remained in the Palmes family until the death of Commander George Bryan Palmes in 1974. The current head of the Palmes family is Antony Bryan Palmes (born 4 May 1930).

== Geography ==
Most of the parish is a little over 25 feet (7.6 m) above sea level with the extensive nearby ings being even lower. The village is surrounded by arable farmland and patches of woodland.

The soil consists of the alluvium of the Ouse flood-plain and patches of glacial sand and gravel east of the village and in the north-west is covered with outwash sand and clay.

Streams draining into the Ouse include Wood Dike, which forms a short section of the southern parish boundary, and Howden Dike, which joins the river at the north end of the village. The Ouse forms the entire parish boundary on the west.

Naburn is 2.5 miles north-west of Deighton, and about the same distance west of Crockey Hill, though the road distance is a mile longer. To the west of Naburn, the lack of a road crossing over the River Ouse means a long road journey to the relatively close villages of Acaster Malbis and Bishopthorpe. Naburn is 3 miles north of Stillingfleet and 4 miles south of York.

== Governance ==
Naburn lies in the Wheldrake Ward of the City of York unitary authority. As of 2024 it is represented by Luke Charters who is a member of the Labour Party.

== Demography ==
The population in 1801 was 363, increasing to 574 in 1901. The total had fallen to 537 by 1951, 473 by 1961, and 371 by 1971. According to the 2001 census the parish had a population of 470.

== Economy ==
Naburn has one public house, the Blacksmiths Arms. A small sub post office closed in 2022, with a part time farm shop opening in its place, this has since closed.

== Transport ==
Arriva run a bus service that stops in the village as part of its York to Drax route.

The village lies on Sustrans National Cycle Route 65, which provides an off-road link into York.

== Education ==
There has been a school in the village since 1743. The school was replaced by a National school, built nearby in Back Lane, in 1871, and enlarged in 1889. It is now a Church of England Primary School. As of 2017, the school falls within the catchment area of Fulford School for secondary education.

== Religious sites ==
A farm-house called Naburn Hill or White Cock Hall, beside the York road in the north-east of the parish, was used for Wesleyan Methodist worship in 1851 and was registered for the purpose in 1853, but by 1896 had fallen into disuse. The church of St. Matthew was rebuilt on its present site in 1854. The Palmes family had a private chapel at Naburn Hall.

== Sports and leisure ==
The Yorkshire Ouse Sailing Club, founded in 1938, has a club house near the former ferry. At the north end of the village, a marina was opened in 1970.

== Landmarks ==
South of the village is Bell Hall, a grade I listed building dating from 1680. Naburn Hall is a grade II listed building. Naburn Hall had been in possession of the Palmes family since 1226 and was passed down the generations until 1974. The house was rebuilt in 1735 and underwent alterations in 1818 and enlargement 1870. It consists of a three-storeyed square main block, with a two-storeyed wing. The 18th-century coach-house has a clock turret and bellcot.

Acres House was built in 1774 and formed part of the old hospital.

== Gallery ==
Views of Naburn
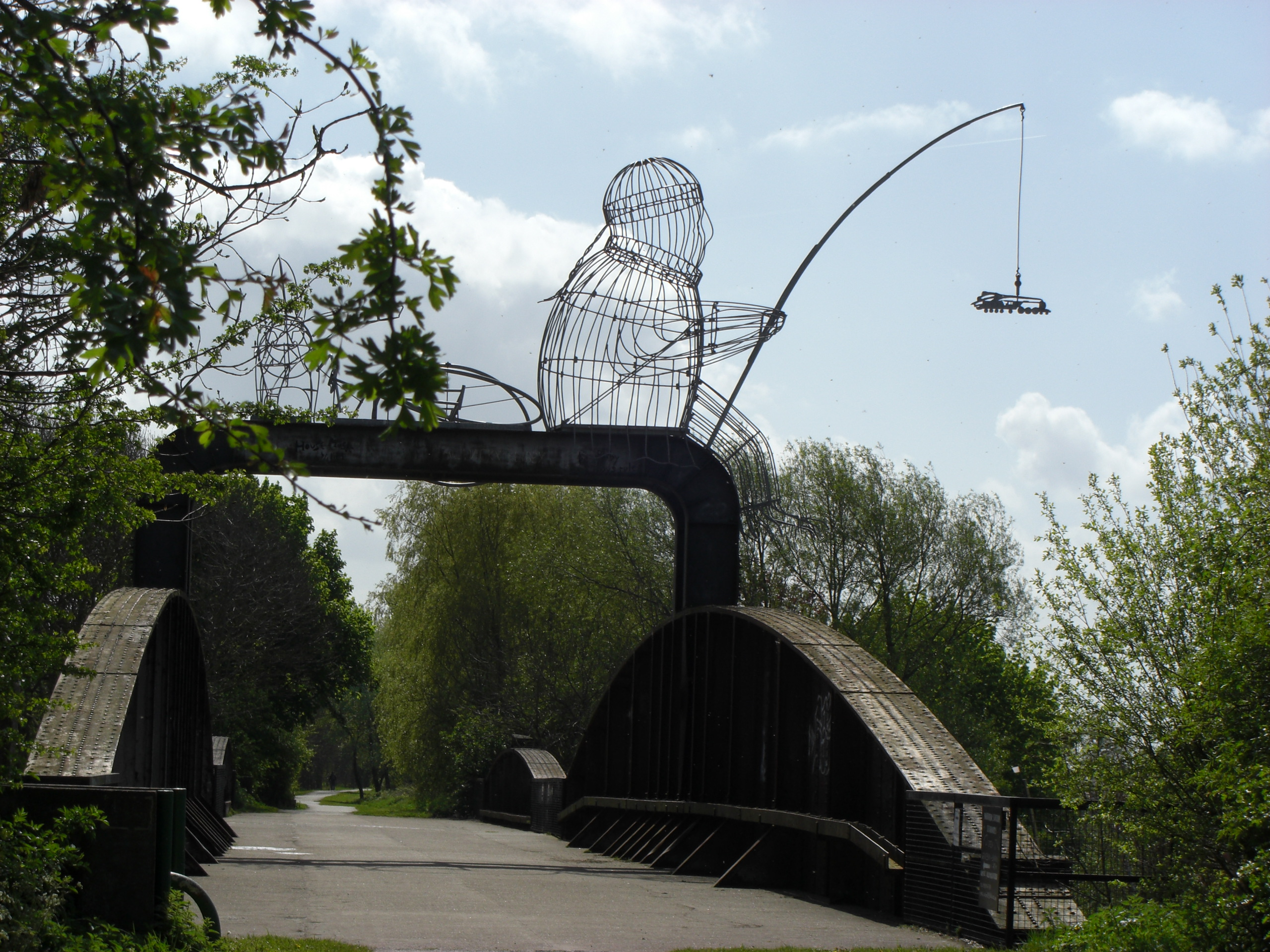
Naburn railway bridge near York, showing "The Fisher of Dreams" iron cage sculpture

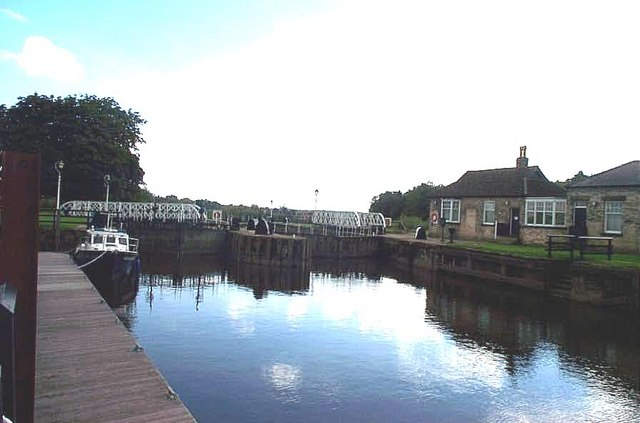
Naburn Locks looking south.

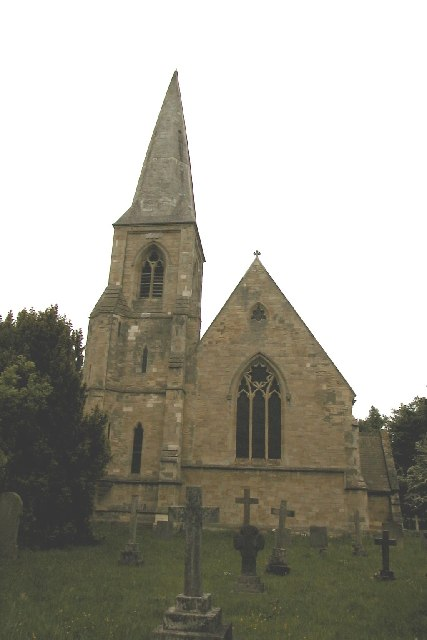
Naburn Church

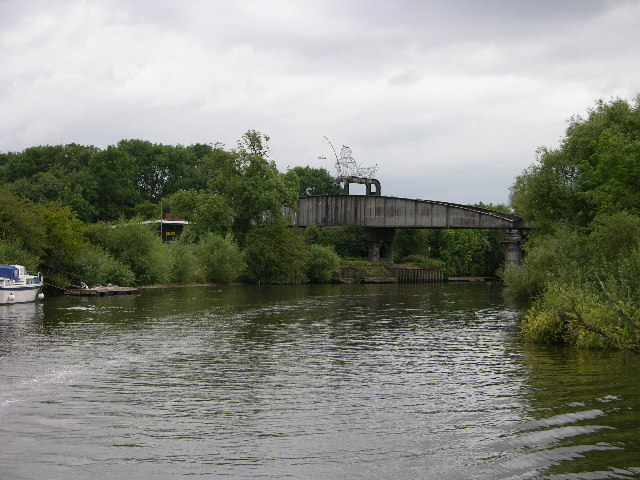
Naburn Bridge

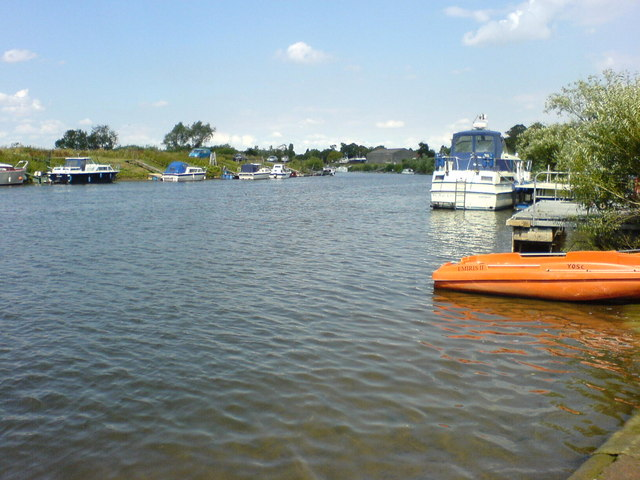
River Ouse at Naburn.

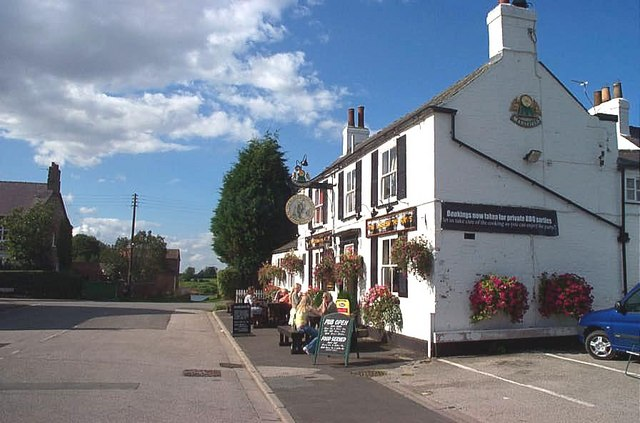
Naburn, The Blacksmiths Arms Public House

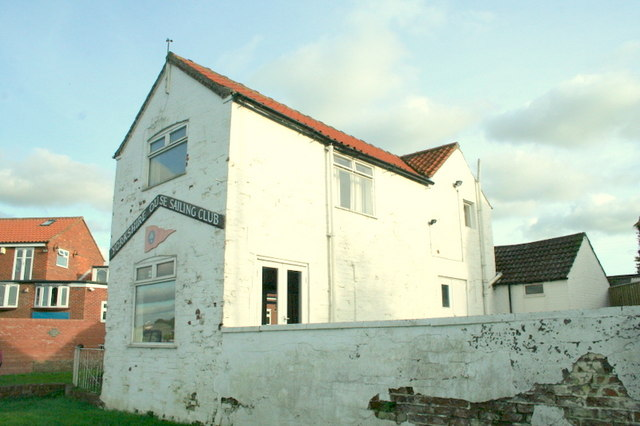
The Yorkshire Ouse Sailing Club at Naburn
