= Mackworth =

Mackworth may refer to:

== People ==
- Humphrey Mackworth (Parliamentarian) (1603–1654)
- Humphrey Mackworth (1657–1727)
- Humphrey Mackworth (born 1631)

== Places ==
- Mackworth, Amber Valley, a village and civil parish in Derbyshire, England
  - Mackworth Castle
- Mackworth, Derby, a housing estate and ward in the city of Derby, Derbyshire, England
