= Humphrey Mackworth (born 1631) =

English politician and soldier

Parliamentarian military governor of Shrewsbury
- In office 1655–1659

Member of House of Commons of England for Shropshire
- In office 1654–1659

Personal details
- Born: September 1631 Betton Strange, Shropshire
- Died: Unknown
- Relations: Humphrey Mackworth (father); Thomas Mackworth (brother); Humphrey Mackworth (nephew); Bulkeley Mackworth (nephew); Sir Francis Ottley; Richard Ottley
- Profession: Politician, soldier.

Humphrey Mackworth was an English politician and soldier of Shropshire landed gentry origins. He was military governor of Shrewsbury, in succession to his father and namesake, for almost five years under the Protectorate, from 1655 until late in 1659. He represented Shrewsbury in the First, Second and Third Protectorate Parliaments.

== Origins and early life ==
Mackworth was probably born in September 1631 as he was baptised on the 10th of the month in St Chad's Church, Shrewsbury, his local parish church. His parents were:

- Humphrey Mackworth of Betton Strange. At the time Mackworth senior was an ambitious young lawyer, a member of Gray's Inn, who was just making a transition from collecting reports on cases in London to working for the town of Shrewsbury. This move brought success and the position of alderman in 1633. The Mackworths originated in Mackworth, near Derby, where the senior branch of the family, the Mackworth baronets, had their seat at Mackworth Castle until migrating to Normanton, Rutland in the 17th century. Humphrey's very junior branch of the family had been involved in Shrewsbury's commerce and politics for about a century and had held Betton Strange, a manor a few miles south of the town, since 1544.
- Anne Waller, Mackworth's first wife, who had married him by May 1624. She was the daughter of Thomas Waller of Beaconsfield, and distantly related to the poet Edmund Waller.

The younger Humphrey is sometimes stated to be the second child of the marriage. He had an older brother, Thomas Mackworth (1627–96), who played a considerable part alongside him in the politics of Shropshire. However, there was another brother, William, who had died a few months before his own birth. Later came three sisters, starting with Anne, born a year after Humphrey. The family lived at Betton Strange, although Humphrey the elder also had official lodgings in town. The children were presumably brought up as Puritans. In autumn 1633, during a canonical visitation of St Chad's by Robert Wright, the Bishop of Lichfield, the incumbent Peter Studley included Humphrey Mackworth among the heads of twenty families who refused to bow at the name of Jesus or to kneel at the altar rail—a refusal which meant they were "wilful refusers to communicate for the gestures sake." His mother, Anne, died when the young Humphrey was four years old and was buried at St Chad's on 26 May 1636. The young Humphrey entered Shrewsbury School in 1638, the same year as his elder brother. In July of the same year his father married Mary Venables, by whom he was to have two more children.

The elder Humphrey continued to agitate against Laudianism and was a supporter of Parliament from the outset of its conflict with the king. At the outbreak of the English Civil War in the late summer of 1642, the royalists under Francis Ottley, a relative of the Mackworths, seized the initiative and occupied Shrewsbury and began arresting or expelling the Puritan clergy. Ottley invited Charles I to come to Shrewsbury and the royal army occupied the town from 20 September to 12 October. Moving south, the king paused at Bridgnorth to issue a proclamation ordering the arrest of "some persons of good quality," whom he intended to put on trial for high treason. Only three were named and Mackworth senior was one of them. The family's home and estates were sequestered by the royalists, and apparently under Ottley's control, as it was he who later received correspondence on the matter from Dorothy Gorton, young Humphrey's paternal grandmother, and also the widow of Ottley's uncle, whose jointure properties had been confiscated. It is not clear exactly where and how family life continued over the succeeding two or three years, as the elder Humphrey was constantly mobile, participating in Parliamentarian county committees and their offshoots all over the West Midlands, and helping to organise the reconquest of Shropshire from an initial foothold at Wem. However, he was in London for a considerable time early in 1644, in connection with the trial of Archbishop William Laud. Humphrey's elder brother, Thomas, was admitted to Gray's Inn, their father's Inn of Court, on 6 February 1645, so it is possible the family took refuge in the capital while the war was at its height in Shropshire. However, the published record of Thomas's admission to Gray's Inn calls him the "son and heir of Humphrey M., of the city of Coventry," which perhaps shows that city was regarded as the normal residence of the Mackworths. The supposition is strengthened by Parliament's reprimand to Mackworth senior later in the year for spending too much time in Coventry, where he was the steward, the senior record keeper and archivist of the city.

With the capture of Shrewsbury by the Parliamentarians in February 1645, Mackworth senior was acclaimed governor by his colleagues of the Shropshire committee, although he had to wait until June 1646 for confirmation by Parliament. At some stage, as a degree of security was established, the family probably joined him at Shrewsbury, although there were still royalist uprisings. The most serious threat came in 1651 with the appearance of Charles Stuart at the head of a large Scottish army, to whom Colonel Mackworth refused to surrender. It is known that Thomas was a captain commanding a garrison troop at Shrewsbury in the days preceding the arrival of the Scots. It is likely that Humphrey too gained military experience around this time: certainly he was paid as a captain during the first year of his governorship.

== Political emergence ==
However Mackworth junior's most important early appointments were legal, not military. He seems to have been appointed town clerk of Shrewsbury in 1652 and was certainly active in the post during the following year. Unlike Thomas, he had no previous legal training and so was admitted to Gray's Inn on 19 November 1652. It is possible that he was at least offered the post of recorder, a post previously held by his father. However, it was Thomas Jones who was to serve as recorder through the younger Humphrey's governorship.

Colonel Mackworth was appointed to the Protector's Council in February 1654 and he and his wife were given a government mews house in London. His commitments in London were heavy and must have necessitated a trustworthy deputy in Shrewsbury.

Oliver Cromwell decided on a parliamentary experiment later in the year, and elections were held under the Instrument of Government for a single-chamber legislature with a new distribution of seats and a £200 property qualification. Mackworth senior was returned as one of the four MPs for Shropshire while the younger Humphrey was one of the two representatives for Shrewsbury. According to Hilda Johnstone, he "apparently played no great part," as with his other stints in parliamentary. However, on 26 September "Mr Mackworth" was appointed to a very important committee, reviewing the future of the army and navy and on 5 October to a committee on elections in Ireland. Johnstone credits both of these to Mackworth senior, but he was elsewhere given his rank of Colonel, so they seem more likely to have figured the younger Humphrey. A deadlock between the mainly Presbyterian parliament and the Protector meant that no legislation was passed. After subjecting its members to a hectoring closing speech, Cromwell prorogued the parliament in January 1655.

== Governor of Shrewsbury ==
Colonel Mackworth died intestate in London some time in late December 1654, while the parliament was not yet dissolved, and was buried on 26 December in Westminster Abbey. The younger Humphrey seems to have succeeded smoothly as effective governor of Shrewsbury. He describes himself in action, confidently making decisions and issuing orders, in a letter to John Thurloe, Secretary to the Protector's Council and Cromwell's spy chief, on 8 March 1655.

=== The royalist rising of 1655 ===
The occasion for Mackworth's copious correspondence with Thurloe was an attempted royalist uprising in Shropshire. The royalist strategy was to draw out Protectorate forces from the capital before launching more serious uprisings in Kent, Surrey and London itself. However, the overall plan was betrayed to Cromwell by Sir Richard Willis, 1st Baronet, a double agent and the local garrisons warned. The tactics for Shropshire and the Welsh Marches were revealed to a local Parliamentarian in a note from an informer received on 7 March, the day before the planned rising, and passed on to the authorities. A "troope or smalle army of cavalleers," under Sir Arthur Blaney, was to eliminate Parliamentarian gentry in the Oswestry area before seizing Chirk Castle. Larger parties, under Sir Thomas Harris of Boreatton and Ralph Kynaston of Llansantffraid-ym-Mechain, were to surprise and take Shrewsbury. Cromwell had written to William Crowne, the husband of Mackworth's aunt, on 5 March, "it being justly apprehended that the Cavalier party intends speedy execution of a very evil design in the parts about Shrewsbury, which they specially intend because of the weakness of the garrison, and the multitude of Malignants thereabouts," that reinforcements were on the way, together with commissions to raise more troops, and that he was to join Mackworth at Shrewsbury. This letter too arrived the night before the rising.

Mackworth wrote to warn Sir Thomas Middleton at Chirk Castle and summoned reinforcements from Hereford but, as the matter was becoming too urgent to wait, he and Crowne were thrown back on their own resources to disrupt the royalist arrays. Mackworth called in all the Castle garrison, placed checkpoints on all the town gates and sited artillery in commanding positions. Crowne mobilised, at his own expense, a force of 50 infantry and cavalry, made up friends from Shrewsbury and the immediate area, which served until the main cavalry reinforcements arrived a full ten days later: the total cost was £37, which Crowne reclaimed from State coffers the following July. Mackworth requisitioned twenty horse for a raid on Boreatton, hoping to seize the ringleaders before the royalists could assemble their forces. A short first-hand account of the affair was given some years later in a petition of John Evanson of Shrewsbury to Richard Cromwell:

In the insurrection of March 1655, the judges were seized upon at Salisbury assizes, and the same design was carrying on in several parts of England. On information that Sir Thos. Harris, living 5 miles from Shrewsbury, was ready to head a party of horse and foot, I and others were sent to apprehend him. We found him with 20 others in arms, 20 horse with saddles fitted for holsters, 14 cases of pistols, and a barrel of gunpowder, and after some opposition, we seized him and 7 others—the rest escaping through by-ways—and brought them to Shrewsbury, whence he was sent to London, and committed to the Tower. His estate being sequestered by the Commissioners for securing the peace, I was entrusted with the management of it; but after 2 years, he obtained leave to return home, and now he distrains his tenants for the money received by me. I beg a speedy course for their relief and indemnity.'

The attempt on Chirk Castle also was foiled. By 9 March Kynaston had been captured and revealed under interrogation by Thomas Lloyd, High Sheriff of Montgomeryshire, that the plotters had intended to gain access to Shrewsbury by sending in soldiers in female dress to pose as sight-seers to help secure the gates. The town was then to be seized by a much larger number of royalists, who would be concealed as drinkers in the surrounding ale-houses. However, measures against the rebels were soon hampered by the regime's habitual parsimony. On 10 March Crown wrote to Cromwell, reporting that Harris still denied involvement in any plot, but that many local people wanted the conspirators pursued, something he was keen to do if he only had the money and manpower. Half of Cromwell's promised reinforcements had arrived on the day of the uprising, but too late to act: the other half had not yet arrived from Derby. Mackworth wrote to Colonel Philip Jones, a member of the Protector's Council, to beg his intercession for more resources, as they had insufficient forces even to guard the prisoners. However, he admitted that he had rounded up some who were simply well-known royalist sympathisers rather than actual suspects.

Mackworth and Crowne began to question witnesses and suspects. Some, like Joseph Jenkes of Frankwell were informers keen to incriminate neighbours and acquaintances. Others, like John Griffiths of Stanwardine in the Field, had small but useful pieces of information about Harris and the other plotters. Some of the gentry, like Edward Vaughan, had heard a great deal of the activities of the main plotters, but had actually witnessed little. However, Arthur Vaughan, his brother was able to confirm that Kynaston had been recruiting plotters in the alehouses. And so it went on, with John Thurloe receiving numerous reports during the latter part of March and April. Reynolds wrote to Thurloe on 17 March, praising Mackworth's zeal: "The young governour hath behaved himselfe verry discreetly and faithfully, and will, I hope, receive encouragement in these his hopefull beginings." Although some of those detained later alleged torture, little real evidence emerged, partly because Mackworth's prompt action had itself prevented large numbers from committing themselves to the rising. Even those who were clearly guilty were treated leniently, as Evanson's report made clear of Harris, who suffered only two years' sequestration of his estates. He was too well-connected for serious punishment because he had married a daughter of the illustrious Parliamentarian Major General Mytton, as later did Thomas Mackworth. Harris's confidant Eyton escaped from Shrewsbury prison down a bedsheet, although wearing leg-irons: an incident for which Mackworth apologised to Oliver Cromwell in August.

To ensure the garrison itself was less open to local influence, on 10 April Cromwell ordered a company from Worcester to replace the Shrewsbury company, although the Worcester men arrived late and Mackworth was still trying on 24 July to get arrears of pay for their predecessors. Later that day the Protector's Council decided to make him head of a further company of soldiers, who were to be sent to him. Meanwhile, he and his designated second-in-command were to be paid as captain and lieutenant. On 13 September the Council noted that funding for this company was yet to be provided and resolved to put the matter right. In so doing, it accorded Mackworth the title Colonel, perhaps for the first time officially.

=== The Ottley case ===
In October 1655 Mackworth wrote to Richard Ottley warning of a petition that had been lodged with Cromwell against him. The relationship between the Ottley family and the Mackworths was at least ambivalent. Although related by both blood and marriage, the elder Humphrey Mackworth and Sir Francis Ottley had taken radically opposed stances during the Civil War and participated closely in the sequestration of each other's estates. There may have been a continuing feud, as Mackworth seems to have been behind one or more attempts to pursue Sir Francis in the law courts under the Commonwealth.

According to Mackworth's letter, Richard Ottley was facing a large claim for compensation from a Mary Moloy. She was, according to her petition, the daughter of a hero of the Nine Years' War in Ireland and the widow of Hugh Lewis, a London goldsmith. In a letter to Ottley, Mackworth alleged that during the Civil War Sir Francis Ottley had confiscated from Lewis jewellery worth £600. When Moloy later sued him, Sir Francis had offered £300 as compensation. After his death she had pursued the matter with Richard, his son and successor, who had given her nothing. Her petition to Cromwell had resulted in the matter being referred to Mackworth on 13 October for him to find a speedy resolution or else report back. Mackworth required Ottley either to return to Shrewsbury or otherwise come to a settlement with Moloy. Referring to the uprisings, he recommended Ottley to come to an arrangement, as he would "find his Highness so far Exasperated to the King's party or any that did Adhere to him that upon Mrs. Molloy's proofe of her Petition I am very Confident he and his Councell will Adjudge her the Whole, which how you will be able to withstand I know not."

Some hard negotiation must have followed as Ottley ended by paying Moloy the much smaller sum of £60: Moloy's receipt, dated 28 November 1655 and foreswearing all future claims, is preserved in his papers. It is unclear whether the younger Humphrey Mackworth was pursuing a family feud as the available evidence is insufficient to show whether he had encouraged Moloy to bring the action or was simply trying to find a fair settlement. It seems unlikely that he considered the Ottleys easy to intimidate, as both Richard and his brother Adam were fellow members of Gray's Inn, at least as well versed in the law as himself.

=== Order and dissolution ===
Much of Mackworth's work was probably fairly mundane. On 23 April 1655 he made his first recorded appearance on the magistrate's bench at the quarter sessions in Shrewsbury. He appeared at the remaining sessions of the year, on 17 July and at Michaelmas, alongside his brother Thomas and various Roundhead veterans like Robert Corbet of Stanwardine and Lancelot Lee. The business was varied, including much that could be seen as local government alongside the administration of justice: cautions and warrants for good behaviour, appointment of a gaol keeper for Bridgnorth and constables for Walford and Yockleton, orders for payment of arrears and support of illegitimate children, settlement of vagrants, repairs to churches and bridges, ale licences. There were other small but important matters. In September Mackworth helped Richard Swayne, a Shrewsbury butcher, to obtain justice. Swayne was imprisoned for debt, yet was owed £4 8s. 8d. (equivalent to £839 in 2025) annually by the State because a patch of his land had been taken to extend the fortifications of Shrewsbury Castle. He had received only £20 in 11 years: the outstanding rent would see him released from prison. Mackworth supported his petition and the Protector's Council resolved he or his wife should receive £20 (equivalent to £3,786 in 2025) forthwith.

Later in the year there began a short-lived break in the normal pattern of administration, the Rule of the Major-Generals. James Berry, an Independent, was appointed the regional representative of central government and arrived in Shrewsbury on 28 November and leaving on a tour of inspection on 3 December: both arrival and departure were celebrated by the mayor and aldermen with expensive feasts at inns in the town. By the time he returned in early January, he had formed a poor opinion of Shropshire's governing class:

I have mustered and payd the troops in this place, and have now begun to looke into the civell affaires of this county, which truely I find to be much out of order; and In your last commission for the peace, if I may be bold to tell you soe, you have furnished us with some men not to be desired; but I hope ere longe to find them out. I beseech you be carefull in disposeing powers and places, to put them into good hands, or you undoe us. We have such a pittifull company of officers in state affaires that it is a shame to see it, excisemen, treasurers, clerke of the peace, pronotaries, stewards, bayliefes and captaines...I am filled with complaints of them, and when I can have while to search them out, shall trouble you with an account of them. In the meane time all I beg is, you would be carefull what new ones you make.

Berry went on to commend Thomas Hunt, a steadfast committee man of the Civil War period, who was a Presbyterian, but a man he considered reliable. He persuaded Hunt to become Sheriff. There was no specific criticism of Mackworth but Berry never mentioned him, which was criticism enough. On 12 December he sent a self-congratulatory letter to Thurloe, remarking:

I am now at last become civell, and have taken my place amongst such magistrates, in the quarter sessions at Sallop; where hath beene the greatest appearance that hath beene seene there for many cessions; and that you may see who were there, and what hearth they have for reformattion, I have sent you the coppy of an order or declaration, that we made and subscribed and read publiquely, and have promised effectually to observe, which if we and all others would doe, I am perswaded it would suppresse one halfe of the deboistnes and prophane practices of this nation. Some other acts of juſtice have beene done, which give men some hopes, that reformation may be wrought, some dissatisfyed juſtices are resolved to give us assiſtance, and we are not without hopes, that magistrates shal be a terrour to evill doers, and a prayſe to them that doe well.

There was indeed a slightly larger attendance by the justices of the peace at the January quarter sessions—15, compared with 12 in October, although there had been only 4 the previous January. However, those who attended were regulars. Berry made the justices sign several public declarations and the one he refers to in his letter may have been against undesirable ale-houses, which was signed by Mackworth, Mytton, Corbet and several others. Berry railed against Roman Catholics and, like other Puritans, was fearful and suspicious of the Quakers, who had preachers active in Shrewsbury in 1656.

However, the Major-Generals were retired early the next year and little came of Berry's reforming zeal. Mackworth apparently did not share it in great measure and meanwhile seems to have become happily attached to the town of Shrewsbury, giving up all larger ambition. This was illustrated by a conversation he had with John Bampfield, formerly an enthusiastic royalist but later a supporter of the Protectorate. Accused of further disloyalty, Bampfield reported:

Being with the governor of Shrewsbury 14 days ago, he told me that Hopton had endeavoured to draw him to the royal party, assuring him that Charles Stuart had 17,000 men at the water side. I answered that when I left France 3 weeks ago, he had not 3,000, and I advised him not to trust any of that party, who had been unfaithful to each other, and advised him to marry some relation of those in power about his Highness, and to take active service if the English engaged in any foreign war, as being more honourable than shutting himself up in a garrison; but he said he liked his garrison, and should keep it if he could. I advised him to go oftener to Court, and spend his leisure at Whitehall, and give up some dissolute company he kept. This was all our discourse, and I appeal to the world whether it deserves banishment or imprisonment.

It seems that it was Mackworth himself who raised suspicions of Bampfield, who continued to assert his own loyalty.

== Member of Parliament ==
Mackworth was again MP for Shrewsbury in the Second Protectorate Parliament of 1656–8, which was elected under the Instrument of Government, like its predecessor, although with results markedly more favourable to the government. There is a possibility of confusing him in the records with his brother Thomas, who sat for Shropshire, but there are few mentions of Mackworth in the House of Commons Journal for the parliament. One definite appointment was on 27 September 1656 to a committee considering an Act for the Increase and Preservation of Timber.

Mackworth was also returned to a Parliament, with the old, unreformed distribution of seats and a small upper chamber, that assembled to hear an opening address from Richard Cromwell on 27 January 1659. Once again, he played little part in the proceedings, although an incident shortly before the parliament was dissolved starkly revealed his financial difficulties. On 9 April 1659, after noting huge holes in the accounts, the House of Commons resolved to call to account all the Farmers of the Excise of Beer and Ale who lived in or near London at two days notice. These were the contractors who collected the tax for the government and included numerous MPs and officials. Mackworth held the farm for Lancashire and a summons was delivered to his landlord at his lodgings. The next sitting of the house, on 11 April, duly noted that he owed £822 10s. – a very large sum but the lowest of those listed, although many of the rest were owed by consortia of excise farmers. Mackworth stood to announce that he had paid in more than £200 that day and promised to pay the remainder within two weeks. However, the parliament came into conflict with the army. Under threat of a coup led by Charles Fleetwood, Richard Cromwell dissolved the parliament on 22 April.

== Disappearance ==
The Protectorate was now in crisis and a revival of royalist feeling was evident in Shropshire. As early as October 1658 Mackworth had organised a petition to the Council, complaining of the seditious activities of John Tench, a local royalist who was now agitating openly. More worrying, however, was that John Betton, the mayor, had begun to install Tench and other royalists in public office. However, when Mackworth himself was replaced, some time in late 1659, it was with Edmund Waring, a steadfast Puritan and Commonwealth man who was to suffer repeated persecution after the triumph of Charles II, often at the hands of Richard Ottley. Mackworth seems to have signed for his final instalment of pay as governor on 27 September, covering the period up to 31 August 1659. A brief note of quarter sessions held in May 1660 shows him appearing as a justice of the peace for the last time: the justices dealt with petitions from five paupers. He served the Commonwealth to the bitter end and disappeared. After the Restoration he was never mentioned again in public records. Even the date of his death is unknown.

== Family ==
No children of Mackworth are known. Bampfield's reported comments show that Mackworth was unmarried at least until 1657 and there is no record of his marrying thereafter. As a younger son of an intestate father, his marriage prospects among the local gentry would have been limited and Bampfield's encouragement to look for a political marriage was probably sincere. However, Bampfield also remarks on his "dissolute company," which seems to have escaped the notice of the observant, frank and humorous James Berry. This raises the possibility of secret extra-marital relationships, possibly homosexual.

== Footnotes ==
Parliament of England
Preceded by Shrewsbury not represented in Barebones Parliament.	Member of Parliament for Shrewsbury; 1654-9; With: Richard Cheshire 1654 First Protectorate Parliament; Samuel Jones 1656-8 Second Protectorate Parliament; William Jones 1659 Third Protectorate Parliament	Succeeded by Samuel Jones; Thomas Jones
