= Thomas Mackworth =

English politician

Thomas Mackworth (1627–1696) of Betton Strange was an English politician of Shropshire landed gentry background. After limited military service on the Parliamentarian side in the Third English Civil War, he represented Shropshire in the House of Commons from 1656 to 1659 during the Second and Third Protectorate Parliaments.

== Background and early life ==
Thomas Mackworth was the eldest son of

- Humphrey Mackworth of Betton Strange, just south of Shrewsbury. The Mackworths' origins lay in Mackworth, near Derby, and were related to the Mackworth baronets, originally of Mackworth Castle although they moved to Normanton, Rutland in the 17th century. Humphrey's junior branch of the family had held Betton Strange, a manor a few miles south of the town, since 1544 and were deeply involved in the politics and commerce of Shrewsbury.
- Anne Waller, Mackworth's first wife, who had married him by May 1624. She was the daughter of Thomas Waller of Beaconsfield, who seems to have been the owner of the estate known as Gregory's Manor or Butler's Court in the early 17th century. She was related to the poet Edmund Waller, who belonged to another branch of the family in Beaconsfield. However, the Waller's originated in Kent so the Parliamentarian general William Waller was a very distant kinsman.

It is unlikely that Thomas Mackworth was born at Betton Strange. St Chad's Church, Shrewsbury, was the parish church which covered the area and his christening is not included in its parish register. His year of birth is generally given as 1627, although ODNB raises a very slight doubt by giving it as c.1628. Owen and Blakeway's 1825 History of Shrewsbury includes an abstract from an earlier manuscript listing monuments in the old churchyard: important, as the church fell down in 1788 and was replaced by a building on a new site. The monument to Thomas Mackworth and his wife apparently recorded that he was in his 70th year when he died in 1696, tending to validate 1627 as his birth year. His brother, Humphrey Mackworth, was born in 1631 and the first of three sisters, Anne, in 1632 Their mother died in 1636 and was buried at St Chad's on 26 May. Humphrey Mackworth subsequently married and had further children by Mary Venables, the daughter of Thomas Venables of Kinderton in Cheshire.

Thomas Mackworth's childhood and youth were shaped throughout by his father's developing career and commitments. At the time of Thomas's birth, Humphrey Mackworth was a young Gray's Inn lawyer, working in London, although he moved back and began to represent the town of Shrewsbury as his family grew, attaining the rank of alderman in 1633. The family was by this time noted as Puritan: in autumn of the same year Humphrey Mackworth was one of twenty family heads who were denounced during a canonical visitation as "wilful refusers to communicate for the gestures sake." because they persistently refused to bow at the name of Jesus or to kneel at the altar rail.

== Education ==
Thomas Mackworth's education shadowed his father's: Shrewsbury School, the University of Cambridge and Gray's Inn. He was admitted to Shrewsbury School, then a noted centre of Calvinist and humanistic education, in 1638. He matriculated as a pensioner or fee-paying student at St Catharine's College, Cambridge at Michaelmas 1642. He was admitted at Gray's Inn, on 6 February 1645 and was awarded BA at Cambridge in 1646.

== The Civil War and Commonwealth ==
Mackworth's further education coincided with the early and, for his family, critical phases of the English Civil War. Humphrey Mackworth was a Parliamentarian from the outset. However, Shrewsbury and most of its county fell into royalist hands and Charles I occupied Shrewsbury with his field army from 20 September 1642. At Bridgnorth on 14 October the king issued a royal proclamation threatening with prosecution for high treason Shropshire gentry who had criticised his government: Humphrey Mackworth was one of only three who were named. Thomas must have moved to university in safely-Parliamentarian Cambridge very soon after the family's flight and the sequestration of their home and estates by the royalists. The records of Thomas's admission to Cambridge and to Gray's Inn both describe him as the son of Humphrey Mackworth of Coventry, where Mackworth senior was employed by the city corporation as steward, so it is likely that this was the family home during these years. It was from Coventry that Parliament's reconquest of the West Midlands was launched, with a series of county committees slowly establishing themselves and federating to provide the framework for a provisional government: the Shropshire committee gained an initial foothold at Wem in the autumn of 1643. By the time Thomas Mackworth was entering Gray's Inn in February 1645, his father and the committee were already involved in plans for the taking of Shrewsbury, an aim they achieved on 21 February 1645. Humphrey Mackworth was acclaimed governor by his committee colleagues, in preference to Thomas Mytton, the successful commander who had been governor of Wem.

Thomas seems to given his father some assistance during the years of his governorship. When Shrewsbury was fortified against the army of Charles II of Scotland in August 1651, Thomas was in charge of a detachment of soldiers in the garrison. He is also known to have helped during 1650–52 in the appointment of Francis Tallents as minister at Mary's church in Shrewsbury, pressing for £50 in London to supplement the £150 salary available in Shrewsbury. This suggests that up to this point he was still fairly closely engaged and well connected in the capital. The situation must have changed, as it had with his father, with marriage and the growth of his family. He married Anne Bulkeley, from a Shropshire gentry family, and their first son, named Bulkeley after his mother's family, was born on 14 December 1653 and baptised at Chad's church a fortnight later. From this point he was closely involved in the government of his native county.

== The Protectorate ==
=== Local government and justice ===
Thomas Mackworth's first recorded appearance as a justice of the peace in Shropshire, alongside his father, was at the quarter sessions of 10 January 1654. The cases considered were fairly typical of the time and included local government matters as well as poor relief, the administration of justice and moral policing. It is possible his debut indicated that Humphrey Mackworth knew that he was to be nominated a member of the Protector's Council the following. Mackworth senior was heavily committed in London from that point and perhaps relied on Thomas to represent him. Thomas appeared on the bench at the next sessions, on 4 April He was not listed as present for the sessions of 11 July. Nevertheless, the magistrates referred to him and Robert Corbet the case of a widow requesting poor relief and appointed him a commissioner of the house of correction, so he was now regarded as an active local justice of the peace. He heads the list of justices at the 3 October 1654 sessions, traditionally linked with Michaelmas but in the record for this year, apparently wrongly, with St. Martin's Day. It was at this session that the justices decided to take a firm line over money owed for the rebuilding of Stokesay parish church, resulting in the construction of one of the very few parish churches in the country dating from the Commonwealth or Protectorate periods. Mackworth missed the Epiphany sessions of 1655, which were held soon after his father's funeral in Westminster Abbey. Humphrey Mackworth senior's death must have been unexpected and he died intestate, probably preoccupying Thomas Mackworth, the heir, in administrative complications and family difficulties. However, for the remaining three quarter sessions of the year both Thomas and his younger brother Humphrey appeared on the bench. Both seem to have remained active even when unable to attend. For example, Thomas was not on the bench at Easter 1657 but those present acted on an order he had issued under the Poor Law.

=== Member of Parliament ===
In 1656, Mackworth was elected Member of Parliament for Shropshire for the Second Protectorate Parliament. This was elected under the Instrument of Government, like the First Protectorate Parliament of 1654–5, and was similarly intended to legitimise the rule of Oliver Cromwell. The election results were more favourable to the government on the second attempt, as senior military figures worked hard to vet candidates and to encourage sympathetic electors. As before, this was a unicameral legislature in which all representatives had to meet a £200 property qualification, and the seats were redistributed according to a system that removed some of the small borough seats and gave four, instead of two, to the counties. Thomas's brother, Humphrey, now addressed as Colonel, represented Shrewsbury in the same parliament and it is not always easy to distinguish them in the parliamentary record. Neither was very prominent. However, it was Mr Mackworth who was appointed to an important committee on an Act for the Security of the Protector's Person on 26 September. It may have been his experience of intestacy, as well as his legal training, that obtained him a place on a committee to discuss an Act for the Probate of Wills a month later. In November he was deputed to help consider the case of John Cole, a case concerning contract and debt that had simmered since 1640 and was to consume a considerable amount of parliamentary time in future. Not until June 1658 did he appear again in the record, as one appointed to a committee on a bill concerning recusants. He seems to have become gradually more involved in the parliamentary process, acting as teller in a number of divisions of the House. One of these was in relation to a Bill for Preventing Multiplicity of Buildings, which was intended to tackle a serious shortage of housing by preventing wealthy householders annexing neighbouring properties to their own.

He was re-elected MP for Shropshire in 1659 for the Third Protectorate Parliament, once again accompanying his brother to Westminster. This went back to the old, unreformed distribution of seats and had a small upper chamber. Richard Cromwell delivered its opening address on 27 January. The following day a Mr Mackworth, probably Thomas, was appointed to its important Privileges committee. However, the parliament was short-lived and Thomas Mackworth played little further part in its proceedings before Cromwell dissolved the parliament on 22 April, fearing that Charles Fleetwood, was about to launch a coup.

== Restoration ==
By now the Protectorate regime was itself dissolving. Mackworth's last recorded appearance at the Shropshire quarter sessions before the restoration of the monarchy was on 12 July 1659.

Thomas Mackworth's identification with the Cromwellian regime had not been as complete as his brother Humphrey's. While Humphrey disappeared as Charles II appeared, Thomas seems to have been largely content to settle into private life. By 1668 he was sufficiently rehabilitated to be selected as Sheriff of the county for the following year. However, it took the Glorious Revolution to bring him back to the bench. He appeared at the quarter sessions of July 1689 Thereafter he was a regular and active member of the bench until October 1696, a month before his death.

== Marriage and family ==
Mackworth twice and had issue by both wives.

Anne Bulkeley, daughter of Richard Bulkeley of Buntingsdale, Shropshire, was Mackworth's first wife. The children of this marriage included:

- Bulkeley Mackworth (1653–1731), an important Shropshire landowner.
- Anne Mackworth (born 1656), who married Edward Minshull of Stoke, Cheshire.
- Sir Humphrey Mackworth (1657–1727), industrialist in Wales, Tory MP, fraudster and constitutional writer.

Anne died in 1666 and was buried at St Chad's on 27 April.

Sarah Mytton, daughter of General Thomas Mytton was Mackworth's second wife. They married at St Chad's on 29 September 1674. This marriage produced a daughter:

- Dorothy (born 1677), who married William Taylor of Rodington, Shropshire.

Sarah Mackworth outlived her husband, died on 28 August 1698 and was buried at St Chad's on 3 September.

== Death ==
Thomas Mackworth died on 12 November 1696 and was buried at St Chad's on 19 November.

== Footnotes ==
Parliament of England
Preceded by Humphrey Mackworth; Thomas Mytton; Robert Corbet; Philip Young	Member of Parliament for Shropshire; 1656–1659; With: Samuel More 1656; Andrew Lloyd 1656; Philip Young 1656–1659	Succeeded by Not represented in Restored Rump
