= Humphrey Mackworth (Parliamentarian) =

English lawyer and politician, died 1654

Parliamentarian military governor of Shrewsbury
- In office March 1645 but not appointed by House of Commons until 2 June 1646 – December 1654

Vice Chamberlain of Chester
- In office 1648–1654

Deputy chief justice of the Chester circuit
- In office 1649–1654

Member of Protector's Council
- In office September 1654 – December 1654

Member of First Protectorate Parliament for Shropshire
- In office 7 February 1654 – December 1654

Personal details
- Born: 27 January 1603 Betton Strange, Shropshire
- Died: December 1654 (aged 51) London
- Spouses: Anne Waller; Mary Venables
- Children: 8, including Thomas and Humphrey
- Relatives: Humphrey Mackworth (grandson); Bulkeley Mackworth (grandson); Sir Francis Ottley (cousin)
- Profession: Lawyer, politician, soldier, judge, landowner.

Humphrey Mackworth (27 January 1603 – December 1654) was an English lawyer, judge, and politician of Shropshire landed gentry origins who rose to prominence in the Midlands, the Welsh Marches and Wales during the English Civil War. He was the Parliamentarian military governor of Shrewsbury in the later phases of the war and under The Protectorate. He occupied several important legal and judicial posts in Chester and North Wales, presiding over the major trials that followed the Charles Stuart's invasion in 1651. In the last year of his life, he attained national prominence as a member of Oliver Cromwell's Council and as a Member of the House of Commons for Shropshire in the First Protectorate Parliament.

== Origins and background ==
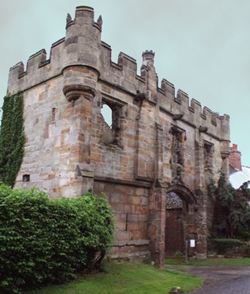
The gatehouse of Mackworth Castle.

Humphrey Mackworth was born on 27 January 1603. He was the eldest child and only son of

- Richard Mackworth of Betton Strange, Shropshire. The Mackworths were a minor gentry family, settled just to the south of Shrewsbury, but with other property in the county. Their name comes from Mackworth, a village in Derbyshire, where Mackworth Castle was at that time home to the Mackworth baronets, although they later relocated to Rutland. Richard's great-great-grandfather, Thomas Mackworth, founded the Shropshire branch of the family, acquiring Meole Brace, just south of Shrewsbury, through marriage to a cousin of Lord Zouche. One of his younger sons, John Mackworth, made his way up through the commerce and politics of Shrewsbury, buying Betton in 1544.
- Dorothy Cranage, daughter of Lawrence Cranage of Keele, near Newcastle-under-Lyme, in the neighbouring county of Staffordshire.

Humphrey Mackworth had two younger sisters: Margaret, who married William Juckes, and Agnes, who married William Crowne, proprietor of Nova Scotia.

Richard Mackworth was buried at St Chad's Church, Shrewsbury on 22 May 1617 and his wife Dorothy secured control of his estates. She then married Adam Ottley of London, son of Richard Ottley of Pitchford Hall, Shropshire, by whom she had another son, and, after his death, she married John Gorton.

== Education and training ==
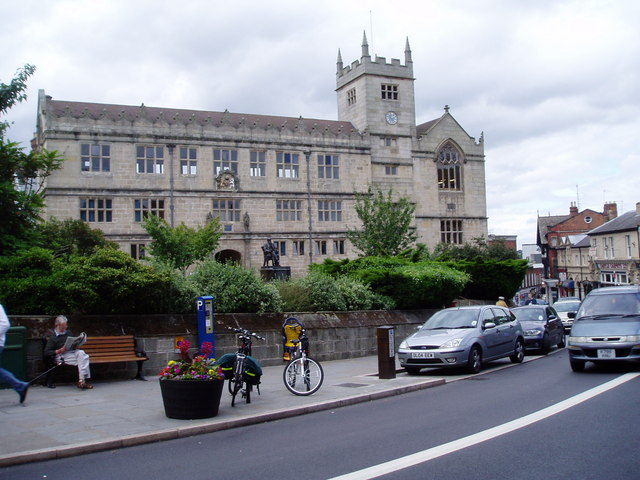
Shrewsbury School's original building, which now serves as Shrewsbury's library.

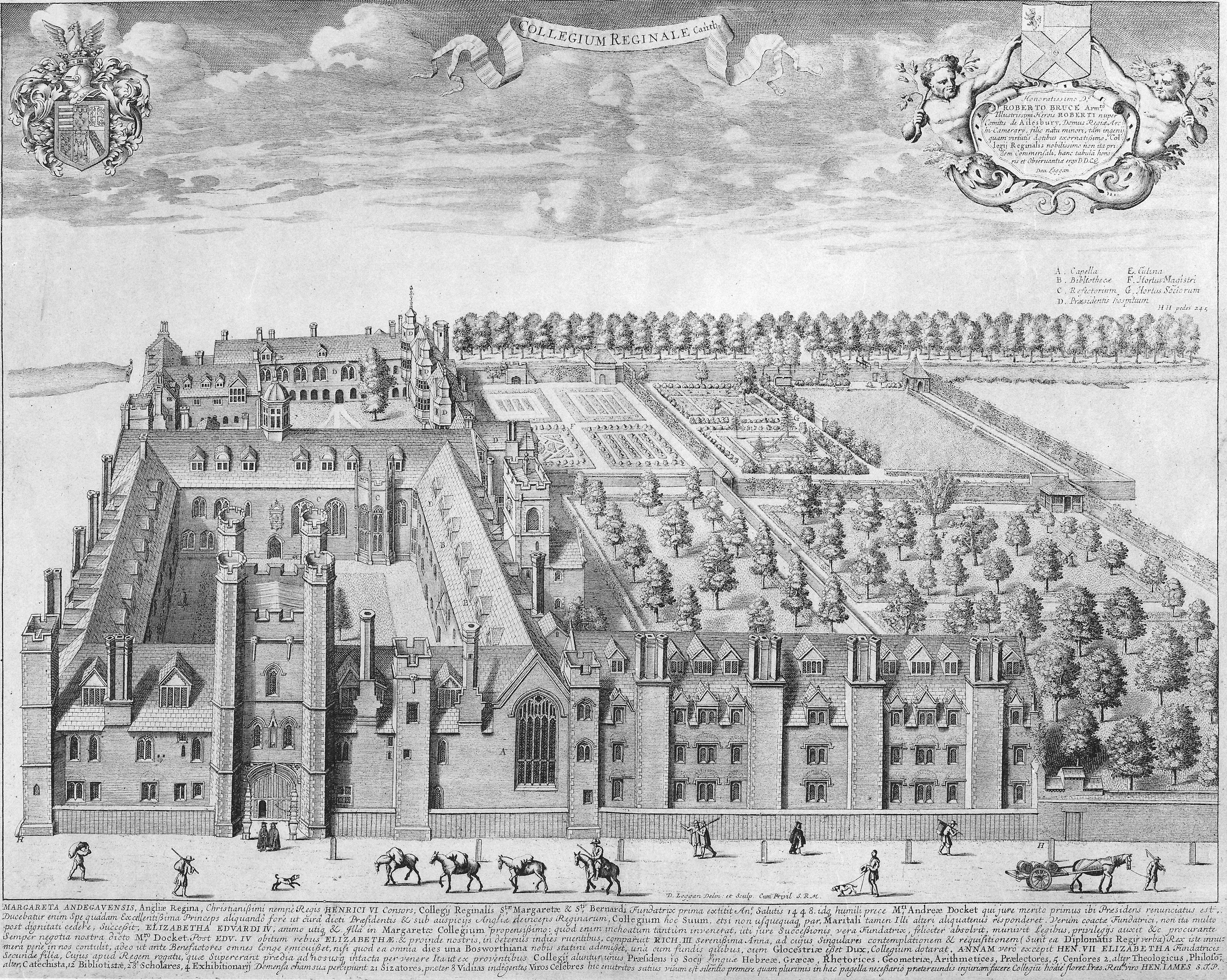
Queens' College, Cambridge, as pictured by David Loggan, 1690.

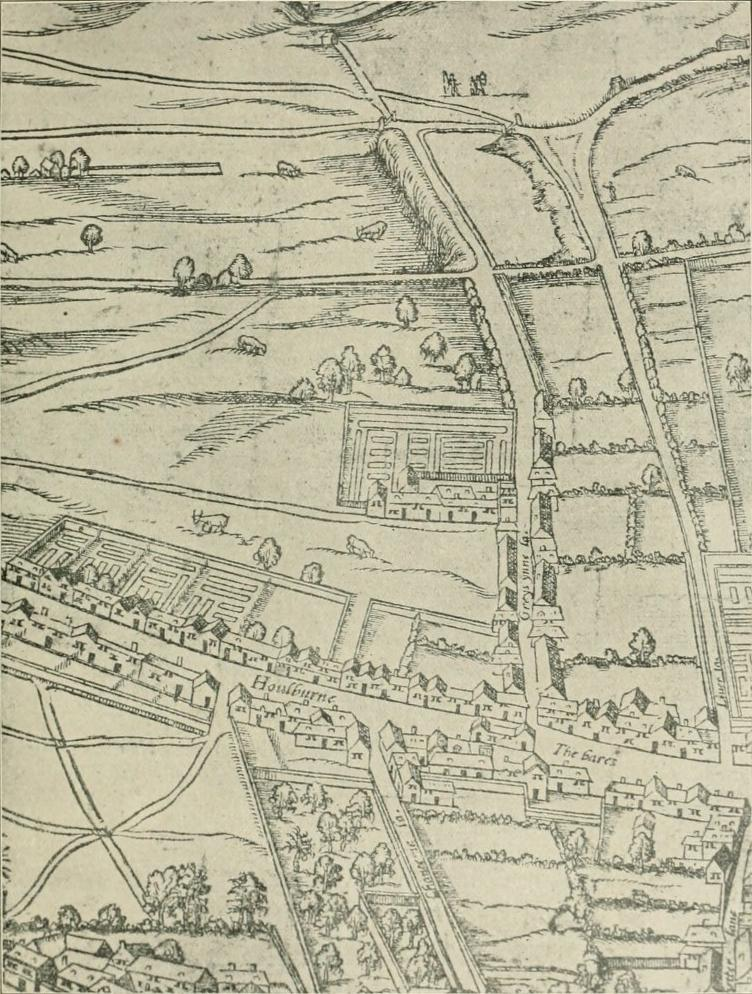
Gray's Inn, in an enclosed area to the left of "Greys ynne la.", shown on the "Woodcut" map of London of the 1560s.

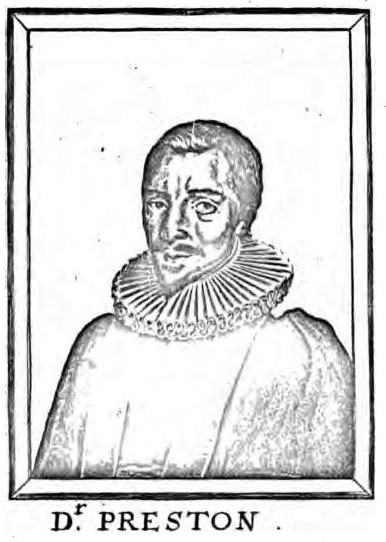
John Preston, Puritan preacher, from Samuel Clarke's Generall Martyrologie, 1651. Woodcut, artist unknown.

All three of the educational institutions attended by Mackworth were noted as centres of Calvinist learning. He studied at Shrewsbury School from January 1614. The school had been founded in the reign of Elizabeth I, providing a distinctly Protestant and humanist education, and numbering among its alumni Philip Sidney, as well as sons of the Protestant gentry, like Robert Corbet (died 1583). Mackworth matriculated at Queens' College, Cambridge at Easter 1619 as a Fellow Commoner, a privileged position requiring considerable wealth. At the time the college was popular among some Shropshire gentry circles because of the presence of the puritan preacher John Preston, who was active throughout Mackworth's period of study, leaving to become Master of Emmanuel College in 1622.

Mackworth was admitted for legal training at Gray's Inn on 24 October 1621 and was called to the bar about a decade later. Throughout his period of study the preacher at Gray's Inn was Richard Sibbes, a close associate of Preston. Both promoted a fairly open and inclusive interpretation of Calvinism, which was nevertheless at odds with royal tastes. However, the Inn proved fertile ground and the chapel had to be enlarged to accommodate the audience for Sibbes's sermons in 1624. Mackworth was to achieve eminence in his profession but was clearly not an academic lawyer or jurisprudent and only figures twice in the Pension Book, the records of the presiding council of his Inn of Court: in both cases, he was promoted to a new level of seniority, but only after achieving great offices in the worlds of law and politics. On 24 November 1645 he was called to be an Ancient, a member of the Grand Company of the Inn. On 10 February 1650 the Pension "ordered that Mr. Humphrey Mackworth deputy Cheife Justice of Chester and Vice-Chamberlayne of Chester bee called to the Bench and read in his course before Mr. Fell."

== Legal practice and prelude to civil war ==
Mackworth came into his estates, aged 21, in 1624. He married for the first time, around the same time, to Anne Waller: a son was baptised on 10 September 1629. His family lived at Betton Strange while he practised as a lawyer, dividing his time between Shropshire and London. From 1626 to 1631 he collected reports on cases in the Court of Common Pleas and the Court of King's Bench. In the 1630s he was a lawyer for the town of Shrewsbury itself. In 1633 he was made an alderman of the town, although the position was unconfirmed as the town was awaiting confirmation of its royal charter. During this period of absolute monarchy, known as Thorough, most of the normal political channels for debate and contest were unavailable and both conformity and dissent were vented through ecclesiastical politics.

Betton Strange was in the parish of St Chad's Church, Shrewsbury, then the largest of the town's parishes. There had been a tradition of learned and radically Protestant preaching at St Chad's for some decades. However, Peter Studley, the incumbent (then termed curate) appointed in 1622, although a local man was of the High Church and Arminian persuasion then becoming increasingly influential at Court. Conflict between himself and the congregation escalated as he steadily imposed his views and practices. An episcopal visitation in 1626 found that some parishioners, particularly in St Julian's parish, which Studley also served, objected to his failure to preach and pointed out that, under the Act of Uniformity 1558, they had to attend his services and were not able to hear the preaching provided in neighbouring churches at the same time. Some had begun to gather on Sunday evenings in private houses to hear sermons read: Studley questioned whether these assemblies counted as conventicles. Seven women, including Katherine Chidley, refused to undergo the churching of women: she was later to write polemics in support of Independency and her son Samuel was to become a leading Leveller. However Mackworth's puritan leanings only slowly brought him notoriety. It was during an autumn 1633 visitation by Robert Wright, the Bishop of Lichfield and a close associate of William Laud, that Studley denounced Mackworth among the heads of twenty families. They refused to bow at the name of Jesus or to kneel at the altar rail – a refusal which meant they were "wilful refusers to communicate for the gestures sake." Studley went on to write a bitter polemic against puritanism: The Looking-Glasse of Schisme, published in London in 1634. This focussed on the sensational murder by a young farmer, Enoch ap-Evans of Clun, of his own mother and brother, which Studley claimed was a symptom of his known puritan beliefs. He pointedly referred to what must have been a solid and growing opposition in his own parish, and at the same time conflated puritanism with opposition to monarchy:

Know, good reader, that this towne of Shrewsbury, the place of my birth and residence is greatly troubled with a sect of men and women, with whom I have had much intercourse of concernment, not by way of intimate familiarity approving their ways, but of vexation and trouble of minde, that I could not, in thirteene yeares painfull ministry among them, reclaime them from their wandring fancies, and reduce them to obedience to Supreme majestie, in the persons of two most illustrious and royal kings.

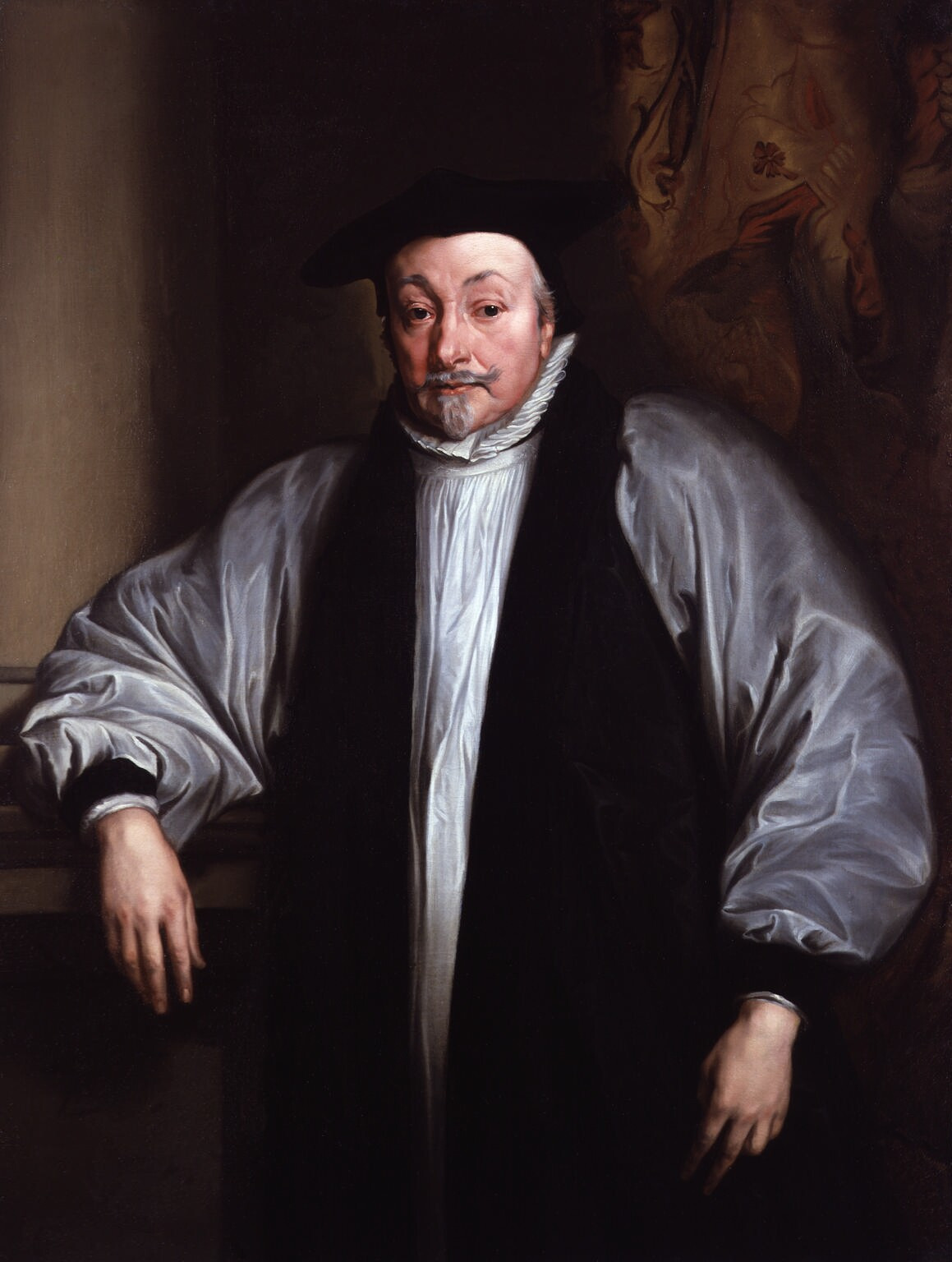
William Laud, the Archbishop of Canterbury, whose intervention in the religious conflicts at St Chad's was later used in his trial.

Richard More, a puritan member of the congregation refuted Studley's allegations in A true relation of the Murders committed in the Parish of Clunne, but could not obtain a licence to publish it until 1641.

In the following year Laud initiated a visitation of all the dioceses in the Province of Canterbury, which was overseen in Staffordshire and Shropshire by Nathaniel Brent. This led to a widespread imposition of "Catholic" features, including altars and images. St Chad's was decorated with religious pictures, illustrating Biblical narratives. Studley, in his moment of triumph, was presented with the opportunity to leave the scene by appointment to a living at Pontesbury. Mackworth was closely involved in the issue of his replacement, as the right of appointment was claimed by the town. The bailiffs duly appointed Richard Poole on 29 March 1637. Close enquiry proved this to be unfounded. There was an old tradition, long since discounted, that St Chad's was a royal chapel, giving the Crown an opportunity to claim it as a royal peculiar. Laud challenged the appointment by a successful quo warranto action, and the living was taken back into royal hands. The issue was then subsumed into the town's renegotiation of its charter, in which Mackworth acted for the corporation. In 1638, a compromise engineered by Sir Richard Newport finally renewed the charter and left Poole in place, expanding the council and giving both the "religious party" of Mackworth and their opponents representation. Mackworth's position as an alderman of Shrewsbury was confirmed. In July of that year he married Mary Venables, his first wife having died in 1636.

Charles I was compelled to call the Short Parliament in 1640, allowing protest to resume political channels. However, Convocation continued in session after the parliament was prorogued, approving a series of canons that included the notorious Etcetera oath, approving a church polity under "archbishops, bishops, deans, and archdeacons &." Mackworth was prominent in organising a protest by Shropshire clergy against the oath. This was part of a wider movement that produced the Root and Branch petition against episcopacy, debated by the Long Parliament.

== The Civil War ==
=== Royalist conquest of Shropshire ===
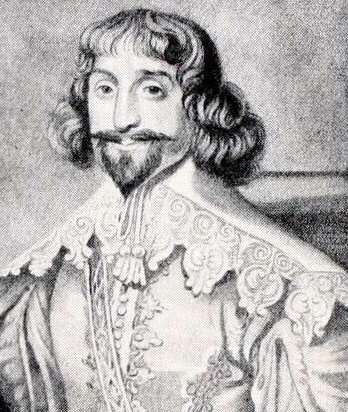
Francis Ottley, first of the royalist governors of Shrewsbury and a relative of Mackworth.

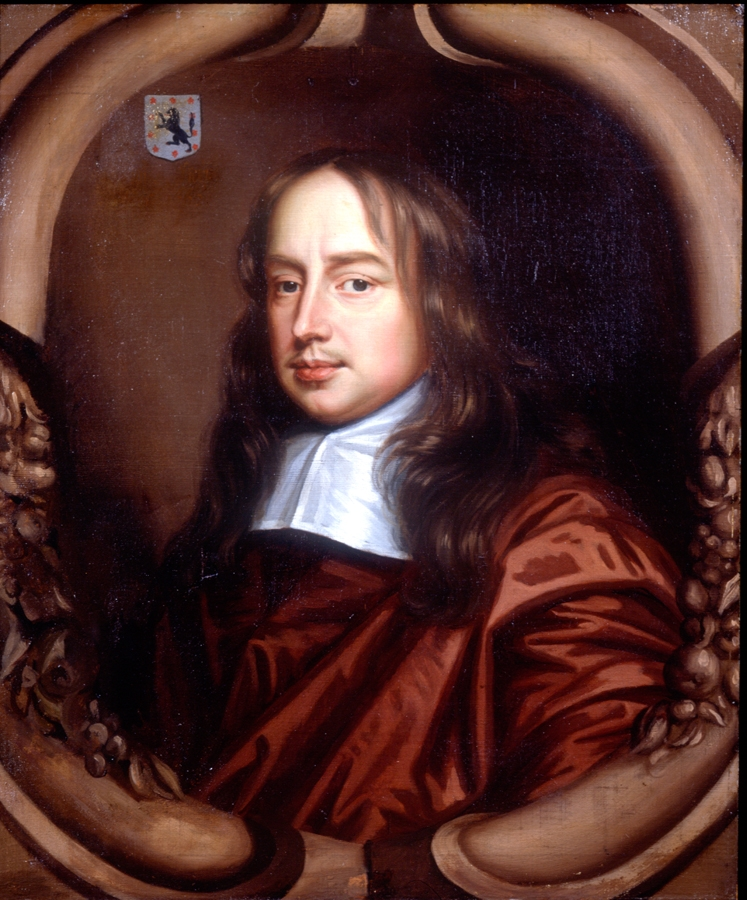
William Pierrepont of Tong Castle, a moderate but steadfast Parliamentarian who seems to have enjoyed the confidence of Mackworth and Cromwell.

As the crisis in relations between King and Parliament escalated towards war, during the summer of 1642, both sides took steps to mobilise forces. Parliament deputed Sir John Corbet, 1st Baronet, of Stoke upon Tern, Richard More and William Pierrepont to take charge in Shropshire but they were forestalled by a more rapid royalist response, initiated primarily by Francis Ottley of Pitchford Hall, At his instigation, the king led the main royalist field army from its initial rallying point at Nottingham to Shrewsbury, which it occupied on 20 September 1642. He knighted Ottley and gave him control of the town, although formal appointment as governor did not come until late January 1643. Ottley was, by the standards of the time, a cousin of Mackworth, as his uncle had married Mackworth's widowed mother: moreover, Ottley's paternal grandmother was Catherine Mackworth of Betton Strange, so they were also second cousins. Despite this and other close relationships with royalist families, Mackworth sided with Parliament from the outset: his name appears, second only to Thomas Mytton, on a list of "the names of the delinquents within the towne and liberties of Shrewsbury", apparently prepared for Ottley in the early days of the royalist military occupation.

The royalist army left Shrewsbury on 12 October, heading for London on a campaign that would culminate in the inconclusive Battle of Edgehill. Its first halt was at Bridgnorth, where the king issued a proclamation "for the better peace of our County of Salop," ordering the arrest of "some persons of good quality," accused of spreading sedition and libel, whom Charles intended to put on trial for high treason. Only three of these were named: Thomas Nichols, Humphrey Mackworth and Thomas Hunt. All three were among those suspended by Shrewsbury Corporation, acting on a letter from the king, from attending further meetings unless and until they could clear their names. Mackworth's lands were sequestered by the royalists, apparently under Ottley's control, to provide funds for their own war effort. Evidently the sequestration was very thorough, but not thought through. The royalist William Browne had acquired an interest in Mackworth's estates through an indenture of mortgage, in return for a loan of £300 to Mackworth. Sequestration deprived him of a substantial income. Early in 1643 Ottley was compelled to issue an order allowing Browne to draw £70 a year from Mackworth's estates. On 31 March Mackworth's mother, Dorothy Gorton, the widow of Ottley's uncle, wrote to Ottley from Sutton Coldfield seeking to recover the rents of part of the sequestered Mackworth estates that she claimed as jointure property. She asked that he "not let me suffer for my sonns esteemed fault."

=== Parliamentarian recovery ===
By this time Mackworth's "esteemed fault" had gone well beyond speaking out of turn. He was appointed to a series of committees and associations, covering Shropshire and neighbouring counties, as Parliament sought to establish a provisional government of the areas captured by the royalists, pending their recapture. On 2 February 1643 the House of Commons of England appointed him to the associated committees covering not Shropshire but Staffordshire and Warwickshire, which included Coventry, where Mackworth held a stewardship. On 24 February, however, it was to a Shropshire committee set up to raise £375 per week for the war effort – a vast sum that was clearly out of the question at this stage, with the county almost entirely in royalist hands. On 27 March he was made a member of the Shropshire parliamentarian sequestration committee. 10 April brought formal recognition of a general parliamentary committee for Shropshire, albeit as part of an Act ordering it to federate with Warwickshire and Staffordshire This act listed the committee members explicitly: the original trio of Corbet, More and Pierrepont were joined by Mackworth, Mytton, Nichols, Andrew Lloyd, Robert Corbet of Stanwardine and other parliamentarian gentry.

Sir William Brereton, Parliament's commander in Cheshire and a valuable ally of the Shropshire committee.

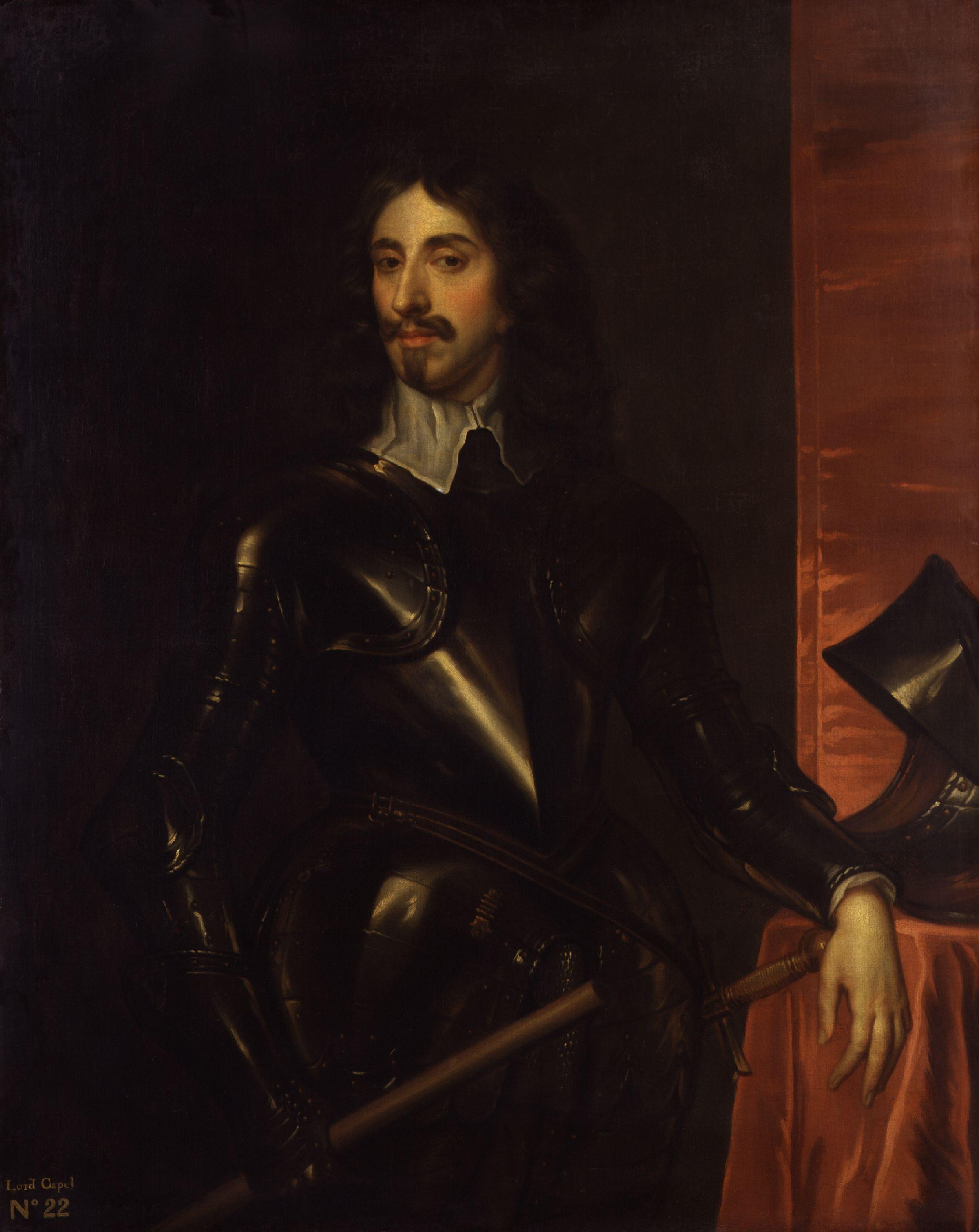
Arthur Capel, 1st Baron Capel, who commanded the royalist armies in the region.

Progress in actually fighting the Shropshire royalists was initially slow – not least because the regional parliamentarian commander, Basil Feilding, 2nd Earl of Denbigh was the object of accusations of disloyalty which he shook off only with difficulty. However, with the help of Sir William Brereton of Cheshire the Shropshire committee seized a foothold in the county at the unfortified market town of Wem, around the end of August 1643. Some of the committee took up residence there, taking with them as temporary chaplain the puritan minister Richard Baxter, who was recruited by Mackworth and Thomas Hunt at Coventry: although Mytton was the military governor at Wem, Baxter referred to the parliamentarian garrison as "Colonel Mackworth's troop." In October the small garrison, with trenches still only partly dug, drove off a full-scale royalist attack, under Lord Capel. An uprising of the townspeople, including women armed with pans, was credited with turning the tide and a popular rhyme declared:

The women of Wem, and a few musketeers,
Beat the Lord Capel, and all his Cavaliers.

Mackworth was present during the royalist assault and seems to have taken part in the fighting.

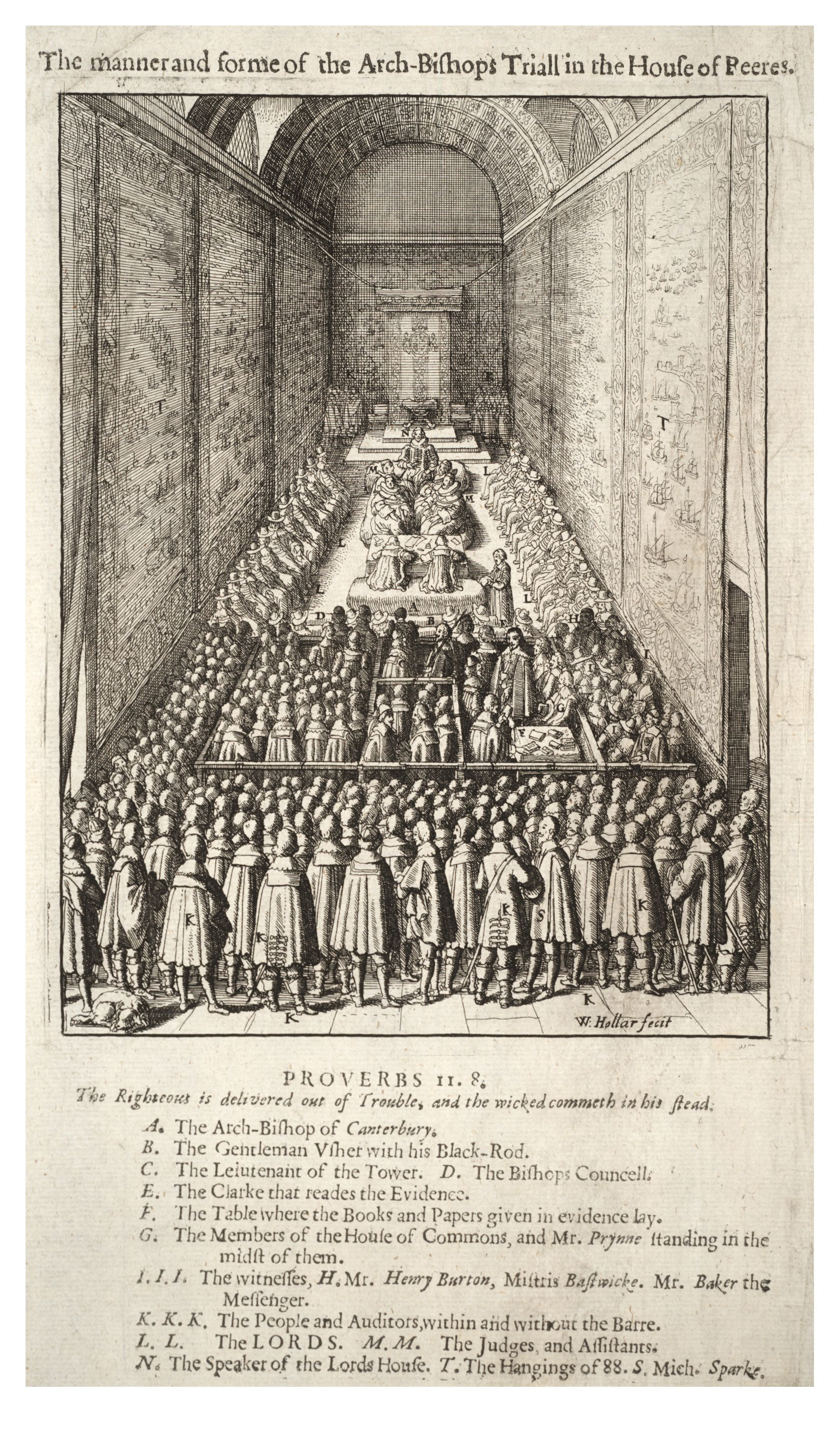
Etching by Wenceslaus Hollar of Laud's trial, which forced Mackworth to go to London in 1644.

The Wem outpost remained under constant threat and only some of the committee risked their own lives by remaining there. Sir John Corbet was mostly in London. Mackworth seems to have been active in the area, as a commissioned captain in the parliamentary army, but was sometimes in Coventry or in London. In December Mackworth, Mytton and others sent a letter from the committee at Wem to the Commons, suggesting that both were present at what was a dangerous time. A damaged letter from the same month, preserved in the state papers and complaining about depredations of the Parliamentarians around Hodnet, name Mackworth, Mytton, Lloyd and Thomas Hunt as "the chief men with us of the Committee." Later in the month Mackworth went to London, where he was due to make depositions against Laud before a House of Lords committee in January 1644. These particularly related to Laud's interference with the town's charter, in a dispute between the town and William Beale, Master of St. John's College, Cambridge, and in the appointment of the head of Shrewsbury School. Meanwhile, the situation in Shropshire became desperate as numerous experienced royalist soldiers, redeployed during a lull in the Irish Confederate Wars, entered the country via Chester. Robert Corbet and Andrew Lloyd, committee members who remained at Wem, wrote to Mackworth, asking him to "represent our forlorne condition to the Parliament, for whom we have desperately engaged our estates and lives." Mytton counter-attacked against the royalists: on 12 January he captured a large royalist ammunition convoy at Ellesmere, Shropshire, along with its commanders. On 18 February Prince Rupert arrived in Shrewsbury, shook up the garrison and then launched a brutal campaign, defeating a force under Mytton at Market Drayton He left on 14 March to relieve Newark. On 27 March Mackworth wrote to Denbigh from Coventry, bemoaning the "bleedinge condition" of Shropshire: unless relief came soon, he averred, he would have to recommend withdrawal to Nantwich or Stafford.

=== Rise to power ===
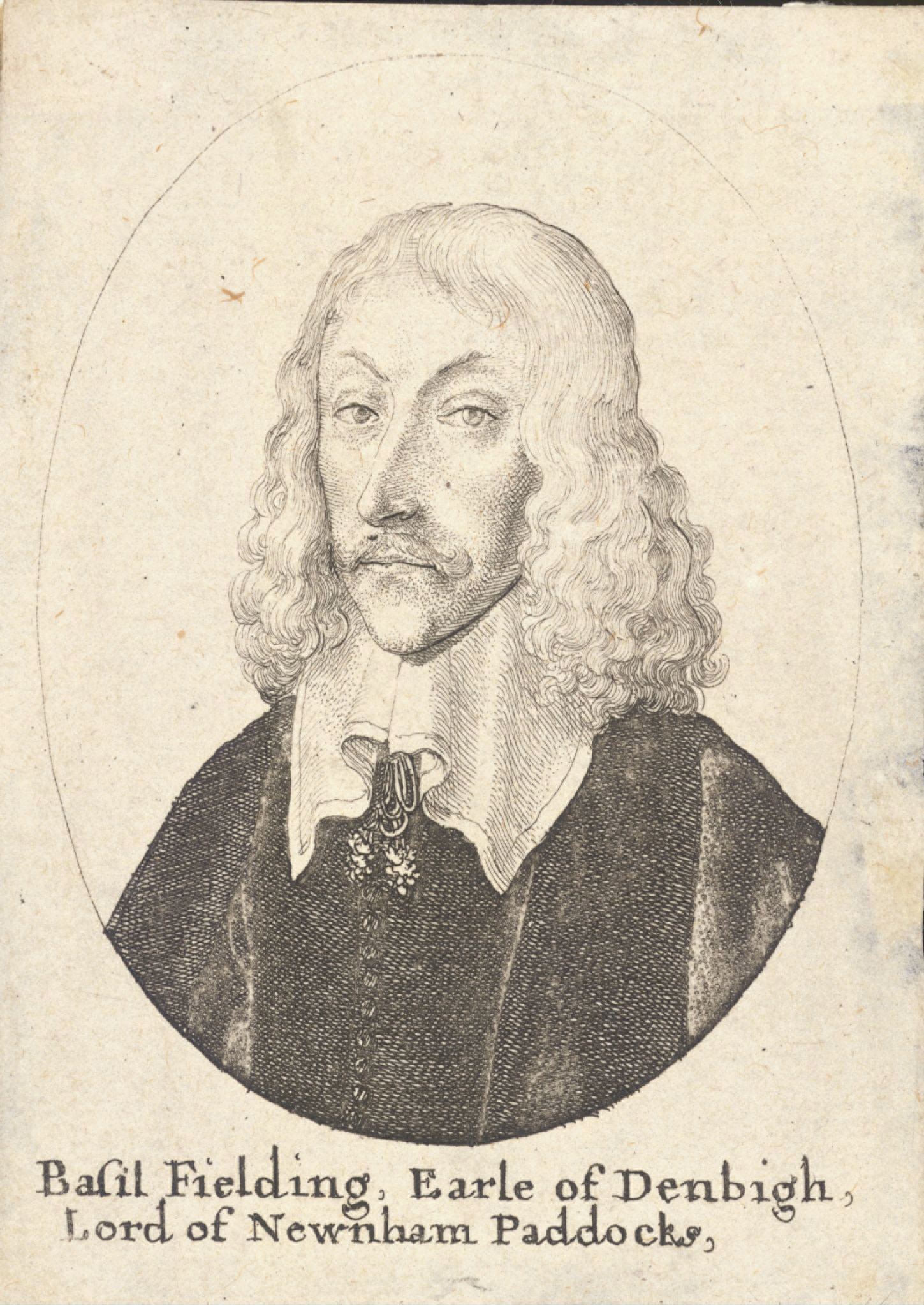
Wenceslas Hollar's portrait of Basil Fielding, 2nd Earl of Denbigh, Parliament's commander in the Midlands, who considered himself socially superior to the gentry county committee men.

Despite a further campaign by Rupert, the garrison at Wem clung on. However divisions began to emerge between the military and the civilians, setting Mytton against the rest of the county committee, which seems to have resented his being in London during this further onslaught: he returned on 24 May – just after Rupert moved away to the relief of York and a shattering defeat at the Battle of Marston Moor. The divisions seem to have worsened even as Mytton and his forces helped win important successes – not least at Oswestry, which he helped Denbigh to take in June and where he also became governor. Even in the aftermath of the victory at Oswestry, the committee wrote in July that "For twelve months they have been fed only with fair promises" – a direct attack on Denbigh's management of the campaign. Tempers flared and Denbigh directly confronted Mackworth at the Coventry committee, which had also written a letter critical of him to the House of Commons. Mackworth had accused Denbigh of panic in the face of a charge by a much weaker enemy force. Denbigh threatened to run him through with his sword or have him cudgelled to death. He asserted that he would never again come to Shropshire until Mackworth and other hostile members were removed from the committee. Mackworth was subject to implicit criticism from Parliament: on 11 September the Committee of Both Kingdoms resolved to tell him that he should prioritise his work in Shropshire over his responsibilities at Coventry and on 17th despatched a letter to this effect via Pierrepont. However complaints from many quarters against Denbigh were mounting and the issues were referred to Parliament. Although the House of Lords cleared him on 8 November, the Commons came to a split decision on 20 November. It found that he had violated an agreement made with the Coventry Committee and "The Question being put, Whether this House doth concur with the Lords, in sending down the Earl of Denbigh to his Command in his Association: It passed with the Negative." However, Denbigh was allowed to serve on a parliamentary delegation for peace talks with the royalists. The issues between Mackworth and Denbigh were to be rehearsed again in 1649 as Parliament moved to put the king on trial. Denbigh's arrogance toward several of the West Midlands committees was recounted in detail and his threats to have Mackworth murdered said to have been made to William Crowne, Mackworth's brother-in-law. Mackworth had by then amassed a considerable amount of evidence that Denbigh and his associates had considered the creation of a "third party" during 1643–4 and this seems to have helped discredit his opposition to the trial and execution of the king.

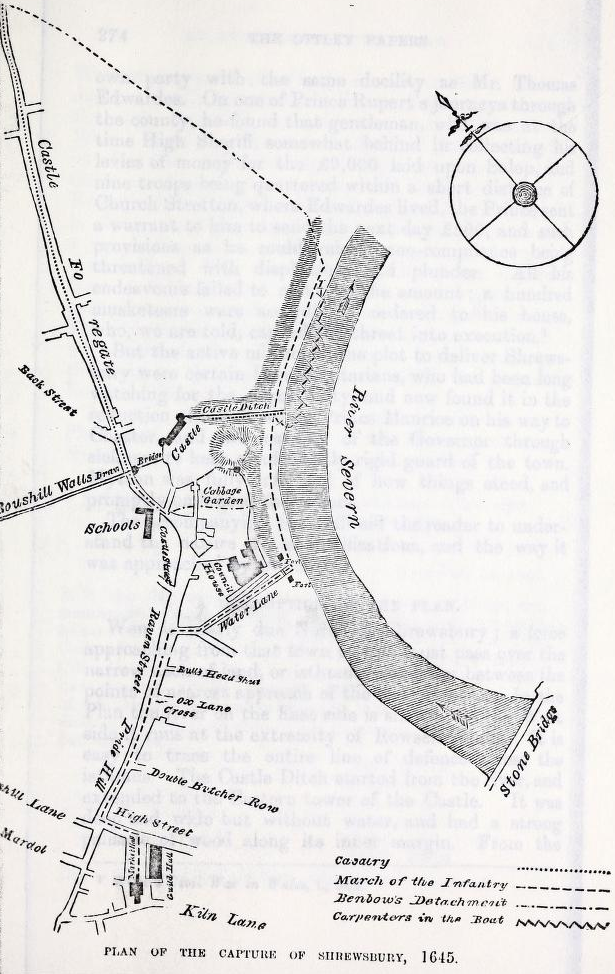
Plan of the capture of Shrewsbury by parliamentarian forces, 21 February 1645. The route used by Reinking's force is marked as "Benbow's Detachment."

Mytton was apparently seen by the committee as sharing Denbigh's brusqueness and arrogance. In January 1645 committee members Robert Clive, Andrew Lloyd, Thomas Hunt and Robert Charlton wrote to William Brereton to solicit help for their plan to retake Shrewsbury. They said that Mytton "carries himself crossly towards us on all matters," and proposed not to inform him of the plan, but to pretend they were making an attempt on the nearby village of Atcham – a plausible target, as it commanded important bridges where Watling Street crossed the River Severn and River Tern. In the event, Mytton was in charge of one of the cavalry units that occupied the town on 21 February. However, the crucial first entry to the town was made by a tiny shock force under William Reinking, a Dutch professional soldier employed by the Wem committee, which was admitted into the town by a sympathiser. Mytton seems to have expected the governorship of the town. However, on 27 February, immediately after news of the town's capture arrived in London, the Commons voted £4000 for Shrewsbury's defence and resolved:

That it be referred to the Committee at Shrewesbury, or the major Part of them, to nominate a Governor for the Town of Shrewesbury; and to present it to the House: And that, in the mean time, the Committee take care of the Preservation of the Town.

On 26 March the committee replied that "Wee have upon serious consideration made choyce of Colonell Humfrey Mackworth." Mytton pointedly was the only committee member not to endorse the decision. On 19 March it was rumoured that Mytton had been appointed governor and ten days later he was received at the bar of the House of Commons and warmly thanked for his efforts. However, when the committee formed an infantry force of 150 on 2 April it was significantly named "Humphrey Mackworth his regiment." Mytton accepted the command of parliamentarian forces in North Wales, temporarily leaving the scene. Mackwood's appointment was not immediately confirmed by Parliament and initially he had no official rank beyond committee member. On 2 June he was reinstated to the town's council, along with the other suspended members. He was appointed Recorder of the town in November, a judicial post in the gift of the council that went some way to recognising his power. Only much later, on 2 June 1646, did the Commons formally appoint Mackworth governor, with the House of Lords agreeing three days later. He had been present with John Birch at the siege of Ludlow, the last royalist garrison in Shropshire, and the appointment was a direct response to their report of the town's fall. On 6 June the Derby House Committee agreed to grant Mackworth a commission to be governor of the castle and garrison, simultaneously appointing Samuel More governor at Ludlow. Thereafter Mackworth was appointed to every parliamentary committee in Shropshire, strengthening his influence across the county.

=== Puritan revolution ===
The conquest of power by Mackworth and the committee allowed them to carry out a thorough purge, reversing the expulsions of puritan clergy of the late 1630s and of 1642. The incumbents at Holy Cross (the parish church on the site of Shrewsbury Abbey, St Mary's and St Chad's, and the head of Shrewsbury school, were all expelled and replaced by reliable puritans. Julines Herring, who had previously been public preacher in the town, was invited to return from his exile in Amsterdam but was already dying. The purge was extended into the rural areas, with Studley being expelled from his living at Pontesbury. St Chad's elected its own minister: Thomas Paget, a committed Presbyterian who had submitted a book defending this form of church government to Parliament in 1641. He probably played a leading role in drawing up plans for the Presbyterian organisation of the Church of England in Shropshire and Mackworth must have at least approved them, as he was by far the strongest voice in the government of the county, as well as a leading member of Paget's congregation.

In June 1646, in fulfilment of the Solemn League and Covenant that had secured its alliance with the Scottish Covenanters, Parliament required each county to plan and secure approval for a Presbyterian polity. Only eight counties both drew up a plan and tried to implement it, Shropshire being one of them. The structure is summarised in a document dated 29 April 1647 and entitled: The Severall Divisions and Person for Classicall Presbyteries in the County of Salop. Shrewsbury formed the centre of its first classis and Mackworth was named as one of its ruling elders. As the title "Saint" was now restricted to the Apostles, St Chad's was now referred to as Chad's (although rendered Cedds), and St Mary's and St Alkmund's also lost their titles: village churches were referred to simply by the name of the parish, not the dedication. Other committee members were distributed as elders throughout the other classes, with Robert Corbet and Andrew Lloyd, as well as Thomas Mytton in the second. It seems that much of the structure was a dead letter and that only the fourth classis, based on Wem and Whitchurch functioned fully. A substantial proportion of the classis ministers signed a protest against toleration of Independency or Congregationalism in 1648. However, the Scottish Covenanters' invasion of England in an attempt to restore the king discredited Presbyterianism in the eyes of the New Model Army which began to gain the upper hand politically, favouring Independency and the execution of the king. Mackworth increasingly supported this radical tendency. Owen and Blakeway assumed he had always been an Independent, but the Presbyterian blueprint for the county, revealed in Auden's much later sketch for an ecclesiastical history of the county, suggests an evolution.

== Defending Shrewsbury ==
From 1647 Mackworth's power was consolidated in Shropshire and expanded in Wales and the Welsh marches to become regional in scope. His governorship was recognised again by Parliament on 24 March 1647, specifying Shrewsbury Castle as its seat. The difficulties of governing were similar to those experienced not only by other parliamentarian governors, like Colonel Hutchinson at Nottingham but also by Ottley and the other royalist governors of Shrewsbury. Financial pressures were enormous and continuous. In June Mackworth was nominated by the Commons as one of the commissioners to raise the vast and strangely precise sum of £5531 19s. 9¾d. monthly from Shropshire to finance Fairfax's army and military operations in Ireland. There were the problems of dealing with the royalist gentry who had been defeated, as well as with continued royalist activity. There were also significant divisions in the parliamentarian ranks. All of these problems had to confronted while retaining a fair measure of support from the population of the town and the county.

=== A posture of defence ===
Mackworth began to tighten up security in the summer of 1647. The impetus came not from royalist threats but from the uncertainty caused by the abduction of the king from parliamentary custody at Holdenby House by George Joyce on 3 June. The uncertainty caused Mackworth to write urgently to members of the county committee on 5 June:

Gentlemen,
I heare, how true I know not, that the King, with the commissioners at Holmby, are fetcht away by a 1000 horse to the army. What thinges may come to, God onely knowes. Wherfore, I propose to you whether it may stand with your likeinge, 1st, That I speedily put this towne into a posture, and have a maine guard in the towne at least every night, if not some in the day: which, if you assent, I shall doe speedily. 2. That all the troope bee sent to Ludlow forthwith, to convey the ordinaunce and magazin away with as much speede as may bee hither : and some of the troope to lodge constantly in the Castle here, at least till all artillery and magazin bee brought away. 3. That all the armes in all places of the county bee speedily seised, and brought hither and kept, to bee delivered to the owners when the danger cease; and that none in the county be permitted to sell armes or powder without an order from the Committee. 4. That all the delinquents that have not compounded bee presently seized. To these, or what else you thinke needfull, I desire your subscriptions and this letter returned. What you advise I shall see immediately executed...

However, there were already rumours that the ruling group moved more slowly than the situation demanded because they secretly favoured the army. The discontinuation of the plans for classical presbyteries during the year suggests the same: the functioning fourth classis was dominated by Sir John Corbet, who was part of the moderate Presbyterian group in Parliament. A row within parliamentarian ranks in January 1648 brought Mackworth's true feelings to the surface. An ensign called Hill had made an accusation of disloyalty against Mackworth's second-in-command, John Downs. Although Mackworth investigated and dismissed the matter, Hill went further and got a commission from Fairfax to restart the investigation. Mackworth sent the commission back to Fairfax, making clear that Downs was a trusted aide whom he had used to "beget a right understanding amongst my officers and soldiers concerning your excellency's and the army's proceedings." As they were mainly preoccupied with internal politics, the Shrewsbury parliamentarians seem to have done little to reinforce the defences until well into 1648, when a credible royalist threat emerged.

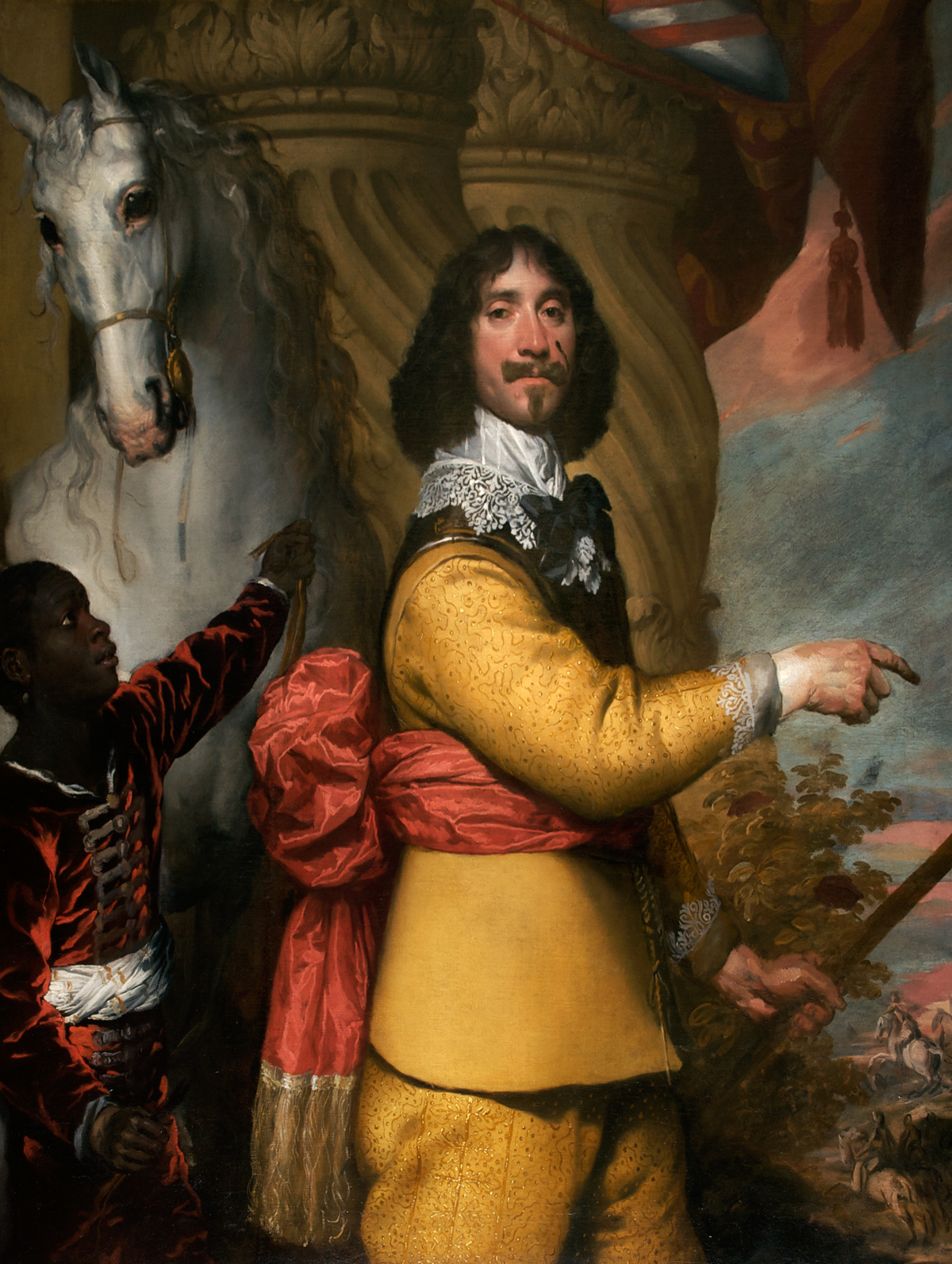
Portrait of Lord Byron by William Dobson, 1643, Lord Byron, the king's agent in the Welsh Marches during the renewed of civil war in 1648.

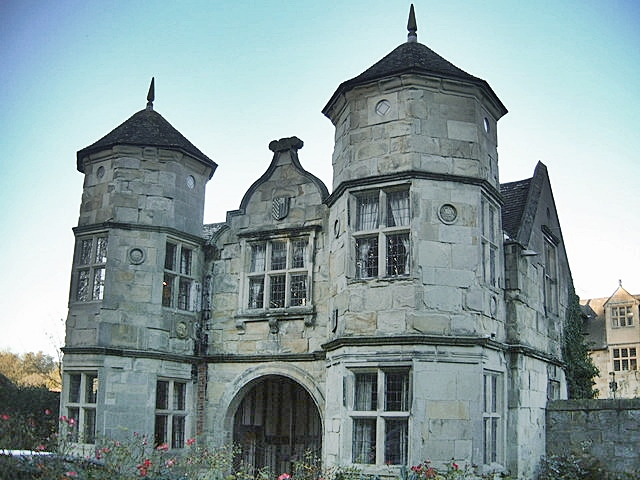
Gatehouse to Madeley Court, one of the probable targets of the June rebellion.

Shropshire became involved in the Second English Civil War largely because, in February 1648, John Byron, 1st Baron Byron, the former royalist regional commander and governor of Chester, was sent from Paris to foment royalist uprisings. This resulted in royalist plot to seize Shrewsbury, which Mackworth detected and frustrated in April: those arrested were imprisoned in Ludlow Castle. Attempts to start a general uprising in Wales in May were confused and easily suppressed. However, a wide-ranging plot involving royalist gentry in Herefordshire, Worcestershire and Shropshire that was uncovered and suppressed in early June caused consternation. About 200 royalists were surprised at Boscobel and their leaders, including Dud Dudley arrested. The plan had involved seizing a house known as Dawley Castle and the nearby house of Sir Basil Brooke, presumably Madeley Court. It was the Worcester committee that took credit by reporting this to the Commons on 11 July and the Shropshire parliamentarians were instructed to demolish Dawley Castle. An attempt to seize Chester Castle on 16 June came to nothing. The Shropshire committee had formed a safety committee and this at last acted on Mackworth's urgings of the previous year, ordering on 25 June that "the towne of Shrewsbury bee forthwith put into a posture of defence," that additional forces be raised and the walls speedily repaired. However, Robert Clive, an opinionated member of the committee, wrote in July to Speaker Lenthall complaining about the lack of action. The Derby House Committee wrote to the Shropshire committee on 17 July that it should "keep a careful eye on that Castle, that it not be surprised by Malignants."

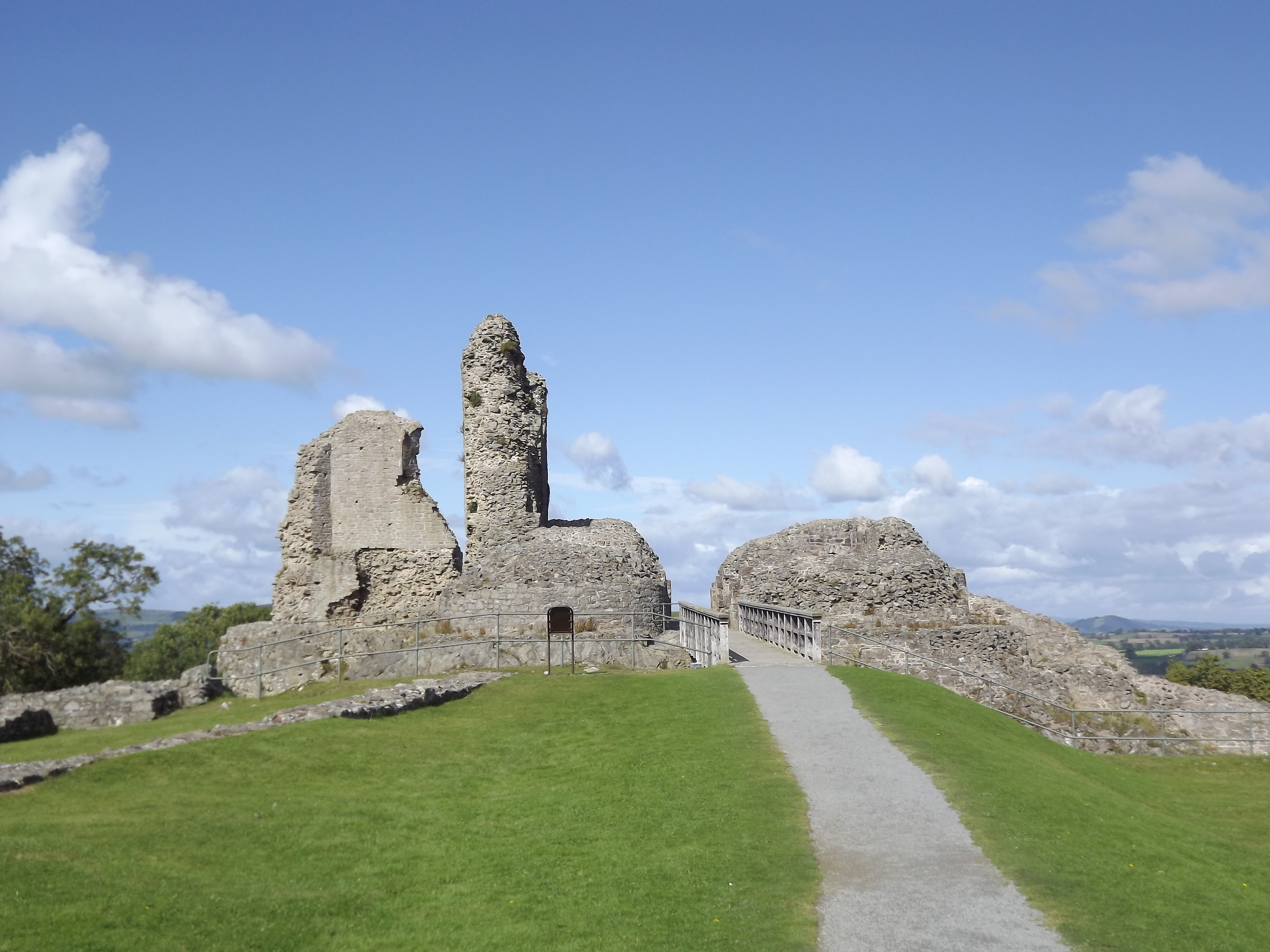
Ruins of Montgomery Castle, which Mackworth secured for Parliament. It was later slighted to prevent its reuse.

On 2 August there was a further attempted uprising in Shropshire, allegedly led by Byron himself. Mackworth learnt through an informer that several troops of royalist cavalry would meet at various locations across the north of the county, close to the Welsh border, including Wattlesborough, before proceeding to a general rendezvous at Prees Heath. The aim was to storm Shrewsbury itself: no infantry or artillery are mentioned, so the scheme must have involved a desperate dash, hoping to catch the garrison completely unprepared. Mackworth used the advantages of good intelligence and short, secure supply lines to the full, quietly concentrating forces at Wem. They moved towards Prees Heath under cover of darkness and surprised several parties of royalists before the full assembly could take place, causing the rest to disperse in panic. Mackworth reported to this on 5 August to William Pierrepont, a member of the Derby House Committee, which oversaw the war effort, requesting extra funds to reinforce Shrewsbury's defences. He wanted 250 more men for the garrison, so that he could have rotating daily shifts on guard overnight. He also needed £200 to repair and resupply the castle itself. The events seem to have made a great impression. Derby House gave Mackworth exactly what he asked and on 8 August the House of Lords approved the grants and received and recorded the report and the accompanying letter from Mackworth. Meanwhile, the Committee entrusted Mackworth with the task of securing Montgomery Castle, imperilled by the impending death of Edward Herbert, 1st Baron Herbert of Cherbury (although the Committee thought he was already dead): Samuel More was appointed governor and the castle secured. On 24 August the Shropshire committee were able to release a large quantity of arms and ammunition to the mayor and corporation to equip a citizen guard for the town. e

=== Division and disaster ===
Although, this was the last significant royalist attempt in Shropshire, although the county's royalists continued to support outbreaks in Wales in Herefordshire. The scale and scope of the year's warfare beyond Shropshire will have become clear as large numbers of Scottish prisoners, mainly captured after the defeat of James Hamilton, 1st Duke of Hamilton by Oliver Cromwell at the Battle of Preston, were kept in the county on their way to enslavement. The events of the summer seem to have stiffened Mackworth's support for the radicals in the army. His response to Pride's Purge of parliament was entirely positive and a letter from Mackworth and his officers to Fairfax was read on 26 December in the House of Commons, asking that "his Excellency would endeavour that justice may done upon the Authors of our troubles and bloodshed in the three Kingdoms in some exemplary way." This was the day that the Rump Parliament ordered its committee on bringing the king to justice to prepare ordinances for his trial. The execution of the king was followed by considerable royalist agitation but no rising in Shropshire. However, there was a serious incident of internal dissent in August, when a cavalry troop heading for Ireland were attacked by a mob led by Robert Clive, disarmed and robbed of their horse – a protest against continuing militarisation.

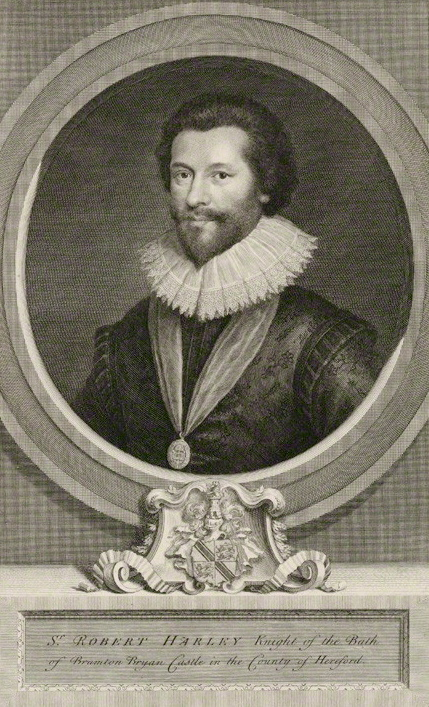
Sir Robert Harley, a distant relative of Mackworth, who was refused permission to settle in Shrewsbury.

In 1650 the Oath of Engagement, which partly contradicted the Solemn League and Covenant, divided puritan ranks. Paget, Mackworth's minister at Chad's, preached in favour, but many of the other ministers were opposed. In May disagreements over the Engagement forced Mackworth to reject a request from a distant relative, Sir Robert Harley to take up residence in Shrewsbury: Harley a moderate Presbyterian and parliamentarian from Herefordshire, settled instead at Ludlow, just inside Shropshire. Mackworth's correspondence with Sir Robert was vetted by the English Council of State. The issue was overlaid by an outbreak of bubonic plague, which spread rapidly from its first appearance at Frankwell in June. Mackworth quarantined affected soldiers and the administration was conducted from Atcham. The quarter sessions brought in a local levy for relief of the infected and the poor. Mackworth was ordered to eject the Presbyterian ministers who refused the Engagement in August, including Samuel Fisher at Mary's and Thomas Blake of Alkmund's, although both were active in pastoral care during the plague. The Council of State wrote on 10 August expressing security concerns, as it feared the garrison might be depleted. Mackworth was told to close the schools in the town and to evacuate any infected houses close to the castle or gates. By November the plague was dying way, although it continued to kill until January 1651. The poor were worst affected and about half the victims died in the pest houses, to which the sick were taken. The total numbers are unknown but Chad's parish alone buried 251 plague victims between June 1650 and January 1651.

The end of the plague allowed vacant posts to be filled. Richard Heath was appointed to Alkmund's on 23 June. He was recommended for the post by Mackworth and by his teacher and patron, John Milton, and he went on to help in the preparation of the London Polyglot Bible, partly financed by the Commonwealth. The threat of military operations in the vicinity and other problems delayed an appointment at Mary's and Francis Tallents did not take up the post formally until early 1653.

=== Royalist remnants ===
Mackworth headed the county sequestration committee, which confiscated and leased out the estates of royalist landowners, pending their reaching a settlement with the Committee for Compounding with Delinquents, based at Goldsmiths' Hall. Mackworth's dealings with the Ottley family are fairly well known from their point of view, as their correspondence is preserved. The county committee began felling Francis Ottley's trees in retribution for his burning of houses while governor or Sheriff. This was quickly forbidden by the Committee for Compounding but it seems that Mackworth and the county committee were slow to comply. In April 1647, a letter from Lucy Ottley, the wife of Sir Francis, to Richard Ottley, their eldest son, mentioned moves by Mackworth and others to prosecute Sir Francis, but the details are unknown and nothing seems to have come of it. Mackworth's name heads the signatories on the document releasing Ottley's lands from sequestration in March 1648, although the financial details were far from settled. Ottley was accused of involvement in the attempted royalist uprising of that summer but apparently never apprehended. There were legal proceedings between Mackworth and Ottley in February 1649, but their nature is not known, although there was apparently difficulty in securing legal officials not related to either party. Sir Francis completed his business with the compounding Committee in the summer and died later in the year.

== The crisis of 1651 ==
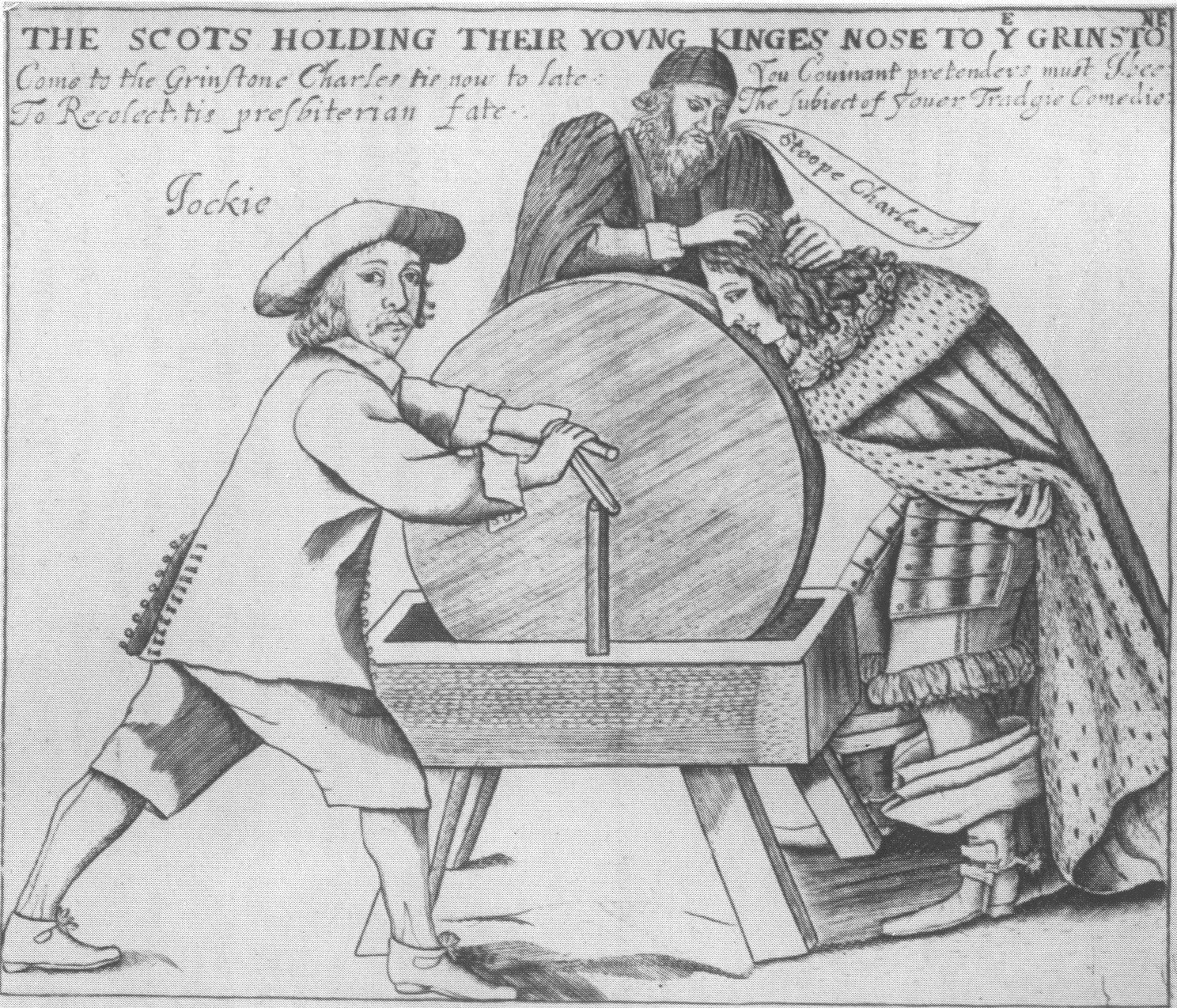
English satirical view of Charles Stuart's relationship to his Scottish supporters.

Charles Stuart, the eldest son of Charles I, was crowned at Scone, Scotland on 1 January 1651. On 15 March the Council of State wrote to Mackworth at Welshpool, warning of the possibility of regional risings in Wales, possibly supported by royalist forces from the Isle of Man. As the English parliamentarian army was drawn into fighting the Covenanters in eastern Scotland, tensions rose and early in August, and the Council wrote to Robert Duckenfield, Mackworth and Thomas Birch, ordering them to recruit a thousand new soldiers from the militia companies: part to free experienced troops from garrison duty and the other part to march with the veterans to Scotland.

Charles was able to slip over the border with a large army on 6 August, heading south as quickly as possible. Thomas Harrison sent urgent messages to Mackworth and the governors of other towns, including Stafford and Chester, to warn them that the Scottish army might pass their way. Thomas Mackworth, Humphrey eldest son, was one of the officers with the garrison and it was reported the town was in "good posture" on 16 August. Approaching through Cheshire, Charles and his largely Scottish army camped at Tong Norton on 20 August. There were a few defectors, including John Benbowe, a hero of the capture of the town in 1645.

Charles the wrote to Mackworth requesting him to surrender the town and the castle:

I cannot but persuade my self you will do it, when I consider you a gentleman of an ancient house, and of very different principles, as I am informed, from those with whom your employment ranks you at present.

Mackworth's reply took no notice of Charles's claim to kingship but was addressed: "For the Commander-in-Chief of the Scottish Army." He flatly rejected all attempts to win him over and declared:

I resolve to be found unremoveable the faithful servant of The Commonwealth of England: and if you believe me to be a gentleman, you may believe I will be faithful to my trust. What principles I am judged to be of, I know not: but I hope they are such as shall ever declare me honest; and no way differing from those engaged in the same employment with me, — unless they should desert that cause they are imbarqued in.

On 27 August both letters were read in the House of Commons, which voted to send Mackworth a medal attached to a gold chain valued at £100, "as a Mark of the Parliament's Favour, and good Acceptance of his Fidelity." The business was duly passed on to Alderman Francis Allen, a regicide and goldsmith. As before when in favour, Mackworth seems to have used the opportunity to extract more money for his hard-pressed garrison: the Council of State assured him it would honour a £100 bill for contingent expenses. Mackworth was quick to spend the money and it was ordered paid on 19 September. The Scots had moved on and were soundly defeated on 3 September by Oliver Cromwell at the Battle of Worcester.

== Legal and judicial appointments ==
In September 1647 Mackworth added the recordership of Wenlock to that of Shrewsbury and, at some stage, he also became recorder of Bridgnorth, although this is not attested before December 1653, when he was ordered to consider a petition concerning compensation for the burning of the town more than seven years earlier. In March 1648 he was appointed Attorney General for North Wales, alongside his Gray's Inn colleague Thomas Fell. In June Mackworth was granted a commission of oyer and terminer to sit with Peter Warburton and Robert Duckenfield to try conspirators arrested by William Brereton in connection with a royalist plot to seize Chester Castle.

In the same year he became Vice Chamberlain of the Palatine County of Chester. This involved preparing cases to be decided by the Chamberlain, who headed the county's judiciary and administration, as well as deputising for him on the numerous occasions he was absent. A manuscript thought to date from around the time of Mackworth's birth seeks to define the preconditions for the success of the distinct local judicial system of Cheshire:

Fyrste that there bee a good Vice Chamberlaine appointed to governe the Courte well and to please and content the Countrey, who must bee no comon Lawyer, such being men more fitt to bee imploied in Courtes of Learninge then in cases of Conscience, for yf those shall bee corrupted with affection (as all men of flesh and bloud may bee) they have a farre greater scope to do amysse than other men, inclyninge sometimes on the one side with the Lawe...It will be good therefore in this Office, to appointe an honest reasonable gentleman to be Vice Chamberlayne, such a one as feareth God, regardeth the honor of him under whom hee serveth, and respecteth his own credytte.''

Mackworth seems to have done his best to "please and content the country" promising to exercise circumspection in issuing writs relating to the City of Chester, where there were jurisdictional conflicts dating back at least a century. In 1649 Mackworth was appointed deputy chief justice of the Chester circuit. On 20 July 1649 he was consequently removed from his post as attorney general, as was Fell, who was moved to join him at the Chester circuit, taking the post of Puisne Justice of Chester: fittingly they were called to the bench of their Inn together in the following year.

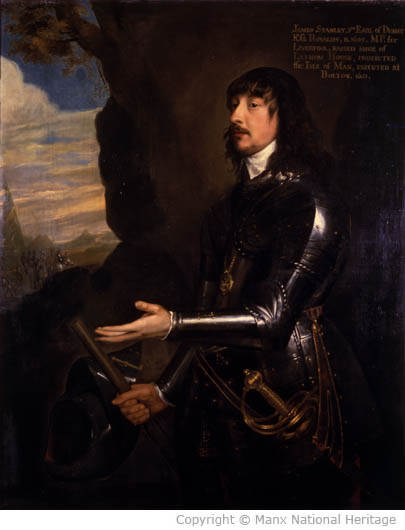
The Earl of Derby, executed after Mackworth presided over his trial.

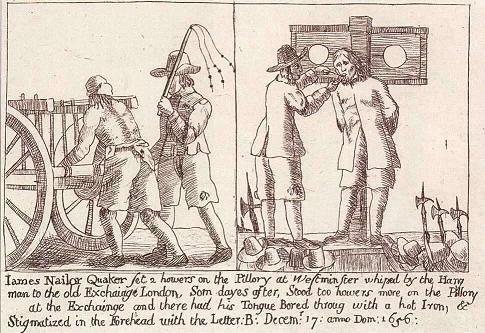
James Nayler, a Quaker leader, being pilloried and whipped, in stark contrast to Harrison's treatment by Mackworth and Fell.

Mackworth was active in trials resulting from the royalist uprisings and invasion of 1651. By May there were numbers of suspects in custody at Chester and Liverpool and the Council of State recruited Mackworth to help with investigations. In June he was seconded as a commissioner, along with Mytton and others, to the court dealing with a rebellion in Cardiganshire. A week after the Battle of Worcester, the Council of State resolved that James Stanley, 7th Earl of Derby, and a number of other key figures in the invasion and the supporting rebellions should face a show trial before a "council of war" in Chester, specifying Mackworth first and foremost to take part in the reckoning. The trials were held under a specific act of 12 August, prohibiting communication with Charles Stuart. Among the others tried before Mackworth in October were Sir Timothy Fetherstonhaugh, and John Benbow. Derby had led the incursion from the Isle of Man and Fetherstonhaugh had joined the ensuing Lancashire rebellion, defeated at the Battle of Wigan Lane. Although he was acting as judge, not prosecutor, the Council briefed Mackworth on how best to present witnesses and evidence against the defendants, as well as supplying him with its own papers to be introduced into the proceedings as he saw fit. They were subsequently found guilty and beheaded. The defector Benbow was discovered hiding in Shrewsbury and was named as one of the "fit persons to be brought to trial, and made examples of justice," grouped with Derby and Fetherstonhaugh as a prime example. The Council of State singled him out in a letter to Mackworth as requiring to be tried "speedily and effectually." After his trial he was returned to Shrewsbury and executed by firing squad in a cabbage patch, from which he had taken part in the storming of the town six years previously. All the executions took place on 15 October: Benbow was buried in Chad's churchyard the following day.

At the assizes of April 1652 Mackworth and Fell presided over the case of a Quaker or Ranter named Harrison, who had proclaimed a radically interior interpretation of Christianity, denying the reality of the afterlife. Presumably considering the matter insufficiently serious for their court, they remitted it to the magistrates, who expressed distaste for Harrison's views but resolved to "hear no more of the business." It was after this that Fell returned home to Swarthmoor Hall to find his wife had opened the house to a Quaker community.

Mackworth appears to have retained his interest in the humbler levels of law and justice even after his preferments. Extant orders of the Shropshire quarter sessions, which begin at Michaelmas 1652, show him attending as a justice of the peace. He appeared at the head of the list of justices (which was not always recorded), for Epiphany, Trinity and Michaelmas 1653, and Epiphany 1654, so it is likely he attended regularly when available. The magistrates were mainly members of the county committee and included on occasions Thomas Mytton.

== National prominence ==
For just under a year, before his untimely death, Mackworth was at the centre of national affairs in the newly created Protectorate

=== Protector's Council ===
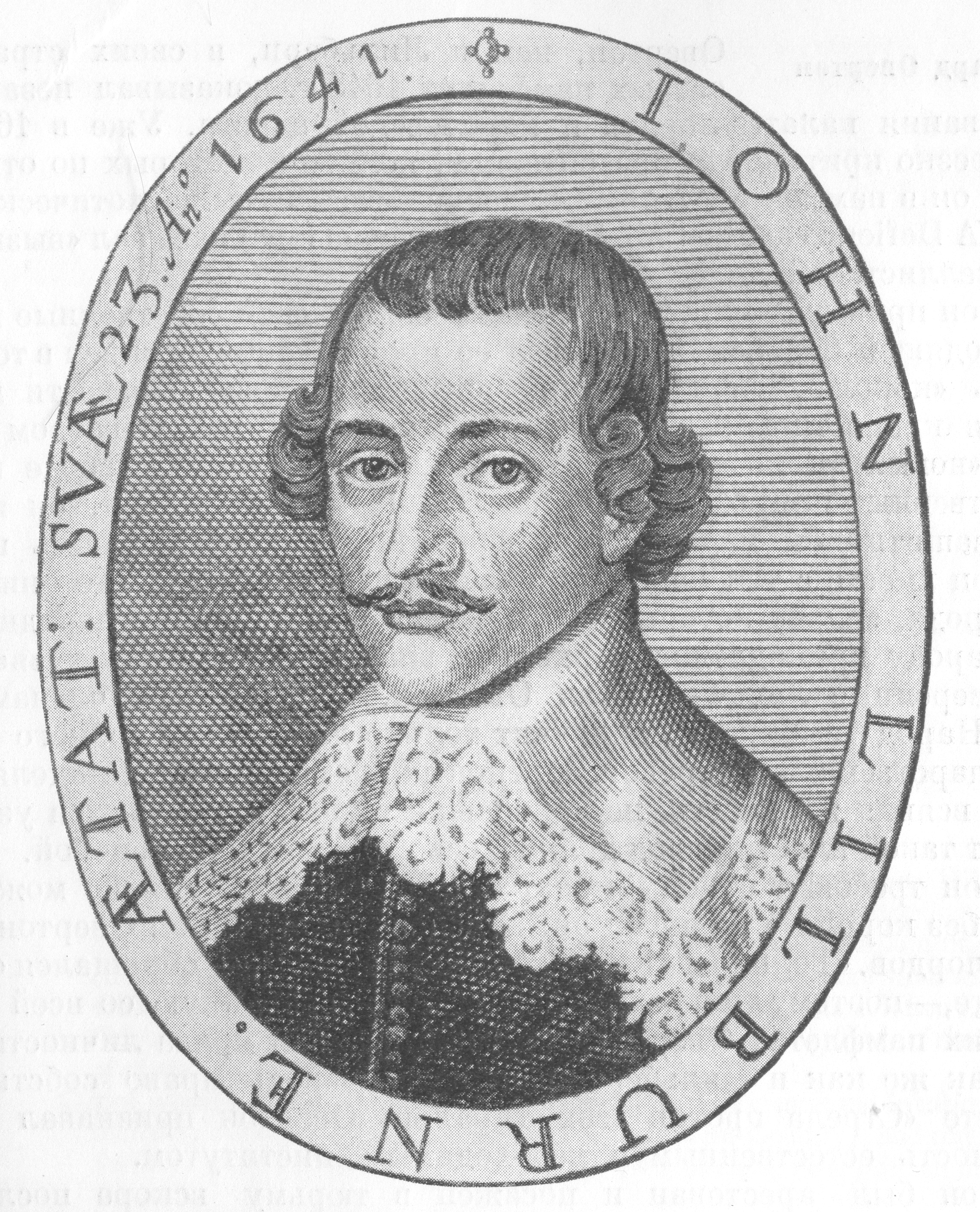
John Lilburne. Mackworth was one of the committee that recommended his internment on Jersey.

Oliver Cromwell in 1656 by Samuel Cooper.

The Protector's Council nominated Mackworth as a new member to Oliver Cromwell, the Lord Protector, on 2 February 1654 and he swore the oath and took his seat for the first time five days later. He was immediately given legal work as part of a committee on a testamentary issue. As early as 9 February he was deputed with three other members to prepare a report on the complex financial legacy of Sir Peter Temple, 2nd Baronet, whose widow Christian née Leveson, had Shropshire connections. The following day he was appointed to a committee with plenary powers to investigate and propose improvements to the entire system of government finance. On 21 February it was a committee to investigate speedily ways of improving debt proceedings for traders in the City of London. This set the tone for his involvement, which was active and regular, employing both his legal and his political skills. However, the range of duties was very wide and sometimes tedious: in March alone Mackworth was put on a rota to dine with ambassadors from the Dutch Republic and from France. As he now needed to spend most of his time in London, he was given a government mews house, previously inhabited by John Hewson. It was a busy year, with the Council meeting most days. Mackworth attended 159 meetings out of a possible 176.

In a number of cases, Mackworth was closely involved in moves to move aside opponents of the régime, who came from diverse standpoints and were treated in often very different ways. On 8 March he was one of a committee of three deputed to examine the case of the Levellers' leader John Lilburne, detained by the government the previous year, although acquitted of all charges. Eight days later they recommended he be sent to Mount Orgueil Castle on Jersey. On 23 March he was put on a committee to investigate the dispute between Elizabeth, Countess Dirletoun, and a group of improvers concerned in the construction of the River Wey Navigation, headed by James Pitson. Lady Elizabeth was the widow of William Hamilton, 2nd Duke of Hamilton, who was killed at the Battle of Worcester. She had refused the compensation offered by the developers for building on her land and had been breaking down the banks of the river, finally demolishing a building that had been in use as a government powder magazine, claiming that she feared for the lives of her family. As the scheme had been approved by Parliament and was clearly in the interests of trade, there was little chance that objectors would prevail, but the committee's recommendations were moderate. Pitson was granted an order protecting his investment and requesting the county authorities take more care to keep the peace. However, as Lady Dirlestoun would not accept £200, he was to pay her £10 10s. a year and then buy the land off her heirs. More generally, Mackworth was deputed to a number of committees dealing with censorship.

In relation to perceived social evils of the day, Mackworth reported on the Protector's response to draft legislation to end cockfighting and was appointed to the committee preparing legislation to suppress duelling: apparently a direct response to a brawl between John James, a Worcestershire veteran of the Civil War, and the irascible Charles Rich. Sometimes he was deputed to deal with regional matters in which he had specialist knowledge, as when a law had to be passed allowing Sir George Warburton, the High Sheriff of Cheshire, to move his court to Nantwich because of a plague outbreak in Chester.

=== The First Protectorate Parliament ===
In 1654, Mackworth was one of the four elected members of parliament for Shropshire in the First Protectorate Parliament: a single chamber parliament, established under the Instrument of Government, with a £200 property qualification. His fellow MPs were Philip Young, his son-in-law, Mytton and Robert Corbet. His son, the younger Humphrey Mackworth, was returned as an MP for Shrewsbury and his brother-in-law, William Crowne was MP for Bridgnorth. Parliament assembled on 3 September. The majority of the members elected were Presbyterian in inclination and many were there primarily to dismantle the new political dispensation, which was prohibited by Clause 12 of the Instrument of Government itself.

On Monday 5 September, the first day of business, Mackworth was appointed to the important Committee of Privileges, which dealt with the freedoms and obligations of members and was given just three weeks to consider objections to any returns. Other committees tended to reflect his established interests. On 15 September he was appointed to a committee to examine the proceedings of the judges at Salters' Hall: the very great powers of the livery company, which was able to regulate many aspects of the daily life as well as the work of its members, seem to have become controversial and Mackworth had considerable experience in dealing with City institutions. Three days later he was added to a deputation to take to the Protector a resolution declaring a fast day: for puritans a period devoted to public prayer and repentance rather than of specific dietary restriction. On 22 September he was appointed to a committee on "abuses in printing", charged not only with investigating the boom in dissident publication but also with preventing meanwhile the publication of books and journals as it saw fit. On 25 September he was appointed to two committees in a single sitting. The first was to consider a bill prescribing a Recognition of Government: an oath recognising the Protectorate, using the words of Clause 12 of the Instrument, that had been accepted in principle a week earlier. The second was to on a bill for the dismissal of inadequate clergy and schoolmasters. The ordinance itself appointed him a commissioner for Shropshire, Cheshire and the counties of North Wales. An ordinance of September nominatedMackworth a Visitor of the University of Oxford. Further committees were on Scotland, the Court of Chancery, a petition from William Killigrew (1606–1695) over problems developing the Lincolnshire Fens, and another from Lord Craven an immensely wealthy royalist who was seeking the return of his property.

During November the parliament began to discuss plans to reduce the size of the army and the strength of garrisons. However, Cromwell listed Shrewsbury as one of those requiring further consideration, probably influenced by Mackworth's evaluation of its strategic importance. The parliament was to prove entirely fruitless, dismissed on 22 January 1655, with no legislation enacted, and with a final harangue from an exasperated Protector. However, Mackworth was dead and buried by this time.

== Death ==
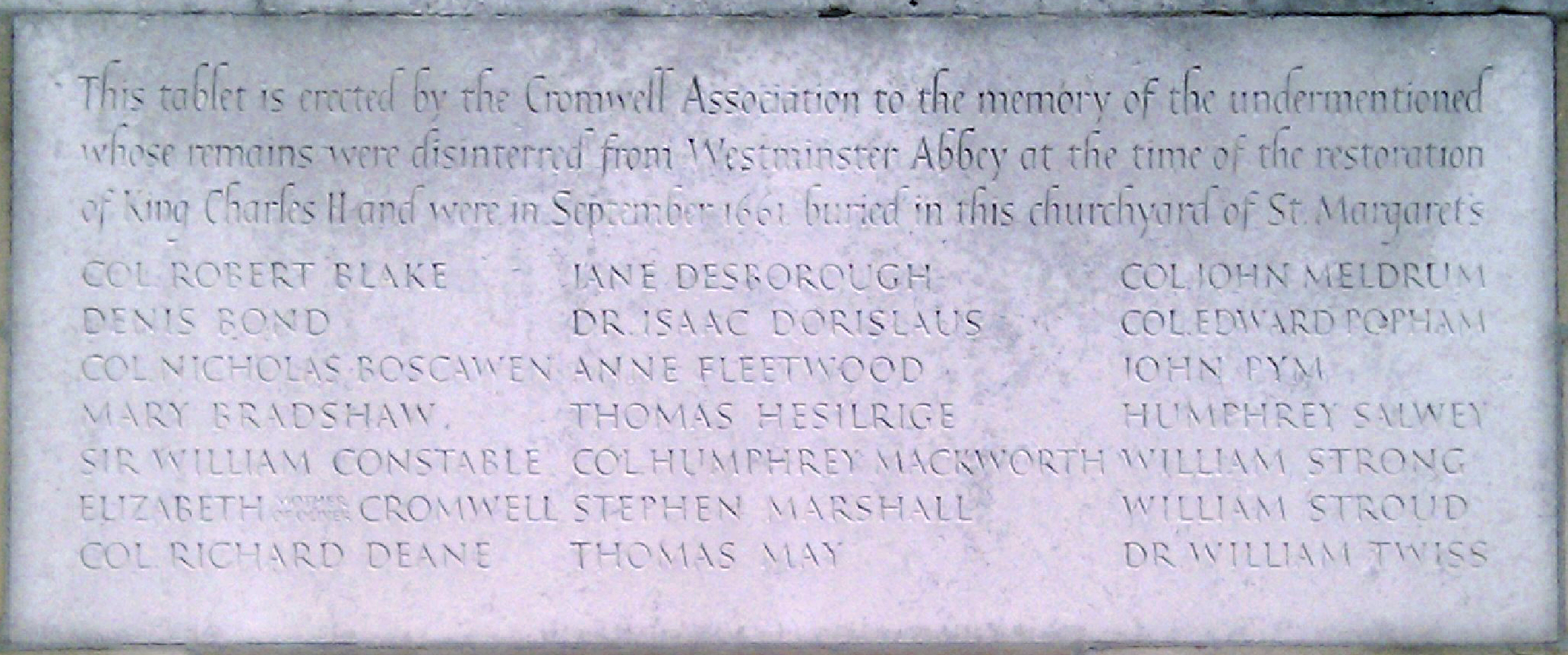
Memorial to the exhumed and reburied Parliamentarians at St Margaret's, Westminster.

Mackworth died in London some time in December 1654, perhaps suddenly, as he died intestate. However, he last attended Council on 5 December, missing meetings on the 12th, 16th and 19th of the month, which makes a short illness possible. The last mention of him in action has him presenting to the council the papers of "Emanuel Martyns Dorindo, alias David Abrabanell, a Hebrew," about a year before the tacit acceptance of the resettlement of Jews in England. He was given a state funeral in the Henry VII Chapel in Westminster Abbey, as 'Colonel,' at night on 26 December.

Mackworth's widow, Mary, was in some difficulty because of his intestacy. On 14 March 1655 her mews home was assigned to Major-General Philip Skippon, pending her vacating the premises. Edmund King, who acted as an assistant to Mackworth in his work for the State, also seems to have suffered financially and was given £30 by the Council in June 1655, with the recommendation that Cromwell find him a suitable post, possibly in the customs service. Johnstone says Mrs Mackworth was allowed £300 for funeral expenses, and Coulton follows, stating that "his burial was paid for by the state at a cost of £300." The State Papers seem to show that only in March 1657 did the Protector's Council did give his widow £300 towards the funeral costs. Moreover, this was not a grant but part of Mackworth's pay arrears, which appear to have been considerable, as a further £300 was paid to his son and executor at the same time, using Walter Strickland as intermediary. In May 1658 Mackworth's daughter Anne petitioned the council:

My father served in civil and military offices all through the wars to his death, and died 3 years ago intestate, without providing for me, on which you have several times promised to settle something on me. I implore you to order your good intentions to be executed.

This was sent for favourable consideration to the Privy Council, again via Strickland, and a committee set up to consult with the younger Humphrey Mackworth on what to offer. In December of the same year, three months after Oliver Cromwell's death, a pension of £160 was at last settled on Mrs Mackworth.

After the Restoration (1660) Mackworth was regarded as attainted and as a regicide, although he was never named in an act of attainder and was not one of the judges at the trial of Charles I. His body was disinterred in September 1661, with other servants of the Commonwealth buried in Westminster Abbey, and buried in an unmarked pit in the churchyard of St Margaret's, Westminster.

== Marriages and family ==
The Mackworth pedigree, including Humphrey's family, was explored by John Brickdale Blakeway in an article covering Betton Strange, published in 1889 but written about 80 years earlier. Humphrey Mackworth married twice and both marriages produced children.

Anne Waller was Mackworth's first wife. They were married on 30 January 1622 in St. Andrew Holborn Church, London. She was the daughter of Thomas Waller of Beaconsfield, and distantly related to the poet Edmund Waller, who was also born in Beaconsfield. She was buried at St Chad's on 26 May 1636. Her children were:

- Thomas Mackworth (1627–96), Humphrey's heir, who married first Anne Bulkeley and then Sarah Mytton, daughter of Thomas Mytton. His children included:

- Bulkeley Mackworth, an important Shropshire landowner.
- Sir Humphrey Mackworth, industrialist in Wales, Tory MP, fraudster and constitutional writer.

- William Mackworth, baptised 10 September 1629, buried 2 May 1631.
- Humphrey Mackworth, baptised 31 May 1631. He succeeded his father as governor of Shrewsbury and held the post until at least 1659.
- Anne, baptised 20 September 1632, who married Sir Thomas Mackworth, 3rd Baronet, of Normanton, Rutland, a distant relative.
- Elizabeth, baptised 7 August 1634, died 23 July 1636.
- Dorothy, who married Thomas Baldwin of Diddlebury, recorder of Shrewsbury.

Mary Venables was Humphrey Mackworth's second wife. She was the daughter of Thomas Venables of Kinderton in Cheshire. She long outlived Mackworth, dying in 1679. Her children were:

- Peter, baptised 3 October 1639, buried 28 October 1648.
- Mary (1641–71)

== Footnotes ==
Parliament of England
Preceded by William Bottrell; Thomas Baker	Member of Parliament for Shropshire; 1654; With: Thomas Mytton; Robert Corbet; Philip Young	Succeeded by Thomas Mackworth; Samuel More; Andrew Lloyd; Philip Young
