= Thomas Jones (English judge) =

English judge and politician

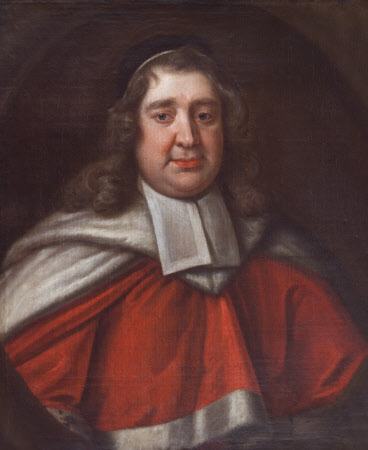
Sir Thomas Jones

Sir Thomas Jones KS (13 October 1614 – 31 May 1692) was an English judge and politician who sat in the House of Commons from 1660 to 1676.

Jones was the second son of Edward Jones and his wife Mary Powell, daughter of Robert Powell of Whittington Park. He was educated at Shrewsbury School before being admitted to Emmanuel College, Cambridge, as a pensioner on 9 May 1629. On 6 May of the same year he became a student of Lincoln's Inn, and was called to the bar on 17 March 1634, two years after finishing his Bachelor of Arts degree. His career began in Shrewsbury, where he was elected Alderman in 1638.

During the English Civil War Shrewsbury was a Royalist garrison and Prince Rupert stayed at Jones's house. Jones was taken prisoner when the town was captured by the Parliamentarians in February 1645, the commissioners for corporations later stated that "he had declared himself against the commission of array" and "refused to find a dragoon for the King’s service".

In 1660, Jones was elected Member of Parliament for Shrewsbury in the 1660 Convention parliament, together with his cousin Samuel. The day following the election he became town clerk for Shrewsbury and served until 1662. Also in 1660, he was made a Bencher at Lincoln's Inn. He was re-elected MP for Shrewsbury in 1661 for the Cavalier Parliament. During this time he was inactive in Westminster, and instead furthered his legal career in Wales and the Marches. Between 1662 and 1670 he served on Eyre circuits of Northern Wales, and in 1669 he was made a Serjeant-at-law. In 1671 he was made Chief Justice of the North Wales circuit. The same year he was promoted to King's Serjeant and knighted on 26 October.

On 13 April 1676, Jones was rewarded for his service in Parliament by being made a justice of the King's Bench. In 1678, as one of the Popish plot judges, he drove hard for the conviction of Edward Coleman, but later clearly indicated his belief in Samuel Pepys' innocence. In 1680, the House of Commons attempted to have him impeached, but the start of the second Exclusion Parliament prevented this. In 1681 and 1683 he helped try the conspirators in the Popish Plot, and appears to have initially believed Titus Oates and other informers before changing his mind.

Jones was the judge in the 1683 Quo warranto trial against the Corporation of London, and was rewarded on 29 September 1683 by succeeding Francis Pemberton as Chief Justice of the Common Pleas. He was one of the judges appointed to the Court of Claims prior to the coronation of James II in 1684. Although he continued to display severity when handing out judgements in subsequent trials, he eventually found himself unable to follow the King's wishes, and along with three other judges was dismissed on 21 April 1686; he was appointed due to his severity and then removed, ironically, because he was not severe enough. He returned home to Carreghofa, Montgomeryshire, where he died on 31 May 1692 aged 77.

Jones married Jane Bavand, daughter of Daniel Bavand of Chester, around 1640, and they had five sons and six daughters. His son, Edward Jones became a Canon of Windsor.

Parliament of Great Britain
Preceded by William Jones; Humphrey Mackworth	Member of Parliament for Shrewsbury; 1660–1677; With: Samuel Jones 1660; Robert Leighton 1661	Succeeded by Sir Richard Corbet; Robert Leighton
Legal offices
Preceded by Sir Francis Pemberton	Chief Justice of the Common Pleas; 1683–1686	Succeeded by Henry Bedingfield
