= Francis Pemberton =

English judge

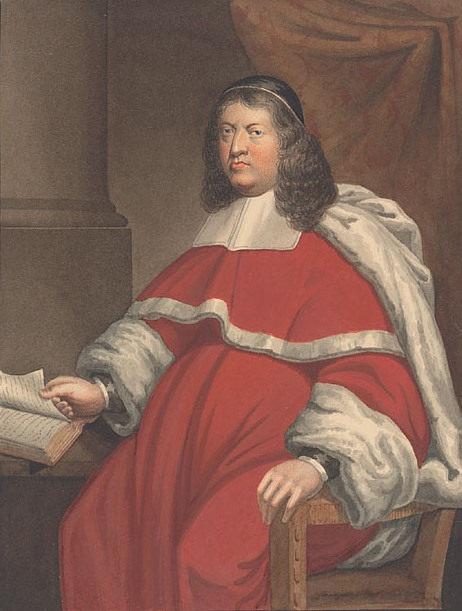
Sir Francis Pemberton

Sir Francis Pemberton (18 July 1624 – 10 June 1697) was an English judge and briefly Lord Chief Justice of the King's Bench in the course of a turbulent career. He was imprisoned three times at various points in his career, and as a judge is considered to have shown strong bias for or against defendants in some of the important trials of political figures he presided over.

== Early life ==
He was born on 18 July 1624 at St Albans, the son and heir of a former London merchant, Ralph Pemberton, mayor of St. Albans, in 1627 and 1638, by his wife, Frances, daughter of Francis Kempe. His grandfather was Roger Pemberton of St Albans, Hertfordshire. Francis was educated at St Albans School and Emmanuel College, Cambridge. As a young man, he fell into dissolute company and acquired extravagant habits, leading to his imprisonment in the Fleet for debt.

On 14 October 1645, he was admitted a member of the Inner Temple. There, he applied himself diligently to the study of the law and, having eventually secured his release, he was called to the Bar on 27 November 1654.

== Family ==
In 1667, Pemberton married Anne Whichcote, the daughter of Jeremy Whichcote, Warden of Fleet Prison. They had numerous children, as his memorial in Highgate chapel records.

== Early career ==
Pemberton rapidly acquired a substantial practice and was regularly retained by the Government in important criminal cases. In 1675 he was called to the degree of Sergeant-at-law and was thereafter regarded as the foremost advocate of his day.

Appearing at the bar of the House of Lords to argue an appeal to which some members of the House of Commons were respondents, Pemberton inadvertently triggered a constitutional struggle for supremacy between the two Houses of Parliament. The House of Commons had resolved that it would be a breach of their privileges for any lawyer to act in the appeal and ordered that he should be taken into custody. The House of Lords thereupon ordered his release. The resulting tug-of-war ended only when King Charles II intervened and Pemberton was set free.

== Judicial career ==
On 30 April 1679 Pemberton was appointed a puisne judge. Having offended the Government by his conduct in relation to the Popish Plot, he was dismissed within two years, whereupon he returned to his practice at the bar. However, he rapidly returned to favour and was appointed Lord Chief Justice of the King's Bench on 11 April 1681.

In the same year, he presided over the trumped-up trial of Oliver Plunkett, the Primate of the Catholic Church in Ireland, who was wrongly convicted of treason and executed. To his further discredit, he also sought unsuccessfully to promote the trial for treason of Lord Shaftesbury. He nevertheless managed to retain among his contemporaries a reputation for independence and integrity and it was because of suspicions of his political loyalties in a forthcoming case concerning the City of London that he was removed from office in 1682. He accepted instead the lesser position of Chief Justice of the Common Pleas.

In the following year he was appointed to head the Commission set up to deal with the Rye House Plot and presided over the trial of Lord Russell. Although Russell was convicted, Pemberton was regarded as having conducted himself with unbefitting moderation during the trial and he was dismissed from all judicial employment on 28 September 1683. John Evelyn wrote in his Diary for 4 October 1683: "He was held to be the most learned of the judges and an honest man".

== Later career ==
Pemberton again returned to the bar and again acquired a substantial practice, acting successfully in the defence of the Seven Bishops. In 1689, he faced a further petition alleging that he had breached the privileges of the House of Commons. On this occasion, the allegation was that, as Lord Chief Justice, he had allowed legal proceedings to be pursued against the Sergeant-at-arms of the House of Commons in respect of his official activities. Pemberton was imprisoned for eight months in Newgate Prison.

After his release, Pemberton's practice substantially diminished and he spent much of his time at his house in The Grove, Highgate, though he was retained in the unsuccessful defence of Sir John Fenwick in 1696. He died on 10 June 1697 and is buried in Highgate Chapel. His first son, Francis Pemberton, FRS (?1675–1762) also became a barrister.

His return to private practice was not at the time considered improper but in more modern times has been cited as an illustration of the need for a judge to abandon practice permanently since, it was said, his reputation as a judge carried far more weight with juries than the merits of his arguments or the opinions of the actual judges hearing the case. In 1929 the Chief Justice of Ireland cited the bad example set by Pemberton, in laying down a rule that judges after their retirement should not seek to return to legal practice.

== Sources ==
- Lord Campbell's Lives of the Chief Justices of England: from the Norman Conquest till the death of Lord Tenterden (London, 1849–1857).

Legal offices
Preceded by Francis North	Chief Justice of the Common Pleas; 1683	Succeeded by Sir Thomas Jones
Preceded by William Scroggs	Lord Chief Justice of the King's Bench; 1681–1683	Succeeded by George Jeffreys, 1st Baron Jeffreys
