= Samuel Jones (English politician) =

English politician

Sir Samuel Jones (c. 1610 – 3 January 1673) was an English politician who sat in the House of Commons in 1656 and 1660. Although a parliamentarian in the English Civil War he later became a strong Royalist.

Jones was the second son of Isaac Jones, Merchant Taylor of Austin Friars, London and Petersham and his wife Elizabeth Prince, daughter of Richard Prince of Abbey Foregate, Shrewsbury. He was educated at Shrewsbury in 1622.

During the Civil War, Jones commanded a parliamentary regiment under Sir William Waller. He was commissioner for defence for Surrey in 1643 and commissioner for assessment for Surrey in 1644. He was J.P. for Surrey from 1644 to 1652. In 1652 he succeeded to property in Shrewsbury on the death of his father and added to it property at Courteenhall, Northamptonshire and other purchases. He was commissioner for assessment for Westminster in 1652 and High Sheriff of Northamptonshire for 1652–53.

In 1656, Jones was elected Member of Parliament for Shrewsbury in the Second Protectorate Parliament. He was commissioner for assessment for Surrey in 1657 and commissioner for militia for Shropshire in 1659. He was commissioner for militia for Shropshire and Northamptonshire in March 1660. In April 1660 he was elected MP for Shrewsbury in the Convention Parliament. He offered a loan to the exiled Court, and 24 May he was one of five Members sent into the city to raise £2,000 for the King who failing to raise the sum agreed to advance the whole amount themselves. in the parliament he showed himself as an ultra-Royalist, taking a hard line against regicides and others who benefitted from the Commonwealth. He was commissioner for assessment for Shropshire and Denbighshire from August 1660 to 1661 and commissioner for assessment for Northamptonshire from August 1660 to 1669. He was knighted on 2 September 1660. From 1661 to his death he was colonel of the militia for Northamptonshire and from 1662 to his death he was JP for Northamptonshire. In 1663 he inherited further property in Shropshire on the death of his brother Sir William Jones of Berwick. He was High Sheriff of Shropshire for 1663–64 and was secretary and auditor to the council in the marches of Wales from 1663 until his death. He was commissioner for assessment for Oxfordshire from 1665 to 1669. He became a Gentleman of the Privy Chamber in 1667. He was High Sheriff of Oxfordshire for 1669–70.

Jones died at the age of 63, and was buried at Courteenhall. He had married twice: firstly by 1647, Margaret Middleton, daughter of Timothy Middleton of Stansted Mountfitchet, Essex and secondly by licence issued on 1 June 1669, Mary Tryon, daughter of Peter Tryon of Bulwick, Northamptonshire. He had no children and bequeathed his estates to his great-nephew Samuel Wake, a younger son of Sir William Wake, 3rd Baronet of Piddington. He left bequests to endow a school at Courteenhall and almshouses on his estate in Shropshire. He also left £500 to provide interest-free loans to young tradesmen in Shrewsbury.

Parliament of England
Preceded by Richard Cheshire; Humphrey Mackworth	Member of Parliament for Shrewsbury; 1656; With: Humphrey Mackworth	Succeeded by William Jones (Recorder); Humphrey Mackworth
