= Bulkeley Mackworth =

English landowner (fl. 1720)

Bulkerley Mackworth (fl. 1720) was a notable landowner from Shropshire. The Mackworth family were a major family in Shropshire in the 17th and 18th centuries. He is best known for ordering works in the Market Drayton area, namely Bulkeley Wing (1720) and Buntingsdale Hall (1721). Documents have revealed that Mackworth may have encountered a dispute with the builder of Buntingsdale, John Prince, and dismissed him and hired Francis Smith to complete the building. In 1719, Mackworth was involved in a case in Chancery, relating to West Coppice, alongside James Lacon. He was later known for his charitable disposition.
