= Betton Strange =

Hamlet in Shropshire, England

Coordinates: 52.679°N 2.726°W

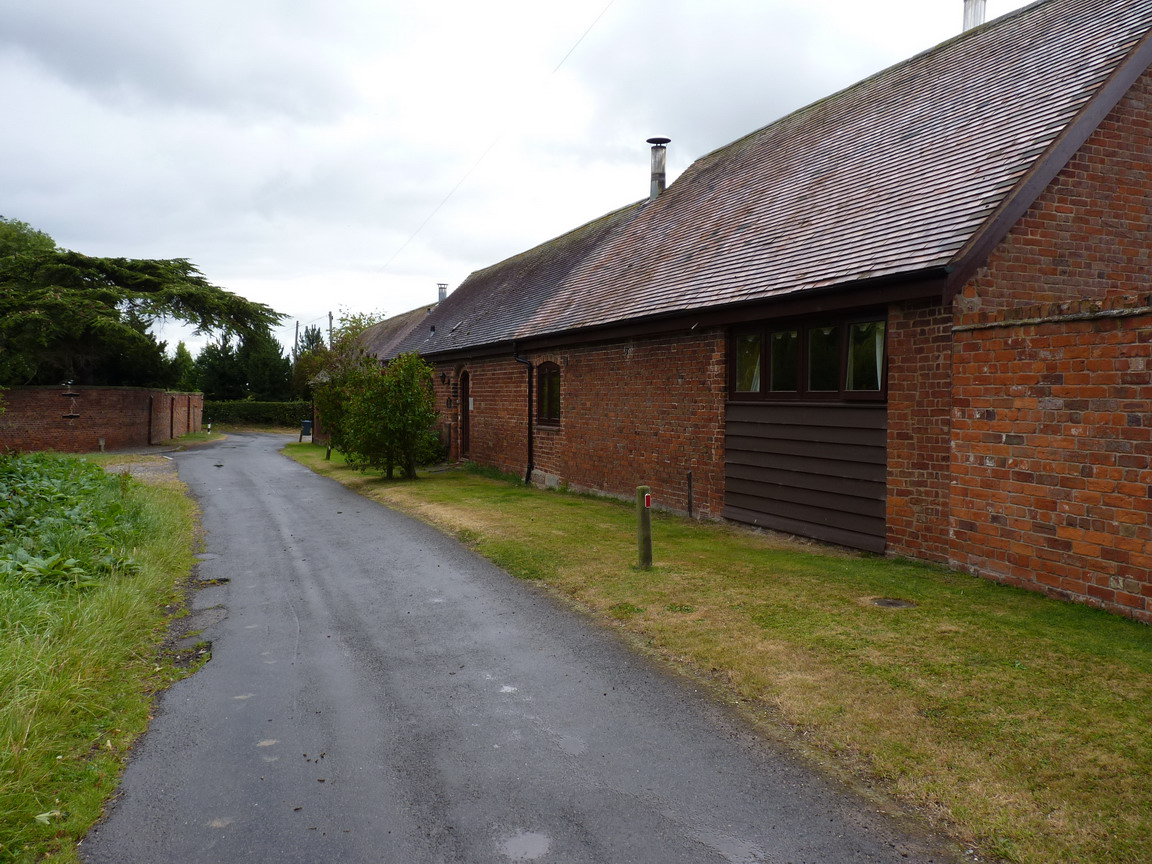
- Long Barn - Betton Grange Farm

- Location within Shropshire
- OS grid reference: SJ509093
- Civil parish: Berrington
- Unitary authority: Shropshire
- Ceremonial county: Shropshire
- Region: West Midlands
- Country: England
- Sovereign state: United Kingdom
- Post town: SHREWSBURY
- Postcode district: SY5
- Dialling code: 01743
- Police: West Mercia
- Fire: Shropshire
- Ambulance: West Midlands
- UK Parliament: Shrewsbury and Atcham

Betton Strange is a hamlet in the English county of Shropshire. It is only 2 miles (3.2 km) south of Shrewsbury town centre, situated in countryside just beyond the Shrewsbury bypass (the A5) and near the A458.

It is located in the civil parish of Berrington, a village 2 miles (3.2 km) to the south. The hamlet lies at an elevation of between 65 metres (213 ft) and 85 metres (279 ft). Further west is the large stone quarry at Sharpstone Hill.

Regional Cycle Route 32/33 runs through, on its way from Shrewsbury to Condover. The Shrewsbury to Bridgnorth railway line once ran to the east of the hamlet, but is now dismantled. The postcode is SY5.

== Hall and chapel ==
Betton Strange Hall is a Grade II Listed building, built in the mid-19th Century, originally a country house but now divided into 20 flats. It was owned by the Pearce family who founded Durston House School in Ealing and was used as a boarding school during the Second World War when some of the pupils of Durston House and Ripley Court School in Surrey were evacuated there.

There is a small church or chapel, dedicated to Saint Margaret, situated in woodland to the north of Betton Strange Hall, built in 1858 and also Grade II Listed. It is built of sandstone and still has gas lighting fitted. It is usually locked these days (the churchwardens are shared with that of Berrington's church) though is used irregularly. Originally part of the parish of St Chad's Church, Shrewsbury, it is today part of the Church of England's Diocese of Hereford, coming within the deanery of Condover.

== Betton Grange ==
Betton Grange is a historic part of the hamlet, dating back to the 16th Century, centred on the Grade II Listed farmhouse. The GWR 6800 Class 6880 Betton Grange steam locomotive is named after this ancient manor.

== Betton Alkmere ==
Just to the west of Betton Strange is Betton Alkmere, a typical pool found in central Shropshire. At Betton Alkmere is a Grade II Listed early-19th Century farmhouse.

== See also ==
- Listed buildings in Berrington, Shropshire
