= William Heron =

William Heron may refer to:

- William Heron (High Sheriff of Northumberland), High Sheriff of Northumberland 1257–1258
- William Heron (MP) for Northumberland (UK Parliament constituency) in 1371
- William Heron (died 1428), in 1428 attacked Etal Castle
- William Heron, in 1821, owner of Dalmore House and Estate
- William Thomas Heron (1897–1988), American psychologist
