= John Bertram (died 1450) =

English politician (died 1450)

Sir John Bertram (died 24 April 1450) was an English politician. He sat as MP for Northumberland in May 1413, 1422, 1429, and 1432.

He was knighted by 21 May 1415.

== Political career ==
He also served as escheator of Northumberland from 29 November 1410 till 10 December 1411, 14 December 1415 till 8 December 1416; commissioner of gaol delivery in Northamptonshire and Northumberland c. 1410 till 1411, May 1421, and c. 1431 till 1432; commissioner to victual the garrison at Roxburgh in July 1416; commissioner of array in Northumberland in April 1418, March 1419, March 1425, in Cumberland in March 1427, in Northumberland in October 1429, and July 1434; commissioner to raise royal loans in July 1426, and May 1428; commissioner of inquiry in Northamptonshire c. 1431 till 1432 concerning concealments, in Cumberland, Northumberland, Westmorland, and Yorkshire in July 1434 concerning evasions and concealments; commissioner to hold a special assize in Northamptonshire c. 1431 till 1432; commissioner of oyer and terminer in Northumberland in May 1438 generally.

He also served as sheriff of Northumberland from 10 December 1411 till 3 November 1412, 30 November 1416 till 10 November 1417, 22 September 1422 till 13 November 1423, 5 November 1430 till 26 November 1431, 3 November 1434 till 7 November 1435, 3 November 1438 till 5 November 1439; keeper of Roxburgh Castle from 9 December 1415 till 23 March 1421; justice of the peace for Northumberland from 27 January 1418 till July 1423, 20 July 1424 till July 1437, 1 March 1439 till July 1442; of the Bishop of Durham's liberty of Northamptonshire and Islandshire on 6 September 1421, from c. 1431 till 1432, and c. 1436 till 1437.

He also served as deputy captain of Fronsac in France by 25 August 1419; envoy to Scotland on diplomatic missions on 12 July 1429, 14 August 1433, 3 February till 4 March 1434, 10 May 1434, 5 February 1436, 14 March 1436, 4 March 1437, 20 April 1437, 18 March till 2 April 1438, and 17 May 1438; assessor of a subsidy in Northumberland in January 1436; and Constable of the Castle at Newcastle-upon-Tyne by his death.

== Family ==
He was the second son of Sir Robert Ogle (1353 – 31 October 1409) by his wife Joan (c. 1358 – 12 October 1416), the third daughter and co-heiress of Sir Alan Heton (died March 1388) of Ingram. He was the brother of Sir Robert Ogle. By October 1404, he was married to Isabel, the daughter of Sir William Heron of Cornhill and they had at least two sons, including William Bertram and one daughter. By June 1425, he was married to Joan (died after January 1451), the daughter of Sir John Loudham and widow of Sir John Swillington (died 2 April 1418) of Burston, Norfolk, and Wigston, Leicestershire.
