= Sir Ralph Delaval, 1st Baronet =

English landowner and politician (1622–1691)

Sir Ralph Delaval, 1st Baronet (13 October 1622 – 29 August 1691) of Seaton Delaval, Northumberland was an English landowner and politician who sat in the House of Commons at various times between 1659 and 1685.

== Biography ==
Delaval was the son of Robert Delaval of Seaton Delaval and Barbara, daughter and co-heiress of Sir George Selby, 1st Baronet. Delaval matriculated at Queen's College, Oxford on 15 June 1638, aged 15, and was admitted to Lincoln's Inn in 1639. He was a supporter of Parliament during the English Civil War. In 1644 he was appointed a deputy lieutenant for Northumberland and he served as commissioner for the county militia in 1648. He was High Sheriff of Northumberland in 1649. In 1652, he was appointed a justice of the peace for the county.

In 1659, Delaval was elected Member of Parliament for Northumberland in the Third Protectorate Parliament. By this stage, however, Delaval was a Royalist conspirator, chiefly valued for his influence over Charles Howard. He was re-elected MP for Northumberland in 1660 in the Convention Parliament following the Stuart Restoration. Delaval secured a pardon for his activities during the Interregnum, and he was created a baronet "of Seaton, in the County of Northumberland" in the Baronetage of England on 29 June 1660. In 1663, he was accused of encouraging the Derwentdale Plot – an alleged conspiracy by radical Puritans and ex-Parliamentary soldiers to rebel against Charles II – but he was not charged with any offence. Delaval conformed to the Church of England after the passing of the Conventicle Act 1664.

In 1677 he was elected MP for Northumberland again in the Cavalier Parliament and was re-elected for the two parliaments of 1679 and 1681. He defeated a challenge from the court-backed candidate, Ralph Widdrington, in the March 1679 English general election. During the Exclusion Crisis, he was marked by Shaftesbury as an opponent of exclusion. In the years that followed, he supported Sir John Fenwick, 3rd Baronet in his local quarrels with Widdrington, and was replaced in Northumberland in 1685 by Widdrington's henchman, William Ogle. In 1686, the Privy Council ordered that Delaval be removed from the local commission of the peace, but he remained a deputy lieutenant.

Delaval developed the family's commercial interests at Seaton Delaval by building a harbour and sluice gates at nearby Hartley Pans, which came to be known as Seaton Sluice.

Delaval was succeeded in the baronetcy first by his eldest son Ralph and later by a younger son John.

Parliament of England
Preceded by Rump Parliament	Member of Parliament for Northumberland; 1660–1661; With: Sir William Fenwick	Succeeded by Sir William Fenwick; Viscount Mansfield
Preceded by Sir William Fenwick; Viscount Mansfield	Member of Parliament for Northumberland; 1677–1685; With: Sir John Fenwick	Succeeded by Sir John Fenwick; William Ogle
Baronetage of England
Preceded by (new creation)	Baronet (of Seaton); 1660–1691	Succeeded by Ralph Delaval
