= 1326 =

1326 in various calendars
- Gregorian calendar: 1326; MCCCXXVI
- Ab urbe condita: 2079
- Armenian calendar: 775; ԹՎ ՉՀԵ
- Assyrian calendar: 6076
- Balinese saka calendar: 1247–1248
- Bengali calendar: 732–733
- Berber calendar: 2276
- English Regnal year: 19 Edw. 2 – 20 Edw. 2
- Buddhist calendar: 1870
- Burmese calendar: 688
- Byzantine calendar: 6834–6835
- Chinese calendar: 乙丑年 (Wood Ox); 4023 or 3816 — to — 丙寅年 (Fire Tiger); 4024 or 3817
- Coptic calendar: 1042–1043
- Discordian calendar: 2492
- Ethiopian calendar: 1318–1319
- Hebrew calendar: 5086–5087
- Hindu calendars
- Vikram Samvat: 1382–1383
- Shaka Samvat: 1247–1248
- Kali Yuga: 4426–4427
- Holocene calendar: 11326
- Igbo calendar: 326–327
- Iranian calendar: 704–705
- Islamic calendar: 726–727
- Japanese calendar: Shōchū 3 / Karyaku 1 (嘉暦元年)
- Javanese calendar: 1237–1238
- Julian calendar: 1326; MCCCXXVI
- Korean calendar: 3659
- Minguo calendar: 586 before ROC 民前586年
- Nanakshahi calendar: −142
- Thai solar calendar: 1868–1869
- Tibetan calendar: ཤིང་མོ་གླང་ལོ་ (female Wood-Ox); 1452 or 1071 or 299 — to — མེ་ཕོ་སྟག་ལོ་ (male Fire-Tiger); 1453 or 1072 or 300

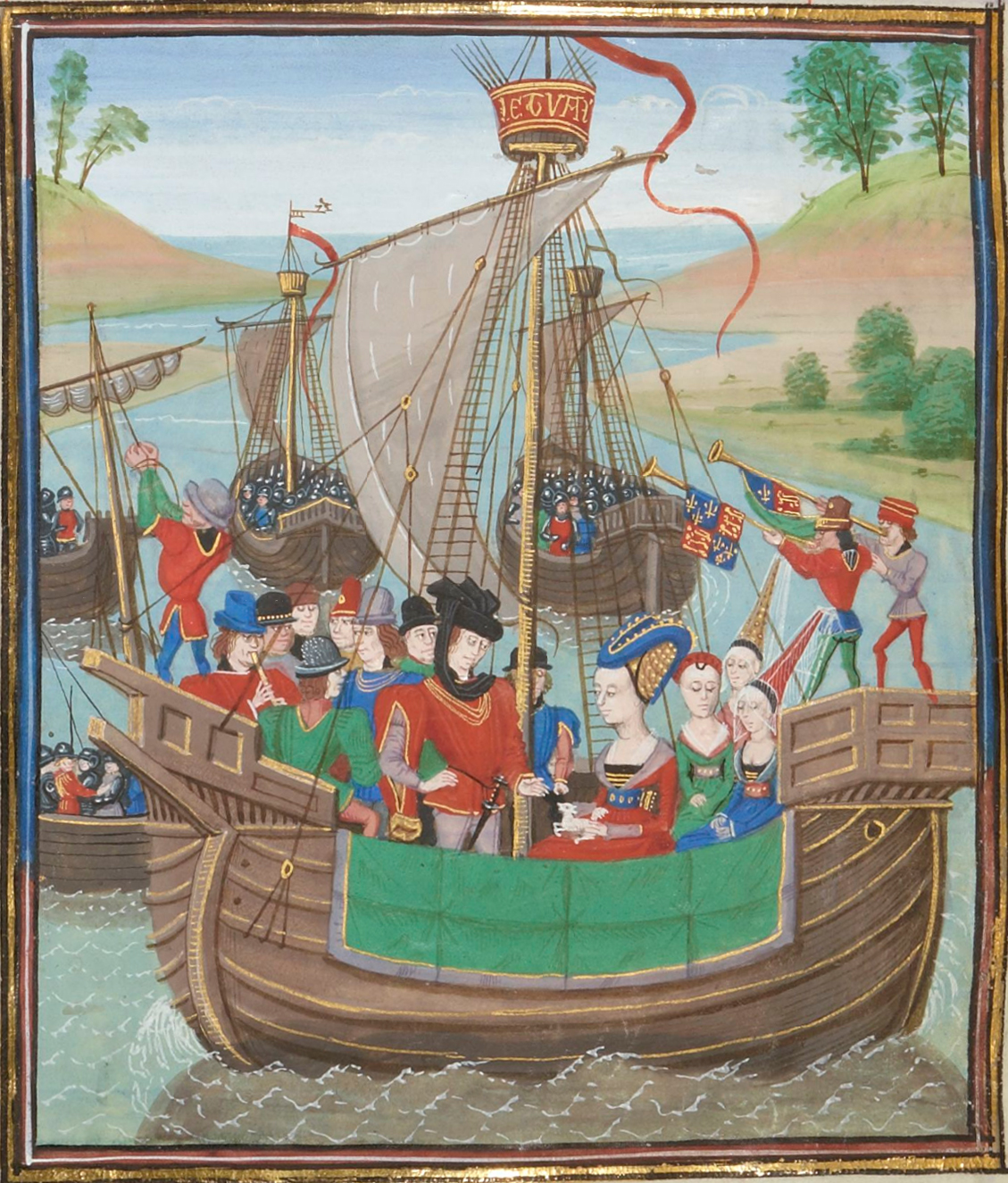
Isabella of France (middle) departs with her fleet and Roger Mortimer to England

Year 1326 (MCCCXXVI) was a common year starting on Wednesday of the Julian calendar.

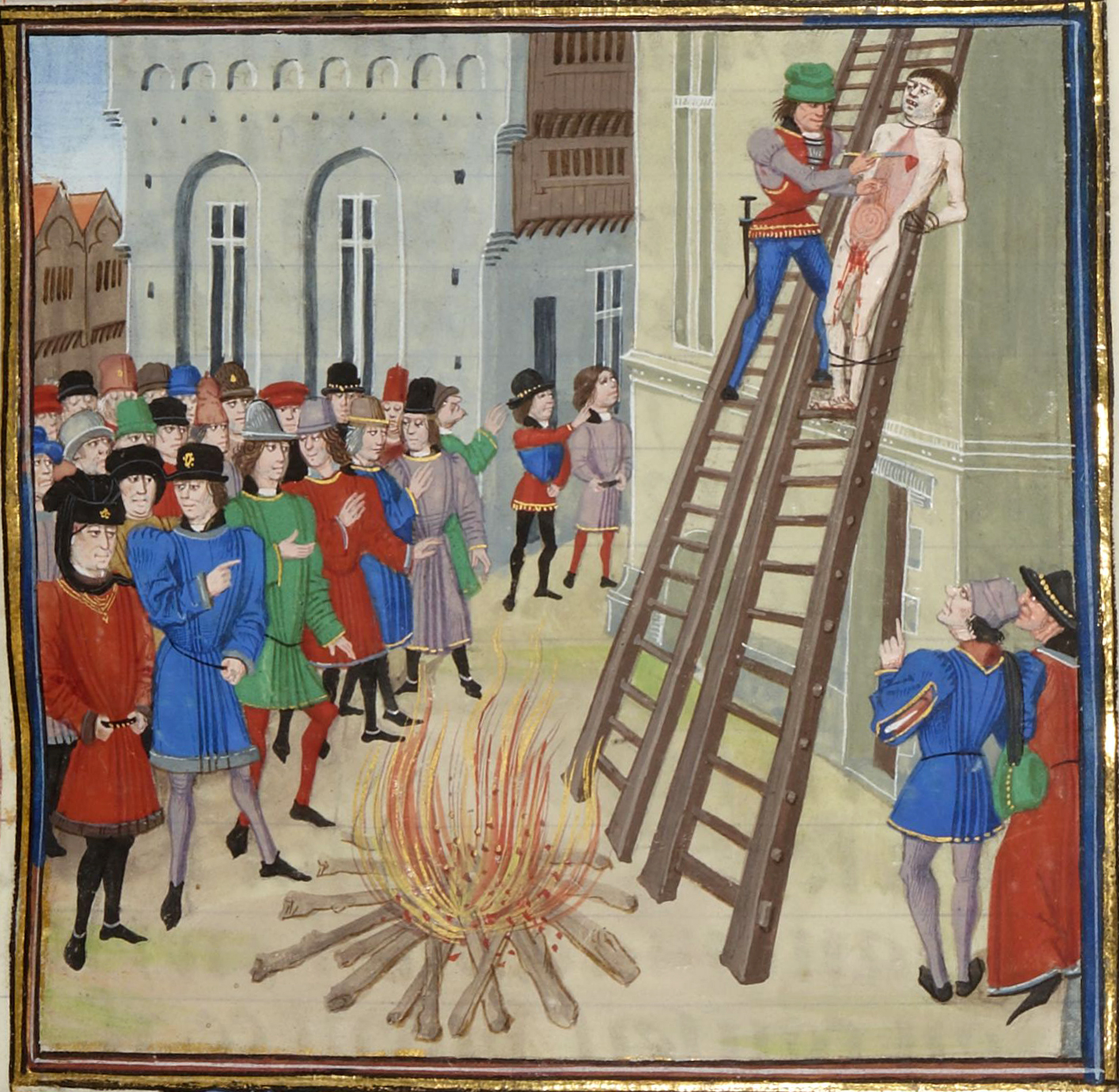
Hugh Despenser the Younger is Hanged, drawn and quartered.

== Events ==
=== January – March ===
- January 21 – The foundation of Oriel College (as King's College), the University of Oxford's fifth oldest (still surviving) college, is confirmed by royal charter.
- February 10 – The Raid on Brandenburg begins as Polish-Lithuanian forces led by Władysław I Łokietek, "the elbow-high", King of Poland, and of the Grand Duchy of Lithuania under Gediminas, raid the territories of the Margraviate of Brandenburg (within the Holy Roman Empire), with the sanction of Pope John XXII. Władysław regards the Neumark (East Brandenburg) as Polish territory.
- February 14 – Queen Ingeborg, the regent and de facto ruler of Sweden, is stripped from all political authority. Due to having many debts (known as the Scania affair), she gives up several fiefs.
- February 20 – The foundation of Clare College (as University Hall), the University of Cambridge's second oldest (still surviving) college, by royal charter.
- February 28 – Frederick the Fair becomes the sole Duke of Austria upon the death of his younger brother, Leopold I of the House of Habsburg.
- March 11 – The Raid on Brandenburg by King Władysław of Poland is completed with the looting and destruction by Lithuanian troops of the cities of Berlin and Frankfurt (Oder) and the area between them, and the capture of 6,000 German prisoners of war.
- March 25 – At Dagnum (a former city in modern-day Albania), a peace treaty is signed between Venetian merchants of Ragusa and King Stefan Dečanski of Serbia.

=== April – June ===
- April 6 – Siege of Bursa: Ottoman forces (some 10,000 men) led by Sultan Orhan I capture the Byzantine city of Bursa. Orhan makes Bursa the first official Ottoman capital.
- April 19 – The Peace of Arques, brokered by King Charles IV of France, ends the Flemish Revolt, but the treaty is not supported by rebel districts in Flanders.
- May 4 – King Christopher II of Denmark, forced to flee during an uprising, promises to give the Danish Principality of Rügen to John III of Werle and Henry II, Lord of Mecklenburg, leading to the First War of the Rügen Succession.
- June 3 – The Treaty of Novgorod, a 10-year armistice, ends decades of border skirmishes between Norway and Novgorod in the far-northern region of Finnmark.
- June 6 – In Denmark, the Reichsrat votes to remove King Christopher II from office and to replace him with 11-year-old Valdemar V, Duke of Schleswig. Valdemar's uncle, Gerhard III, Count of Holstein-Rendsburg, becomes the regent for King Valdemar.

=== July – September ===
- July 14 – Wartislaw IV, Duke of Pomerania, makes an alliance with Gerhard III, Count of Holstein-Rendsburg, who has taken control of Denmark after the overthrow of King Christopher II. Wartislaw becomes ill and dies 18 days later.
- July 15 – The Scottish Parliament meets at Cambuskenneth and votes to restore 10-year-old Robert Stewart, grandson of Robert the Bruce, to the line of succession to the throne of Scotland. Robert is granted lands in Argyll, Roxburghshire and the Lothians, and will eventually become King of Scotland in 1371.
- August 27 – Queen Isabella of France draws up a marriage contract between the 13-year-old Prince Edward of England (the future Edward III) and Philippa of Hainault, guaranteeing that the wedding will take place within two years (which it does).
- September 15 – Dmitry, Grand Prince of Tver, is executed for the murder of Grand Duke Yuri of Moscow at Sarai on orders of Özbeg Khan, ruler of the Golden Horde that controls much of modern-day Asian Russia.

Isabella's campaign (green) and the retreat of Edward II to Wales (brown)

- September 24 – Invasion of England: Isabella of France and her supporters (including Roger Mortimer) land at the River Orwell in Suffolk. Their aim is to remove King Edward II from his throne and place Prince Edward there as the new ruler. Meanwhile, residing at the Tower of London, Edward tries to raise support in the capital, but instead, there is anarchy in London and mobs killing Edward's officials (including his treasurer, Walter de Stapledon).

=== October – December ===
- October 18 – Isabella of France begins the Siege of Bristol, which is defended by Hugh Despenser the Elder.
- October 26 – After eight days, the castle of Bristol is captured by Queen Isabella, and Hugh Despenser the elder is taken captive. With Bristol secured, Isabella moves her base of operations to Hereford, near the Welsh border. There, she orders Henry of Lancaster to locate and arrest Edward II.
- October 27 – The day after his capture at Bristol, Hugh Despenser the Elder, the chief adviser to King Edward II of England, is dressed in his armor and hanged in public. Afterwards, Hugh's body is dismembered, with his head presented to Queen Isabella to show to others among Edward's allies.
- October 27 – Declaring that they are acting in the name of King Edward and giving as the reason that he is away in France, Queen Isabella and Crown Prince Edward issue a writ summoning the English Parliament to assemble on December 14 at Westminster.
- November 16 – King Edward II of England is captured at Neath Abbey in Wales and brought to England, where he is imprisoned at Kenilworth Castle in Warwickshire.
- December 3 – Queen Isabella and Crown Prince Edward, claiming to act on behalf of King Edward II, issue a new writ postponing the opening of the English Parliament from December 14 to January 7. The new parliament will approve the replacement of King Edward II by the Crown Prince as "Keeper of the Realm".

=== By place ===
==== Europe ====
- Summer – German forces led by Henry II, Lord of Mecklenburg occupy the western territories belonging to the Principality of Rügen. The towns of Barth and Grimmen surrender after a short siege.
- Autumn – Gerhard III, Count of Holstein-Rendsburg allies himself with the Danish magnates. In response, the Hanseatic towns of Demmin, Stralsund, Greifswald and Anklam join the alliance.

==== Middle East ====
- Early Spring – Ibn Battuta, Moroccan scholar and explorer, arrives after a journey of over 3,500 km (2,200 miles) at the port of Alexandria, at this time part of the Bahri Mamluk Empire. On July 16 he departs from Cairo on a trip through Palestine on the way to Damascus, where he arrives on August 9.

== Births ==
- February 3 – Robert Clavering, English official and politician (d. 1394)
- March 5 – King Louis I of Hungary and Croatia (d. 1382)
- March 30 – Ivan II of Moscow, Russian Grand Prince (d. 1359)
- May 1 – Rinchinbal Khan (Ningzong), Mongol emperor (d. 1332)
- May 8 – Joan I, queen of France (House of Auvergne) (d. 1360)
- June 29 – Murad I, Turkish ruler of the Ottoman Empire (d. 1389)
- August 16 – Amaury IV de Craon, French nobleman and knight (d. 1373)
- September 5 – Beatrice of Sicily, Sicilian noblewoman (d. 1365)
- September 15 – Yolande of Dampierre, French noblewoman (d. 1395)
- November 1 – Wartislaw V, Duke of Pomerania, German nobleman and co-ruler (d. 1390)
- November 5 – Nawrahta Minye (Anawrahta II of Sagaing), Burmese prince and ruler (d. 1349)
- date unknown
  - As-Salih Ismail, Egyptian nobleman, prince and ruler (d. 1345)
  - Kitabatake Akiyoshi, Japanese nobleman and samurai (d. 1383)
  - Kusunoki Masatsura, Japanese nobleman and samurai (d. 1348)
  - Imagawa Sadayo, Japanese poet and governor (d. 1420)
  - Isaac ben Sheshet, Spanish Talmudic authority (d. 1408)
  - Ivan Asen IV, Bulgarian nobleman and prince (d. 1349)
  - Manuel Kantakouzenos, Byzantine nobleman (d. 1380)
  - Robert of Durazzo, Italian nobleman and knight (d. 1356)
  - Simeon Uroš, Serbian nobleman and pretender (d. 1370)
  - Tang He (Dingchen), Chinese rebel leader (d. 1395)
  - William Wingfield, English official and politician (d. 1398)

== Deaths ==
- January 18 – Robert FitzWalter, English nobleman and knight (b. 1247)
- January 29 – Roger de Beler, English nobleman, justice and politician
- February 28 – Leopold I, Duke of Austria, German nobleman (b. 1290)
- March 26 – Alessandra Giliani, Italian anatomist and scientist (b. 1307)
- April 6 – Pandolfo I Malatesta, Italian nobleman and knight (condottiero)
- May 6 – Bernard of Świdnica, Polish nobleman, knight and ruler (House of Piast)
- May 11 – Mats Kettilmundsson, Swedish knight, statesman and seneschal of the realm (b. c. 1280)
- May 31 – Maurice de Berkeley, English nobleman (b. 1281)
- July 29 – Richard Óg de Burgh, 2nd Earl of Ulster, Irish nobleman (House of Burgh) (b. 1259)
- August 3 – Roger Mortimer, English nobleman, knight and judge (b. 1256)
- September 15
  - Dmitry of Tver, Russian nobleman and Grand Prince (b. 1299)
  - William FitzJohn, Irish prelate, archbishop and Lord Chancellor
- October 9 – Reginald I of Guelders, Dutch nobleman, knight and ruler (b. 1255)
- October 14
  - Richard de Stapledon, English nobleman, knight and judge
  - Walter de Stapledon, English nobleman and bishop (b. 1261)
- October 27 – Hugh Despenser the Elder, English chief adviser (b. 1261)
- October 31 – Juan de Castilla y Haro ("Juan the One-Eyed"), Spanish nobleman (b. 1293)
- November 17 – Edmund FitzAlan, 9th Earl of Arundel, English nobleman and knight (b. 1285)
- November 24 – Hugh Despenser the Younger, English knight (b. 1286)
- November 25 – Koreyasu, Japanese nobleman and shogun (b. 1264)
- December 28 – David II Strathbogie, Earl of Atholl, Scottish nobleman and constable
- date unknown
  - Alexander of San Elpidio, Italian friar, bishop and writer (b. 1269)
  - Al-Yunini, Syrian religious scholar, historian and writer (b. 1242)
  - Amanieu VII d'Albret, French nobleman and knight (House of Albret)
  - David of Grodno, Lithuanian nobleman, knight and castellan, killed
  - John Palaiologos, Byzantine nobleman and governor (b. 1288)
  - John Walwayn, English scholar, official and Lord Treasurer
  - Mondino de Liuzzi, Italian physician and anatomist (b. 1270)
  - Ser Petracco, Italian jurist, chancellor and politician (b. 1267)
  - Sheikh Edebali, Ottoman judge and religious leader (b. 1206)
  - William de Braose, Norman nobleman and knight (b. 1260)
