= Bridget Bennet =

English book collector

- Born: before 1668 prob. Nottinghamshire
- Died: after 1699
- Known for: her book collections
- Spouse: John Bennet, 1st Baron Ossulston

Bridget Bennet, née Howe (before 1668 - after 1699), was an English book collector. She lived in London and her husband was a member of Parliament who became Baron Ossulston. Her notes and the lists of her books give an insight into her interests, book-lending and self-education.

== Life ==
Bennet's birthplace and date are unknown, but she was the daughter of John Grobham Howe (1625–1679) and Lady Annabella Scroope (d. 1704). Her father came from Langar in Nottinghamshire and her mother was the illegitimate daughter of Emmanuel, first earl of Sunderland. In 1668, she was in Paris and in 1673 she married. Her husband Sir John Bennet was a Knight of the Bath he was a Lieutenant of the Honourable Corps of Gentlemen at Arms.

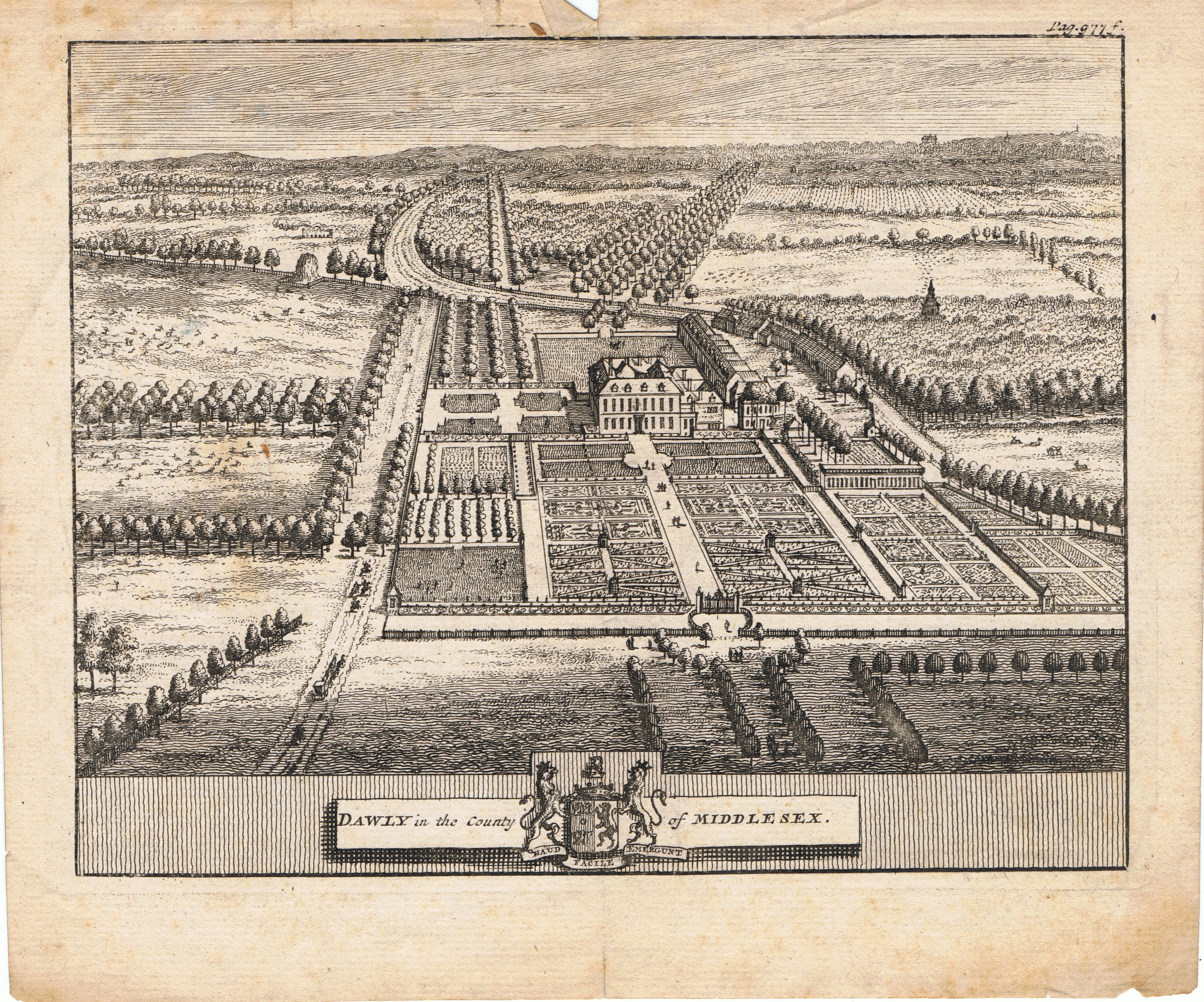
Dawley House

Her new husband had been a member of Parliament for a decade and he had houses in Golden Square in Westminster and Dawley in Harlington, Middlesex. Her husband became Lord Ossulston, Baron Ossulston on 24 November 1682.

Her records show that, on 4 May 1699, she had 206 books, three of which were non-English. By then she had been widowed for four years. The first known catalogue of her library of books was dated 1680 but it appears to have been kept up to date until 1689. That catalogue was of 223 books but there was a large variation in the two lists. The 1680 list included 35 books in French, including leading women authors Hortense Mancini, Marie-Catherine de Villedieu and Madame de La Fayette. The differences in the collections may be due to Bennet sharing her books. She lent books to others, including her nephew Henry FitzRoy, 1st Duke of Grafton (the King's son), "Mrs Reverwest" (unidentified) and over a dozen books to her son Charles. The records show that she moved books between the two houses.

The lists show her changing interests, particularly about medicine at the time that her daughter died, and also about the education of women. She owned contemporary writings, including Dialogue concerning women, being a defence of the sex written to Eugenia by William Walsh in 1691, Nahum Tate's A Present for the Ladies: being an Historical Vindication of the Female Sex from the following year and John Dunton's book The Challenge sent by a young lady to Sir Thomas &c., or, The Female War which was published in 1697. These three are all supportive of women at the time and she obtained them soon after publication.

It is unclear when she died, but in 1722 the catalogue of over 700 books was probably complied after her death, and it was after the death of her son Charles. The books were valued at £115 and one third of these titles were present in her earlier catalogues. However, nearly half of the books that she owned in 1680 did not survive into the 1722 list.

== See also ==
- Frances Wolfreston (1607–1677), another Englishwoman who collected books
