= William Wrightson =

William Wrightson may refer to:

- William Wrightson (MP, born 1676) (1676–1760), British landowner and politician, MP for Newcastle upon Tyne, and for Northumberland
- William Wrightson (MP for Aylesbury) (1752–1827), British landowner and politician

== See also ==
- William Battie-Wrightson (1789–1879), British landowner and politician, MP for East Retford, for Kingston upon Hull, and for Northallerton
