= Thomas Umfraville =

14th-century English politician

Sir Thomas Umfraville (c1362-1391) was an English landowner, soldier, administrator, diplomat, and politician who sat in the Parliament of England as member for Northumberland in 1388 and 1390 and also served as High Sheriff of Northumberland in 1388.

== Origins ==
Born about 1362, he was the son and heir of Thomas Umfraville (c1320-1387), a member of the Umfraville family that had been influential on the northern border of England and also in Scotland since about 1120. His grandfather was Robert Umfraville, 3rd Earl of Angus, and his grandmother, the earl's second wife, was named Eleanor, possibly Eleanor Lumley. His mother was Joan Roddam, daughter of Adam Roddam.

In 1364 his father's half-brother Gilbert Umfraville, 4th Earl of Angus, had made his father one of his two heirs if he died without surviving children or grandchildren. This arrangement was confirmed in 1378 after Gilbert's only son died without children, with the deed naming both Thomas the father and Thomas the son, then aged about 16. When the Earl died in 1381, Thomas the father inherited extensive estates:

in County Durham, the manors of Edmondsley and Farnacres together with holdings in Gateshead and Ravensworth, the manor of Wheatley, the village of Holmside, and other land in the environs of Durham;
in Northumberland, the manors of Harbottle and Otterburn and other properties in and around the villages of Kirkwhelpington and Alwinton;
in Yorkshire, the manor of Hessle.

Part of this inheritance remained in the hands of the Earl's widow Maud, but she became a valuable connection when in 1383 she married Henry Percy, 1st Earl of Northumberland. When Thomas the father died in May 1387, the son became one of northern England's prominent landowners.

== Career ==
In 1387 he was knighted and embarked on a public career, being chosen as a commissioner of gaol delivery for Newcastle-upon-Tyne in February and sitting on a royal commission to investigate rival claims to the manor of Eslington at Whittingham in July. In the English Parliament of 1388, convened in February, he was elected for one of the two county seats. That year he was on the Northumberland commission of array in both June and August and was chosen as county sheriff in December. During parliamentary sittings, he must have been party to the attacks on supporters of King Richard II and to the trials for treason of some of the King's closest associates. For two of these, Richard Clifford, future bishop of Worcester and of London, and Nicholas Blake, dean of the Chapel Royal, he stood surety on their release from the Tower of London in June, which suggests he felt sympathy for their fate.

Heading back North, he was busy in preparations for the expiry of the truce with Scotland in June. The Scots under the Earl of Douglas invaded Northumberland and in August defeated the English at the Battle of Otterburn. Present at the battle, he escaped the fate of his relation by marriage, Sir Henry Percy, who was captured.

In February next year he was again a commissioner of gaol delivery at Newcastle-upon-Tyne and sat on six different royal commissions: to survey Bamburgh Castle in February; to impose order on the garrison at Berwick-upon-Tweed in March; to deal with concealments in March; to examine measures for weighing coal exports in April; to assess damage by Scottish invaders in May; and to settle the estates of Henry Delaval in November. Also in 1389 he was appointed as Captain of Roxburgh Castle and as a justice of the peace for Northumberland, holding both offices for the rest of his life.

In December he was England's envoy to negotiate with the Scots over violations of the fresh truce between the two nations. In the Parliament of 1390, convened in January, he was once more an MP for the county and in both March and May served again as English envoy to Scotland regarding arrangements for peace talks. His growing local, national, and international influence ended with his early death on 12 February 1391, aged about twenty-nine.

== Family and legacy ==
Around 1380, he married Agnes Grey, the daughter of Sir Thomas Grey and his wife Margaret Presson, who survived him and died on 25 October 1420. Together they had five daughters and one son:

Elizabeth Umfraville, born about 1381 and died in 1424, who married Sir William Elmedon of Embleton.
Maud Umfraville, born about 1383 and died in 1435, who married Sir William Ryther of Ryther.
Joan Umfraville, born about 1385 and died after 1446, who married Sir Thomas Lambert.
Margaret Umfraville, born about 1389 and died in 1444, who married first William Lodington of Gunby and secondly Sir John Constable of Halsham.
Agnes Umfraville, born about 1390 and died after 1446, who married Thomas Haggerston of Haggerston.
Gilbert Umfraville, later Sir Gilbert, born and baptised at Harbottle on 18 October 1390 and died on 22 March 1421 at Beaugé, who married Anne, daughter of Ralph Neville, 1st Earl of Westmorland and his wife Margaret, daughter of Hugh Stafford, 2nd Earl of Stafford.

As Sir Gilbert left no children, his heirs were his five sisters. Some of his lands went to his uncle Sir Robert Umfraville (c1365-1437), younger brother of his father.
