= Fenwick baronets =

Extinct baronetcy in the Baronetage of England

Escutcheon of the Fenwick baronets

The Fenwick Baronetcy, of Fenwick in the County of Northumberland, was a title in the Baronetage of England. It was created on 9 June 1628 for Sir John Fenwick, of Wallington Hall, Northumberland. He sat as Member of Parliament for Northumberland, and was elected for Cockermouth in 1641. The second and third Baronets also represented Northumberland in Parliament. The title became extinct when the third Baronet was executed for treason on 27 January 1697.

The ancient family of Fenwick had its seat from the 12th century at Fenwick Tower, Matfen, Northumberland, and later from the 16th century at Wallington Hall.

== Fenwick baronets, of Fenwick (1628) ==
- Sir John Fenwick, 1st Baronet (c. 1573 – c. 1658)
- Sir William Fenwick, 2nd Baronet (c. 1617 – 1676)
- Sir John Fenwick, 3rd Baronet (1644–1697)

Baronetage of England
Preceded by Fowler baronets	Fenwick baronets of Fenwick; 9 June 1628	Succeeded by Wrey baronets
