= Robert de Umfraville =

English knight, Lord of Redesdale

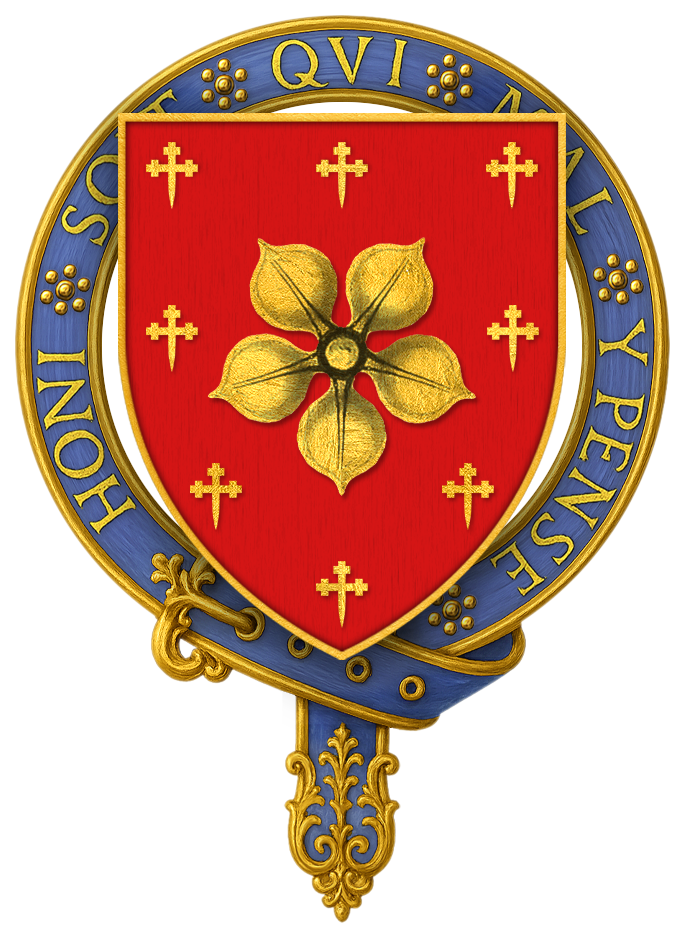
Arms of Sir Robert de Umfraville, KG: Gules a cinquefoil within an orle of eight crosses pattée or.

Sir Robert de Umfraville KG, Lord of Redesdale (c. 1363 – 1437) was a knight in late-medieval England who took part in the later stages of the Hundred Years' War, particularly against Scotland. The de Umfraville family had been influential in northeast England for centuries and also held major estates in Yorkshire. His ancestors were mormaers of Angus, and his nephew married into the Percies, a powerful local marcher family with whom de Umfraville was closely associated. Much of Sir Robert's career continued on the same path as his ancestors, being primarily focused on defending the border with Scotland, which had been in a state of near-permanent warfare since the late thirteenth century.

Robert de Umfraville fought under three English kings. Beginning his career under Richard II, he probably fought at the Battle of Otterburn with Henry "Hotspur" Percy in 1388. After Richard was deposed by Henry IV in 1399, de Umfraville loyally served the new Lancastrian regime, waging both offensive and defensive military operations against the Scots. Where necessary, he was also an effective diplomat, taking part in many embassies to Scotland and negotiating treaties. With the exception of Henry V's resumption of the Hundred Years' War in 1415—when de Umfraville travelled with the king to France, where he may have taken part in the Battle of Agincourt—all his military activity was on the Scottish border. He was famed for his martial prowess; one contemporary chronicler, John Hardyng, who was in de Umfraville's service, lauded him as the perfect knight. De Umfraville's successes in the north attracted praise and reward from the king. One campaign deep into Scottish territory resulted in his destroying Peebles and its market; he brought back so much booty that he was popularly nicknamed "Robin Mendmarket".

De Umfraville married but did not have children. His nephew and closest relative, Gilbert, predeceased him, perishing at the Battle of Baugé in 1421. He remained in royal service almost to the last months of his life, but this service was of uncertain financial profitability. Most of his northern lands would have been prone to frequent ravaging by marauding armies, so his Midlands estates may have been his main source of income. He carried out his last mission to Scotland in March 1436 and died early the next year.

== Background ==
Robert de Umfraville was the youngest son of Sir Thomas de Umfraville, who died in 1387. His family had been important in Anglo-Scottish relations and on the border since the twelfth century; King Henry I had granted de Umfraville's ancestor and namesake major estates in Northumberland as a bulwark against the Scots. The original grant refers to de Umfraville as having to defend England against "enemies and wolves". The de Umfravilles also counted the Earls of Angus amongst their ancestors. The family owned much land around the Redesdale area, consisting of the around 138,000-acre (56,000 ha) old Regality of Redesdale. However, both the impact of the Scottish wars and the growth of other, newer regional families, such as the Nevilles, had led to a decline in the family's status by the fifteenth century. Robert himself, a minor at his father's death, became a ward of Ralph Neville, Earl of Westmorland.

== Early career ==
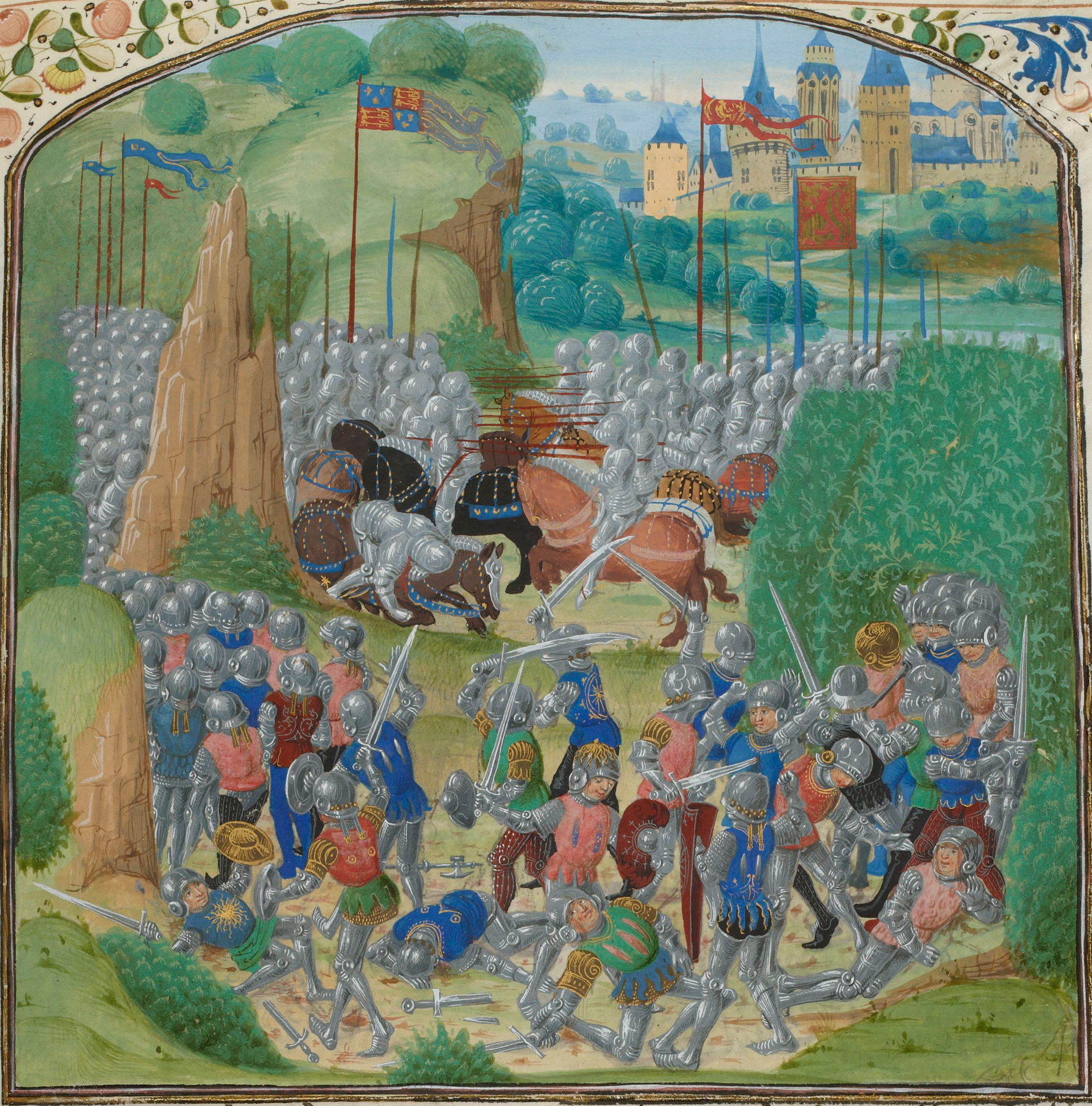
The Battle of Otterburn, 1388, from a fifteenth-century depiction; this was probably one of de Umfraville's earliest military campaigns.

Robert de Umfraville spent his early career in the military. He began sitting on royal commissions in Northumberland in the 1390s. The chronicler John Hardyng (Note: The chronicle was transcribed and published in 1812 by Henry Ellis.) reports that de Umfraville fought at the 1388 Battle of Otterburn under Henry Hotspur, son and heir of Henry, Earl of Northumberland. Hotspur was defeated and captured by the Scots. Otterburn was followed, says Hardyng, in 1390 by the first of many border raids de Umfraville led into Scotland. These raids were continued even after the deposition of King Richard II by his cousin Henry Bolingbroke in 1399. In spite of the regime change, de Umfraville's duties continued in the same vein, and the "old truths remained: royal service, local administration and the defence of the realm", as the medievalist Gwilym Dodd puts it. De Umfraville was indentured (Note: An indenture in late medieval England was a legal contract written in duplicate on the same sheet, which was then divided into two portions along a jagged line. The tooth-like appearance of this division provided the name. Subsequently, when one or other parties to the contract needed to prove its authenticity, the teeth of the two parts would match perfectly..) to join Henry IV's invasion of Scotland in 1400, although in the event the campaign achieved little, neither gaining territory for the English nor inflicting heavy damage on the Scots. De Umfraville subsequently defeated a large Scots army at Fulhope Law after an attempted Scottish raid. He was appointed Sheriff of Northumberland in 1401 and may have taken part in the defeat of the Scots army at the Battle of Homildon Hill in 1403. He continued his defence of the border through the next decade, and his expertise in local politics saw him appointed to advise the Warden of the Eastern March, the king's son, John, Duke of Bedford. This was probably in the capacity of sub-warden to the duke, in the middle march. In 1407, with his young nephew Gilbert de Umfraville, he attended, as a tenant-in-chief, the enthronement of the new Bishop of Durham, Thomas Langley. It is thought that Hardyng received the king's permission to enter de Umfraville's service around this point, following the death of Hardyng's previous patron, Hotspur, at the Battle of Shrewsbury in 1403.

== Royal service ==
De Umfraville's loyalty to the new regime was appreciated by King Henry IV, who retained him for life with an annuity of £40. At some point, he was also knighted by the king; historian Henry Summerson has said this was designed "to ensure his loyalty against the Percys, his former lords" who were growing increasingly dissatisfied with the new king. As part of the same strategy, in 1404 Henry instructed the Earl of Northumberland to hand over command of Berwick Castle to de Umfraville. The king's support for de Umfraville paid off when, in 1405, Richard Scrope, Archbishop of York, rebelled. De Umfraville persuaded Ralph, Earl of Westmorland to strike swiftly, and with a hastily raised force, they suppressed the uprising at Shipton Moor. In acknowledgement of the role he had played in defending the crown's interests, de Umfravile was made keeper of Warkworth Castle for life the same year, and appointed Hardyng his constable. De Umfraville also received a lifetime grant of the lordship of Langley.

In 1408 the continuing tension between the crown and the Earl of Northumberland came to a head, and the Earl rebelled, albeit unsuccessfully: he was defeated and killed at the Battle of Bramham Moor that year. De Umfraville appears to have played no part in the downfall of his old master. However, uncommonly for a younger son, shortly after—and reflecting his high standing with the king—de Umfraville was elected to the Order of the Garter. He took the stall of Edmund, Earl of Kent, who had died earlier in the year. De Umfraville was the only Percy retainer that King Henry made an effort to reconcile to him; as a "border warlord with impeccable lineage", he earned great rewards from the crown while still commanding the respect of what remained of the Percy affinity in the northwest. At the same time, his diplomatic work with Scotland increased as the result of the Percys' fall.

Robert de Umfraville had a close relationship with his nephew Gilbert, the son of Robert's elder brother Thomas, who had died in 1391. By 1413, Gilbert had married Anne, daughter of Ralph, Earl of Westmorland, further strengthening de Umfraville's position in the northeast. He was probably responsible for Gilbert's military training, as the two spent the years prior to 1410 on the border. In 1408, for example, they jointly led a raid into Teviotdale: Hardyng describes how de Umfraville was like an "olde dogge [that] hath grete joy to bayte (Note: "Bayte" in this context means to unleash, i.e. de Umfraville gladly unleashed Gilbert over the border, making, so Hardyng continues, the Scottish wives swear "by Seynt Rynyon".) his whelpe". The raids continued, with another soon after on Jedburgh. De Umfraville's service for the king was not confined to the northern border, and neither was it confined to fighting on land. In 1410, he was appointed lieutenant to Sir Thomas Beaufort, the Admiral of the Seas. In this capacity, following the burning of Roxburgh by the Scots, de Umfraville commanded a force of ten ships and 600 men and destroyed Scottish shipping sheltered in the Firth of Forth, possibly using fire ships, and captured 13 or 14 others. As a result of these successes, he was appointed captain of Roxburgh in place of John Neville, the Earl of Westmorland's son. By now, de Umfraville was owed £666 from the exchequer for his naval expedition. Two years later, Bishop Langley paid de Umfraville 100 marks to repair the walls of Berwick Castle, which by this time were in some disrepair.

== The 'Southampton Plot,' service in France and return ==
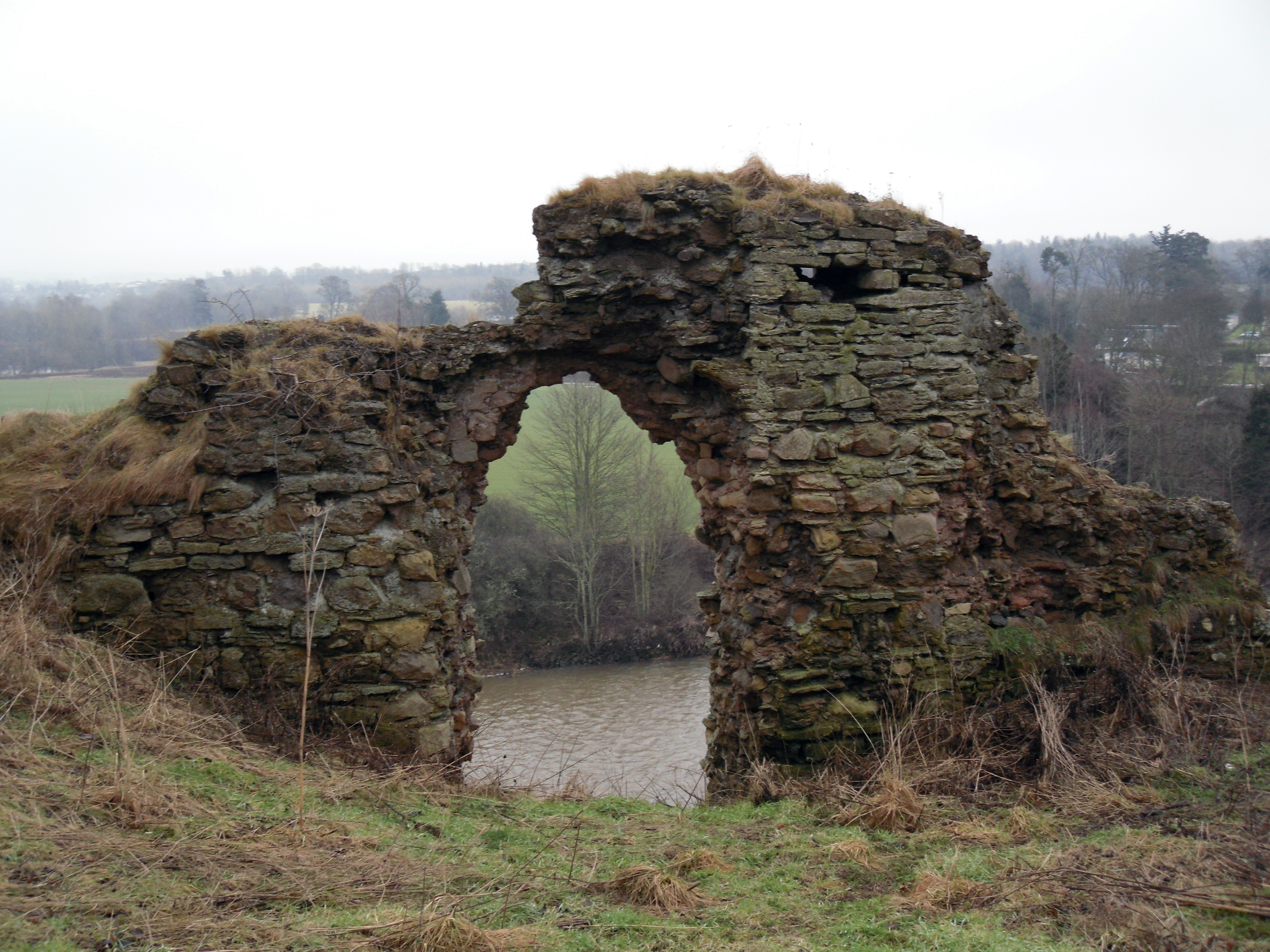
Part of the remains of Roxburgh Castle (in 2007), the focus of much of de Umfraville's career.

Henry IV died in March 1413 and was succeeded by his son, Henry of Monmouth, as King Henry V. The new king's attention soon focused on the English claim to the French throne, and by early 1415 war with France was inevitable. Just before the English army was due to depart Southampton Dock, the king received word of a plot against him. A few days later, de Umfraville was summoned to Henry's presence; Summmerson has speculated that Henry suspected de Umfraville of involvement, and perhaps "harbouring a residual loyalty to the Percys", the restoration of which family in the north was one of the plotters' aims. Perhaps indicating the king's displeasure, de Umfraville was also relieved of his captaincy of Roxburgh at the same time. On the other hand, de Umfraville had valuable military experience, and Henry subsequently confirmed him in his £40 annuity. Either way, de Umfraville is known to have been present at the siege of Harfleur, and possibly the Battle of Agincourt. He had presumably cleared himself, in Henry's eyes, by the following year when he indentured with the king to serve in Normandy until 1417. That year he returned to Northumberland and to border service.

De Umfraville's return was timely; the Duke of Albany attacked Berwick in 1417. His "foul raid"—"foul" being a contemporary corruption for "fool" or "foolish"—broke the existing truce. On 3 August that year de Umfraville (as chamberlain of Berwick) was informed that Albany intended to invade England with an army of 60,000 and besiege Berwick. E. F. Jacob has suggested that de Umfraville might have encouraged the Scots to raid over the border deliberately, "only to destroy them". He spent the next two years leading retaliatory, and savage, raids of "almost continuous harassment" into southern Scotland. This climaxed in 1419 with his assault upon the town of Peebles, which he burnt to the ground on market day; this earned him both much booty and the moniker "Robin Mendmarket". (Note: Occasionally rendered Robyne.) Hardyng describes how de Umfraville, being determined that not all the glory should be earned solely by those fighting the French, "made the warre on Scottes to have a name" for himself. As Alexander Rose put it, while Henry V was "sacking Caen and advancing into undefended Bayeux and Lisieux... Sir Robert de Umfraville, his most ruthless lieutenant [had] free rein to tear south-eastern Scotland savagely apart for two years". Hardying commented benevolently upon de Umfraville's winning of prisoners and glory.

== Later years ==
Sir Robert had married by 1419; nothing is known of his wife except that she was named Isabella. The same year he is also recorded, with his wife, as taking membership of the Durham confraternity. De Umfraville also appears to have been friends with the Prior of Durham, John Wessington, with whom he dined at Durham Priory on at least one occasion. Wessington had not only granted him his letters of confraternity but had been entrusted by de Umfraville with important family title deeds. In 1428, he was licensed to grant his manor of Farnacres, near Newcastle upon Tyne for the use of a chantry chapel, one of the few that was free-standing. The chapel, de Umfraville instructed, should be devoted to the souls of himself, his wife, Kings Henry IV and V, and to each past, present and future member of the Order of the Garter.

In 1421 de Umfraville acted as his nephew's executor, following Gilbert's death in the disastrous English defeat at the Battle of Baugé. From him, de Umfraville inherited the Redesdale and Kyme estates and £400. He had already lost his lordship of Langley in 1414 when the second Earl of Northumberland was restored to his patrimony. It was with this Henry Percy that Sir Robert spent much of the remainder of his military career in the East March. This was as both a warrior and a diplomat—for instance in 1425, he was sent to King James to assist with ongoing negotiations, although the results of that particular embassy are unknown. His duties also involved administrative work such as presiding over the Warden's Marcher Court, negotiating temporary truces and attending peace conferences. He continued to keep the peace in his home county as well; in his own words, he wished to see "gude rest and pece to be had in the cuntre". A major case he was involved in was between the feuding gentry families led by William Heron (of Ford Castle), and John Manners of Etal, between 1428 and 1431. In this case, as a feoffee to Heron—and being one of "the two most powerful knights in the county"—de Umfraville took the part of Heron's wife, Isabel, after Heron was killed by Manners while assaulting Etal castle. This event, comments James Raine, "abounds with incident, characterising, at the same time, the pugnacious state of the borders [and] the total absence of everything in the shape of legal redress". De Umfraville's associate, Prior Wessington, acted as an umpire in the subsequent arbitration. On 3 April 1428, de Umfraville told Wessington that he would request Isabel's lawsuit in chancery be withdrawn if Manners would pay a surety of 400 marks (Note: A medieval English mark was an accounting unit equivalent to two-thirds of a pound.) to Heron's widow. De Umfraville also demanded that Manners helped him redeem the Heron estates from royal custody, in return for which he would try and persuade the widow to reduce the amount of compensation she was claiming. On 23 April, Manners indentured himself to de Umfraville's "lytill and esy tretye", as it was termed, to pay all Heron's debts and to establish chantries for those that died during the course of their dispute. A tripartite indenture was eventually agreed and delivered at Newcastle on 24 May 1431, which de Umfraville attended, and where he received the first instalment of the 250 marks compensation he and Heron's widow were now due from John Manners.

== Death and legacy ==
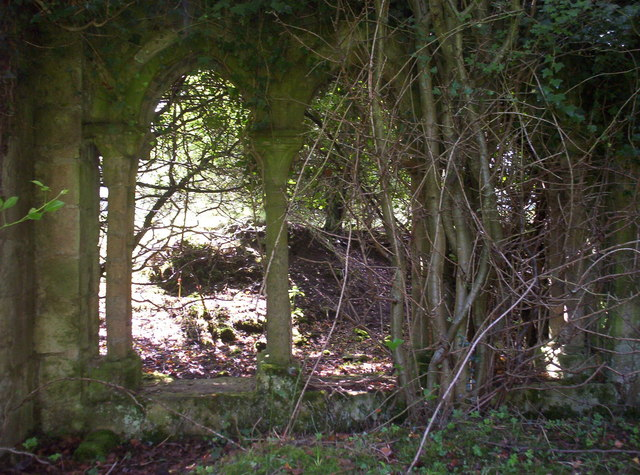
The overgrown ruins of de Umfraville's burial place, Newminster Abbey, seen in 2006

Historian Chris Given-Wilson has described de Umfraville as one of "the most renowned warriors of their day". This reflects a contemporary image of him as a fifteenth-century hero: in 1426 the royal council, on behalf of the then-four-year-old King Henry VI, wrote to him, thanking him for his "great and notable services… to your most renowned honour and praise and to the advantage of us and our whole realm". Hardyng called de Umfraville "a Jewell for a kynge, in wyse consayle and knyghtly dede of werre" as well as a "vision of the ideal knight... brave and wise in war, generous and loyal to his followers, a lover of justice and protector of the common good". De Umfraville received his last commission to organise a truce with Scotland in March 1436; he died on 27 January the following year, leaving no will. He was buried in Newminster Abbey, where his wife, who died less than two years later in 1438, was to be buried beside him.

Since Gilbert had been de Umfraville's closest relative, and he and Isabelle had had no children, his estates passed to a distant relative, Sir William Tailboys. How much these lands were actually worth, however, Summerson has queried. While his manors around Redesdale covered over 25,000 acres (10,000 ha), the near-permanent state of war that existed in the region makes it likely that these estates had been greatly ravaged, possibly to the point of worthlessness. It may be that the only lands of de Umfraville's that were worth their full value at the time, Summerson says, were those of Gilbert's in Lincolnshire, which could have been worth up to £400 per annum. Robert de Umfraville's garter stall was taken by Richard Neville, Earl of Salisbury, in 1438.
