= Ralph Eure =

Ralph Eure may refer to:

- Ralph Eure (died 1545), MP for Scarborough
- Ralph Eure, 3rd Baron Eure (1558–1617)
- Ralph Eure, 8th Baron Eure, Baron Eure (died 1690)
- Ralph Euer, also known as Ralph Eure, English knight and MP
