= Cuthbert Horsley =

16th-century English politician

Cuthbert Horsley (by 1517 – by 1586), of Horsley, Northumberland, was an English politician.

== Education ==
Horsely was educated at Lincoln's Inn.

== Career ==
He was a Member (MP) of the Parliament of England for Appleby in 1542, Northumberland in October 1553, Newcastle-upon-Tyne in April 1554, Northumberland in November 1554 and 1559, and Morpeth in 1555.
