= Battle of Fulhope Law =

1400 battle of the Anglo-Scottish Wars

- Part of the Anglo-Scottish Wars
Date	September 1400
Location	Fulhope Law, Scotland
Result	English victory

Belligerents
Kingdom of England	Kingdom of Scotland

Commanders and leaders
Robert de Umfraville	Willie Barde; Adam Gordon

The Battle of Fulhope Law took place between Scottish raiders and the English garrisons of Jedburgh and Roxburgh castles in September 1400. The Scottish were routed and a large number of prisoners taken.

== Battle ==
Robert de Umfraville, led the English garrisons of Jedburgh and Roxburgh castles inflicting a defeat on a large Scots army at Fulhope Law after an attempted a raid. Prisoners included several border reivers, including the notorious fugitives Willie Barde and Adam, Lord of Gordon.
