= Dwight Ingle =

American physiologist and endocrinologist

- Born: Dwight Joyce Ingle; September 4, 1907; Latah County, Idaho
- Died: July 28, 1978 (aged 70)
- Education: University of Idaho, University of Minnesota
- Known for: Development of a bioassay that allowed the purification of cortisone
- Awards: Elected to the National Academy of Sciences in 1963
- Scientific career
- Fields: Endocrinology, physiology
- Institutions: University of Chicago
- Thesis: The reversal of fatigue in the adrenalectomized rat by glucose and other agents (1941)
- Doctoral advisor: William Thomas Heron

Dwight Joyce Ingle (September 4, 1907 – July 28, 1978) was an American physiologist and endocrinologist who was the chairman of the physiology department at the University of Chicago. His obituary in the National Academy of Sciences' Biographical Memoirs described him as "a first-rank, pioneering scientist in a new and uncharted field [i.e. endocrinology]."

Ingle is known for his development of a bioassay for adrenocortical hormones in rats that was used to purify cortisone. He conducted much of the research that led to the development of this assay while working at the company Upjohn. He later resigned from Upjohn after the company's owner insisted on marketing a compound that showed no activity when tested with Ingle's own assay. He also conducted pioneering research on the ergogenic effects of exposure to glucocorticoids.

He was also known for his controversial views on race and intelligence, arguing in 1961 that "there are reasons for thinking that racial differences in intelligence may be real", and for his criticisms of desegregation efforts, arguing that "the random mixing of races in schools and housing...[was] neither scientifically sound nor morally right."

When weighing in on the 'population problem' and the debate on federally funded sterilization of welfare beneficiaries, he is quoted as saying, "millions of people are unqualified for parenthood and should remain childless." As such, he was a well-known eugenicist.

Ingle was the founding editor-in-chief of Perspectives in Biology and Medicine, which was the first academic journal dedicated exclusively to the publication of essays. He served as the president of the Endocrine Society from 1959 to 1960. He was also a member of the National Academy of Sciences, a fellow of the American Association for the Advancement of Science, and a fellow of the American Academy of Arts and Sciences.
