= Charles Bennet, 2nd Earl of Tankerville =

British peer and politician

The Right Honourable The Earl of Tankerville KT
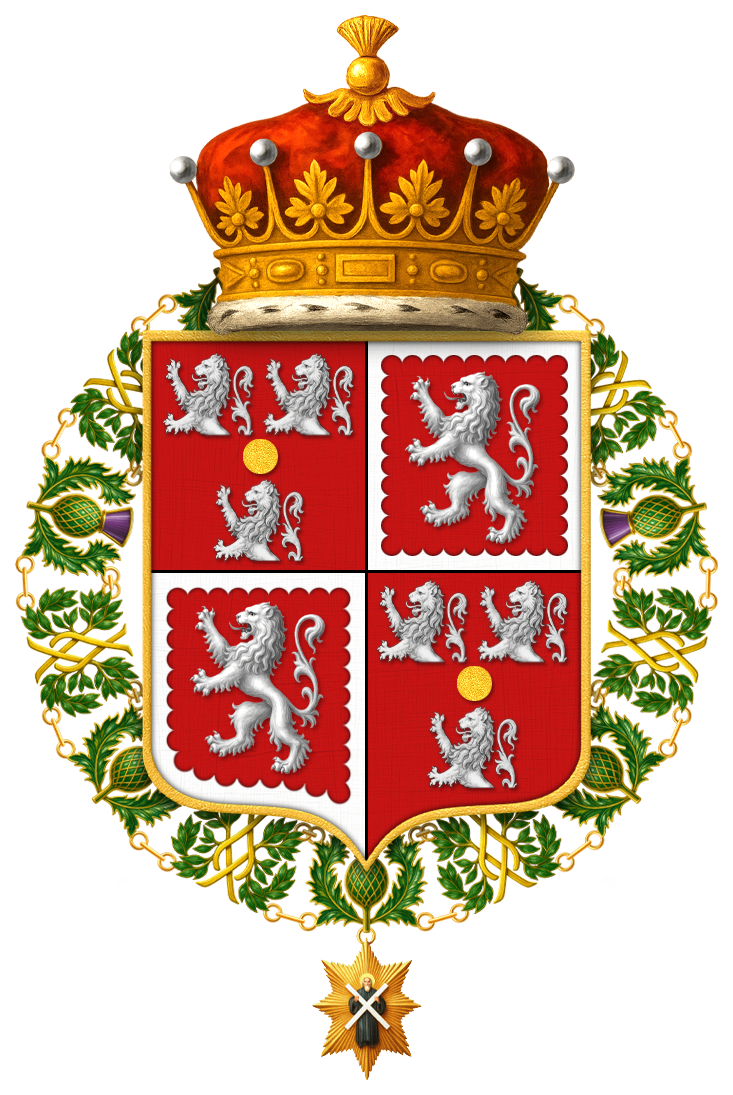

Captain of the Yeomen of the Guard
- In office 1733–1737
- Monarch: George II
- Prime Minister: Sir Robert Walpole
- Preceded by: The Earl of Ashburnham
- Succeeded by: The Duke of Manchester

Personal details
- Born: 21 December 1697
- Died: 14 March 1753 (aged 55)

Charles Bennet, 2nd Earl of Tankerville, KT (21 December 1697 – 14 March 1753), styled Lord Ossulston between 1714 and 1722, was a British peer and politician.

== Background ==
Tankerville was the son of Charles Bennet, 1st Earl of Tankerville, and Lady Mary, daughter of Ford Grey, 1st Earl of Tankerville. He was given the courtesy title Lord Ossulston when his father was created Earl of Tankerville in 1714.

== Political career ==
Tankerville succeeded his father in the earldom in 1722 and was appointed a Knight of the Thistle in 1730. He served as Captain of the Yeomen of the Guard under Sir Robert Walpole between 1733 and 1737. From 1740 to 1753 he was also Lord Lieutenant of Northumberland.

== Family ==
He married Camilla Colville c 1715. She served as a Lady of the Bedchamber to Queen Caroline and afterwards to the Princess Augusta.

Lord Tankerville died in March 1753, aged 56, and was succeeded in the earldom by his elder son Charles.

Political offices
Preceded by Francis Negus	Master of the Buckhounds; 1733–1737	Succeeded by Ralph Jenison
Preceded by The Earl of Ashburnham	Captain of the Yeomen of the Guard; 1733–1737	Succeeded by The Duke of Manchester
Honorary titles
Preceded by The Earl of Scarbrough	Lord Lieutenant of Northumberland; 1740–1753	Succeeded by The Duke of Northumberland
Peerage of Great Britain
Preceded by Charles Bennet	Earl of Tankerville; 1722–1753	Succeeded by Charles Bennet
