= Sir William Middleton, 3rd Baronet =

British landowner and Whig politician

Sir William Middleton, 3rd Baronet (c. 1700–1757) of Belsay Castle, Bolam, Northumberland, was a British landowner and Whig politician who sat in the House of Commons for 35 years from 1722 to 1757.

== Early life and family ==
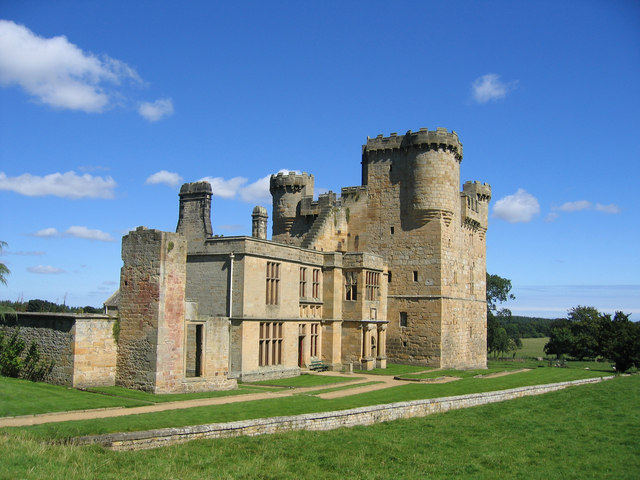
Belsay Castle, the former seat of the Middleton baronets of Belsay Castle

Middleton was the eldest son of Sir John Middleton, 2nd Baronet and his wife Frances Lambert, daughter of John Lambert of Calton, Yorkshire, and grand daughter of the Cromwellian general John Lambert. The Middleton family lived at Belsay in Northumberland from the thirteenth century. Middleton succeeded to the estates and baronetcy on the death of his father on 17 October 1717. While he was a minor, his chief trustee was the Presbyterian minister at Belsay. He owned a first-rate stud, bred from newly imported Arabian horses, and was a member of the Jockey Club. According to family tradition Middleton ‘was always borrowing money and always in debt’ He married Anne Ettrick, daughter of William Ettrick of Silksworth, county Durham in May 1725.

== Career ==
The Middleton family had represented Northumberland in Parliament since early in the fifteenth century. When Middleton came of age, he was returned unopposed as a Whig Member of Parliament for Northumberland at the 1722 general election. As a Presbyterian, he attracted the Presbyterian vote, of which the farmers made up a considerable part. He represented Northumberland for the rest of his life, and usually supported the Government. He was returned unopposed again at the 1727 general election and in a note of dissent, voted against the government on the Excise Bill of 1733. At the 1734 general election, there was a contest at Northumberland at enormous cost to the candidates, and Middleton's fellow candidate, Ralph Jenison, was financially crippled by it. In that parliament Middleton's dissent was expressed by a vote against the place bill of 1740. He was returned unopposed at the 1741 general election. In May 1742 under an opposition bill he was chosen as one of the commissioners of public accounts, but the bill was rejected in the House of Lords.

Middleton went with the Duke of Cumberland when he passed through Northumberland in January 1746 to assume command of the army in Scotland. Although Middleton was a civilian he was made a colonel and placed on the Duke's staff. At the 1747 and 1754 general elections, he was returned unopposed again for Northumberland. From 1754 was receiving a secret service pension of £800 per annum.

== Death and legacy ==
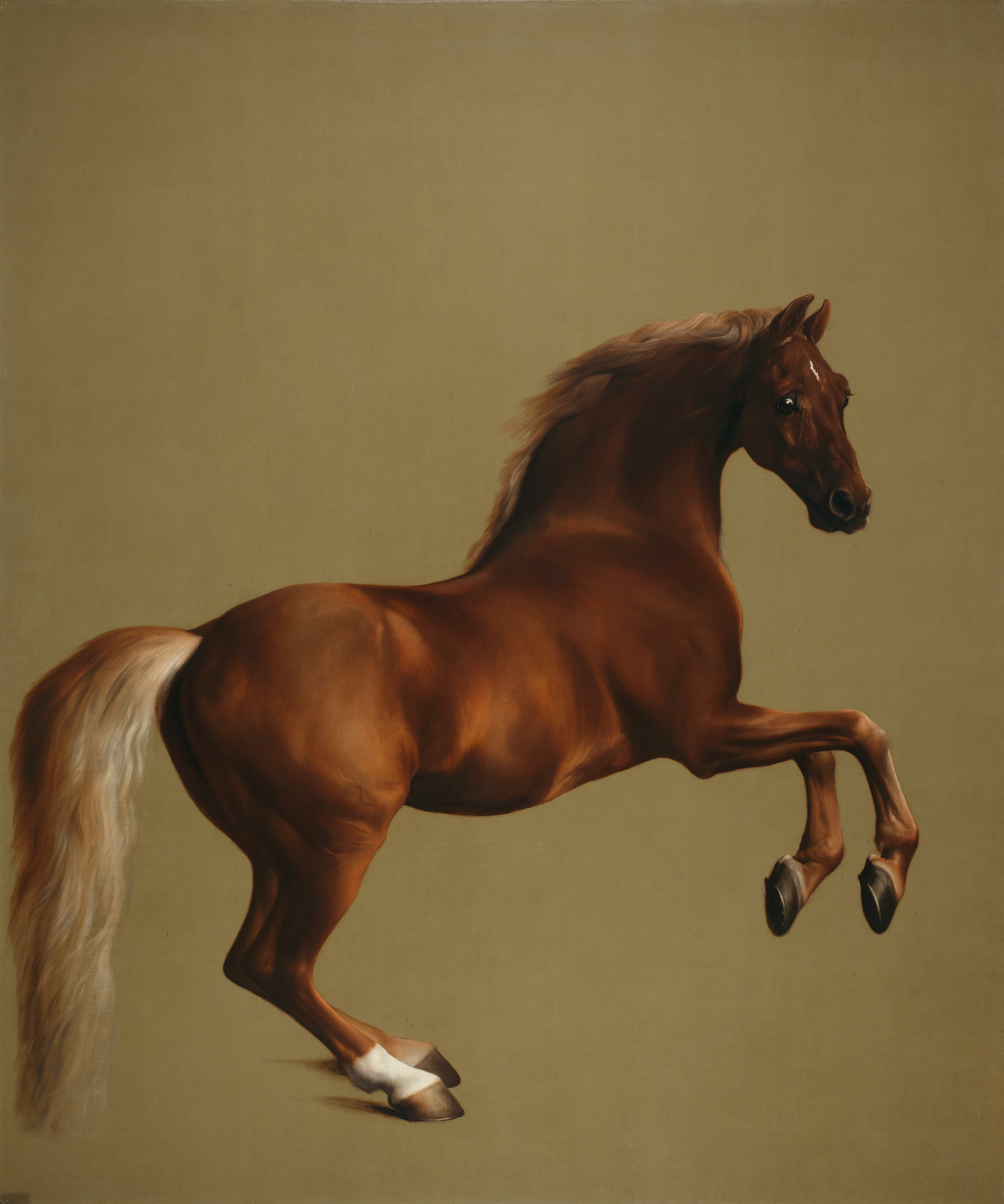
Whistlejacket, by George Stubbs.

Middleton died on 28 September 1757. He and his wife had one daughter and no male heirs. The baronetcy passed to his brother John Lambert Middleton. After his death the entire contents of the house, down to the pots and pans in the kitchen, were sold by auction to pay off his debts. The horses were also sold and Lord Rockingham bought Whistlejacket, one of his best horses.

Parliament of Great Britain
Preceded by Francis Blake Delaval; Earl of Hertford	Member of Parliament for Northumberland; 1722–1757; With: Earl of Hertford 1722-1723; William Wrightson 1723-1724; Ralph Jenison 1724-1741; John Fenwick 1741-1748; Lord Ossulston 1748-1749; Lancelot Allgood 1749-1754	Succeeded by George Shafto Delaval; Sir Henry Grey
Baronetage of England
Preceded by John Middleton	Baronet (of Belsay Castle); 1717-1757	Succeeded by John Lambert Middleton
