= Sir John Fenwick, 1st Baronet =

English landowner and politician (c. 1570 – c. 1658)

Sir John Fenwick, 1st Baronet (c. 1570 – c. 1658) of Wallington and Fenwick, Northumberland, was an English landowner and politician who sat in the House of Commons at various times between 1624 and 1648. He supported the Parliamentary cause in the Civil War.

== Biography ==
Fenwick was the son of Sir William Fenwick, who had been Sheriff of Northumberland in 1578 and 1589, and his first wife Grace Forster daughter of Sir John Forster of Edderstone and Hexham. He was knighted at Royston on 18 January 1605 and succeeded his father in 1618 at the age of 35. Fenwick himself also served as Sheriff in 1619–20 and 1644–45.

In 1624 and again in 1625, 1626 and 1628 Fenwick was elected member of parliament for Northumberland. He was created 1st Baronet Fenwick of Fenwick, on 9 June 1628. He was a successful racehorse breeder and became a favourite of Charles I for whom he acted as Master of the Royal Stud at Tutbury and, from 1639, Surveyor of the Royal Race (or Stud).

In April 1640, Fenwick was again elected MP for Northumberland to the Short Parliament and was then elected MP for Cockermouth to the Long Parliament in 1641. He was then re-elected for Northumberland in 1642 after Henry Percy was excluded. Fenwick himself was temporarily disabled from sitting in January 1644 but was re-admitted to Parliament in June 1646.

Fenwick owned substantial estates in Northumberland and Durham but financial difficulties caused him to sell the greater part of his holdings in 1650 to Sir William Blackett for £20,000. He retained the family seat at Wallington Hall.

== Family ==
He died in 1658 aged 79. He had married, firstly, Catherine Slingsby, daughter of Sir Henry Slingsby of Scriven, Yorkshire and Frances Vavasour, and had a son John and two daughters. He married, secondly, Grace Loraine, daughter of Thomas Loraine, and had further issue, including William. His third wife was named Bond.

His son and heir John was killed fighting on the Royalist side at the Battle of Marston Moor in 1644 and he was therefore succeeded by his second son William.

== Notes ==
Parliament of England
Preceded by Sir William Grey; Sir Henry Widdrington	Member of Parliament for Northumberland; 1624–1629; With: Sir Francis Brandling 1624–1625; Sir John Delaval 1626; Sir William Carnaby 1628–1629	Parliament suspended until 1640
Parliament suspended since 1629	Member of Parliament for Northumberland; 1640; With: Sir William Widdrington	Succeeded by Sir William Widdrington; Henry Percy
Preceded by Sir William Widdrington; Henry Percy	Member of Parliament for Northumberland; 1642–1648; With: Sir William Widdrington 1642; William Fenwick 1645–1648	Not represented in Rump Parliament
Baronetage of England
New creation	Baronet (of Fenwick); 1628 – c. 1658	Succeeded by William Fenwick
