= Charles Bennet, 3rd Earl of Tankerville =

British peer and politician

Charles Bennet, 3rd Earl of Tankerville (6 September 1716 – 27 October 1767), styled Lord Ossulston between 1722 and 1753, was a British peer and politician.

== Background ==
Tankerville was the son of Charles Bennet, 2nd Earl of Tankerville, and was educated as a gentleman commoner at Winchester College (around 1731).

== Political career ==
Tankerville was returned to Parliament for Northumberland in 1748, a seat he held until the following year, when he was unseated on petition. In 1753 he succeeded his father in the earldom and took his seat in the House of Lords.

== Family ==
Lord Tankerville married Alice, daughter of Sir John Astley, 2nd Baronet, in 1742. She died in 1755. Tankerville survived her by twelve years and died in October 1767, aged 51. He was succeeded in the earldom by his son, Charles.

Parliament of Great Britain
| Preceded by Sir Willian Middleton, Bt; John Fenwick | Member of Parliament for Northumberland; 1748–1749; With: Sir Willian Middleton, Bt | Succeeded by Sir Willian Middleton, Bt; Lancelot Allgood |
Peerage of Great Britain
| Preceded by Charles Bennet | Earl of Tankerville; 1753–1767 | Succeeded by Charles Bennet |
