= Charles Bennet, 1st Earl of Tankerville =

British peer

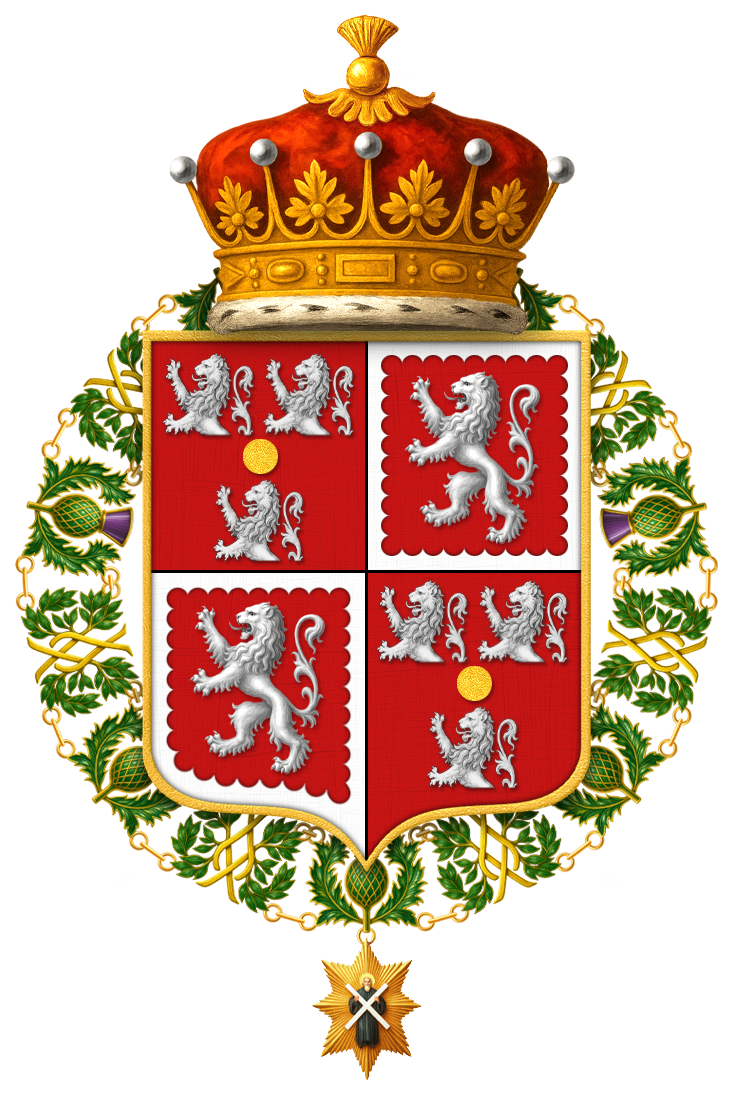
Shield of arms of Charles Bennet, 1st Earl of Tankerville, KT, surmounting the collar of the Order of the Thistle

Charles Bennet, 1st Earl of Tankerville KT PC (1674 – 21 May 1722), known as The Lord Ossulston between 1695 and 1714, was a British peer.

== Background ==
Tankerville was the son of the book collector Bridget Bennet and John Bennet, 1st Baron Ossulston.

== Political career ==
Tankerville succeeded his father in the barony in 1695 and was able to take a seat in the House of Lords. In 1714 he was created Earl of Tankerville, a revival of the title which had become extinct on the death of his father-in-law thirteen years earlier (see below). He was sworn of the Privy Council in 1716 and made a Knight of the Thistle in 1721.

== Family ==
Lord Tankerville married Lady Mary, daughter of Ford Grey, 1st Earl of Tankerville, in 1695. He died in May 1722 and was succeeded in his titles by his son, Charles.

Legal offices
Preceded by The Earl of Abingdon	Justice in Eyre; South of the Trent; 1715–1722	Succeeded by The Lord Cornwallis
Peerage of England
Preceded by John Bennet	Baron Ossulston; 1695–1722	Succeeded by Charles Bennet
Peerage of Great Britain
New creation	Earl of Tankerville; 1714–1722	Succeeded by Charles Bennet
