= Sir John Fenwick, 3rd Baronet =

English army officer, politician and Jacobite

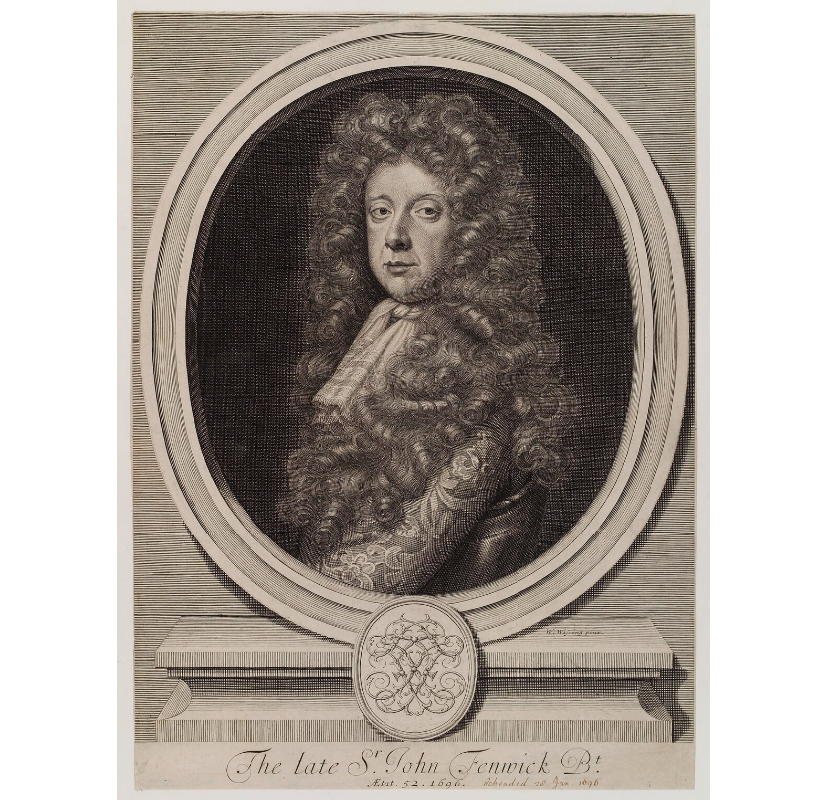
- Sir John Fenwick, 3rd Baronet by Robert White, after a portrait by Willem Wissing
- Born: c.1645
- Died: 28 January 1697; Tower Hill, London
- Cause of death: Beheading
- Burial place: St Martin-in-the-Fields
- Occupations: MP and Jacobite conspirator
- Known for: Executed for high treason
- Political party: Tories
- Spouse: Lady Mary Howard (m. 1663)
- Parent: Sir William Fenwick
- Relatives: Edward Howard, 2nd Earl of Carlisle (brother-in-law)

Sir John Fenwick, 3rd Baronet (c. 1645 – 28 January 1697) was an English Army officer and politician. He succeeded to the Fenwick baronetcy after the death of his father, Sir William Fenwick, in 1677 and became a court-supporting Tory member of parliament. After the Glorious Revolution in 1688, he became a supporter of the Jacobite cause. Fenwick was involved in the Fenwick plot and implicated in an associated conspiracy to assassinate William III of England, and he was executed by beheading in 1697 as a result. He was the last person to be executed under an act of attainder in England.

== Early life ==
Fenwick was the eldest son of Sir William Fenwick, or Fenwicke, a member of an old Northumberland family, and Jane (née Stapilton). He was raised without a formal education. Soon after arriving in London as a young man, on 14 July 1663 he married Lady Mary Howard, a daughter of Charles Howard, 1st Earl of Carlisle.

Fenwick entered the army, becoming a captain in 1667 and later serving in the Regiment Royal Anglais under James Scott, Duke of Monmouth in the Franco-Dutch War. In 1671, he was appointed a gentleman of the privy chamber to Charles II. On 5 February 1671, he fought a duel with John Churchill following a quarrel at a masquerade ball. He was among the English volunteers who served in the French army under Henri de La Tour d'Auvergne, Viscount of Turenne in the Third Anglo-Dutch War. In 1675 he became a colonel of a regiment of foot. He later fought alongside the Dutch, having been recommended to William of Orange, and was wounded in the face at the Siege of Maastricht in 1676. That same year, he returned to England to take over the family estates on the death of his father.

== Political career ==
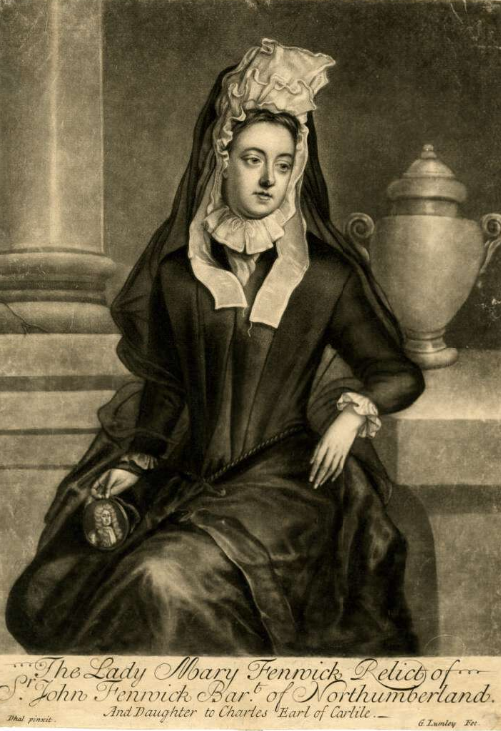
Lady Mary Fenwick (relict), the wife of Sir John Fenwick, engraving dated 1737

On 15 March 1677, Fenwick was returned in succession to his father as one of the Members of Parliament for Northumberland, a seat he would represent until 1687. He was elected on the court interest and was quickly identified by Shaftesbury as a strong opponent of the Exclusion Bill. In the Cavalier Parliament, he was appointed to five parliamentary committees. He retained his seat in all three of the exclusion parliaments. In the March 1679 English general election, he contributed £1,000 to the election expenses of Sir Ralph Delaval, 1st Baronet to ensure his victory in face of a challenge from Ralph Widdrington. Despite losing the personal support of the Tory magnate Henry Cavendish, 2nd Duke of Newcastle, Fenwick was returned to the Loyal Parliament as a Tory in May 1685, "amid great rejoicings" in Northumberland.

He had retained his army commission, and in June 1685 he was sent north to take command of local government forces during Argyll's Rising. As a strong partisan of James II, Fenwick was one of the principal supporters of the act of attainder against the Duke of Monmouth after the Monmouth Rebellion. In 1687, he became colonel of Fenwick's Regiment of Horse. By the late 1680s, Fenwick had been appointed to several local offices, including as a justice of the peace for Northumberland, Middlesex and Westminster, a deputy lieutenant for Northumberland, and a common councilman in Berwick-upon-Tweed.

== Glorious Revolution ==
During the Glorious Revolution in 1688, Fenwick, by then a major-general, was placed in command of 4,000 soldiers at Windsor. However, many of his men quickly deserted to join William of Orange's forces. Fenwick's brother-in-law, Edward Howard, 2nd Earl of Carlisle, asked Fenwick to assume responsibility for maintaining order in London during the revolution, but he refused. Instead, he accompanied Louis de Duras, 2nd Earl of Feversham to escort James II back to London from Rochester, and then resigned his army commission so that he would not have to serve another monarch. Upon taking his leave of James, the king implored Fenwick to use to his influence to prevent parliament from excluding the Prince of Wales from the throne.

Facing financial problems, in 1688 he sold the rump of the family estates and Wallington Hall to Sir William Blackett for £4,000 and an annuity of £2,000 a year. The annuity was to be paid for his lifetime and that of his wife, Mary. Blackett was happy with the deal as he discovered lead on the land and became rich.

== Jacobite conspirator ==
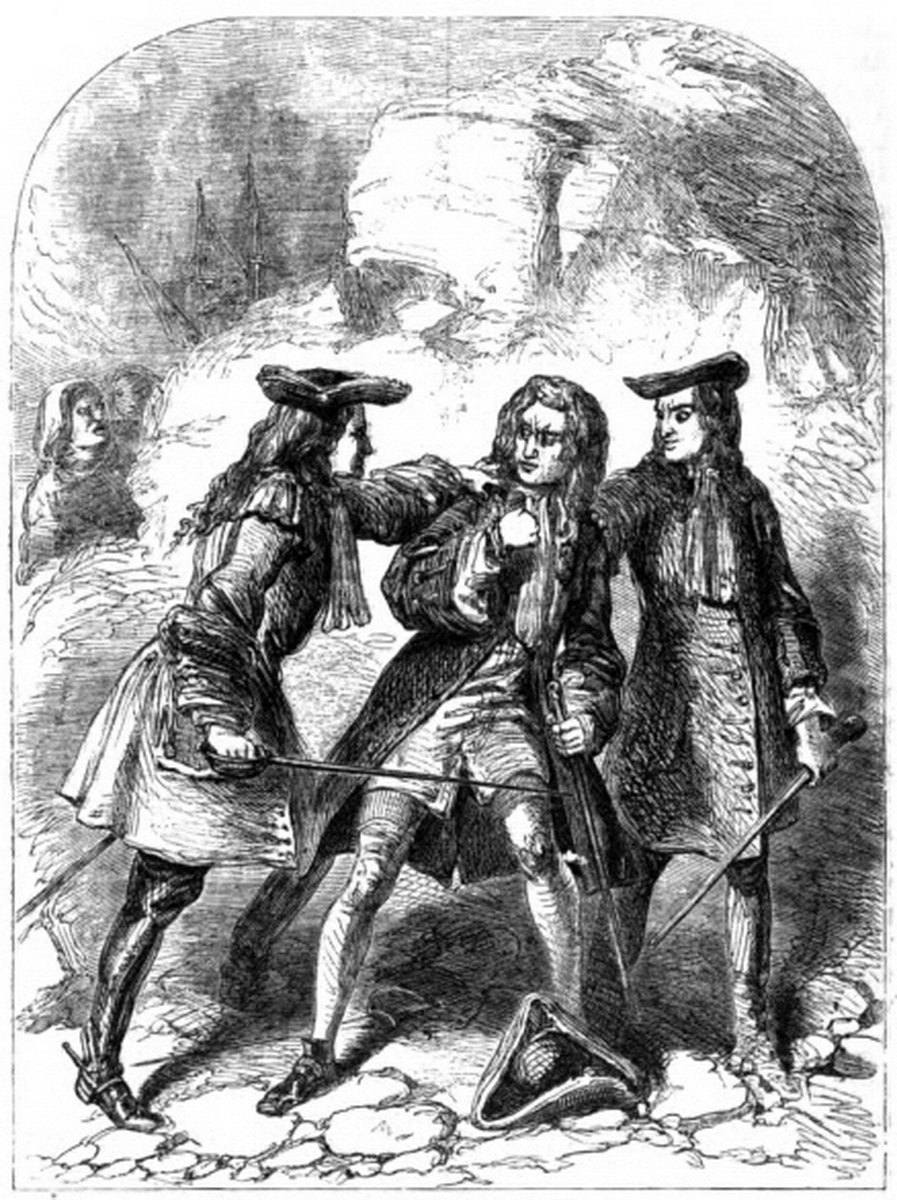
Fenwick's arrest in 1696 (as later imagined in 1865)

After the Glorious Revolution, Fenwick began to plot against the new King William, and he was in regular correspondence with the exiled Stuart court at Château de Saint-Germain-en-Laye. He was in the north of England fomenting Jacobite agitation in late 1688 and early 1689, for which he underwent a short imprisonment in the Tower of London in 1689 from May to October. Renewing his plots on his release, in 1691 Fenwick publicly insulted Queen Mary in public in Hyde Park, London by refusing to doff his hat. On 9 July 1692, he was again arrested briefly for involvement in Jacobite rioting in Drury Lane. He gave his name to the Fenwick plot – a scheme to seize a port on the south coast of England to enable a pro-Jacobite French invasion – and the Duke of Berwick claimed that "two thousand horse" were ready to take to the field under Fenwick in support of King James.

As such, it is practically certain that he was aware of the schemes for capturing or assassinating William which came to light in 1695 and 1696. After the seizure of his fellow Jacobite conspirators, Robert Charnock and others, Fenwick remained in hiding until the imprudent conduct of his friends in attempting to induce one of the witnesses against him to leave the country led to his arrest on 13 June 1696.

After Fenwick's apprehension, he was confined to Newgate Prison. On 9 September, he was brought before a judge at the Old Bailey where he was arraigned for high treason by conspiring the death of the king. Fenwick entered a plea of not guilty and the court gave him notice to prepare for a trial.

William III then ordered the Duke of Devonshire to obtain a confession from Fenwick; the king also declined to consider granting a pardon until he had heard the nature of Fenwick's revelations. To save himself and stall for time, Fenwick offered to reveal all he knew about the Jacobite conspiracies; but his confession was a farce, being confined to charges of Jacobitism against some of the leading Whig noblemen. These accusations, which implicated both Godolphin and Marlborough, were damaging, but not conclusive. Fenwick maintained this approach when he was brought before the king to give evidence in November 1696; he declined to modify his former statement either by withdrawing his accusations or by revealing any information about his personal involvement. By this time his friends had succeeded in removing one of the two witnesses, and in these circumstances, it was thought that the charge of treason would fail if Fenwick was brought before a jury. The government, however, overcame this difficulty by introducing a bill of attainder in October; having put a motion to the Commons, the decision to proceed with a bill was approved by 179 votes to 61.

=== Attainder and execution ===
Attainder of Sir John Fenwick Act 1696
- Act of Parliament
- Parliament of England
- Long title: An Act to attaint Sir John Fenwick Baronett of High Treason.
- Citation: 8 & 9 Will. 3. c. 4
- Territorial extent: England and Wales

Dates
- Royal assent: 11 January 1697
- Commencement: 20 October 1696 (Note: Start of session.)
- Repealed: 16 June 1977
Other legislation
Repealed by	Statute Law (Repeals) Act 1977

Status: Repealed

Text of statute as originally enacted

A long and acrimonious debate then ensued in parliament. Among the Tories, especially, there was profound unease about proceedings that mimicked a trial but lacked any legal safeguards. At the first reading of the bill in the Commons, the majority to proceed was 92; by the time of the third reading on 25 November, the majority had reduced to 33. The controversial bill passed the Commons by 189 votes to 156, and then passed the Lords by 68 votes to 61, with members of both houses voting largely along party lines. Having been approved by both Houses of Parliament, the bill received royal assent on 11 January 1697 (Act 8 & 9 Will. 3. c. 4), finding Fenwick guilty of high treason, punishable by death. His wife, Lady Mary Fenwick, persevered in her attempts to save his life by petitioning both the king and the House of Lords, but her efforts were fruitless.

Fenwick was beheaded at Tower Hill on 28 January 1697, with the same formalities as were usually observed at the execution of a peer owing to Fenwick's close connection with several noble families. Having stated that the Church of England was "the best and purest of all churches", he was attended on the scaffold by a non-juring bishop, Dr Thomas White. Gilbert Burnet said that Fenwick "died very composed, in a much better temper than was to be expected, for his life had been very irregular". Fenwick left a sealed paper, in which he commented on the injustice of his condemnation and restated his loyalty to James II. He was buried at St Martin-in-the-Fields. Fenwick was the last person to be executed under an act of attainder in England.

== Personal life and reputation ==
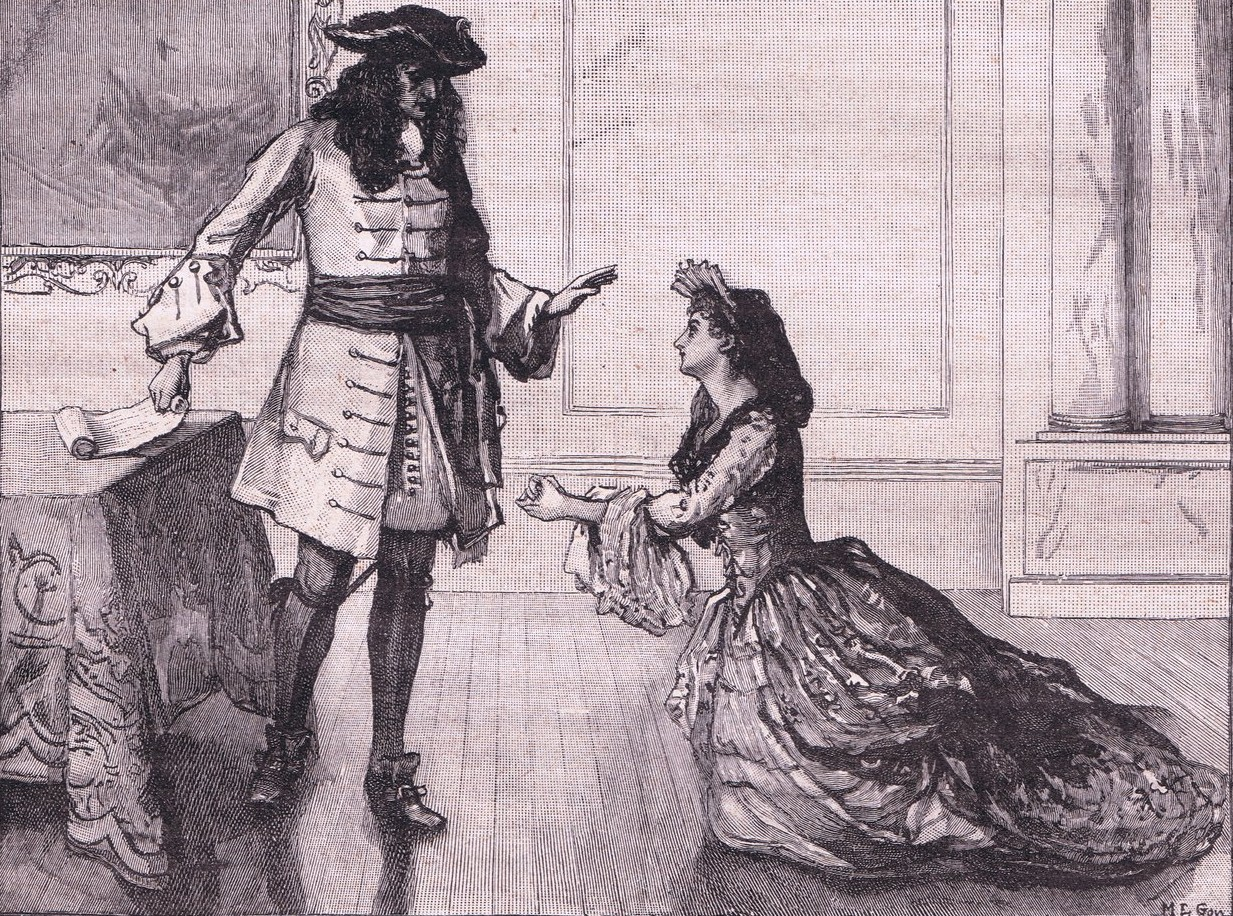
A depiction of Lady Mary Fenwick interceding for her husband following his arrest

By his wife, Mary (d. 1708), daughter of Charles Howard, 1st Earl of Carlisle and his wife Anne Howard, he had three sons and one daughter, all of whom died young, and are buried with Fenwick at St Martin-in-the-Fields. Following the act of attainder, what remained of Fenwick's property was granted to his nephew, Charles Howard, 3rd Earl of Carlisle.

Macaulay wrote that of all the Jacobites, the most desperate characters not excepted, he (Fenwick) was the only one for whom William felt an intense personal aversion. Fenwick's hatred of the king is said to date from the time when he was serving in Holland, and was reprimanded by William, then Prince of Orange. A horse, White Sorrel, owned by Fenwick, was among items of his estate confiscated by the Crown on his attainder and a fall from that horse was partly responsible for William's death. The horse purportedly stumbled when it stepped on a molehill. In recognition of this, the Jacobites' secret toast was to "The little Gentleman in Black Velvet." Fenwick is also commemorated in the folk tune Sir John Fenwick's The Flower Among Them All.

His wife had a memorial created for Fenwick, their children, and her father in York Minster, and she was buried there after she died on 27 October 1708.

== Bibliography ==
- "Northumbrian Jacobites". Archived from the original on 15 April 2004.
- "Proceedings in Parliament against Sir John Fenwick, bart. upon a bill of attainder for High Treason". A Complete Collection of State Trials and Proceedings for High Treason and Other Crimes and Misdemeanors. 13 (394, column 537). 1812.

Attribution:

Parliament of England
Preceded by Sir William Fenwick; Viscount Mansfield	Member of Parliament for Northumberland; 1677–1687; With: Sir Ralph Delaval 1677–1685; William Ogle 1685–1687	Succeeded by William Forster; Philip Bickerstaffe
Military offices
Preceded by The Earl of Plymouth	Colonel of Fenwick's Regiment of Horse; 1687–1688	Succeeded by Viscount Colchester
Baronetage of England
Preceded by William Fenwick	Baronet (of Fenwick); 1676–1697	Attainted
