= John Bennet, 1st Baron Ossulston =

English politician

John Bennet, 1st Baron Ossulston (1616 – 11 February 1695) was an English politician who sat in the House of Commons from 1663 to 1679. He was created Baron Ossulston in 1682.

== Life ==
Bennet was the eldest son of Sir John Bennet of Dawley, Harlington, Middlesex and his wife Dorothy Crofts. He was baptised on 5 July 1616. He matriculated at Pembroke College, Oxford on 24 April 1635, aged about 17 and was a student of Gray's Inn in 1636. In 1658, he succeeded his father to the estate of Dawley in Harlington. He was made a Knight of the Bath on 23 April 1661 at the coronation of Charles II and was Lieutenant of the Gentlemen Pensioners.

In 1663, Bennet was elected member of parliament for Wallingford in a by-election to the Cavalier Parliament. He owed a lot of his influence to his brother, Henry Bennet, 1st Earl of Arlington. In 1672, he gave a benefaction to Pembroke College. Oxford, to create scholarships for students from particular schools in Gloucestershire. He was created Lord Ossulston, Baron Ossulston on 24 November 1682. Ossulston is the name of a hundred of the ceremonial county of Middlesex. His wife, Bridget, was a noted book collector.

He supported the Glorious Revolution of 1688 and signed the petition for a free Parliament and the declaration to the Prince of Orange, but was reckoned among the opposition peers in 1690. In 1692, he donated 250 pounds to Pembroke College, Oxford.

Lord Ossulton died at the age of about 78 and was buried at Harlington. Richard Phillips painted a copy of his portrait in armour that had previously been painted by an unknown artist and presented it to Pembroke College in 1721.

== Family ==
Bennet was married twice, first to Elizabeth, widow of Edmund Sheffield, 2nd Earl of Mulgrave and daughter of Lionel Cranfield, 1st Earl of Middlesex and his wife Elizabeth Shepherd. They had no children. His second wife was Bridget Howe, daughter of John Grubham Howe of Langar and his wife Annabella Scrope, daughter of Emanuel Scrope, 1st Earl of Sunderland. They had two children Charles, who was given the title Earl of Tankerville and Annabella (1682–1698). Bridget was notable as a collector of books. Henry Bennet, 1st Earl of Arlington.

Parliament of England
Preceded by Robert Packer; Hon. George Fane	Member of Parliament for Wallingford; 1661; With: Robert Packer	Succeeded by John Stone; Scorey Barker
Peerage of England
New creation	Baron Ossulston; 1682–1695	Succeeded by Charles Bennet
