= Ralph Jenison =

British politician (1696–1758)

Ralph Jenison (c. December 1696 – 15 May 1758) of Elswick Hall near Newcastle, Northumberland and Walworth Castle, county Durham was a British politician who sat in the House of Commons between 1724 and 1758.

== Early life ==
Jenison was baptized at Heighington, County Durham, on 23 December 1696. From a family of Newcastle merchants, he was the eldest surviving son of Ralph Jenison of Elswick and Walworth, and his wife Elizabeth Heron (daughter of Sir Cuthbert Heron, 1st Baronet of Chipchase, Northumberland). He succeeded his father in 1704, and his grandfather Robert Jenison, in 1714.

Jenison was High Sheriff of Northumberland in 1716 and became a freeman of Newcastle upon Tyne in 1718. He was admitted at Christ's College, Cambridge in March 1719.

== Career ==
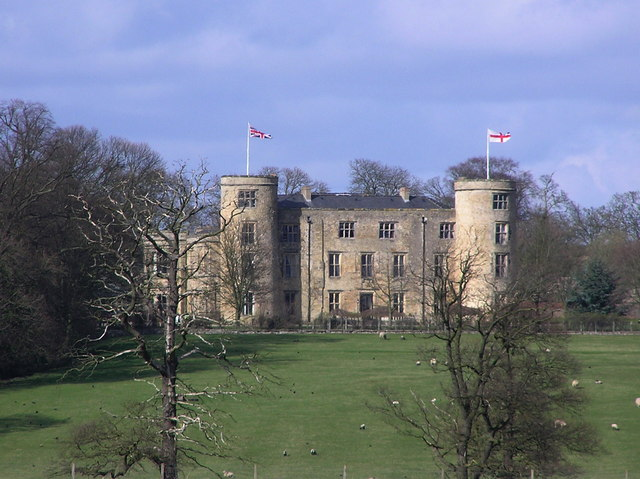
Walworth Castle

Jenison stood for parliament in a very expensive contest at a by-election at Northumberland on 20 February 1723. He was initially unsuccessful, but he petitioned and was seated as Member of Parliament on 16 April 1724. At the 1727 general election he was returned unopposed. He usually supported the Government, but voted for the repeal of the Septennial Act in 1734. He was re-elected MP for Northumberland in another expensive contest at the 1734 general election. He was politically connected with Charles Bennet, 2nd Earl of Tankerville and succeeded him as Master of the Buckhounds in 1737.

Jenison did not stand at the 1741 general election, probably for financial reasons. He had to sell Elswick Hall in 1742 and he gave up the mastership of the buckhounds in 1744. He received a pension of £1,200 as compensation but he recovered the post in 1746. He acted as agent to Lord Ossulston, Tankerville's son, at a by-election for Northumberland in February 1748 and this may have been rewarded by his return as MP for Newport (Isle of Wight) at a by-election on 20 June 1749, when Tankerville's brother-in-law, Lord Portsmouth, was governor of the island.

At the 1754 general election Jenison was returned unopposed for Newport but incurred high expenses which may have been paid from secret service money. In 1757 he lost his post of as Master of the Buckhounds again and was offered a secret service pension in compensation, which was finally settled at £1,800.

== Personal life ==
On 10 December 1751, Jenison married Susan Allan, daughter of Thomas Allan of the Flatts, county Durham.

He died on 15 May 1758 and was buried at Heighington. He left no issue as an only son predeceased him.

Parliament of Great Britain
Preceded by Sir William Middleton, Bt; William Wrightson	Member of Parliament for Northumberland; 1724 –1741; With: Sir William Middleton, Bt	Succeeded by Sir William Middleton, Bt; John Fenwick
Preceded by Captain Bluett Wallop; Thomas Lee Dummer	Member of Parliament for Newport (Isle of Wight); 1749–1758; With: Thomas Lee Dummer	Succeeded by Rear-Admiral Charles Holmes; Thomas Lee Dummer
