= William Ogle (Northumberland MP) =

English army officer and Tory politician

William Ogle (September 1653 – December 1718) was an English Army officer and Tory politician.

== Biography ==
Ogle was the only son of James Ogle of Causey Park and Jane, daughter and heiress of Lancelot Ogle of Burradon. Ogle served under his cousin, Lord Ogle, in the Third Anglo-Dutch War between 1673 and 1674. In 1675, he was appointed a justice of the peace for Northumberland and was active in the prosecution of English Dissenters. He was a captain of militia foot and a deputy lieutenant by 1680, and in 1685 became a common councilman in Berwick-upon-Tweed. In January that year, as a supporter of Ralph Widdrington, he persuaded the Berwick corporation to surrender its charter, for which he was rewarded with a commission in the Royal Dragoons.

In 1685, Ogle was returned unopposed to the Loyal Parliament as a Tory Member of Parliament for Northumberland alongside Sir John Fenwick, 3rd Baronet, having been identified as the preferred court candidate. Ogle sat on only one parliamentary committee, that for the reconstruction of St Paul's Cathedral. He gave loyal answers to the three questions on the repeal of the Test Acts 1673 & 1678 and penal laws in late 1687, and had been ordered to contest for the Northumberland seat at the next election accordingly; however, the Glorious Revolution ended Ogle's political career. He refused to take the Oaths of Allegiance and Supremacy Act 1688 and ended his days as a nonjuror. He was buried at Hebburn on 15 December 1718.

Parliament of England
Preceded by Sir John Fenwick, Bt; Sir Ralph Delaval	Member of Parliament for Northumberland; 1685–1687; With: Sir John Fenwick, Bt	Succeeded by William Forster; Philip Bickerstaffe
