= Robert Ogle (MP) =

Member of the Parliament of England

Sir Robert Ogle (c. 1370–1436) of Ogle, Northumberland was an English landowner, Member of Parliament and administrator.

He was born the eldest son of Sir Robert Ogle and his wife Joan, daughter and coheiress of Sir Alan Heton of Ingram.

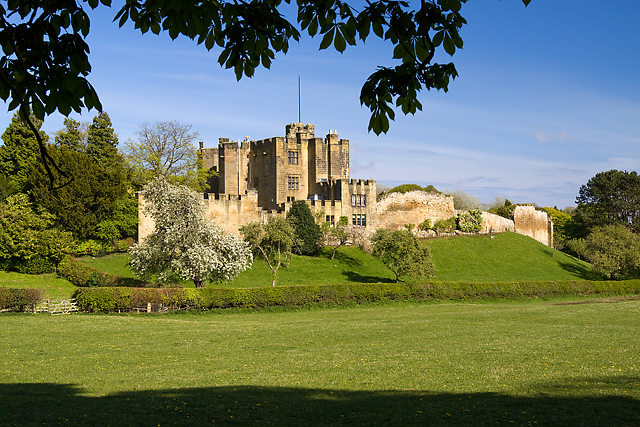
Bothal castle, Northumberland

His career began with his appointment for life in 1403 by Walter Skirlaw, Bishop of Durham to several offices (Constable of Norham castle, steward, sheriff, escheator and chief justice) in the bishop's liberty of Norhamshire and Islandshire. Knighted in 1410, he was sent by the king on a number of missions to Scotland as a diplomatic envoy.

He inherited a number of estates and properties from his father on the latter's death in 1409, but the one he coveted, Bothal Castle, had already gone to his younger brother. Robert, however, managed to obtain possession of it by a combination of force and cunning.

He was elected to Parliament as knight of the shire to represent Northumberland in March 1416, 1419, 1420, December 1421, 1425 and 1435 and was pricked High Sheriff of Northumberland for 1417–18.

He was appointed Constable of Wark Castle, Northumberland by 1419, of Berwick-upon-Tweed by 1423 to 1426, and Roxburgh by 1425 to his death in 1436.

He married 21 May 1399 Maud, the daughter of Sir Thomas Gray, with whom he had 3 sons and 4 daughters. He was succeeded by his eldest son Robert, who was created a baron.
