= Ralph Euer =

English knight and politician

Ralph Euer Ralph de Eure
- Arms of Lord Eure of Witton; Quarterly, or and gules, with a bend sable with three escallops argent
- Predecessor: John Euer
- Successor: William Eure
- Died: 12 March 1422
- Issue: Margaret; William; Ralph; John; Robert; Katherine; Isabel; Joan

Sir Ralph Euer, also known as Ralph de Eure, (c. 1350 – 12 March 1422) of Witton, Stokesley, Berwick Hill, Darreshall, Kirkley, Felton, Ayton, Malton and Boughton Spittle was an English knight and servant of the Crown and of the Bishops of Durham. He was also a member of parliament for Northumberland and Yorkshire.

== Life ==
Ralph was the second son of John Euer of Stokesley and Witton and Margaret de Grey. He became the heir to his father upon the death of his elder brother Robert in 1368 and was knighted by 1374.

Between 1380 and 1420 he undertook numerous commissions and enquiries on behalf of the Crown, at the same time serving as an ambassador to Scotland. He also acted as a justice of the peace within the Bishop of Durham's jurisdiction and as a steward of the Bishop's estates from 1406 until his own death. He fought in the wars with Scotland in 1383 and 1385.

He was High Sheriff of Northumberland for 1385-1390 and 1397–1399 and High Sheriff of Yorkshire for 1391–1392 and 1395–1396. He was elected to Parliament as a knight of the shire to represent Northumberland in 1380 and 1381 and Yorkshire in 1393, 1397 and 1399. He served as Lieutenant to John of Lancaster, 1st Duke of Bedford as Constable of England by 26 May 1411. Ralph died 12 March 1422, his son and heir William succeeded him.

== Marriage and issue ==
Ralph married firstly Isabel, the daughter of Aymer Atholl of Felton and Mary Felton, and had the following known issue:

- Margaret, married John Pudsey of Bolton.

He married secondly Katherine, daughter and co-heiress of William de Aton of Ayton and Malton and Isabel Percy, and had the following known issue:

- William, married Maud FitzHugh.
- Ralph
- John
- Robert, married Elizabeth Mallory.
- Katherine, married Alexander Neville of Thornton Bridge.
- Isabel, married firstly William Claxton of Claxton and secondly John Conyers of Ormesby.
- Joan, married Thomas Surtees of Dinsdale.
- Margaret, married Peter Buckton.

He married thirdly Maud Greystoke, the daughter of Ralph, Lord Greystoke; they had no known issue.
