= William Thomas Heron =

Former psychology professor at the University of Minnesota

- Born: January 3, 1897
- Died: July 18, 1988 (aged 91)
- Other names: W.T. Heron
- Education: University of Chicago
- Spouse: Joan Lenertz (m. 1955–1988)
- Scientific career
- Fields: Psychology
- Institutions: University of Minnesota
- Thesis: Individual differences in ability versus change in the learning of the stylus maze (1924)
- Doctoral advisor: Harvey A. Carr
- Doctoral students: Dwight Ingle; Kenneth MacCorquodale

William Thomas Heron (January 3, 1897 – July 18, 1988) was a professor of psychology at the University of Minnesota. He co-authored six papers with B.F. Skinner in the 1930s, making him Skinner's most frequent co-author during the latter's career. He is known for an experiment he conducted in 1952, in which he and a graduate student attempted to test the validity of extrasensory perception.
