= Frances Wolfreston =

English book collector

Frances Wolfreston (née Middlemore; 1607–1677) was an English book collector.

== Life ==
Frances was baptised on 13 September 1607 at King's Norton, Worcestershire. She was the daughter of George Middlemore and Frances née Stanford and was the eldest of twenty-two children.

She married Francis Wolfreston (1612-1666) on 29 September 1631. They had ten or eleven children, with three daughters and three sons surviving them.

Her husband died in November 1666 and after his death Frances moved to Tamworth. She died in January 1677 at Tamworth and is buried in Statfold.

== Book collecting ==
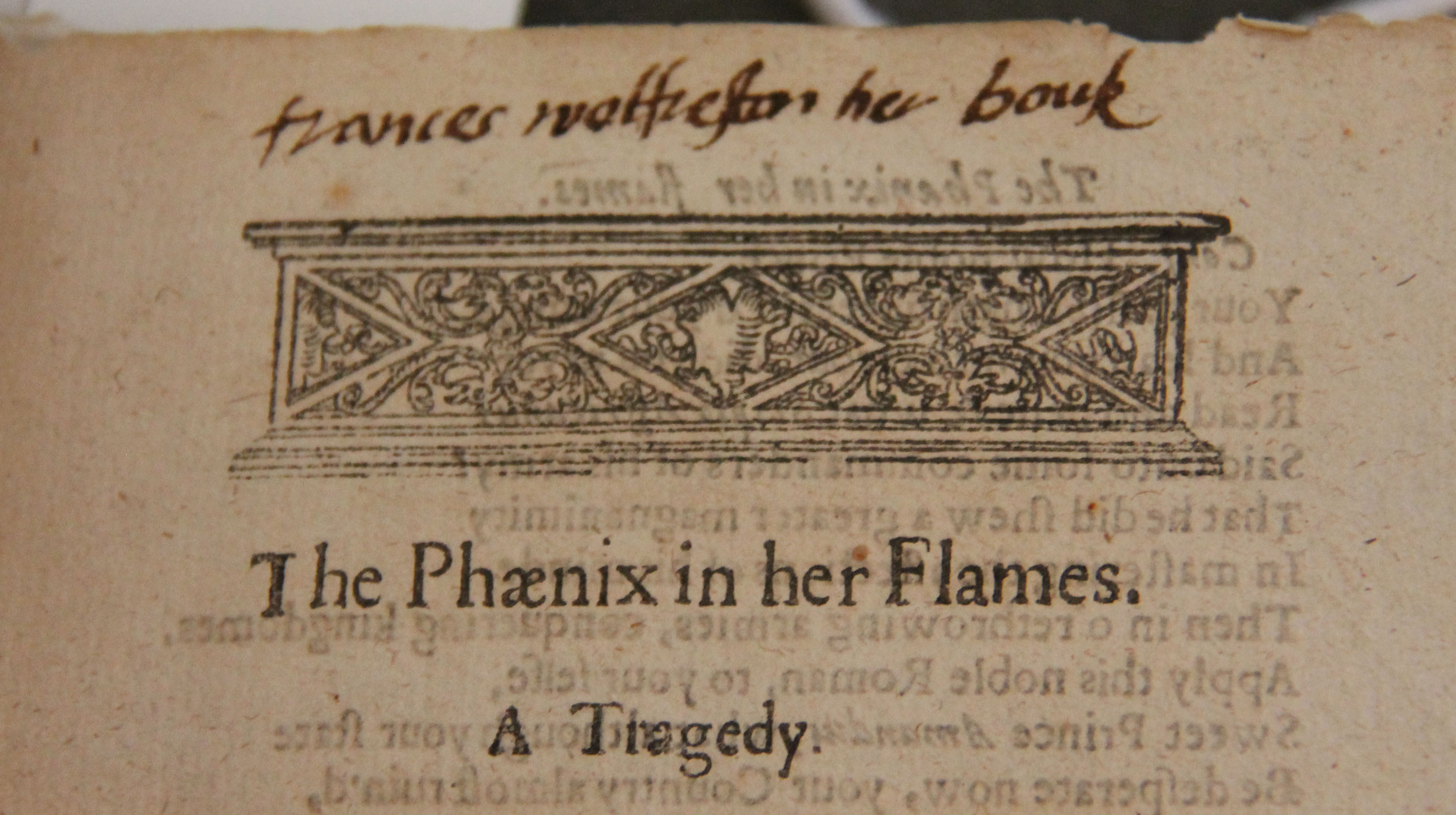
Inscription of Frances Wolfreston.Credit: University of Pennsylvania Rare Book & Manuscript Library.

She was mainly interested in English literature and drama, although she did own some theological and historical works, and is a rare example of a 17th century non-aristocratic woman who formed a substantial book collection. She typically inscribed the title pages of books with "frances wolfreston hor bouk".

She bequeathed her collection to her son Stanford (b. 1652). In her will she stated:

"And I give my son Stanford all my phisicke bookes, and all my godly bookes, and all the rest conditionally if any of his brothers or sisters would have them any tyme to read, and when they have done they shall returne them to their places againe, and he shall carefully keepe them together".

The majority of her books remained in family ownership until 1856 when most were sold at Sotheby's. A number of books were also sold in the late 1930s and in 1988. As a result, her books can be found in libraries in Britain, Europe and the United States. The Bodleian Libraries in Oxford contain some of her collection. This includes a unique copy of the 1593 edition of William Shakespeare's Venus and Adonis. There are books that show signs of other ownership as well as Frances, such as Dorothy Leigh's The mother's blessing (1622) which was previously owned by Humfrey Deverill in 1629, who was perhaps the swornman of Arnold, Nottinghamshire, as mentioned in a record from the Archdeaconry of Nottingham of 1587. In 2010 a bound collection of Poor Robin and Dale almanacks, which were annotated by Frances Wolfreston, were given by the Friends of the Bodleian. Other books of Frances' that are present in the Bodleian Library include:

- Certaine select prayers gathered out of S. Augustines meditations (London, 1575)
- Fletcher, (G), Licia, or Poems of Love (1593)
- Breton (N.), The Court and Country; or, A Briefe Discourse Betweene the Courtier and Countryman (1618).
- Dent (A.), A Sermon of Repentance (1660)
- Strafford, (T. Wentworth, Earl of), The Truest Relation of the Earle of Straffords Speech on the Scaffold . . . before he was beheaded, May 12. 1641 (1641)
- Taylor (J.), Taylors Goose, Describing the Wilde Goose (1621)

Previously, Paul Morgan placed the following book at the Bodleian Library, but it has since been traced to the National Library of Wales under shelf-mark OA 213.

- Werdmueller (O.), A Spiritual and Most Precious Perle (1555?)
