= William Wrightson (MP, born 1676) =

British landowner, official and Tory politician

William Wrightson (29 December 1676 – 1760), of Newcastle-upon-Tyne, was a British landowner, official and Tory politician who sat in the House of Commons between 1710 and 1724.

== Biography ==
Wrightson was the second son of Robert Wrightson of Cusworth, Yorkshire and his third wife Sarah Beaumont, daughter of Sir Thomas Beaumont of Whitley Beaumont, Yorkshire. His early life is obscure but in the early 1700s, he was appointed to Clerk at the Pipe Office, a minor government place worth only £10 a year. His prospects improved when he married Isabel Matthews widow of Thomas Matthews of Newcastle and daughter of Francis Beaumont, merchant, of Newcastle on 2 February 1699. She was the heiress of a significant estate in Newcastle.

Wrightson was returned as Tory Member of Parliament for Newcastle-upon-Tyne with Sir William Blackett, Bt at the 1710 British general election when they their wore hats emblazoned with the legend ‘for the Queen and Church’. He was interested in local affairs and on 20 February 1711 was nominated to draft a bill for the navigation of the Tyne. He was returned unopposed at the 1713 British general election.

Wrightson was returned at the 1715 British general election and voted against the Administration in every recorded division after George I's accession.. His first wife died in 1716 and in 1722 he married as his second wife Isabella Fenwick, daughter of William Fenwick of Bywell, Northumberland. At the 1722, he was defeated at Newcastle. His wife had considerable estates in Northumberland and he was returned as MP for Northumberland at a by-election on 20 February 1723. However, he was unseated on petition on 15 April 1724. He did not stand for Parliament again.

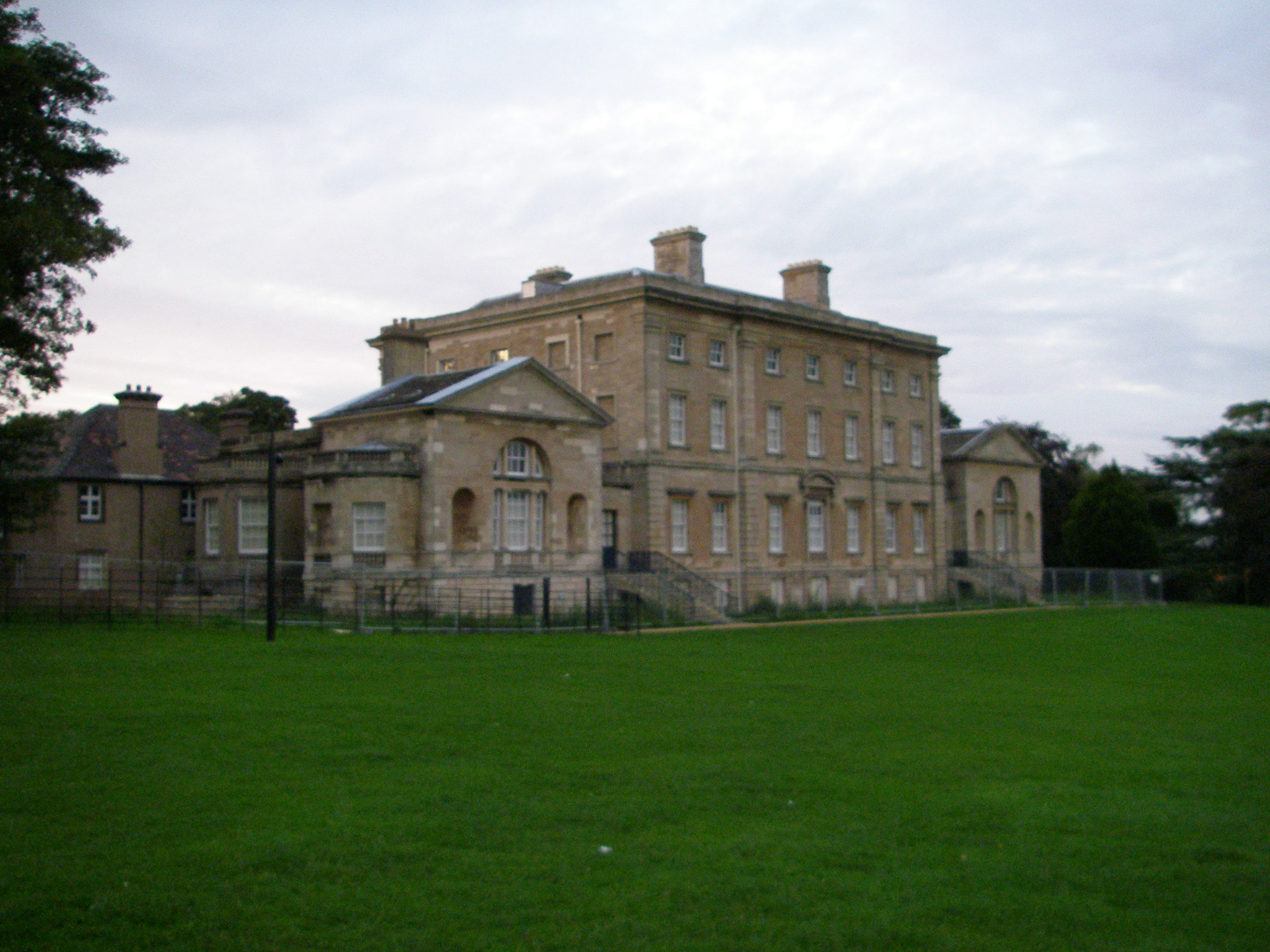
A photograph of Cusworth Hall

Wrightson succeeded his brother to Cusworth in 1724. He commissioned Cusworth Hall built by George Platt between 1740 and 1745 to replace a previous house. The house was further altered between 1749 and 1753 by James Paine.

Wrightson died on 4 December 1760, aged 84. A son and a daughter predeceased him and he left one surviving daughter, Isabella, who succeeded to Cusworth Hall. She married John Battie, who took the additional name of Wrightson in 1766 and was the mother of another MP William Wrightson.

Parliament of Great Britain
Preceded by Sir Henry Liddell, Bt; William Carr (1)	Member of Parliament for Newcastle-upon-Tyne; 1710–1722; With: Sir William Blackett, Bt (3)	Succeeded by Sir William Blackett, Bt (3); William Carr (2)
Preceded by Sir William Middleton, Bt; Earl of Hertford	Member of Parliament for Northumberland; 1723–1724; With: Sir William Middleton, Bt	Succeeded by Sir William Middleton, Bt; Ralph Jenison
