= Farnacres =

English settlement

Farnacres is a locality in Tyne and Wear, in north-east England.

Robert de Umfraville in 1428 was granted a license to use his manor of Farnacres, for a chantry chapel. The chapel, Umfraville charged, should be devoted to the souls of himself, his wife Isabella, Kings Henry IV and V, and to each past, present and future member of the Order of the Garter.

The chantry was dedicated to St John the Baptist and St John the Evangelist and was dissolved in 1548.
