= Sir William Fenwick, 2nd Baronet =

English landowner and politician

Sir William Fenwick, 2nd Baronet (c. 1617 – 9 July 1676) was an English landowner and politician who sat in the House of Commons at various times between 1645 and 1676.

== Biography ==
Fenwick was the eldest surviving son of Sir John Fenwick, 1st Baronet of Wallington Hall, Northumberland and his second wife Grace Loraine and was educated at Morpeth Grammar School and Christ's College, Cambridge, before entering Gray's Inn.

He was appointed a deputy lieutenant for Northumberland in 1644. He became a Member of Parliament for Northumberland in a recruiter election in 1645. He abstained from attending the Commons after Pride's Purge in December 1648, but regained his public offices under the Commonwealth of England from 1649/50. He was appointed a justice of the peace for his county in 1650, and represented Northumberland in the First, Second and Third Protectorate parliaments. He succeeded to his father's estates and baronetcy circa 1658, his elder half-brother John having been killed at Marston Moor in 1644. After the Stuart Restoration, he was elected to the Convention Parliament and the Cavalier Parliament. In 1674, he was made a justice of the peace for Cumbria.

He married Jane, the daughter of Henry Stapilton of Wighill, Yorkshire; they had a son and two daughters. He was succeeded by his son, Sir John Fenwick, 3rd Baronet.

Baronetage of England
| Preceded by John Fenwick | Baronet (of Fenwick) c. 1658–1676 | Succeeded by John Fenwick |
