= Robert Clavering (MP) =

Member of the Parliament of England

Robert Clavering was an MP for Northumberland from 1386 to 1388.

Clavering was born in Newcastle-upon-Tyne on 3 February 1326. He was the Collector of taxes for Northumberland from 1379 to 1383. He was also the Chancellor, Chamberlain, Clerk of the Works, and Keeper of Provisions at Berwick-upon-Tweed from 1386 to 1388. He died on 17 January 1394.
