= Northumberland (constituency) =

Parliamentary constituency in the United Kingdom, 1801–1832

- Former county constituency for the House of Commons

1290–1832
- Seats: two
- Replaced by: North Northumberland, South Northumberland and Tynemouth and North Shields

Northumberland, was a county constituency of the House of Commons of the Parliament of England from 1290 to 1707, then of the Parliament of Great Britain from 1707 to 1800 and of the Parliament of the United Kingdom from 1801 to 1832. It was represented by two Members of Parliament.

The constituency was split into two two-member divisions, for Parliamentary purposes, by the Reform Act 1832. The county was then represented by the North Numberland and South Northumberland constituencies.

== Members of Parliament ==
=== MPs 1290–1640 ===
Parliament	First member	Second member
1300	Sir Luke Tailboys	
1311	Guischard de Charron	
1311	Roger Mauduit	
1314	Roger Mauduit	
1331	Roger Mauduit	
1334	Roger Mauduit	
1371	William Heron	
1372	Thomas Surteys	John de Mitford
1373	Sir Bertram (II) Montbourcher	
1377	Sir Bertram (II) Montbourcher	
1378	Sir John Fenwick	
1379	Sir John Heron	
1380	Walter de Swinhoe	Sir Ralph Euer
1381	Adam de Athol (Sir Aymer de Strathbogie of Felton)	Sir Ralph Euer
1382	Sir Robert Clifford	
1386	Sir Bertram Montbourcher	Sir Robert Clavering
1388 (Feb)	Sir Thomas Umfraville	John de Mitford
1388 (Sep)	John de Mitford	
1390 (Jan)	Sir Thomas Umfraville	John de Mitford
1390 (Nov)	Sir John Felton	John de Mitford
1391	Sir Gerard Heron	John de Mitford
1393	Sir Gerard Heron	John de Mitford
1394	Sir Gerard Heron	John de Mitford
1395	Sir William Swinburne	Sampson Hardyng
1397 (Jan)	Sir Thomas Gray	John de Mitford
1397 (Sep)	Sir Gerard Heron	Sir Robert Lisle
1399	Sir Thomas Gray	Sampson Hardyng
1401	Sir Gerard Heron	John de Mitford
1402	Sir Gerard Heron	John de Mitford
1404 (Jan)	Sir John Widdrington	Sampson Hardyng
1404 (Oct)	Sir William Carnaby	Sir Robert Lisle
1406	Sir John Clavering	Sir Robert Lisle
1407	Sir Edmund Hastings	Robert Harbottle
1410		
1411		
1413 (Feb)		
1413 (May)	John Bertram	William Mitford
1414 (Apr)	Sir John Middleton	Sir Robert Lisle
1414 (Nov)	Sir John Widdrington	Sampson Hardyng
1415		
1416 (Mar)	Sir Robert Ogle	William Mitford
1416 (Oct)		
1417	Sir John Middleton	Sir Robert Lisle
1417	John Strother	
1419	Sir Robert Ogle	William Mitford
1420	Sir Robert Ogle	Nicholas Turpin
1421 (May)	John Manners	Sampson Hardyng
1421 (Dec)	Sir Robert Ogle	William Mitford
1425	Sir Robert Ogle	
1434	Thomas Lilborn	John Cartyngton
1435	Sir Robert Ogle	
1451	Sir John Ogle	William Bertram
1491	Sir William Tyler	
1510–1523	No Names Known	
1529	Cuthbert Radcliffe	Robert Collingwood
1536		
1539		
1542		
1545		
1547	Sir Thomas Hilton	John Bednall
1553 (Mar)		
1553 (Oct)	Sir Thomas Grey	Cuthbert Horsley
1554 (Apr)	John Swinburne	Robert Horsley
1554 (Nov)	Sir Thomas Grey	Cuthbert Horsley
1555	Sir Thomas Wharton	George Heron
1558	Sir Thomas Wharton	Sir Robert Ellerker
1558–1589	Sir Thomas Grey I	Cuthbert Horsley
1562–1565	John Vaughan	Robert Lawdon (died 1665)
1571	Sir Henry Percy	Sir William Hilton
1572 (Apr)	Sir Francis Russell	Thomas Layton
1584	Sir Francis Russell	Edward Talbot
1586	Sir Thomas Grey II	Edward Talbot
1588 (Oct)	William Carey	Robert Widdrington
1593	Sir William Reade alias Kynnerd	Robert Widdrington
1597	Sir Robert Carey	William Selby
1601 (Oct)	Sir Robert Carey	William Selby
1604–1611	Sir Ralph Grey	Sir Henry Widdrington
1614	Sir Henry Widdrington	Sir George Selby, declared inelig. and repl. by Sir William Selby
1621–1622	Sir William Grey	Sir Henry Widdrington
1624	Sir John Fenwick	Sir Francis Brandling
1625	Sir John Fenwick	Sir Francis Brandling
1626	Sir John Fenwick	Sir John Delaval
1628	Sir John Fenwick	Sir William Carnaby
1629–1640	No Parliaments convened	

=== MPs 1640–1832 ===
Year	First member	First party	Second member	Second party
April 1640	Sir John Fenwick		Sir William Widdrington	Royalist
November 1640	Henry Percy	Royalist	Sir William Widdrington	Royalist
1642	Sir John Fenwick	Parliamentarian	Sir William Widdrington	Royalist
August 1642	Sir John Fenwick	Parliamentarian	Widdrington disabled from sitting – seat vacant	
1645	Sir John Fenwick	Parliamentarian	William Fenwick	
December 1648	Both Fenwicks excluded in Pride's Purge – seats vacant			
1653	Not separately represented in Barebone's Parliament			
Northumberland's representation was increased to three members in the First and Second Parliaments of the Protectorate
1654	William Fenwick, Robert Fenwick, Henry Ogle			
1656	William Fenwick, Robert Fenwick, Sir Thomas Widdrington			
Representation reverted to two members in the Third Protectorate Parliament
January 1659	Sir William Fenwick		(Sir) Ralph Delaval	
May 1659	Not represented in the restored Rump			
April 1660	Sir William Fenwick		(Sir) Ralph Delaval	
1661	Sir William Fenwick		Viscount Mansfield	
1677	Sir John Fenwick	Tory	Sir Ralph Delaval	
1685	Sir John Fenwick	Tory	William Ogle	Tory
1689	William Forster	Tory	Philip Bickerstaffe	Tory
1698	William Forster	Tory	Sir Edward Blackett	
January 1701	Ferdinando Forster	Whig	Hon. William Howard	Whig
December 1701	Sir Francis Blake	Whig	William Loraine	
1702	Sir Francis Blake	Whig	Bertram Stote	
1705	Thomas Forster	Tory	Sir John Delaval	Whig
1708	Thomas Forster, junior	Tory	Earl of Hertford	
1716	Francis Blake Delaval		Earl of Hertford	
1722	Sir William Middleton, Bt	Whig	Earl of Hertford	
1723	Sir William Middleton, Bt	Whig	William Wrightson	Tory
1724	Sir William Middleton, Bt	Whig	Ralph Jenison	
1741	Sir William Middleton, Bt	Whig	John Fenwick	Tory
1748	Sir William Middleton, Bt	Whig	Lord Ossulston	
1749	Sir William Middleton, Bt	Whig	Lancelot Allgood	
1754	Sir William Middleton, Bt	Whig	Sir Henry Grey	
1757	George Shafto Delaval		Sir Henry Grey	
1768	George Shafto Delaval		Sir Edward Blackett	
1774	Lord Algernon Percy		Sir William Middleton, Bt	
1786	Hon. Charles Grey		Sir William Middleton, Bt	
1795	Hon. Charles Grey		Thomas Richard Beaumont	Tory
1807	Earl Percy		Thomas Richard Beaumont	Tory
1812	Sir Charles Monck		Thomas Richard Beaumont	Tory
1818	Sir Charles Monck		Thomas Wentworth Beaumont	Tory
1820	Charles John Brandling		Thomas Wentworth Beaumont	Tory
February 1826	Matthew Bell	Tory	Thomas Wentworth Beaumont	Tory
July 1826	Matthew Bell	Tory	Hon. Henry Liddell	Tory
1830	Matthew Bell	Tory	Thomas Wentworth Beaumont	Whig
1831	Henry Grey	Whig	Thomas Wentworth Beaumont	Whig
1832	Constituency abolished – see North Northumberland and South Northumberland			

== Elections ==
The county franchise, from 1430, was held by the adult male owners of freehold land valued at 40 shillings or more. Each elector had as many votes as there were seats to be filled. Votes had to be cast by a spoken declaration, in public, at the hustings, which took place in the town of Alnwick. The expense and difficulty of voting at only one location in the county, together with the lack of a secret ballot contributed to the corruption and intimidation of electors, which was widespread in the unreformed British political system.

The expense, to candidates, of contested elections encouraged the leading families of the county to agree on the candidates to be returned unopposed whenever possible. Contested county elections were therefore unusual. The Tory Percys, led by the Duke of Northumberland, shared the county representation with the Whig Grey Family.

== See also ==
- History of parliamentary constituencies and boundaries in Northumberland
- List of former United Kingdom Parliament constituencies
- Unreformed House of Commons

== Sources ==
- Robert Beatson, A Chronological Register of Both Houses of Parliament (London: Longman, Hurst, Res & Orme, 1807)
- D Brunton & D H Pennington, Members of the Long Parliament (London: George Allen & Unwin, 1954)
- Cobbett's Parliamentary history of England, from the Norman Conquest in 1066 to the year 1803 (London: Thomas Hansard, 1808)
- Leigh Rayment's Historical List of MPs – Constituencies beginning with "N" (part 3)
