= William Heron (died 1428) =

14th-15th century English noble

William Heron (died 20 January 1428), Lord of Ford, was an English noble. He died in 1428 in a feud with the Manners family attacking their castle of Etal in Northumberland, England.

== Life ==
William was the son of John Heron of Ford. On 20 January 1428 there was a fight between William and John Manners outside Etal Castle, in which William was killed. The precise events are unclear and formed the basis of a subsequent lawsuit, but John argued that William had assaulted the castle, during which attack he had died, and that John had no direct involvement in his death. William's widow blamed John and his eldest son, also called John, for William's death and demanded compensation. After arbitration by the Church, eventually John agreed to pay for 500 masses for William's soul, and to give 250 marks to his widow.

== Marriage and issue ==
William married Isabel, daughter of Richard Scott, they are known to have had the following issue:

- William Heron (died 1 September 1425)
- John Heron (died 29 March 1461)
