= William Widdrington =

William Widdrington may refer to:

- William Widdrington, 1st Baron Widdrington (1610–1651), English politician and soldier
- William Widdrington, 2nd Baron Widdrington (died 1675)
- William Widdrington, 3rd Baron Widdrington (1656–1695)
- William Widdrington, 4th Baron Widdrington (1678–1743), English peer and supporter of the Stuart claim to the English Crown

== See also ==
- Baron Widdrington
