= Widdrington =

Widdrington may refer to:

Places

- Widdrington, Northumberland, place in Northumberland, England
- Widdrington railway station, railway station in Northumberland, England
- Widdrington Station and Stobswood, place in Northumberland, England

People

- Widdrington family, Barons and Baronets
- Widdrington (name), surname (another disambiguation page)
