= Ralph Widdrington =

Ralph Widdrington may refer to:

- Ralph Widdrington (academic) (died 1688), Regius Professor of Greek at Cambridge University
- Ralph Widdrington (politician) (c. 1640–1718), Member of Parliament for Berwick upon Tweed, 1685–1689
