= Widdrington Castle =

Castle in Widdrington Village, Northumberland, England

- Northumberland, England, UK

Location
- Location in Northumberland
- Coordinates: 55.254°N 1.599°W
- Grid reference: NZ255956

Widdrington Castle is a Scheduled Ancient Monument and the site of a former medieval tower house and castle at Widdrington, Northumberland, England of which only earthworks now remain. The location is within a mile or so of the North Sea.

The property was owned by the Widdrington family from the 12th century. In 1341 Gerard Widdrington was granted a licence to crenellate the house, which was later rebuilt in the early 17th century as a manor house. Engravings show a substantial tower with bartizans (projecting turrets) at the corners, similar to the surviving structure at nearby Belsay Castle.

The Scottish lord Claud Hamilton was an exile at the castle in 1583. At the Union of the Crowns, James VI and I came to Widdrington on 8 April 1603. He knighted Henry Widdrington. Anne of Denmark and her children stayed in the castle on their way to London on 7 June 1603.

William Widdrington married the heiress of Blankney Hall, Lincolnshire in 1643 and the castle ceased to be the main family residence.

The estates of a later William Widdrington were sequestrated, and sold by the Crown, as a result of his attainder for treason for his part in the Jacobite rising of 1715. The castle was reported to be in a ruinous condition in 1720.

New owners began a rebuild in 1772 but the structure was destroyed by fire. A second attempt at reconstruction was more successful but the new Gothic-style castle was demolished in 1862.
