= Widdrington (name) =

Widdrington is a surname, and may refer to:

- The various barons Widdrington, including:
  - William Widdrington, 1st Baron Widdrington (1610 – 1651)
  - His great-grandson William Widdrington, 4th Baron Widdrington (1678 – 1743)
  - The 1st Baron's relative Sir Thomas Widdrington, and Thomas's brother Ralph
- Tommy Widdrington (born 1971), English-born footballer who played for Southampton and Port Vale
  - His son Kai Widdrington (born 1995), dancer
  - His son Theo Widdrington (born 1999), footballer
- Samuel Edward Cook (writer), took the name of Widdrington, his mother being the heiress of some of the estates of this family

== Pseudonyms ==
- Thomas Preston (Benedictine monk), adopted the pen-name of Roger Widdrington
