= Widdrington Village =

Civil parish in Northumberland, England

Coordinates: 55.25682°N 1.60018°W

Widdrington
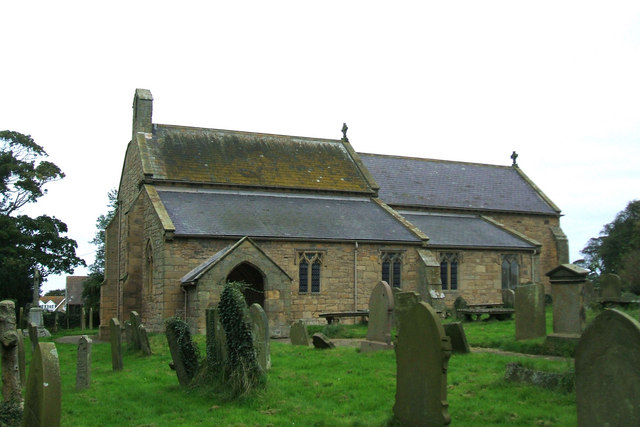

- Location within Northumberland
- Population: 167 (2011 census)
- Civil parish: Widdrington Village
- Unitary authority: Northumberland
- Ceremonial county: Northumberland
- Region: North East
- Country: England
- Sovereign state: United Kingdom
- UK Parliament: North Northumberland

Widdrington is a village and (as Widdrington Village) a civil parish in the county of Northumberland, England. It borders Tritlington and West Chevington and East Chevington parishes to the north, the North Sea to the east, Cresswell and Ellington and Linton parishes to the south, and Widdrington Station and Stobswood parish to the west. In 2011 the parish has a population of 167.

== History ==
The area was the seat of the Widdrington family. In 1642, William Widdrington raised forces in support of Charles I, who elevated him to the new title of Baron Widdrington. After the defeat of the Royalist forces in the North, he fled and his estates were confiscated by Parliament. He returned in support of Charles II, but was slain at the Battle of Wigan Lane. William Widdrington, 4th Baron Widdrington, was convicted of high treason for his part in the Jacobite rising of 1715, his title forfeited, and his estates broken up and sold.

On 19 December 2003 the parish was renamed from "Widdrington" to "Widdrington Village".

=== Widdrington Castle ===
The medieval tower house, Widdrington Castle, was described by John Leland, sited south of a brook about "half a mile" from the sea, with a view of Coquet Island. The site, within the present village, is 1.5 miles from the sea. Gerard Widdrington obtained a licence to crenellate, to build a castle, in 1341. It fell into ruin after a fire 1777, and was demolished by Sir George Warren, finally being demolished in 1862. James VI and I stayed at the castle on 8 April 1603 as a guest of Sir Robert Carey and his wife Elizabeth Trevanion.

== Landmarks ==
The Grade I listed parish church dates to the 12th century. There are ruins of a medieval castle, Widdrington Castle, a scheduled monument.

In the grounds of the parish church sits the War Memorial Cross, on which is the inscription: "SACRED TO THE MEMORY OF THE MEN FROM THIS DISTRICT WHO FELL IN THE GREAT WAR 1914-1919"

== Notable people ==
- Anne Hepple Dickinson (1877–1959), writer
- James Bulmer Johnson (1889–1943), First World War British Army officer and recipient of the Victoria Cross
- Bob Morton (1906–1990), English footballer

== See also ==
- Woodhorn
- Druridge Bay
- Ulgham
