= Listed buildings in Bewcastle =

Bewcastle is a civil parish in the Cumberland district of Cumbria, England. It contains 20 listed buildings that are recorded in the National Heritage List for England. Of these, one is listed at Grade II*, the middle of the three grades, and the others are at Grade II, the lowest grade. The parish is almost entirely rural or forested. It extends to the Scottish border, and four of the listed buildings originated as bastle houses (fortified farmhouses). Most of the other listed buildings are houses, farmhouses and farm buildings, the others including a church, a former public house, and a monument.

== Key ==
Grade	Criteria
II*	Particularly important buildings of more than special interest
II	Buildings of national importance and special interest

== Buildings ==
Name and location	Photograph	Date	Notes	Grade
St Cuthbert's Church; 55.06360°N 2.68197°W		13th century	The tower dates from 1792, and the south side of the church was altered in 1901. It is built in calciferous sandstone, with quoins, the tower is partly rendered, and the roof is of green slate. The church consists of a single cell, with a short tower incorporating a porch at the west end. The tower has two storeys, a doorway and windows with round arches that have impost blocks and keystones. At the top is an open bellcote and a hipped roof with a weathervane. The windows in the body of the church are lancets, and inside the church is a west gallery.	II*
Crew Castle; 55.09340°N 2.67768°W	—	16th century (probable)	Originally a bastle house, now in ruins and used as a sheep pen. It is in calciferous sandstone on projecting plinth stones, and has large quoins. The walls are over 1.5 metres (4 ft 11 in) thick and rise only to the ground floor level. The south entrance has large jamb stones, and the north entrance is blocked. It is also a scheduled monument.	II
Peel 0' Hill; 55.07022°N 2.69221°W	—	Late 16th century (probable)	Originally a bastle house and later a farmhouse, it was expanded in 1811. The house is in rubble on projecting plinth stones, and it has a Welsh slate roof. There are two storeys and three bays, a lower two-storey two-bay extension to the right, and a single-storey outbuilding to the left. The original part has very thick walls. The windows in the ground floor are casements and a fire window, and in the upper floor they are sashes.	II
Ruins of The Loan; 55.09903°N 2.68935°W	—	Late 16th century (probable)	The ruins of a bastle house, in calciferous sandstone on a projecting plinth, and with large quoins. The entrance has chamfered and rebated jambs and a lintel, and there is a slit vent. It is also a scheduled monument.	II
Wall, Low Grains; 55.06852°N 2.66494°W	—	Late 16th to early 17th century (probable)	The wall incorporates the remains of a bastle house and a 17th-century farmhouse. It is in calciferous sandstone with very thick walls, and has foundations measuring about 5 metres (16 ft) by 9 metres (30 ft). The entrance has rounded jambs and a lintel. The adjoining wall contains the blocked windows of the former farmhouse. It is also a scheduled monument.	II
Sleetbeck; 55.07755°N 2.78688°W	—	Late 17th century	The house was altered in 1744. It is in calciferous sandstone on a squared plinth, with quoins and it has a green slate roof with coped gables. There are two storeys with attics, and seven bays. The doorway has a moulded architrave with a dentilled moulded pediment, above which is a carved coat of arms. The windows are sashes, and the attic windows have chamfered surrounds and have retained their chamfered mullions.	II
Demesne Farmhouse; 55.06440°N 2.68267°W		Late 17th to early 18th century	The farmhouse was altered in the 19th century. It is in sandstone, some taken from Bewcastle Castle, and it has a Welsh slate roof. There are two storeys and two bays, with a two-bay extension. The doorway has a quoined surround, and the sash windows have plain surrounds. There are also blocked mullioned windows and fire windows.	II
Former Horse and Farrier Inn; 55.07746°N 2.76348°W	—	Late 17th to early 18th century	Originally a public house, later a private house, it is in sandstone with a corrugated iron roof. It has a single storey and three bays, and a 19th-century single-bay extension to the right. The doorway has a plain surround, and at the rear are sash windows. Inside there are two original full crucks.	II
Low Grains; 55.06879°N 2.66528°W	—	Late 17th to early 18th century	Originally a farmhouse and barn, altered in 1754, and later used as farm buildings. They are in calciferous sandstone with roofs in Welsh slate and corrugated iron. The former house has one storey and four bays, and the barn, at right angles, has two storeys. The former house has a doorway with a quoined surround, and windows with the mullions removed and chamfered surrounds. In the barn are a cart entrance and ventilation slits.	II
Whintingstown; 55.07517°N 2.75082°W	—	1701	A sandstone farmhouse on a projecting plinth with a roof of corrugated iron. It is in a single storey and has four bays. The doorway has a quoined surround with a dated and inscribed lintel, and there is a similar, blocked entrance to the left. The windows are a mix of sashes and casements. Inside there are five upper crucks in the roof space.	II
The Ash; 55.08030°N 2.76835°W	—	1738	A farmhouse that incorporates earlier features, it is in calciferous sandstone on a chamfered plinth, with quoins, a string course, a cornice, and a Welsh slate roof with coped gables. There is a rear extension in brick and stone. There are two storeys and five bays, and an extension giving a T-shaped plan. The doorway has a moulded architrave, a segmental moulded pediment, and a fanlight. The windows are sashes in moulded architraves.	II
Town Foot; 55.09785°N 2.69178°W	—	1763	A farmhouse and barn in rubble with a Welsh slate roof. They are in a single storey, the house having three bays, and the barn to the right. The entrance has a chamfered stone surround and a dated lintel, the windows are sashes, and there is a fire window at the rear. In the barn is an entrance, and ventilation slits at two levels.	II
Outbuildings, Sleetbeck; 55.07770°N 2.78702°W	—	Late 18th century (probable)	The outbuildings are in calciferous sandstone with a Welsh slate roof. They are in one storey with a loft, and have an L-shaped plan. The openings include doorways, windows, and a loft door.	II
The Flatt and outbuildings 55.10106°N 2.69109°W	—	1781	The farmhouse was extended in the 19th century. It is in ashlar on a chamfered plinth, with quoins, a shaped cornice, and a green slate roof with coped gables. There are two storeys, the original part has three bays, the extension to the right has two bays, and there is a lean-to single-bay extension to the left. The doorway has a moulded architrave with a pulvinated frieze and a triangular moulded pediment, and the windows are sashes. At the rear is a tall round-headed stair window. The outbuildings at the rear form an L-shaped plan, they are in rubble, and have roofs of green and Welsh slate. They have two storeys, and the openings include a projecting cart entrance, garage doors, plank doors, and ventilation slits.	II
Lordstown; 55.11380°N 2.76436°W	—	Early 19th century	A farmhouse in calciferous sandstone with quoins, eaves modillions, and a Welsh slate roof. It has two storeys and three bays, with a single-storey single-bay extension to the right. The door has a fanlight with a quoined surround, and the windows are sashes in plain raise surrounds.	II
Round house, Roanstrees; 55.09621°N 2.75608°W		Early 19th century	A small circular building with a steep conical roof, whose original purpose was unknown; it was possibly a flax drying shed. It is built in rubble with a roof of sandstone slabs. There is a plank door in a quoined surround, and casement windows were added later.	II
Barn, Roanstrees; 55.09615°N 2.75594°W	—	1832	The barn is in sandstone with a Welsh slate roof. It is in a single storey, and has a large cart entrance with a segmental arch and a dated keystone, and ventilation slits in two levels.	II
Banna; 55.06328°N 2.68194°W	—	1837	Originally a rectory, it is in sandstone on a squared plinth, with quoins and a slate roof. There are two storeys and three bays flanked by two-storey single-bay wings. The doorway has a quoined surround and an entablature with a keystone, and the windows are sashes, some with hood moulds.	II
Davidson's Monument; 55.15122°N 2.73212°W		1852	The monument commemorates Thomas Davidson, a game watcher who was killed by poachers in 1848. It is in calciferous sandstone, and consists of a rusticated plinth, a square shaft with an inscription, and a pyramidal cap.	II
Bewcastle War Memorial; 55.06362°N 2.68217°W		1919	The memorial is in the churchyard of St Cuthbert's Church. It is in granite, and consists of a single-step base, a tapering foot, a plinth with a cornice, and an obelisk. On the east face of the plinth is an inscription and a Latin cross, and on the other sides are the names of those lost in the two World Wars.	II
Knowe URC War Memorial	—	1919	The memorial is in the churchyard of The Knowe United Reformed Church, near Blackpool Gate. It is a stone obelisk with a sword and scabbard in relief on its front face. The memorial is inscribed with the names of those lost in the First World War.	II
