= Widdrington baronets =

Extinct baronetcy in the Baronetage of England

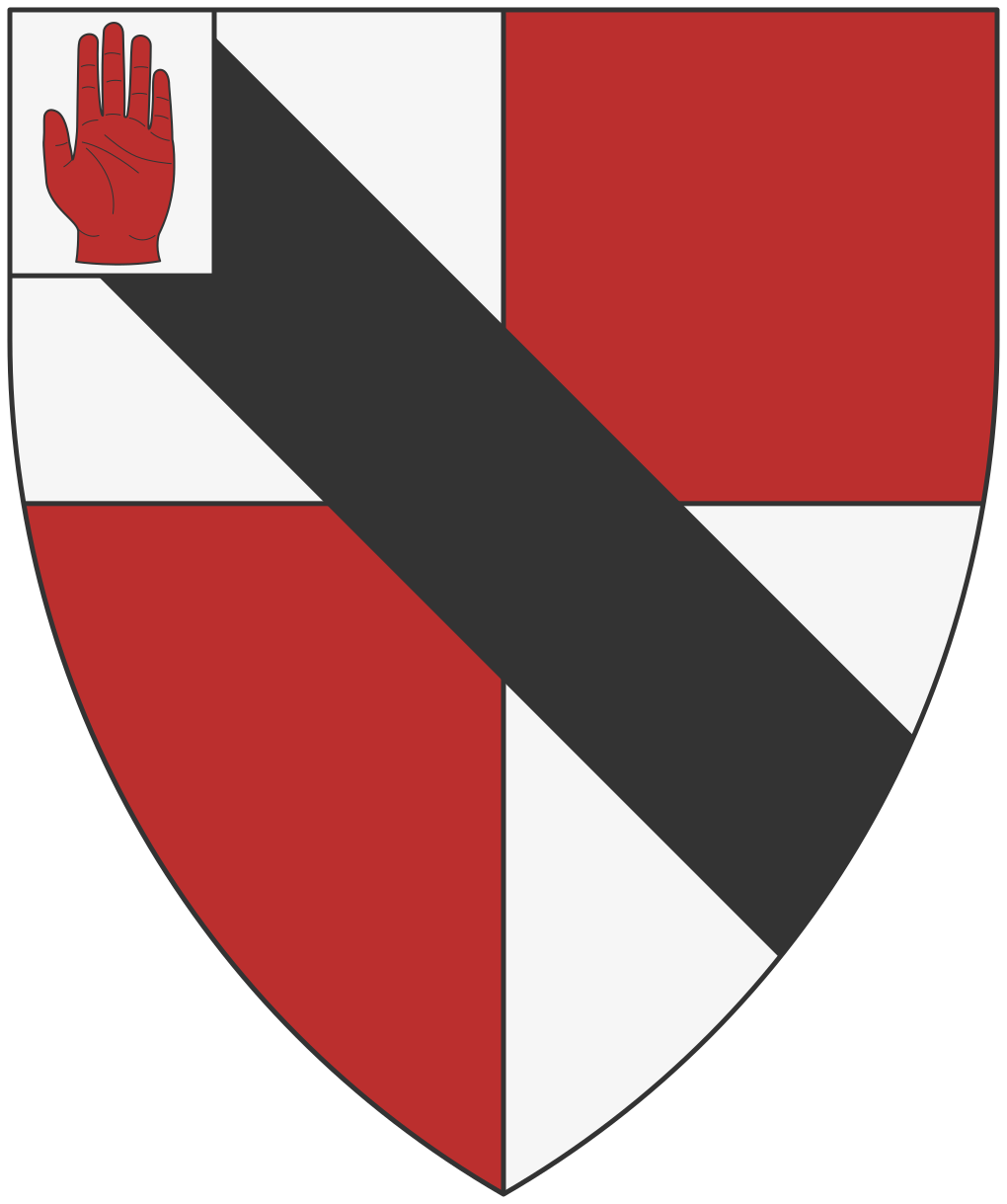
Arms of the Widdringtons of Widdrington and the Widdringtons of Cartington

There have been three baronetcies created for members of the Widdrington family, one in the Baronetage of Nova Scotia and two in the Baronetage of England. All three creations are extinct. The Widdringtons were an ancient Northumbrian family who took their name from the village near Morpeth, Northumberland. In the 17th century the family were strongly Royalist and were rewarded with one baronetcy in the Baronetage of Nova Scotia and two in the Baronetage of England. William Widdrington was created a baronet, of Widdrington in the County of Northumberland, in the Baronetage of England on 9 July 1642. For more information on this creation, see Baron Widdrington. His cousin Edward Widdrington was created a Baronet, of Widdrington in the County of Northumberland, in the Baronetage of Nova Scotia on 26 September 1635, and a Baronet, of Cartington in the County of Northumberland, in the Baronetage of England, on 8 August 1642. The Nova Scotia baronetcy became either extinct or dormant on his death in 1671 while the English baronetcy became extinct.

== Widdrington baronets, of Widdrington (1635) ==
- Sir Edward Widdrington, 1st Baronet (died 1671)

== Widdrington baronets, of Widdrington (1642) ==
- see Baron Widdrington

== Widdrington baronets, of Cartington (1642) ==
- Sir Edward Widdrington, 1st Baronet (died 1671)

== Other Widdringtons ==
- Thomas Widdrington (died 1664)
- Ralph Widdrington (died 1688)
- Ralph Widdrington (1640–1718)
