= Thomas Widdrington (disambiguation) =

Thomas Widdrington (died 1664) was an English politician and judge.

Thomas Widdrington may also refer to:

- Thomas Widdrington (died 1660) (1640–1660), English MP for Morpeth
- Tommy Widdrington (born 1971), English footballer and football manager

== See also ==
- Widdrington (name)
