= Henry Widdrington (died 1623) =

English politician

Sir Henry Widdrington (died 1623) was an English politician who sat in the House of Commons from 1604 to 1622.

Widdrington was the son of Edward Widdrington of Swinburne Castle and Ursula Carnaby. He succeeded to the estates of his uncle Henry Widdrington of Widdrington Castle in 1592. He was deputy warden and keeper of Ridsdale under Sir Robert Carey. As Knight Marshal and depute governor of Berwick-upon-Tweed he was criticised for allowing bankrupts to shelter from the law by buying the offices of soldiers in the garrison from him.

In May 1599, Henry Widdrington described how a football match had been arranged at Bewcastle as an occasion to capture the Armstrongs of Whitehaugh. The Armstrongs heard of the ambush and made a surprise attack. Widdrington held a banquet at Berwick for the Scottish diplomats John Skene and William Stewart in June 1590. They were travelling to London and then to Denmark.

At the Union of the Crowns, Widdrington was knighted by James VI and I at Widdrington on 9 April 1603. He was Captain of Tynemouth Castle until he was replaced by William Selby in 1606.

In 1604, he was elected Member of Parliament for Northumberland. He was High Sheriff of Northumberland in 1606. He was re-elected MP for Northumberland in 1614 and 1621.

Widdrington married Mary Curwen, daughter of Sir Nicholas Curwen. His son William was created Baron Widdrington.

After he died in 1623, the Privy Council of Scotland noted that there was now nobody taking care of justice on the borders of Scotland, then known as the "Middle Shires", particularly in Tynedale and Redesdale.

Parliament of England
Preceded by Sir Robert Carey; William Selby	Member of Parliament for Northumberland; 1604–1621; With: Ralph Grey 1604–1611; Sir George Selby 1614; William Selby 1614; Sir William Grey	Succeeded by Sir John Fenwick; Sir Francis Brandling
