= Robert Lilburne =

English parliamentarian soldier

Colonel Robert Lilburne
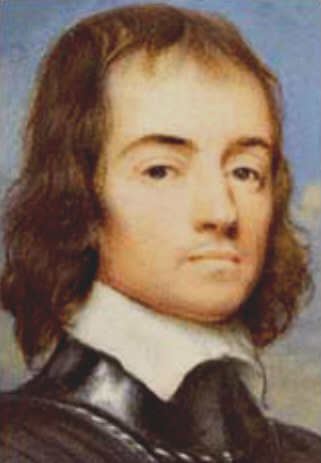
- Colonel Robert Lilburne

Governor of York
- In office 1654–1660

Personal details
- Born: 2 February 1614 (baptised) Auckland, County Durham
- Died: August 1665 St Nicholas Island, Plymouth (prison)
- Spouse: Margaret Beck
- Children: Robert, Richard, Ephraim
- Occupation: Parliamentarian soldier

Military service
- Rank: Colonel
- Battles/wars: Wars of the Three Kingdoms; Battle of Preston; Siege of Pontefract 1648-9); Battle of Dunbar; Battle of Wigan Lane

Robert Lilburne (1613–1665) is most notable as the elder brother of radical Leveller agitator John Lilburne. During the Wars of the Three Kingdoms, when the English Parliament fought against King Charles I, he had a distinguished military career as a colonel in the Parliamentarian armies; he was most prominent during the Second English Civil War in Scotland, as an officer of Oliver Cromwell in the New Model Army. Under Cromwell's rule as Lord Protector, he was elected as an MP to all three Protectorate Parliaments and raised to the rank of deputy major-general. In 1660 he took arms to resist the restoration of the monarchy.

In January 1649, he was a signatory to the death warrant of King Charles I, for which he was tried and convicted of treason as a regicide in October 1660. He died in prison in August 1665.

== Origins and family ==
Robert Lilburne was the eldest son and heir of Richard Lilburne of Thickley Punchardon in County Durham. He was baptised at St Andrew's, Auckland, on 2 February 1614.

He married Margaret, only daughter of Henry Beke of Hadenham, Buckinghamshire, and High Sheriff of that county in 1644. She was a relative by marriage of Oliver Cromwell. Robert and Margaret had three sons, who were all reported to be living in 1688:

- Robert - b. 1650
- Richard - b. 1652
- Ephraim - b. 1662

== First Civil War ==
In 1642, at the outbreak of the First English Civil War, Lilburne served first as Cornet in Lord Brooke’s troop of horse and later as Lieutenant in Richard Crosse’s troop, in the Earl of Essex’s Army, from 1642 to 1643. Brooke's unit fought at the Battle of Edgehill, the first major engagement of the war. In 1644, Lilburne, having reached the rank of captain, returned to the north where he raised his own regiment of horse, which became part of Lord Fairfax's Northern Association army.

In February 1645, Parliament "new-modelled" its armies to create a professional force under the command of Sir Thomas Fairfax, later Lord Fairfax. At the end of 1645, Ralph Weldon, colonel of the New Model Army's 8th Regiment of Foot, resigned to become governor of Plymouth, and Robert Lilburne was promoted to take his place early in 1646. He took part in the siege of Wallingford, which surrendered on 19 July 1646. Robert Lilburne remained an officer in the Army for the rest of his military career, rising to be named deputy major-general.

== Army mutiny ==
On 5 May 1646, King Charles surrendered to the Scots, marking the end of the first phase of the war. The majority in Parliament thereupon began to plan the reduction of the Army as surplus to requirements, some of the most troublesome regiments to be sent to Ireland, without addressing their arrears of pay. The Army, however, had been radicalised, in part by the activities of the Levellers, led by Robert Lilburne's imprisoned brother John. The soldiers addressed a petition to General Fairfax, supported by some of the most radical officers, among whom was Robert Lilburne, who was called before the House on 29 March to defend his action. At the same time, most of the officers in his regiment, who had formerly served under Colonel Weldon, petitioned Parliament to replace Lilburne with their lieutenant-colonel, Nicholas Kempson, and volunteered for service in Ireland.

At some point during the ensuing revolutionary action, General Fairfax removed Liburne from the field by appointing him governor of distant Newcastle-upon-Tyne. It was a brief appointment, as he was replaced on 30 December 1647 by Sir Arthur Haslerig. Liburne was thus not present with his regiment, called by some "the most mutinous regiment in the whole army", when on 15 November it drove off most off its officers and marched without orders onto the Corkbush Field rendezvous at Ware, with copies of John Lilburne's democratic manifesto Agreement of the People. The mutiny failed. Cromwell had eight or nine of Lilburne's troopers arrested, and three ringleaders were sentenced to death, with one, private Richard Arnold, shot on the spot before the rest.

== Second Civil War ==
The dispute between Parliament and the Army was interrupted by Charles I, who on 26 December 1647 signed an engagement with the Scots under the Duke of Hamilton to establish Presbyterianism in England in exchange for military assistance in regaining his throne. Hamilton's party was called the Engagers; he was opposed by the more extreme Kirk Party.

=== Background ===
Conflict between England and Scotland had been active since 1639, largely over religious issues, when Charles I, king of both countries, attempted to force the episcopal Anglican church on the Presbyterian Scots. The Scots responded by defeating England twice in the ensuing Bishops Wars, abolishing the episcopacy, and establishing a Presbyterian National Covenant. In 1643, when England's Parliament was at war with the king, it agreed to establish Presbyterianism in exchange for military assistance from Scotland. By 1647, Parliament had split into factions, the majority known as the Presbyterians, favouring a state church and a limited monarchy, and the more radical Independents, favouring religious tolerance and, eventually, no monarchy; Oliver Cromwell was a leader of this faction. Presbyterian leaders in Scotland increasingly felt threatened by the radicalism of the Independents and some were willing to help restore King Charles, as the lesser evil.

=== Royalist uprising ===
Beginning in May, Royalist uprisings in support of the king occurred in several places in England, notably in Kent and Colchester, which the Army under Fairfax put down. The most critical threat, however, came from the north, where Lilburne was then serving under Colonel John Lambert as colonel of a regiment of horse. On 28 April 1648, Royalist forces under Marmaduke Langdale attacked Berwick-upon-Tweed and Carlisle in Northumberland, and took Pontefract Castle in Yorkshire, in order to establish a bridgehead for an invading Scots army. Lambert sent Colonel Lilburne against the rising in Northumberland, where on 1 July he captured two Royalist commanders and took 400 prisoners.

On 8 July, Hamilton invaded England and occupied Carlisle, and Cromwell marched north to meet him.

Map: Battle of Preston

=== Battle of Preston ===
The Battle of Preston was a decisive defeat for both Hamilton's Scots and his Royalist allies. According to Reid, Hamilton had expected only to act as support for the Royalist uprisings, which by the time he reached England had already been put down, so that with the exception of Langdale, he was left to face the Army largely alone. At the time of the invasion, Cromwell had been in Wales besieging the Royalist forces holding Pembroke Castle, and following its capitulation on 1 July, he immediately marched north with such speed that he left his artillery train behind. His armies have been numbered at about 8500 men, while Hamilton had a nominal force of perhaps at most 24,000, but they were disorganised and uncoordinated in the face of the well-disciplined veterans of the Army.

Lambert's cavalry delayed the invaders while Cromwell was en route, so that Hamilton reached Hornby Castle, Lancashire only by 9 August, when he turned west toward Preston and the bridge over the River Ribble. By 12 August, Cromwell met up with Lambert near Wetherby in Yorkshire. The combined force advanced to engage Hamilton on his eastern flank, with the Scots army strung out in disorder along the road leading to the bridge crossing the Ribble and leading south. On the morning of 17 August, with Hamilton's forces half-way across the bridge - most of the cavalry across, most of the infantry still on the north side - Lambert's vanguard began the attack on Langdale's position in the moors north-east of Preston. However, the terrain was cut up by hedgerows and unsuitable for cavalry action. Dupuy believes it was a battle of pikemen on both sides; Reid supposes that Lilburn's horse was left in reserve.

During this action, Hamilton continued to push his infantry across the bridge, and after a long struggle, some of Langdale's troops followed them across. Cromwell then deployed his musketeers above the bridge and cut off the line of retreat. The next day, Cromwell's cavalry began a pursuit of the enemy already on the south side of the bridge. They reached Wigan that night and made a stand at Winwick the next day. At Warrington on the 19th, the beaten army surrendered 10,000 prisoners by Cromwell's count. On the 22nd, at Uttoxeter, Hamilton and his remaining cavalry surrendered to Lambert, ending the invasion.

Lilburne was active during the subsequent mopping-up operations, notably the siege of Pontefract Castle in Yorkshire.

=== Henry Lilburne ===
During the advance on Preston, Robert Lilburne suffered a personal loss. His youngest brother Lt.-Colonel Henry Lilburne, who had served under him in several of his commands since 1644, had recently been named Deputy Governor of Tynemouth Castle, when on 9 August he switched sides to support the king. Two days later, the castle was attacked by Sir Arthur Haslerig. Henry Lilburne was killed, and his head displayed over the castle's gate.

== Regicide ==
Following the conflict, some of the Independents in Parliament decided that the king was guilty of treason and must be removed. As the majority Presbyterian party would never agree, on 6 December 1648, they expelled those members from Parliament, leaving a "Rump" with Independents in the majority. These, on 6 January, passed an Act establishing a High Court of Justice to try the king. "Robert Lilbourne" was one of those named, and unlike many, accepted the charge to become one of the king's judges. On 29 January 1649, he signed his name to the king's Death Warrant, as twenty-eighth of the 59 signatories.

== Anglo-Scots War ==
The execution only provoked another war, as the king's heir claimed the throne as Charles II. The Scots offered him their throne on condition that he take the National Covenant, which he did on 23 June 1650. He was crowned on 1 January 1651. Cromwell, assuming that he intended an invasion, struck first.

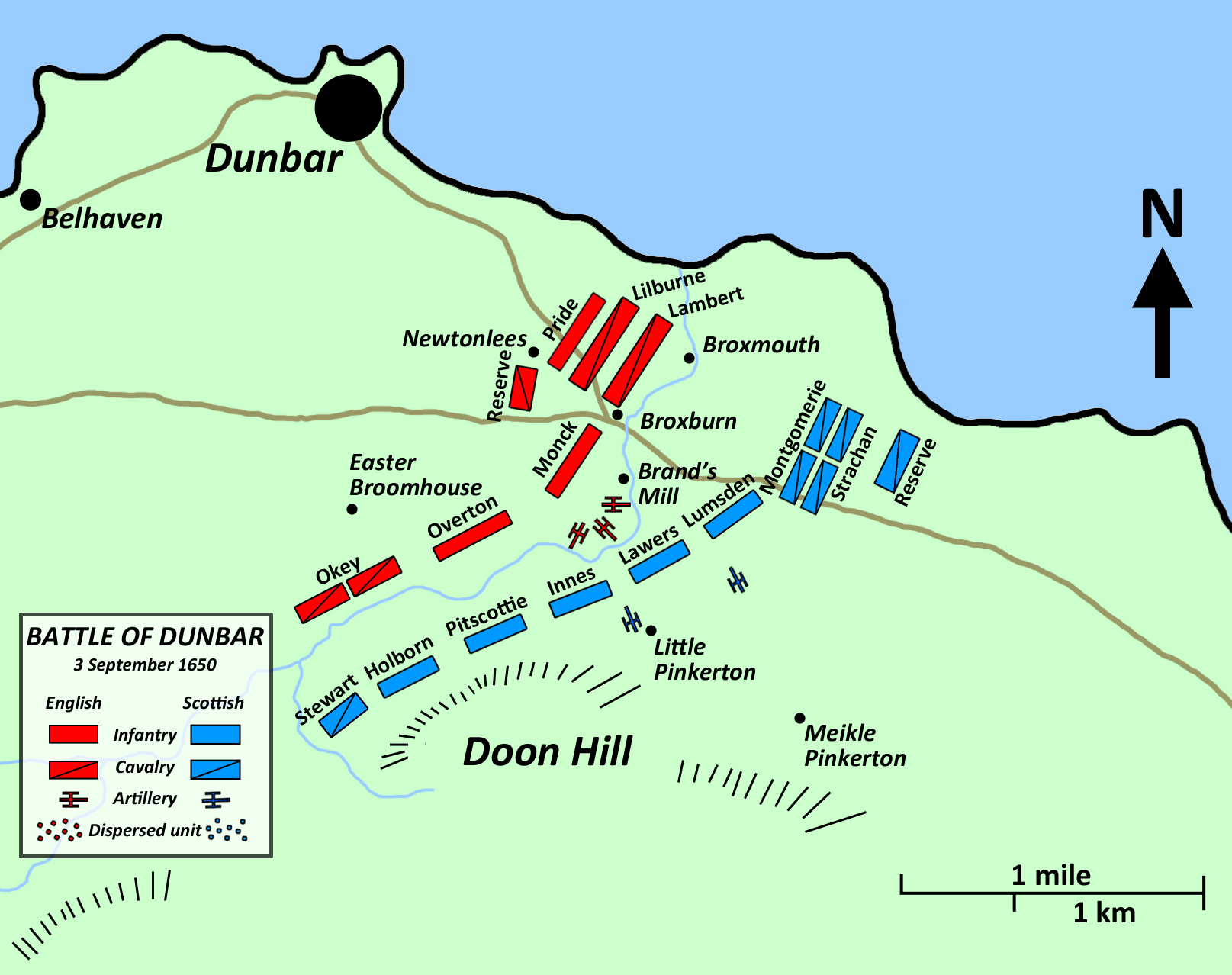
Map: Battle of Dunbar

=== Battle of Dunbar ===
The Third English Civil War was fought between the Commonwealth of England (the monarchy being abolished) and the Kingdom of Scotland. Oliver Cromwell was in command of the Commonwealth forces, and Lilburn served again under Lambert, Major-General of Horse. Cromwell's army crossed the border on 21 July 1650 and met stiff opposition. He sent his cavalry to Musselburgh, where Colonel Lilburne drove off a Scots attack on 31 July, but Cromwell was forced to fall back on Dunbar where his navy could support him. The position of Dunbar, a port surrounded by hills held by the Scots, was formidable. But the Scots assumed that he meant to evacuate by sea and were unprepared when, at dawn of 3 September, Lambert executed a surprise cavalry charge led by the regiments of Lilburne, Francis Hacker and Philip Twisleton, which claimed 3000 of the enemy killed and 10,000 taken prisoner. The defeated Scots army retreated toward Edinburgh, leaving Cromwell master of Scotland south of the Firth of Forth.

=== Battle of Wigan Lane ===
In August 1651 Charles II invaded England with a Scots army, and Cromwell shadowed his progress, leaving Colonel Lilburne in Lancashire with two regiments to block any Royalist reinforcements from joining the king. Near Wigan on 25 August, he routed a Royalist force of 1500 horse under Earl of Derby. This was his most notable military action, praised even by the Royalist biographer Noble:

He attacked the loyal and truly great Earl of Derby in 1651 with three regiments, and defeated his lordship at Wiggan in Lancashire; and so completely, that of one thousand five hundred men that he (Derby) brought into the field, he hardly had thirty, when he escaped to King Charles II at Worcester; the engagement lasted about an hour.

His report to Cromwell on the battle:

Wigan, 15th August, 1651. Honoured Sir, -The Lord hath pleased, this day to appear for us, in the totall rout and overthrow of the Lord of Derby and his forces, which was increased to about 1,500. He himself, though wounded, escaped, though narrowly. I would only entreat you to send out what horse you have or can get, to ride up and downe the country to gather up stragglers. I cannot enlarge myself at present, but I entreat you to accept of this from him that desires to expresse himself. Your ammunition is come safe. The Lord of Derby I heare is fled towards Bolton, but his sumptures and tresure are here. We intended for Manchester this night, and had hopes to take my Lord Generall's regiment of foot, and to have had five hundred men in readinesse to joyne with them. The Lord Witherington cannot live long. Colonell Boynton and Tyldesley are slaine, and others very considerable. I have divers colonels prisoners. Your very humble Servant, ROBERT LILBURNE.

Parliament declared a Day of Thanksgiving.

== Commonwealth and Protectorate ==
In November 1651 Colonel Lilburne returned to Scotland as part of Major-General Richard Deane's army of occupation. In December 1652, Lilburne took over command of the army in Scotland, but he was unable to suppress the July 1653 Glencairn's Uprising in the Highlands. The command was given to General George Monck in early 1654.

For the duration of Oliver Cromwell's tenure as head of state, as it devolved from a republican commonwealth to a military dictatorship, Lilburne maintained his loyalty. In 1654 he was appointed Governor of York and the next year he commanded the army units that put down the Sealed Knot uprising in York. In 1654 he was elected MP for County Durham in the First Protectorate Parliament. During the Rule of the Major-Generals he was appointed on 19 October 1655 (retaining the rank of colonel) as deputy to John Lambert, responsible for the day-to-day administration of Yorkshire and County Durham. He was elected MP for the East Riding of Yorkshire in the Second Protectorate Parliament of 1656. However, he opposed the offer of the crown to Cromwell.

== Religious Radical ==
Compared to his younger brother John, Robert Lilburne was less a political radical than a religious one. He was one of Cromwell's "godly honest men as captains of horse". He was a Baptist, which put him at odds with the intolerance of the Presbyterians in Parliament during the 1640s. His regimental chaplain was a Baptist preacher. During his brief tenure as governor of Newcastle in 1647, following the Army mutiny, he was involved with an early Baptist congregation there.

As Deputy Major-General of Yorkshire and Durham from 1655, he was tolerant of the Baptists and other sectaries under his jurisdiction. He supported the proposal to establish a university or college at Durham as "a pious and laudable work" outside the authority of the two established universities in the country.

At about this time, he may have become attracted to the teachings of the Quakers.

== Restoration ==
With the death of Oliver Cromwell and the failure of his heir Richard Cromwell, there was increasing agitation in England for the restoration of the monarchy. Lilburne helped put down the premature Royalist Booth's Uprising of 15–19 August 1659. He followed the lead of his old commander Lambert in supporting the rule of the Army and was appointed to the Army's Committee of Safety on 26 October. He followed Lambert when he marched to stop General George Monck advancing on London, but his troops in York deserted when Fairfax came out for Monck and the restoration of the monarchy.

On 6 June 1660, King Charles II issued a Proclamation ordering a list of persons involved in the execution of King Charles I to surrender themselves under pain of being excepted from pardon. Robert Lilburne, as a signatory of the death warrant, was listed and surrendered.

On 16 October, he was tried at the Sessions House at the Old Bailey, pleaded Not Guilty, and was convicted of treason. He then made his statement. "I shall refer myself without farther trouble to the court; My Lord, I beg the benefit of the proclamation." He was sentenced to be hanged, drawn and quartered, but the sentence was commuted to life imprisonment. He died a prisoner on St Nicholas Island ( Drake's Island) in Plymouth Sound in August 1665. At his death, his father was still living, and thus the estate of Thickley Punchardon passed to his son Robert Lilburne without being forfeited to the Crown.
