= Bewcastle =

Civil parish in Cumbria, England

Coordinates: 55.06306°N 2.68261°W

- Civil parish
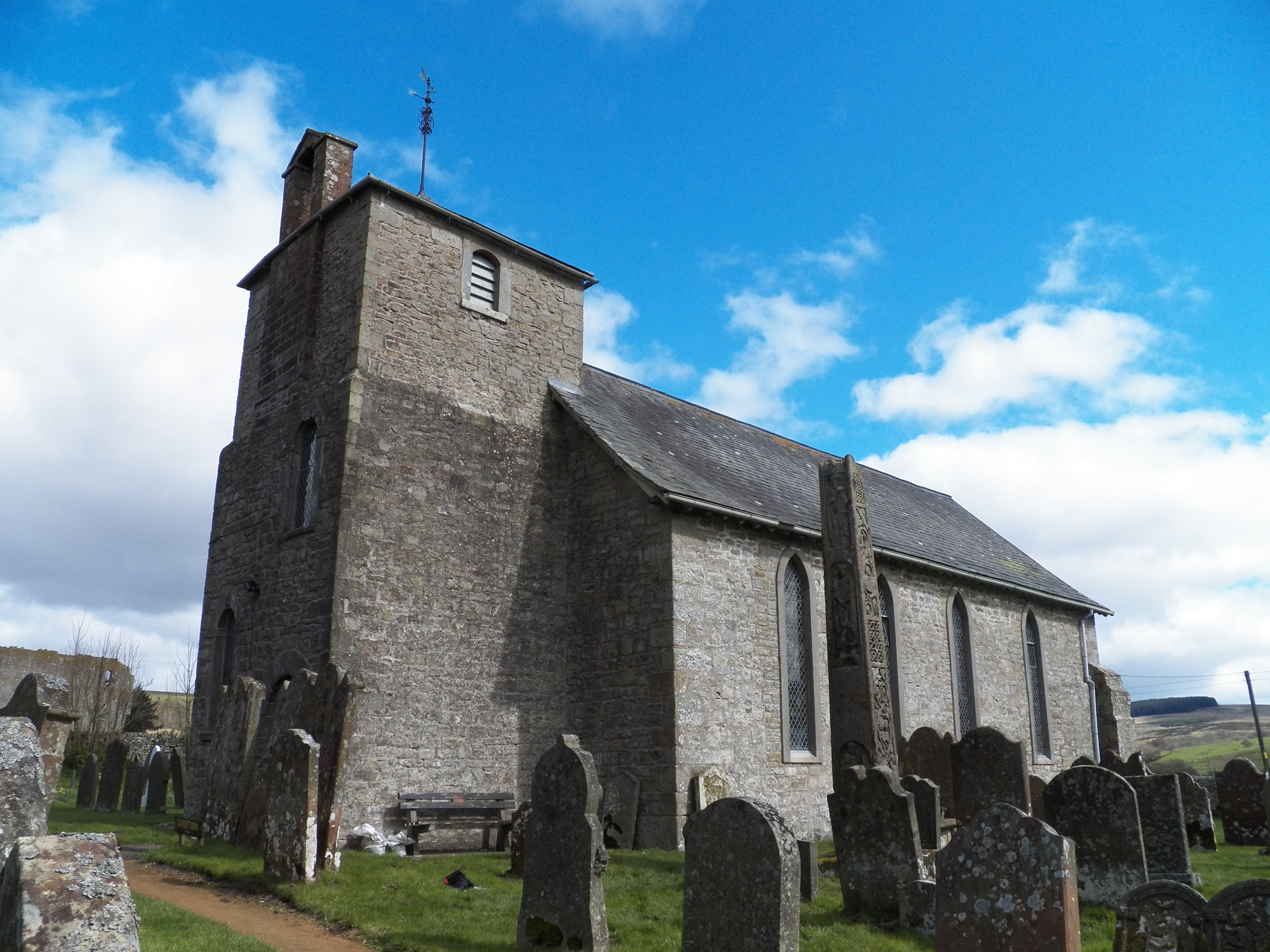
- Bewcastle church and cross

- Location within Cumbria
- Population: 397 (2021 census)
- OS grid reference: NY565745
- Civil parish: Bewcastle
- Unitary authority: Cumberland
- Ceremonial county: Cumbria
- Region: North West
- Country: England
- Sovereign state: United Kingdom
- Post town: CARLISLE
- Postcode district: CA6
- Post town: NEWCASTLETON
- Postcode district: TD9
- Dialling code: 016977
- Police: Cumbria
- Fire: Cumbria
- Ambulance: North West
- UK Parliament: Carlisle
- Website: http://www.bewcastle.com/

Bewcastle is a large civil parish in the Cumberland unitary authority area of Cumbria, England. It was in the historic county of Cumberland.

According to the 2001 census the parish had a population of 411, reducing to 391 at the 2011 Census, increasing to 397 in 2021. The parish is large and includes the settlements of Roadhead and Sleetbeck. To the north the parish extends to the border with Scotland. To the east the parish bounds Northumberland.

== Toponymy ==
The origin of the name Bewcastle can be traced accurately from its spelling in ancient documents. These show that it was originally "bothy/booth caster", which translates as "the Roman fort where there were bothies or shielings". 'Cæster' is "an Anglian side-form of OE 'ceaster', referring to the defences of the Roman camp...a medieval fortress was built within these defences..." The original form of the first element "was clearly 'Buth-' from ON búð, 'booth'." (OE=Old English; ON=Old Norse).

Antiquarians, who did not have our access to well-catalogued and studied ancient documents, leapt at the chance to link the place name with a semi-mythological figure named Bueth, due to his romantic links with the prestigious Barony of Gilsland. The well-respected book The Place-names of Cumberland states that it is "impossible" for Bewcastle to be named after Bueth.

== Governance ==
Bewcastle is in the parliamentary constituency of Carlisle.

== Church and cross ==
St Cuthbert's churchyard contains the famous 7th-Century Bewcastle Cross. The sundial on its surface is the oldest in Britain, divided into the four 'tides' which governed the working day in medieval times. Its importance has been described by Nikolaus Pevsner thus: "The crosses of Bewcastle and Ruthwell ... are the greatest achievement of their date in the whole of Europe." A reconstruction of the whole cross is located in the churchyard of St Mary's neo-Romanesque Church at Wreay near Carlisle, but this differs in style and detail from the original. Stephen Matthews calls the Wreay cross a "reinvention".

== Roman fort ==
The parish is also known for its unusual hexagonal Bewcastle Roman Fort, which has been identified as Fanum Cocidi; its grassy ramparts can still be seen surrounding the churchyard. The fort was originally built from turf and timber and garrisoned by the First Nervian Cohort of Germans. It was built as an outlying defence of Hadrian's Wall to the south, to which it was linked by a road direct from the Roman fort of Banna (Birdoswald) on the wall, and a signal station on Gillalees Beacon between the two. The fort was later rebuilt in stone. Much of the stone was subsequently used to build a Norman castle within the northern perimeter of the fort. The ruins of Bewcastle Castle have recently been consolidated by English Heritage, and are accessible to the public without charge.

== People ==
Two brothers born in Bewcastle, Joseph Armstrong (1816–1877) and George Armstrong (1822–1901), became noted steam locomotive engineers; their careers were spent mainly on the Great Western Railway.

== Gallery ==
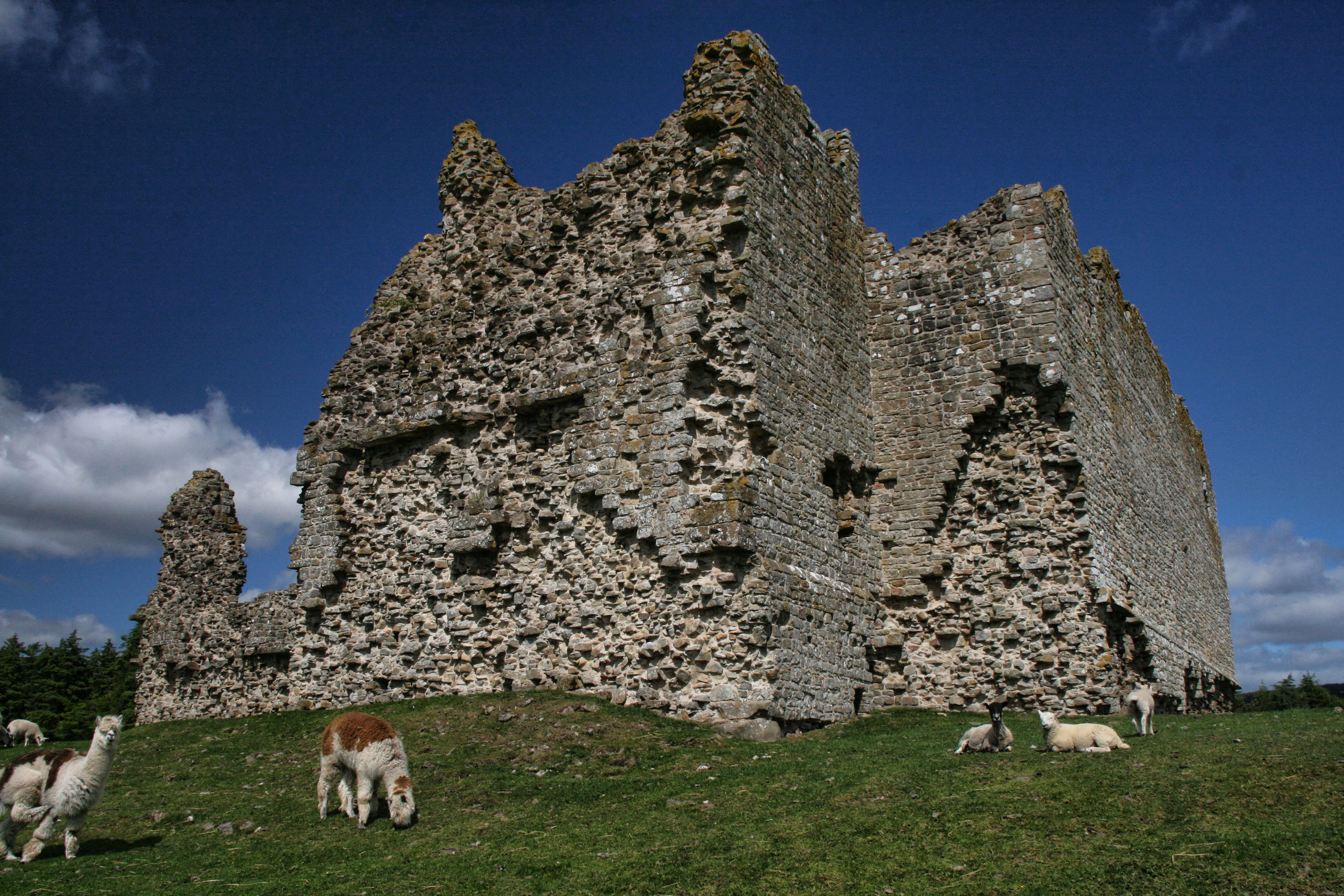
Bewcastle castle

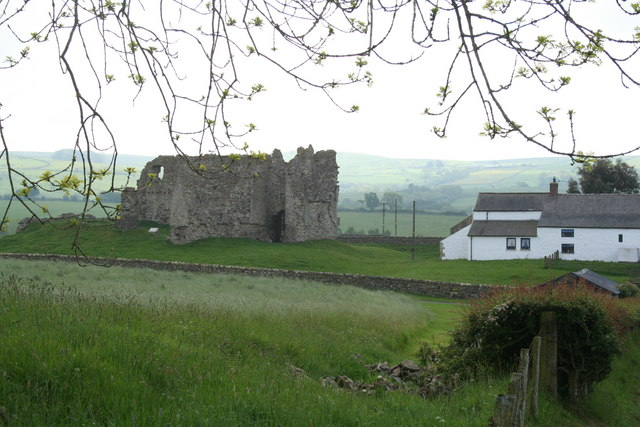
The castle

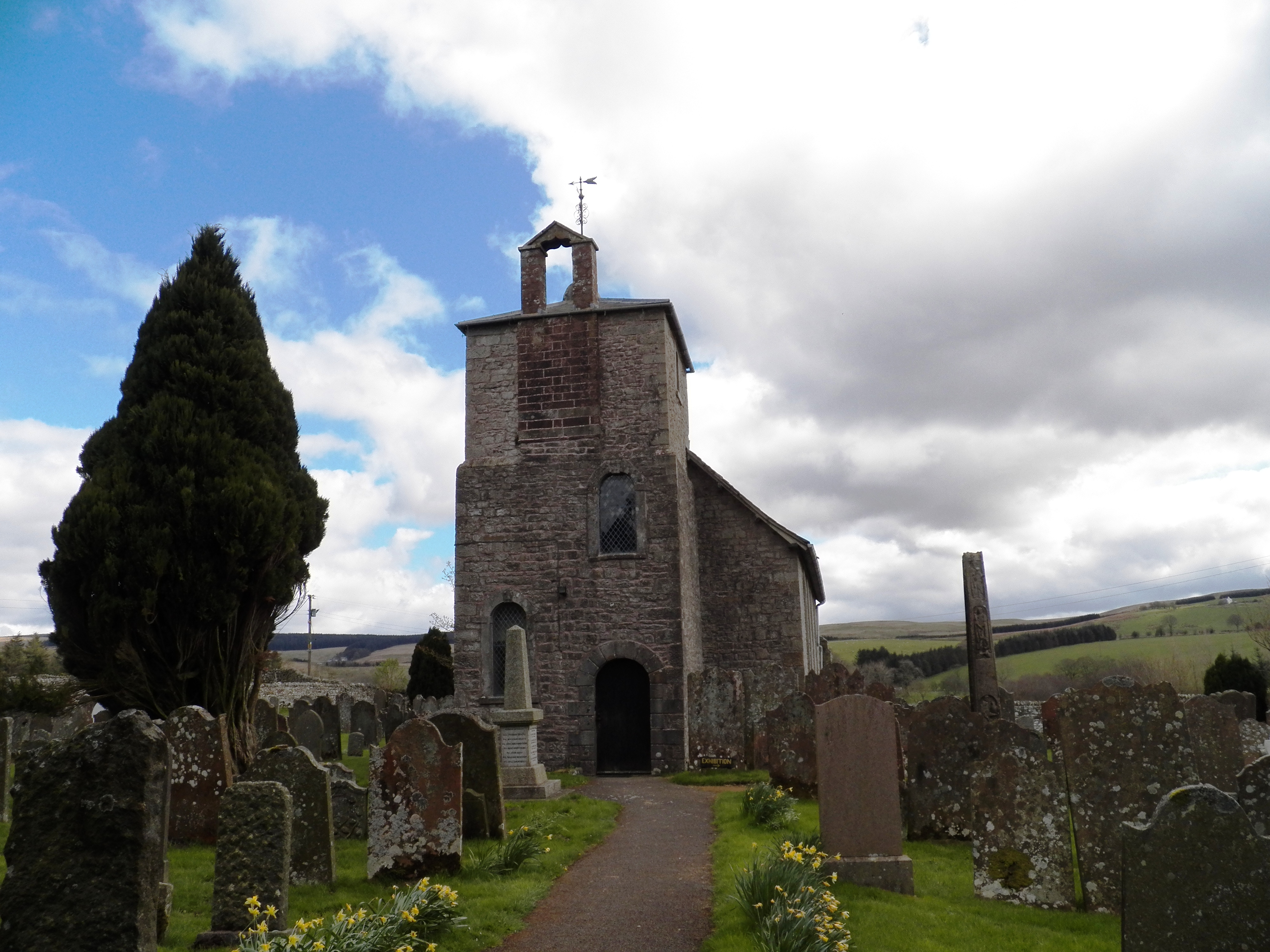
Bewcastle church and cross from the west

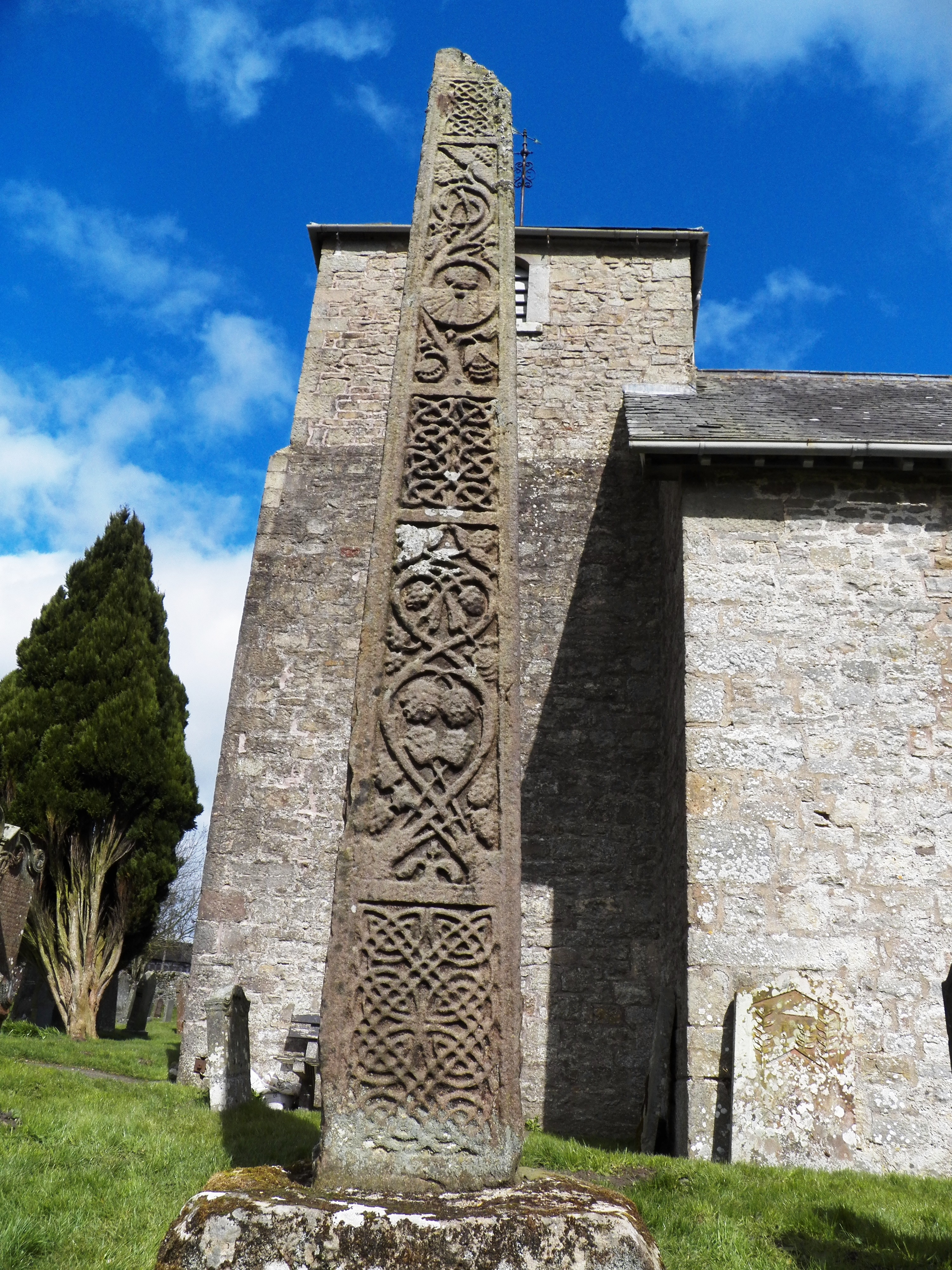
Bewcastle cross south perspective view

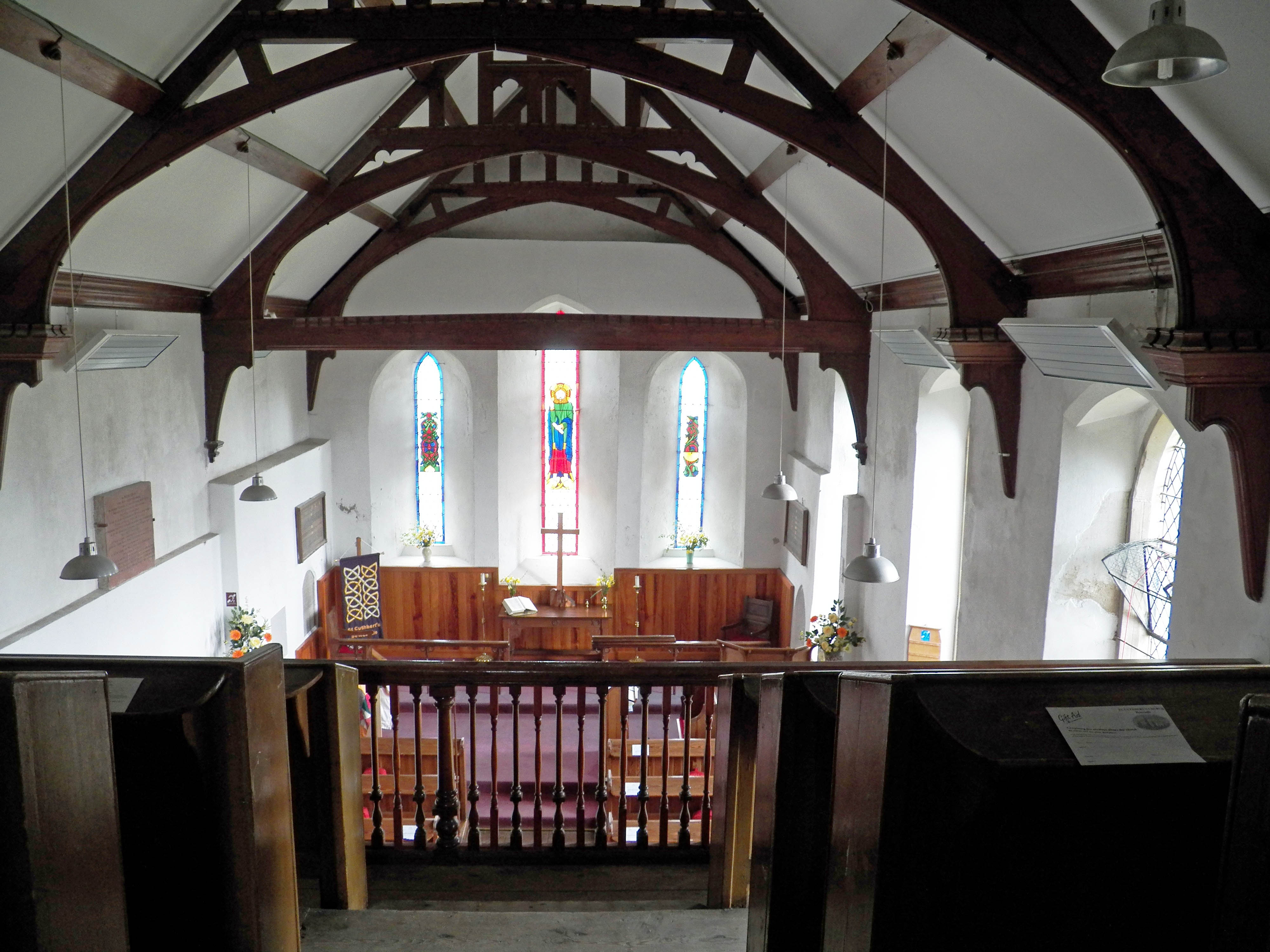
Interior of St Cuthbert's church, Bewcastle, Cumbria.

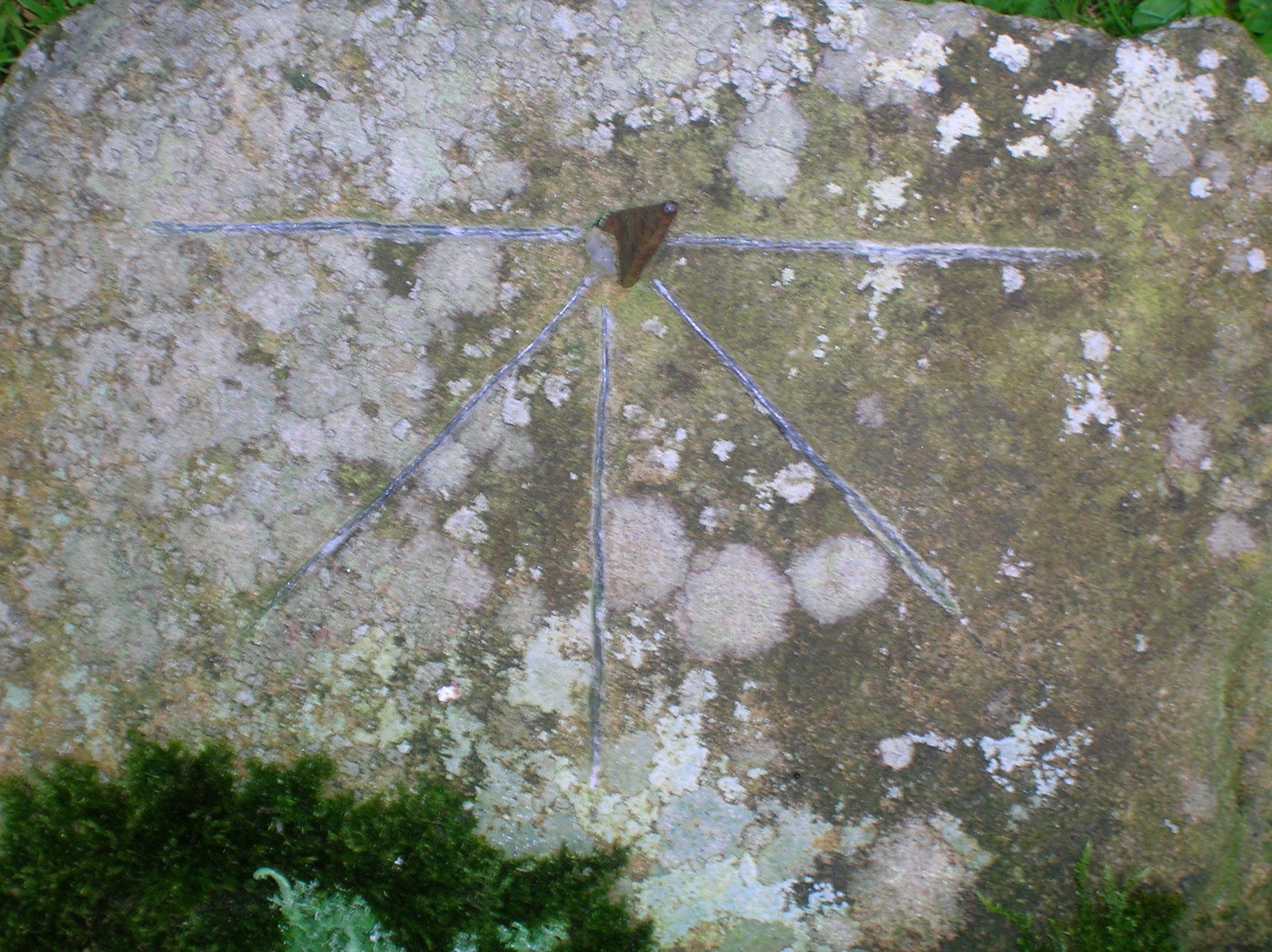
Example sundial at another location showing the four 'Tides' as on the Bewcastle Cross

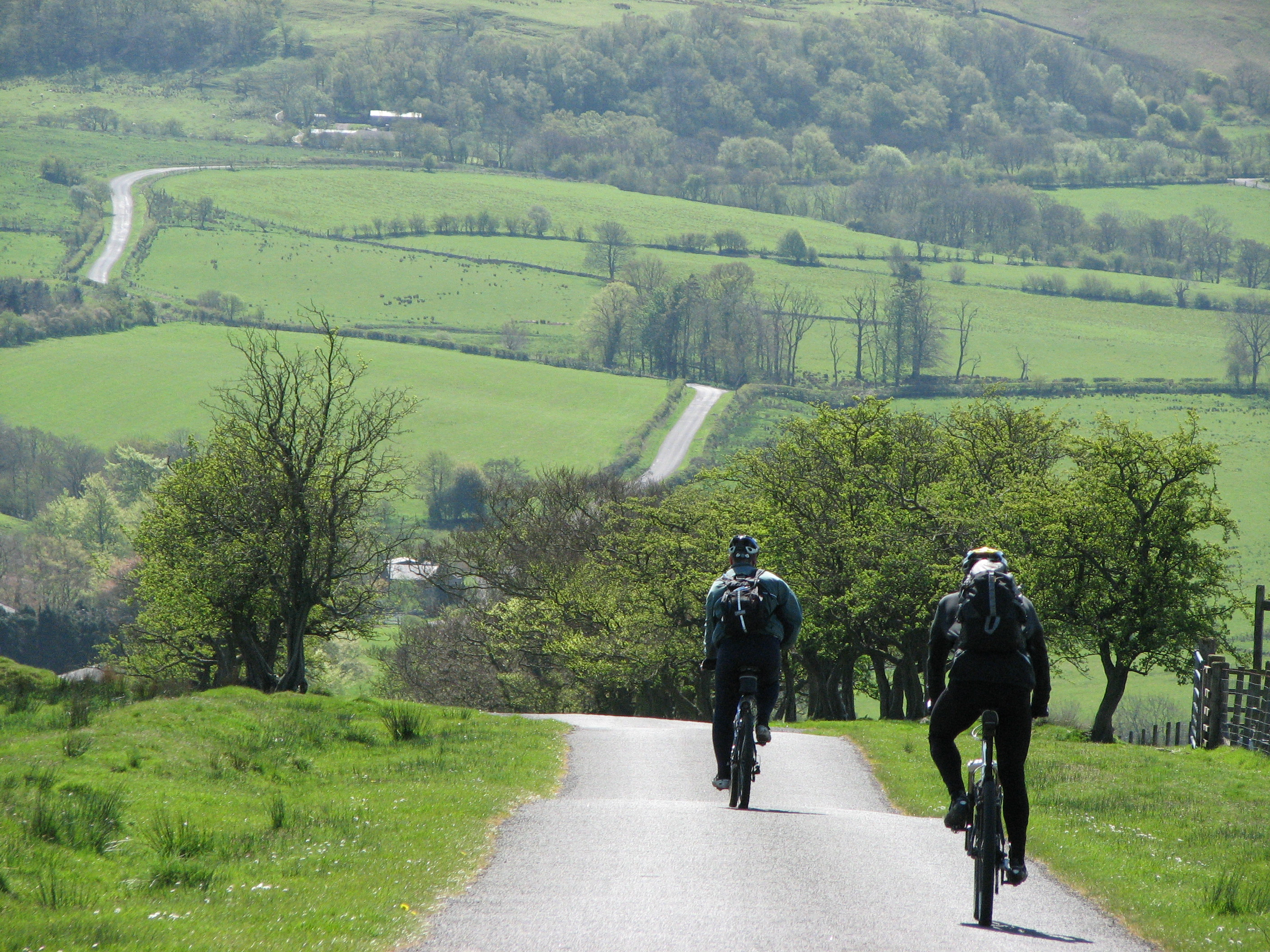
Countryside at Bewcastle

== See also ==
- Listed buildings in Bewcastle

== Bibliography ==
- Marshall, John (1978). A Biographical Dictionary of Railway Engineers. Newton Abbot: David & Charles. ISBN 0-7153-7489-3.
