= Bewcastle Roman Fort =

Former fort in England

- Fanum Cocidi
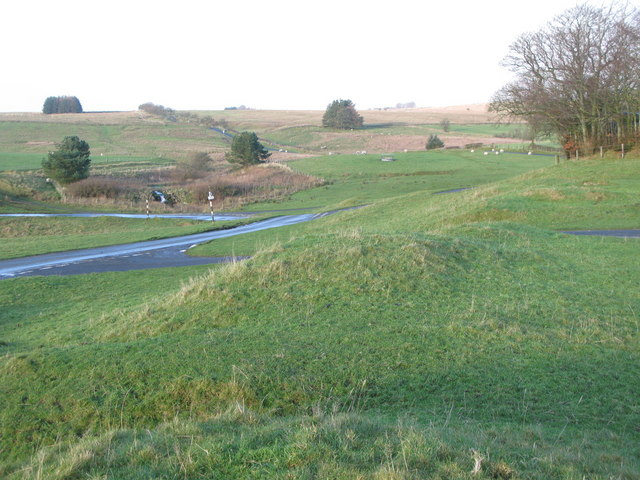
- Ramparts of the Roman fort at Bewcastle

- Location within Cumbria
- 55.064°N 2.685°W
- Location: Cumbria, England

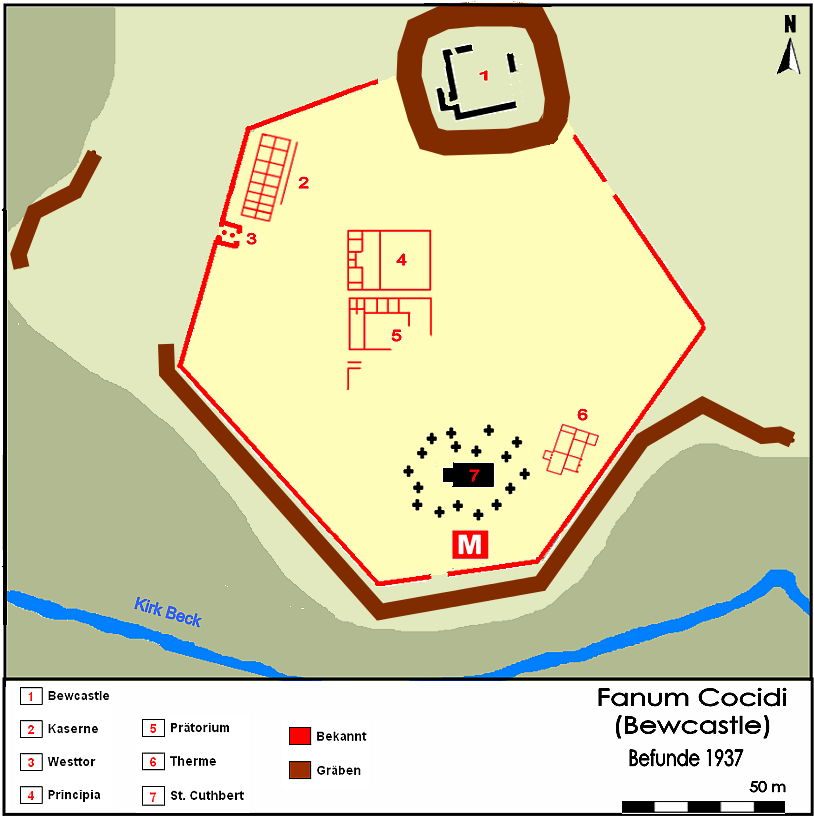
Plan of Fanum Cocidi (Bewcastle) after 1937 excavations: 1. Bewcastle Castle (medieval); 2. Barracks; 3. Western gate; 4. Principia; 5. Praetorium; 6. Thermae; 7. St Cuthbert Church with Bewcastle Cross; Red = known structures Brown = ditch

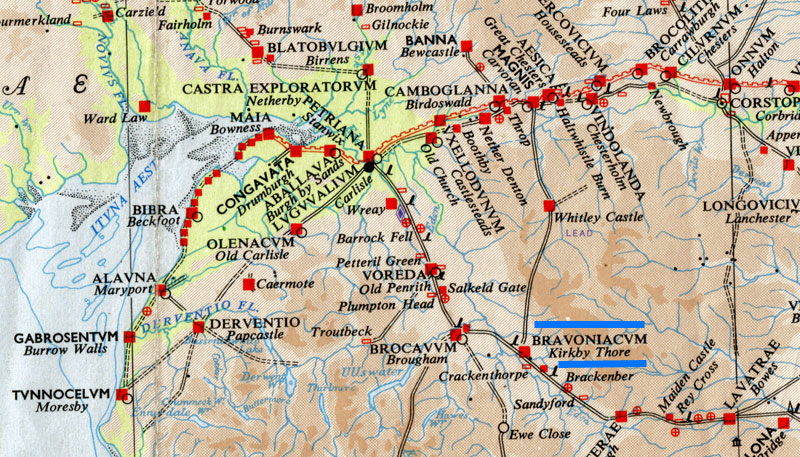
Forts near Hadrian's wall

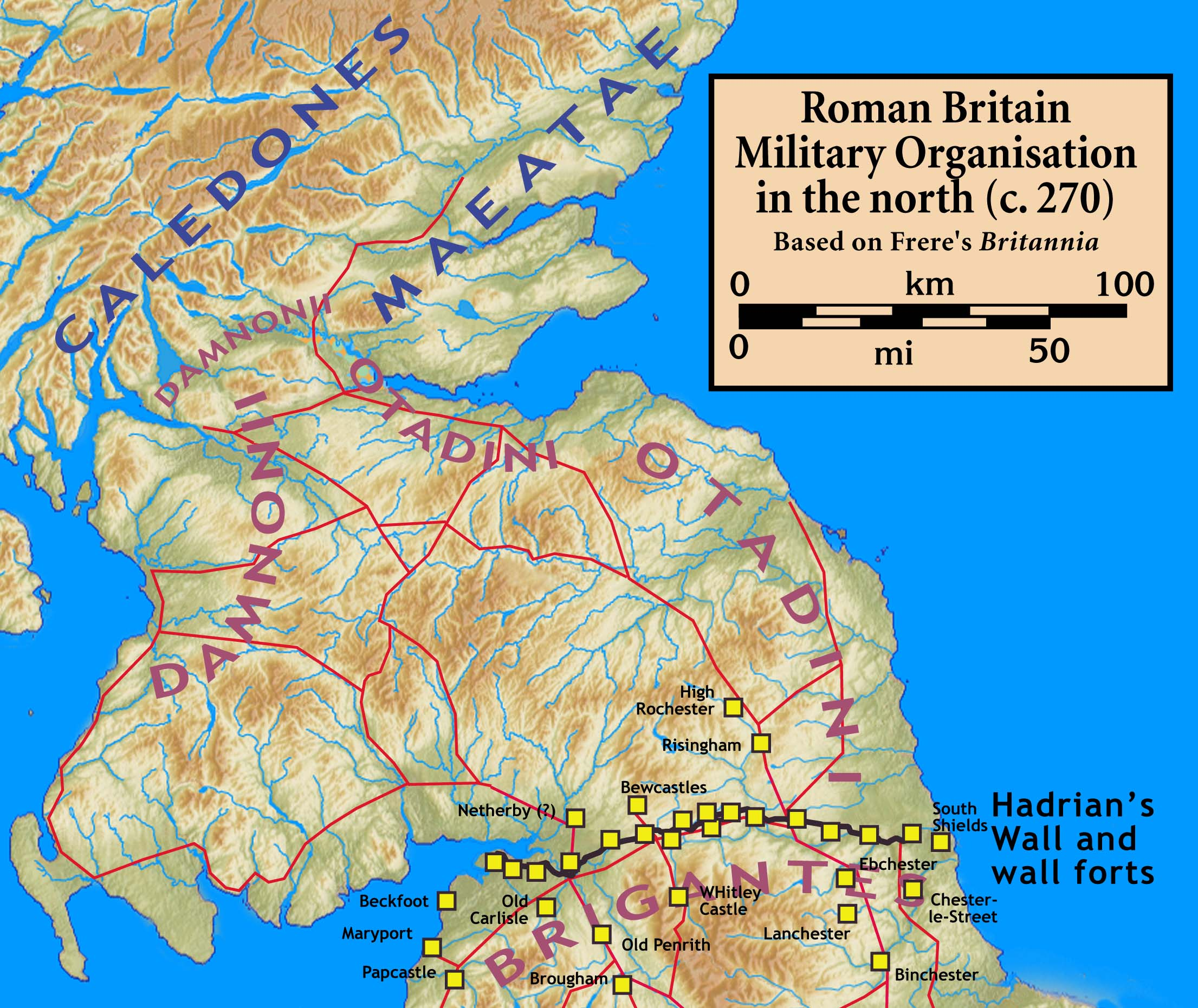
Roman forts in 270 AD

Bewcastle Roman Fort was built to the north of Hadrian's Wall as an outpost fort possibly intended for scouting and intelligence. The remains of the fort are situated at the village of Bewcastle, Cumbria, 7 miles (11 km) to the north of the Roman fort at Birdoswald, on Hadrian's Wall.

The Roman name for the fort was Fanum Cocidi (as recorded in the Ravenna Cosmography), and means 'The Shrine of Cocidius', a deity worshipped in northern Britain. The fort was identified as Fanum Cocidi on the basis that, of nine altars discovered on the site, six are dedicated to the god Cocidius.

== Description ==
The fort was unusual for a Roman fort, being an irregular hexagon rather than oblong, and occupied the whole of the small plateau on which it stood. It occupied an area of almost 6 acres (24,000 m^{2}). The fort was connected to Banna by a Roman road sometimes known by the modern name of the Maiden Way. Two stone signalling towers have been discovered between the two forts (at Barron's Pike and Robin Hood's Butts), and it is believed that these were used to relay signals between the forts.

It is believed that the fort was built at about the same time as the forts on Hadrian's Wall around 124 AD, and that it was originally built with turf defences and timber buildings, but with gates and headquarters of stone. An inscription indicates the fort was built by the Cohors I Dacorum. After 142, a short period of abandonment coinciding with the move into Scotland followed, and the fort was reoccupied in c. 163. During the Antonine period, the turf ramparts were faced with stone.

It was later completely rebuilt in stone. There were gateways to the north, south, east and west, the west gateway being the main one. The commandant's house (praetorium) was in the approximate centre of the hexagon, with the headquarters (principia) to the immediate north of it. A Hadrianic-style bathhouse was situated in the south-east section of the fort.

Building inscriptions found at the site indicate that detachments from at least three legions were involved in the building of the fort, the Second Legion (stationed at Caerleon in Wales), the Sixth Legion (based in York) and the Twentieth Legion (based in Chester).

The fort was largely destroyed in 343 when Hadrian's Wall was overrun. It was subsequently rebuilt but was finally destroyed after the barbarian invasion of 367 and was abandoned.

== Garrison ==
The second-century garrison was the First Cohort of Dacians, a thousand-strong infantry unit. The third-century garrison is believed to be the Cohort I Nerviorum (part-mounted).

== Excavations ==
Limited excavations were carried out in 1937, 1954 and 1957. These established the positions of the internal buildings and uncovered several altars.

== Current site ==
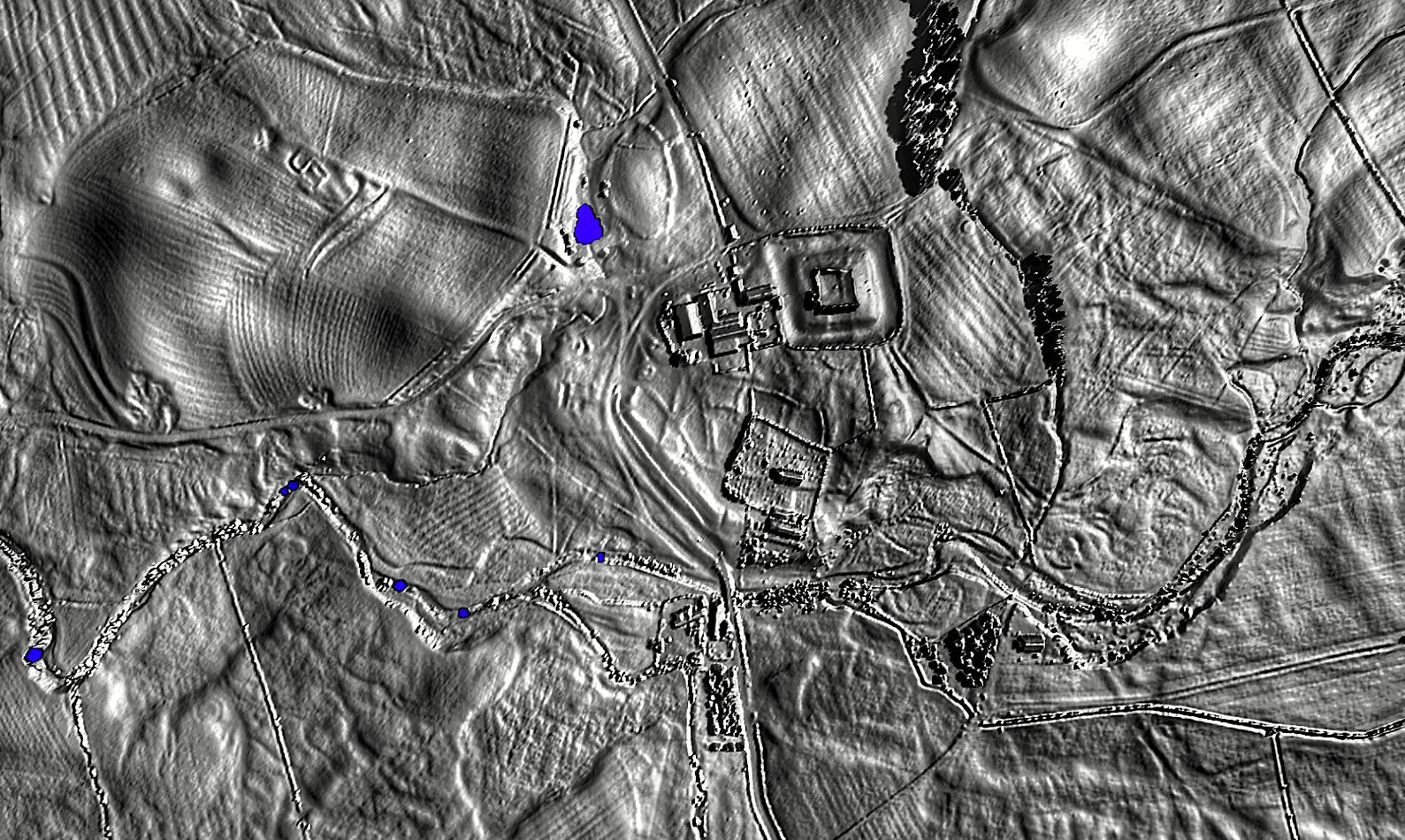
A lidar view of the site of Bewcastle hexagonal Roman fort (top left) and deserted medieval village (DMV).

The embankments and ditches of the fort can still be seen. St Cuthbert’s Church and churchyard occupy the southern part of the site, and the churchyard contains the famous Bewcastle Cross.

To the north-east of the site are the remains of Bewcastle Castle, a Norman castle built in about 1092, using stones from the Roman fort. The castle was reputedly destroyed by Oliver Cromwell in 1641.
