= Timothy Fetherstonhaugh =

Sir Timothy Fetherstonhaugh (died 1651) was an English royalist during the English Civil War.

Fetherstonhaugh was son of Henry Fetherstonhaugh of Kirkoswald, Cumberland, high sheriff of that county under James I, who was second son of Albany Fetherstonhaugh of Fetherstonhaugh, Northumberland, by his wife Lucy, daughter of Edmund Dudley of Yanwath, Westmoreland. His mother was Dorothy, daughter of Thomas Wybergh of Clifton, Westmoreland. In 1620 he was admitted a member of Gray's Inn. He was knighted at Whitehall on 1 April 1628. During the English Civil War he liberally contributed money to the royal cause, raised troops at his own expense, and served in the field. In 1642 he marched with Sir William Hudleston to King Charles at York, having under him three hundred foot.

In February 1644 he left Oxford with introductions from the king and Lord Digby for Ireland, where he applied to Ormonde to send troops for the relief of Cumberland. At the Battle of Wigan Lane, Lancashire, 26 August 1651, he was taken prisoner, and after trial by court-martial at Chester he was beheaded in that city on 22 October, despite his plea that he had quarter for life given him.

He married Bridget, daughter of Thomas Patrickson of Caswell-How in Ennerdale, Cumberland. Two of his sons were slain at the Battle of Worcester on 3 September 1651; the elder, Henry, had been knighted on the field there. The family's losses amounted, it is said, to 10,000l. In June 1661 two other sons, Philip and John, were obliged to petition for places as pages to the queen ‘to lessen the charges of their mother, who was brought very low by the late times’. The petition was granted. These appointments and the present of a portrait of Charles I are said to have been the only recompense the family received. In the chancel of Kirkoswald Church is a monument to the memory of Sir Timothy erected by his grandson Thomas. His portrait is given in the frontispiece of William Winstanley's ‘The Loyall Martyrology,’ 1665, from which an enlarged engraving was published in octavo.
