= William Selby (died 1638) =

English politician

Sir William Selby (died 1638) was an English politician who sat in the House of Commons from 1597 to 1601.

== Biography ==
Selby was the son of Sir John Selby of Twizell. He was educated at Peterhouse, Cambridge in 1573. In 1597, he was elected Member of Parliament for Northumberland. He was re-elected MP for Northumberland in 1601. He was knighted in 1603 and was High Sheriff of Northumberland in the same year. He was Sheriff of Northumberland again in 1606. In 1611 he succeeded to Ightham Mote and the estates in Kent of his uncle Sir William Selby. He was gentleman porter of Berwick upon Tweed in succession to his father.

Selby married Dorothy Bonham (1572–1641). She was a friend of Lady Anne Clifford. Dame Dorothy and Sir William obtained permission to receive Holy Communion – compulsory at the time – at home, giving rise to suspicion that they favoured Catholicism.

There is a tradition that Dorothy Selby helped reveal the Gunpowder Plot, apparently via the medium of needlework as recorded and depicted on her tomb at Ightham. She is said to have died of blood-poisoning from the prick of a needle while working at embroidery. Selby first heard of the Gunpowder Plot on 10 November 1605, while riding from Carlisle to Newcastle.

Selby died on 14 February 1637/8 at Ightham. The couple had no children: his estates in the north of England passed to William Selby, second son of Sir Ralph Selby.

Parliament of England
Preceded by Sir William Reade alias Kynnerd; Robert Widdrington	Member of Parliament for Northumberland; 1597–1601; With: Sir Robert Carey	Succeeded by Ralph Grey; Henry Widdrington
