= Battle of Wigan Lane =

Battle during Third English Civil War

- Part of Third English Civil War
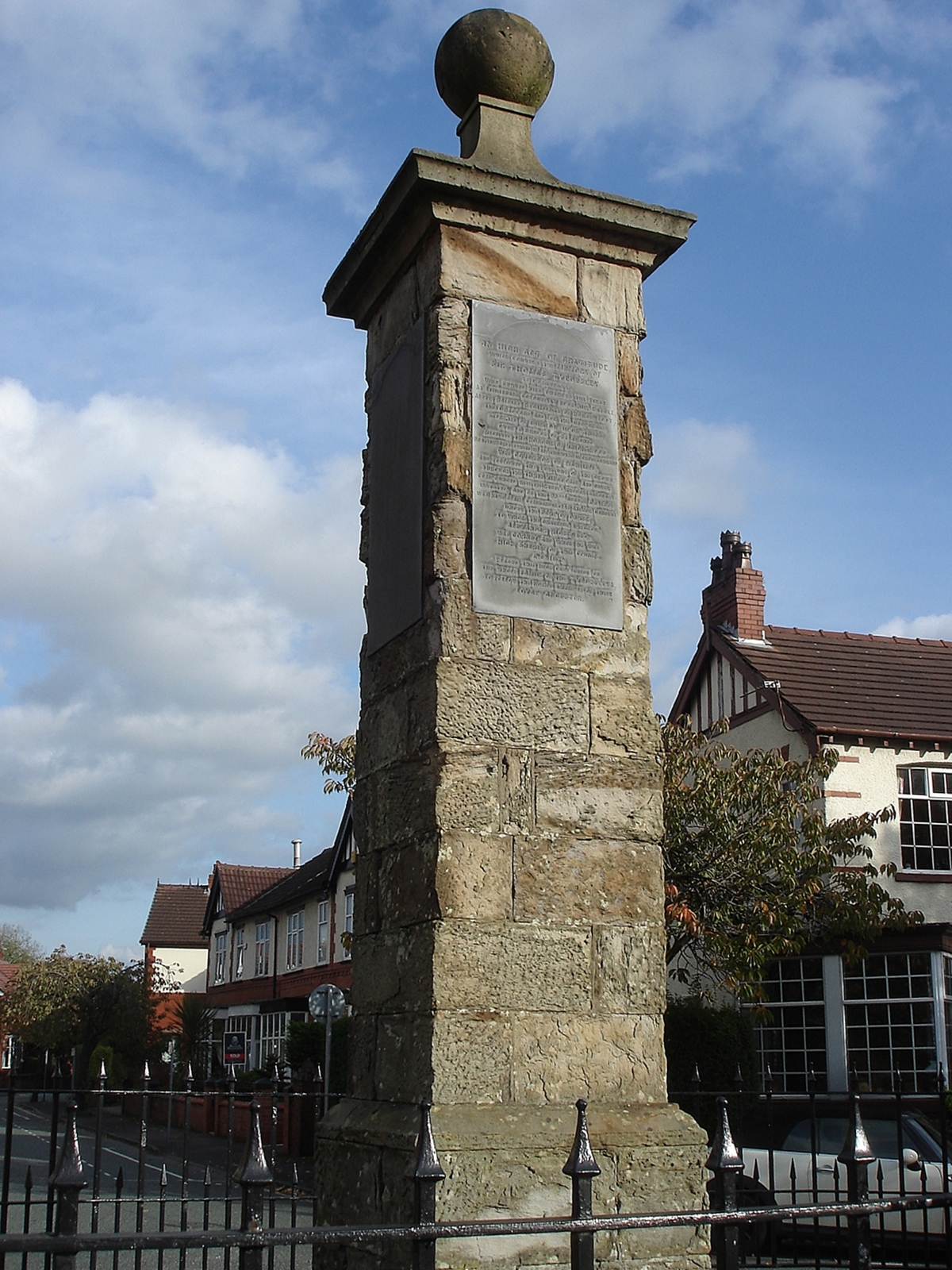
- Monument to Sir Thomas Tyldesley at the site of the battle
Date	25 August 1651
Location	Wigan, England 53°33′17″N 2°37′40″W
Result	Parliamentarian victory

Belligerents
(Commonwealth of England) Parliamentarians	Royalists

Commanders and leaders
(Commonwealth of England) Colonel Robert Lilburne (Commonwealth of England) Colonel Thomas Birch	Earl of Derby; Lord Widdrington †; Sir William Throgmorton †; Sir Thomas Tyldesley †; Colonel Boynton †

Strength
603 (Colonel Robert Lilburne Regiment of Horse); 30 horse (from Liverpool as well as volunteers with shotguns mounted as Dragoons); 200 (2 companies of Cheshire Trained Band of Foot); 100 (1 company of foot from Manchester); 100 (one company of John Birch's Regiment of Foot); 2,100 (Cromwell's 2 Regiments of Foot and detached company of horse); Total: 3,000	1,000 (Earl of Derby’s Regiment of Foot); 600 (Earl of Derby’s Regiment of Horse); Total: 600-1,500

Casualties and losses
1 killed 10 wounded (claim by Lilburne); 700 killed (Royalist claim)	64 killed 400 captured
- The Earl of Derby's memoir gives alternate strengths of 1800 Dragoons in Lilburnes initial force and just 600 gentlemen in his own neglecting all mention of his own foot though these accounts of the war are exaggerated.
- Greater Manchester

The Battle of Wigan Lane was fought on 25 August 1651 during the Third English Civil War, between a Royalist army led by the Earl of Derby and forces loyal to the Commonwealth of England under Colonel Robert Lilburne. The Royalists were defeated, losing nearly half their officers and men.

== Prelude ==
After the execution of Charles I in January 1649, the Scots Covenanters proclaimed his son Charles II king of Scotland. They agreed to restore him to the throne of England, which led to the Third English Civil War; although Oliver Cromwell and the New Model Army won a series of victories over the Scots during the course of 1650, Charles II was crowned at Scone on 1 January 1651.

Oliver Cromwell decided to focus on Scotland, confident his forces in England could deal with any invasion. On 6 August 1651, Charles crossed into England at the head of a predominantly Scottish Royalist army, heading for Lancashire, an area strongly Royalist in sympathy. He reached Worcester on 22 August 1651, where he halted and awaited English reinforcements before pressing on to London.

One of these was a small Royalist contingent of recruits from the Isle of Man and Lancashire commanded by the Earl of Derby. Regular troops under Colonel Robert Lilburne, supported by militia led by Colonel Thomas Birch, were ordered to intercept them before they reached Worcester.

Lilburne with a company of foot from Manchester, two more from Chester, and fifty or sixty dragoons marched to Wigan, where the enemy was gathering, hoping to surprise them but found they had moved off to Chorley. The next day, on hearing the Royalists were at Preston, Lilburne set off in pursuit. He bivouacked within two miles of the town and sent out patrols to harass the enemy. The next afternoon they retaliated. "A party of the enemy's horse fell smartly amongst us, where our horse was grazing, and for some space put us pretty hard to it: but at the last it pleased the Lord to strengthen us, that we put them to the flight, and pursued them to Ribble bridge (this was something like our business at Mussleburg) and killed and took about thirty prisoners."

Lilburne heard Cromwell's regiment of foot was approaching Manchester. Cromwell had detached the regiment with a troop of horse from Rufford Abbey in Nottinghamshire on the 20th or 21st. Lilburne halted by the Ribble, thinking the foot would join him but though it had marched very rapidly as far as Manchester, Cromwell's regiment was now obliged to advance with caution as Royalists were reported to have 500 men in Manchester. In addition, some of Derby's levies were lying between the regiment and Lilburne.

== Battle ==
On the 25th, Lilburne received intelligence that the Earl of Derby was marching towards Wigan and, assuming his force was retreating, gave chase. However, it was Derby's intention to fall on Cromwell's regiment of infantry before Lilburne's cavalry could join it. When Lilburne reached Wigan, he found the enemy in considerable force, both infantry and cavalry, marching out of the town towards Manchester. Having arrived ahead of his own infantry and the terrain surrounding the town consisting of fields and hedges with narrow country lanes unfavourable for cavalry, Lilburne determined to avoid a fight. He instead intended to await infantry reinforcements before flanking the Royalists in Wigan, sending his cavalry around the town to the south while his infantry advanced into the town from the north, encircling and preventing Derby's retreat from the town

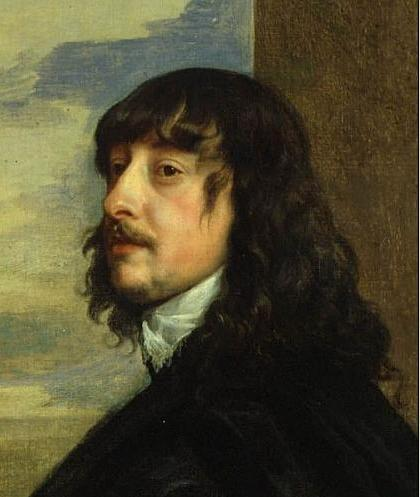
Royalist Commander, the Earl of Derby

Derby, aware of Lilburne's inferiority in strength, wheeled about and marched back through the town, hoping to defeat the Parliamentarian forces piecemeal before they could combine. In spite of the unfavourable nature of the ground, Lilburne decided to make a stand. Lilburne deployed part of his cavalry on Wigan Lane and lined the hedgerows either side of the road with dismounted cavalry, forming a choke point. As the Royalists approached, they were met with a volley of musketry. A fierce fight ensued in the same lanes through which Cromwell had chased the Scots in 1648. Derby divided his cavalry into two equal divisions of 300 men. Derby took command of the vanguard and gave the rear guard command to Sir Thomas Tyldesley. Three times during the day Derby led cavalry charges against the centre of Lilburne's line, breaching but failing to break it. By the third charge, the ranks of the Royalists were severely depleted, and they were overwhelmed by the superior numbers of Lilburne's arriving infantry. After an hour's fighting, the remaining Royalists fled the field.

Lord William Witherington, Sir William Throckmorton, Sir Thomas Tyldesley, Colonel Matthew Boynton and 60 others were killed or died of their wounds, and 400 prisoners were taken. At least one Royalist prisoner, Sir Timothy Fetherstonhaugh, was executed by the Parliamentarians after a court-martial.

Cromwell's regiment, which had advanced to join Lilburne but arrived too late to directly participate in the fighting, picked up many of the stragglers from the rout. Derby escaped badly wounded and joined Charles at Worcester with only 30 horsemen. (Note: Draper, quoting a Robert Lilburne's letter to the Speaker of the House of Commons: A List of the Prisoners taken at Wigan, August 25th, 1651.—Col. Throgmorton, Col Rich. Leg, Col John Robbinson, Col Baynes, Col Ratcliffe Garret, Adjutant General, Lieut.-Col Francis Baynes, Lieut.-Col Galliard, Lieut.-Col Constable, Major Oower, Four Captains, 2 Lieutenants, One Quarter-master, Twenty Gentlemen and Reformadoes, 400 Private Prisoners.—All their Baggage and Sumptures, Armes and Ammunition, the L. Derbies three cloakes with stars, his George, Garter, and other Robes.—Slaine and dead since they were taken :—The L. Witherington, Major-Gen. Sir Thos. Tilsley, Col. Math. Boynton, Major Chester, Major Trollop, and divers others of quality, whose names are not yet brought in, besides 60 private men. Draper noted that Sir Robert Throgmorton, knight-marshal, was left for dead on the field of battle but was taken up by a poor woman and placed under the care of Sir Robert Bradshaw, where he recovered.)

== Aftermath ==
The defeat was a blow to the king as this was the only sizeable English Royalist force to attempt to ride to his standard in Worcester. Without large numbers of English Royalists to support him, his position was untenable and nine days later his predominantly Scottish army of about 15,000 men was decisively beaten at the Battle of Worcester by a Parliamentary army nearly twice the size under the command of Cromwell. This victory brought to an end Third English Civil War and ushered in nine years of republican rule. Charles escaped to France and lived in exile until his return at the Restoration in 1660.

On the Isle of Man, the impact of the Royalist loss was also significant as few of the 170 men conscripted from the local population returned home. David Craine, in Manannan's Isle states that "those who did not fall in the fighting [were] hunted to their death through the countryside." Such a loss was certainly a multiple of the island's normal mortality rate during this period.

== Citations ==
- Baldock, Thomas Stanford (1809), Cromwell as a Soldier, K. Paul, Trench, Trübner & Co.
- Booker, John (1859). A History of the Ancient Chapel of Birch, in Manchester Parish; Volume XLVII. Chetham House.
- Coakley, Frances, ed. (2003). Demographic Crises 1600-1850.
- Craine, D. (1995), Manannan's Isle, The Manx Museum and National Trust, ISBN 978-0-901106-10-0
- Draper, Peter (1864), "Defeat of Charles and Capture of James, Earl of Derby", The house of Stanley; including the soeges of Lathom House with notices of relative and co-temporary incidents, T. Hutton
- Fairfax, Thomas. Memoirs of James Stanley - A description of the memorable sieges and battles in the north of England.
- Firth, Sir Charles; Davies, Godfrey (1940). The Regimental History of Cromwell's Army. Oxford: Clarendon Press.
- Royle, Trevor (2006). Civil War: The Wars of the Three Kingdoms 1638–1660. Abacus. ISBN 978-0-349-11564-1.

== General references ==
- Beamont, William (1864 editor). Remains, Historical and Literary: Connected with the Palatine Counties of Lancaster and Chest Volume 62. Published by Chetham Society.pp. 70–78. Publication of a history written just after the Civil War called Discourse of the Lancashire Warr by Anon, although the Chetham Society surmised it was written by Major Edward Robinson (see preface xxiv-xxx) and it is written from the perspective of an ardent Parliamentarian.
- Morris, Adrian. Report of Wigan Lane by Robert Lilburne, Wigan Archaeological Society. Cites "A History of Wigan" vol II by David Sinclair 1883, Reprinted as "The Battle of Wigan Lane" by Smiths Books 1987
- Sir Thomas Tyldesley 1612-1651, Tyldesley Family History
- Sir Thomas Tyldesley's Regiment of Foote, Being part of The King's Army The English Civil War Society.
- Slingsby, Henry; Hodgson, John (1806) Original memoirs written during the great Civil war, the life of sir H. Slingsby [written by himself] and memoirs of capt. Hodgson, with notes [by sir W. Scott. Followed by] Relations of the campaigns of Oliver Cromwell in Scotland, 1650, Arch. Constable and Co. Edinburgh, and John Murray, 32 Fleet-Street, London. p. 152,153. Account by an Officer in Cromwell's own regiment.
- Wyke, Terry (2004). Public Sculpture of Greater Manchester, Liverpool University Press, ISBN 0-85323-567-8 Page 425 "Wigan Lane Tyldesley Monument"
