= Ralph Widdrington (politician) =

English Tory politician

Ralph Widdrington (c. 1640 – 22 June 1718) was an English Army officer and Tory politician. A supporter of James II of England, he lost his public offices following the Glorious Revolution of 1688.

== Early life and military career ==
Widdrington was one of the eight sons (10 children) of William Widdrington, 1st Baron Widdrington and his wife, Mary (née Thorold). He was educated at Blankney Grammar School and Christ's College, Cambridge, being admitted to the university on 28 April 1657. In 1659, he entered Gray's Inn to train in law.

He was commissioned Ensign in the Earl of Ogle's regiment in 1667, his brothers Edward and Roger being commissioned in the same regiment at the same time. Burke's (extinct) Peerage states, following earlier genealogies, that he lost his sight in "the Dutch War" without stating which one. In the light of Widdrington's subsequent career, that seems unlikely; The Earl of Ogle's regiment is not recorded as in action in the 1665–1667 War and, in 1671, Ralph Widdrington was commissioned Captain in the Portsmouth garrison company.

Thereafter, he was at Berwick garrison as Lieutenant to the Duke of Newcastle. Captain George Carleton's memoirs go further and state that Widdrington lost his life at the Siege of Maastricht in 1676, as a volunteer in the Dutch Army. Ralph may have been a volunteer in the Dutch Army then, although that is uncertain, but it was his brother Roger Widdrington who was killed at Maastricht.

By 1679, owing to his military service, Widdrington was a servant in the household of James, Duke of York. Between 1677 and 1689, he was a justice of the peace for Northumberland. He was also a deputy lieutenant for the county between 1680 and 1689, and for Newcastle upon Tyne in 1688.

== Political career ==
In 1679, Widdrington stood for election in Northumberland as the candidate of the Duke of York; he was defeated in face of opposition from Sir Ralph Delaval, 1st Baronet, supported by Sir John Fenwick, 3rd Baronet. Fenwick opposed Widdrington's candidacy because he was "not qualified... and a reputed Papist". As a significant figure in Berwick, Widdrington subsequently quarreled often with Fenwick and led a minority faction opposed to Fenwick on the local corporation.

In 1685, he became Member of Parliament for Berwick upon Tweed and remained so until parliament's dissolution in 1687. Immediately prior to King Charles' death (in February, 1685) the town of Berwick, convinced by William Ogle, had petitioned for a new Charter, and There was present at the delivery Captain Ralph Widdrington and Captain Biggerstaffe, but they stood aside and were taken noe notice of. However, they two are the towne's irreconcileable enemies, and they endeavour to have the Charter so drawn that all the towne's grounds may be given to the garrison, and that all the burgesses be no burgesses, and only a certain number as they please to name to be inserted in the new Charter, and these only to be burgesses, and impose a parcel of justices of peace upon the town, etc..

According to that narrative, all of the aldermen and officers of the town, and seven score burgesses and inhabitants were removed from the voter list. In that manner, Ralph Widdrington and Philip Bickerstaffe were returned to Parliament. Widdrington probably never took his seat, and he was replaced as commander of the Berwick garrison by an avowed Roman Catholic in 1687. During the Glorious Revolution of 1688, he appealed to the English Dissenters of Newcastle for support in defending Tynemouth for James II, but met with no response. Widdrington was removed from all offices in 1688/9, and fled overseas.

In 1693, he returned to England, and he and his wife were among the former Jacobites who were granted permission to remain. He does not appear to have taken an active role in politics or in Jacobite activities after his return. Members of his family – William, 4th Baron and his brothers Charles and Peregrine – took part in the Jacobite rising of 1715 for which the Widdrington family was attaindered as Catholic and Jacobite. Widdrington himself was recorded as being a Catholic nonjuror in 1715. He died in London in 1718 and was buried in Blankney.

Parliament of England
Preceded by John Rushworth; Ralph Grey	Member of Parliament for Berwick-upon-Tweed; 1685–1687; With: Philip Bickerstaffe	Succeeded by Francis Blake; Philip Babington
