= Bewcastle Castle =

Castle in Cumbria, England

- Bewcastle, Cumbria, England
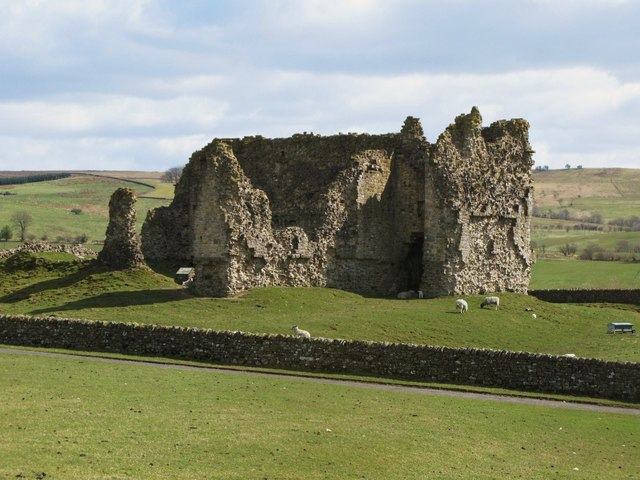
- Bewcastle Castle

Site information
- Condition: Ruined

Location
- Shown within Cumbria
- Coordinates: 55.0649°N 2.6811°W
- Grid reference: grid reference NY566747

Site history
- Materials: Stone
- Events: English Civil War

Bewcastle Castle is a ruined castle in the parish of Bewcastle in the English county of Cumbria, a few miles from the Scottish border.

== History ==
The first castle was built on the site of Bewcastle Roman Fort, around 1092. The castle is surrounded by a dry moat, the north and east sections of which re-use the Roman ditch. The castle was destroyed in 1173, but was rebuilt towards the end of the 14th century. It was decayed by the early 15th century when Edward IV granted it to his brother, the Duke of Gloucester, who later became King Richard III. The buildings were repaired and the gatehouse was possibly added at this time. From the late 15th century, the Musgrave family held the castle, and repairs were made in 1540s by Sir William Musgrave.

In May 1599, Henry Widdrington described how a football match had been arranged at Bewcastle as an occasion to capture the Armstrongs of Whitehaugh. The Armstrongs heard of the ambush and made a surprise attack. In 1602, Thomas Musgrave was accused by Lancelot Carleton to the Privy Council of harbouring thieves in the castle. They fought a duel at Canonbie Holm to settle the issue.

Bewcastle Castle was reputedly destroyed by Cromwell in the 1640s. The castle was in a state of ruin by the 17th century, and although much of the stone was removed for nearby buildings, much of the gatehouse with its internal garderobe still remains.

The element "castle" in the place-name Bewcastle probably refers to the Roman fort within which it was built, giving rise to the unusual repetition of the word in the castle name. However, the Ordnance Survey gives the name as Bew Castle.

== Gallery ==
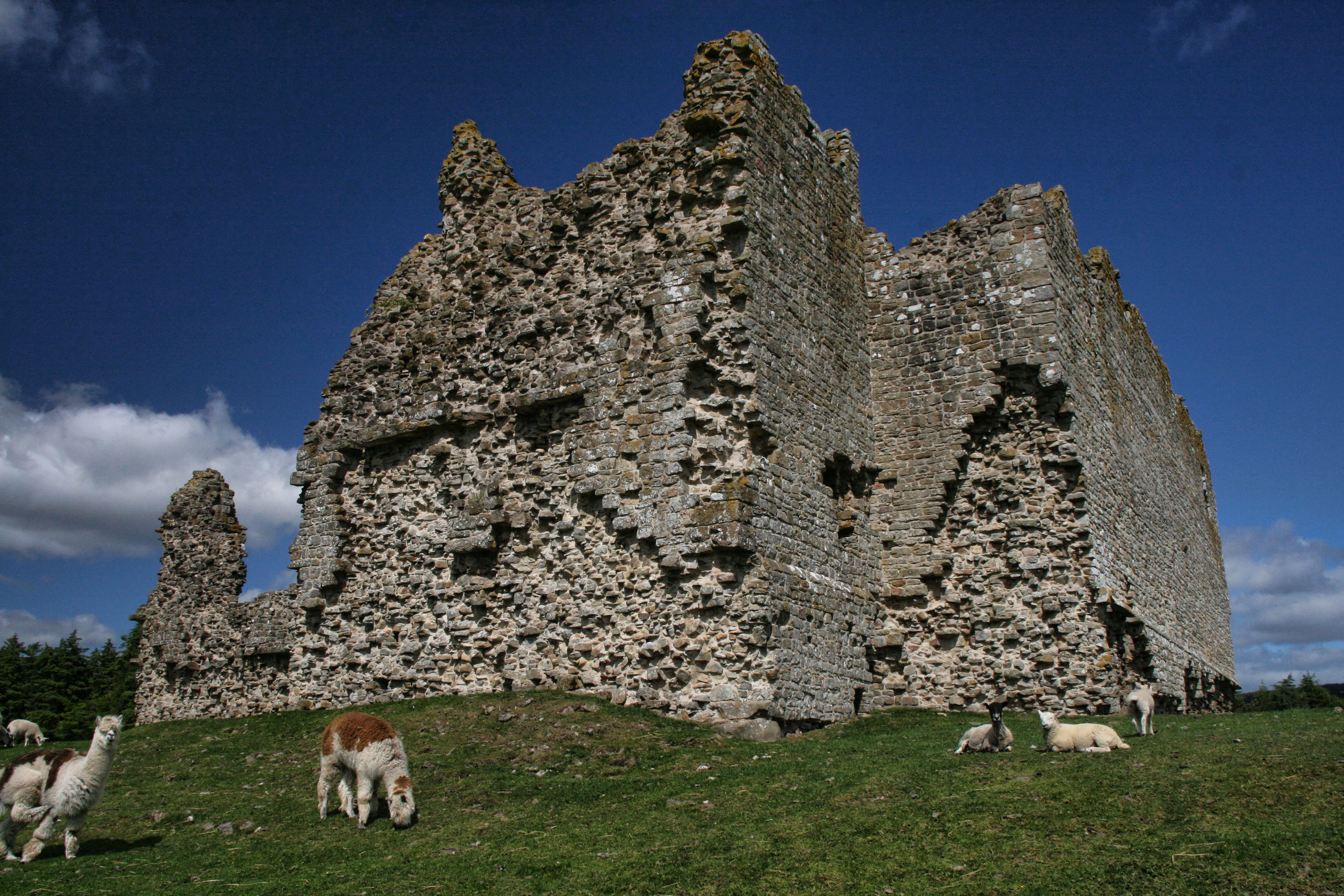
Bewcastle castle

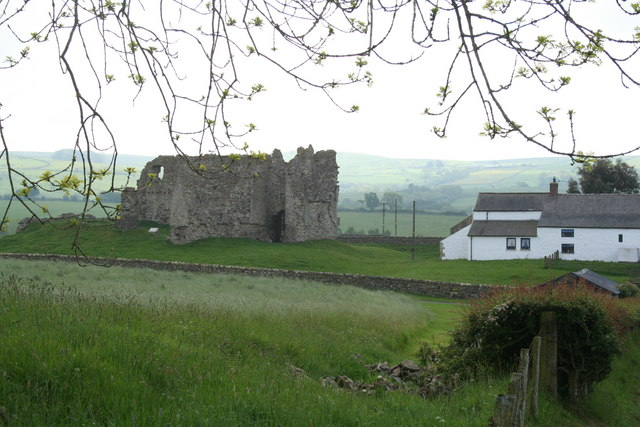
The castle

== See also ==
- Castles in Great Britain and Ireland
- List of castles in England
