= Baron Widdrington =

William Widdrington, 4th Baron Widdrington.

Baron Widdrington, of Blankney in the County of Lincoln, was a title in the Peerage of England. It was created on 2 November 1643 for Sir William Widdrington, 1st Baronet. He had already been created a baronet, of Widdrington in the County of Northumberland, in the Baronetage of England on 9 July 1642. The Widdringtons were an ancient Northumbrian family who gave their name to (or took their name from) the village, near Morpeth, Northumberland. In the 17th century the family were strongly Royalist. William Widdrington, 4th Baron Widdrington, joined Derwentwater and other Northumberland families in the Jacobite rising of 1715 and (together with his brothers Charles and Peregrine) was captured at the Battle of Preston (1715). As a consequence of the subsequent attainder of the brothers, the Widdrington estates were sequestered and sold by the Crown, and the title was forfeited. Of their three great houses no traces now remain: Widdrington Castle was demolished in 1862 (although the site is designated as a Scheduled Ancient Monument); Stella Hall, Blaydon on Tyne, was demolished in 1954; and Blankney Hall, Lincolnshire suffered the same fate in 1960. Some of the family paintings passed to the Cook/Widdrington family of Newton Hall, and those were auctioned by Christie’s in 2010. The important collection of family portraits passed into the possession of the Towneley family through Mary Widdrington, daughter of the third Baron (who married Richard Towneley). These were sold at various auctions after Towneley Hall was emptied in about 1902. A few have since been donated to Towneley Hall, and (at least) four were donated to Stonyhurst College in the 19th century.

Edward Widdrington, cousin of the first Baron, was created a baronet in both 1635 and 1642 (see Widdrington baronets).

== Barons Widdrington (1643) ==
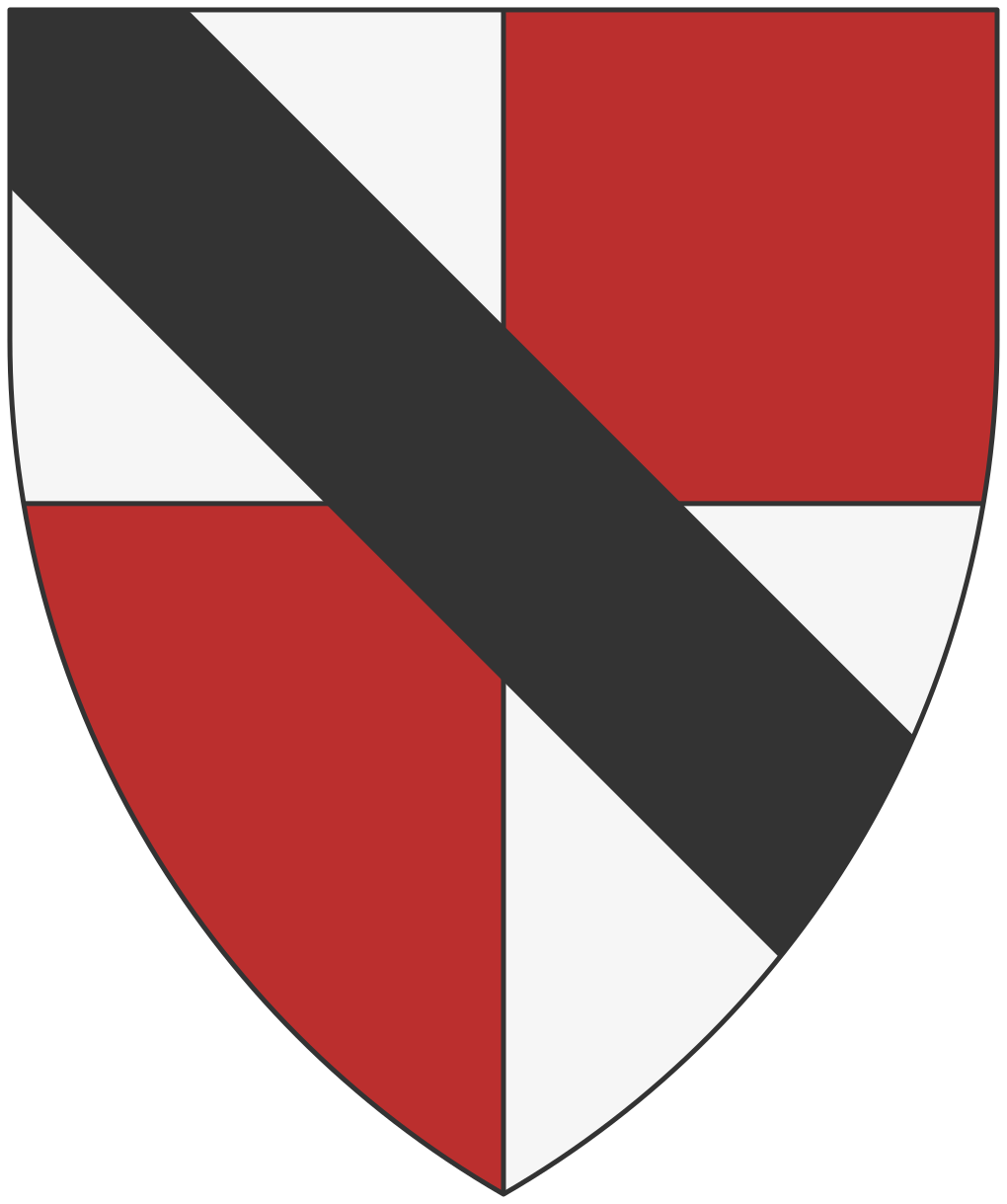
Arms of Widdrington, Baron Widdrington

- William Widdrington, 1st Baron Widdrington (1610–1651)
- William Widdrington, 2nd Baron Widdrington (died 1675)
- William Widdrington, 3rd Baron Widdrington (1656–1695)
- William Widdrington, 4th Baron Widdrington (1678–1743) (forfeited 1716)

== Other Widdringtons ==
- Thomas Widdrington (died 1664)
- Ralph Widdrington (died 1688)
- Ralph Widdrington (1640–1718)
