= William Widdrington, 1st Baron Widdrington =

English landowner and politician

William Widdrington, 1st Baron Widdrington (11 July 1610 – 3 September 1651) was an English landowner and politician who sat in the House of Commons from 1640 to 1642 and was created a peer in 1643. He fought in the Royalist army in the English Civil War and was killed in battle in 1651.

== Biography ==
Widdrington was born on 11 July 1610, the son and heir of Sir Henry Widdrington of Widdrington, Northumberland and his wife Mary Curwen, daughter of Sir Nicholas Curwen.

Knighted in 1632, he was appointed High Sheriff of Northumberland in 1636. He was then elected Member of Parliament for Northumberland in both the Short and the Long Parliaments of 1640 to 1642, but in August 1642 he was expelled for taking up arms in support of Charles I.

During the Civil War he fought for the King chiefly in Yorkshire and Lincolnshire and on 9 July 1642 was rewarded for his loyalty to the Crown by creation as 1st Baronet Widdrington of Widdrington. He served as governor of Lincoln in 1643, and on 2 November 1643 was elevated to the Peerage as 1st Baron Widdrington of Blankney.

In 1644, after helping to defend York, and the Kings defeat at Marston Moor he left England with the Duke of Newcastle for exile in Hamburg.

In 1648, he was condemned to death in his absence by the House of Commons and his estates were confiscated. He returned in 1650 when he accompanied Charles II to Scotland and in 1651 he was mortally wounded while fighting for him at Wigan.

== Family ==
In 1629 Widdrington married Mary, daughter and heiress of Anthony Thorold of Blankney Hall, Blankney, near Lincoln. They had eight sons and two daughters including:

- William Widdrington, 2nd Baron Widdrington (died 1675) first son; had issue.
- Edward, who married Elizabeth, daughter and heiress of Sir Thomas Horseley, of Long Horseley, Northumberland. They had at least one daughter Teresa who married William, Wheler, 3rd Baronet.
- Jane, married Sir Charles Stanley, K.B., nephew of the Lord Derby.
- Ralph Widdrington (MP) (c. 1640–1718)

== Arms ==
Coat of arms of William Widdrington, 1st Baron Widdrington
Crest On a Chapeau Gules turned up Ermine a Bull's Head Sable spotted Argent Escutcheon Quarterly Argent and Gules, a bend Sable Supporters On either side a White Buck proper powdered with Ermine Spots Sable attired Or

== Sources ==
- Hunter-Blair, C H, ed. (1843). "The Sheriffs of Northumberland". Archaeologia Aeliana: Or, Miscellaneous Tracts Relating to Antiquities. Society of Antiquaries of Newcastle upon Tyne. p. 8.
- Bennett, Martyn (January 2008). "Widdrington, William, first Baron Widdrington (1610–1651)". Oxford Dictionary of National Biography (online ed.). Oxford University Press. doi:10.1093/ref:odnb/29359. (Subscription, Wikipedia Library access or UK public library membership required.)
- Betham, William (1802). "I. Sir William Wheler". The Baronetage of England. Vol. 2. Burrell and Bransby. p. 160.
- Herbert, John Alexander (1900). "Widdrington, William (1610-1651)" . In Lee, Sidney (ed.). Dictionary of National Biography. Vol. 61. London: Smith, Elder & Co. pp. 184–185.
- Chisholm, Hugh, ed. (1911). "Widdrington, Barons" . Encyclopædia Britannica. Vol. 28 (11th ed.). Cambridge University Press. p. 620.

Peerage of England
New creation	Baron Widdrington; 1643–1651	Succeeded by William Widdrington
Baronetage of England
New creation	Baronet (of Widdrington); 1642–1651	Succeeded by William Widdrington
