= Blankney =

Village and civil parish in the North Kesteven district of Lincolnshire, England

Coordinates: 53.128385°N 0.405785°W

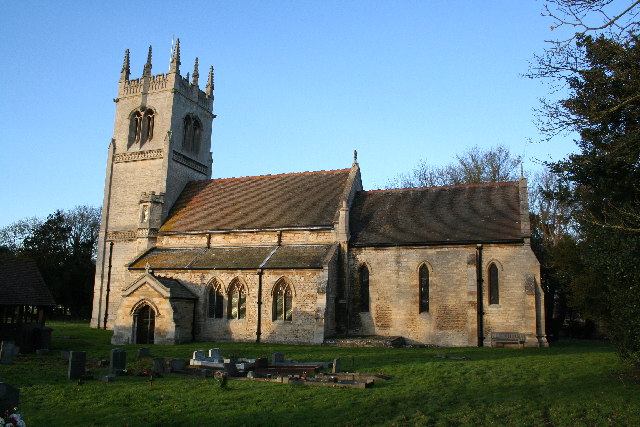
- Church of St Oswald, Blankney

- Location within Lincolnshire
- Population: 261 (2021)
- OS grid reference: TF067602
  - London: 110 mi (180 km) S
- Unitary authority: North Kesteven
- Ceremonial county: Lincolnshire
- Region: East Midlands
- Country: England
- Sovereign state: United Kingdom
- Post town: Lincoln
- Postcode district: LN4
- Police: Lincolnshire
- Fire: Lincolnshire
- Ambulance: East Midlands
- UK Parliament: Sleaford and North Hykeham (UK Parliament constituency)

Blankney is a village and civil parish in the North Kesteven district of Lincolnshire, England. The population of the civil parish at the 2011 census was 251. The village is situated approximately 9 miles (14 km) south from the city and county town of Lincoln and 9 miles north from Sleaford.

Blankney is a small stone-built estate village, built around the large estate of Blankney Hall.

According to the 2021 census, the population was 261.

== History ==
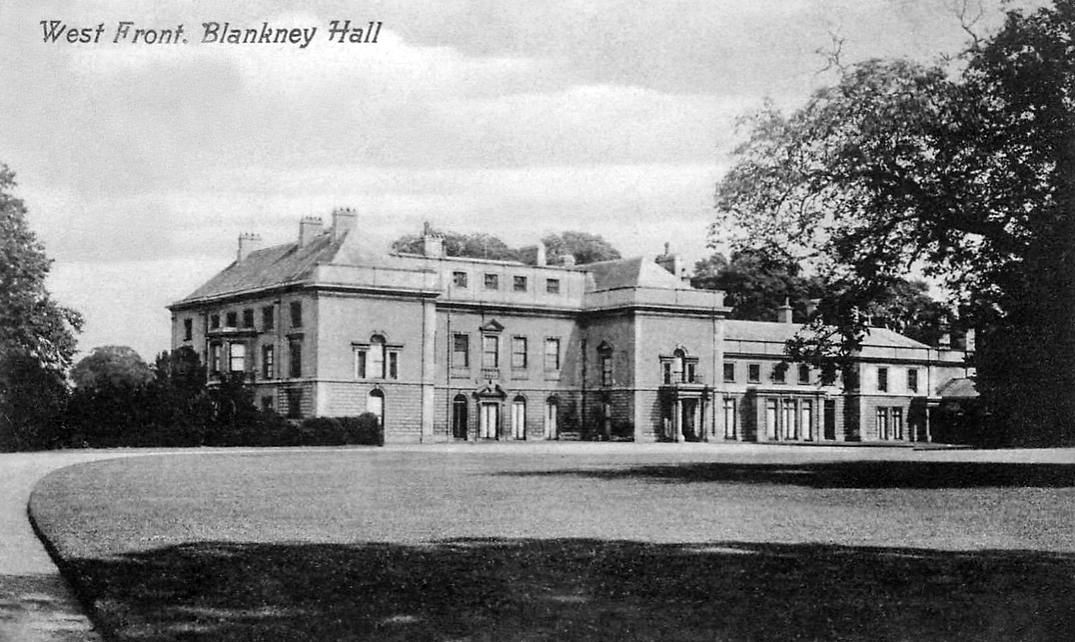
Blankney Hall c.1909 (demolished in the 1960s)

Blankney has existed at least since the time of William the Conqueror, when it belonged to the major land-owner Walter D'Aincourt. Walter reinforced his connection to England by marrying Matilda, a granddaughter of Harold Godwinson by his eldest daughter Gunhild of Wessex.

The place-name 'Blankney' is first attested in the Domesday Book of 1086, where it appears as Blachene. It is listed as Blancaneia in 1157 in Early Yorkshire Charters, and as Blankenei in 1202 in the Assize Rolls. The name is the Old English blancan ēg, thought to mean 'Blanca's island'.

In the 15th century the estate passed through marriage to the Lovels of Titchmarsh. After the Battle of Stoke Field in 1487, all the estates of the Lovels were confiscated by Henry VII for the crown, and the Blankney Estate was then bought by the Thorold family. It was the Thorolds who did much to embellish the house with carved panelling of the period.

During the reign of Charles I, again through marriage it passed into the hands of Sir William Widdrington who was created Baron Widdrington of Blankney in 1643. Lord Widdrington's great-grandson, William Widdrington, 4th Baron Widdrington had the indiscretion to take part in the Jacobite rising of 1715. He was captured at Preston, convicted of high treason and his lands were confiscated in the following year.

In 1719 Thomas Chaplin, a prominent Lincolnshire landowner, purchased the land from the Crown Commissioners for Confiscated Land, and it was to remain in the family for over two centuries. The estate owes its appearance largely to the influence of the Chaplins and their care of the land. The last Chaplin, Henry, led an extravagant lifestyle and had political ambitions; this lifestyle coupled to the falling revenues from farms led him ever into debt until finally in 1892, the estate passed to the principal mortgagee William Denison, 1st Earl of Londesborough.

At the start of the Second World War the Hall was requisitioned for use as billets for servicemen from nearby RAF stations. During 1945 it was badly damaged by fire and was then left as an empty shell before being demolished in the 1960s. All that remains today are the dilapidated remnants of the former stable block.

== Golf ==
Unusually, the Hall was not built within its park, the park being on the opposite side of the village's main road. Although part of the park has been lost to arable farming, much of it remains as a golf course. The course was first laid out over 9 holes in 1902 by the 2nd Earl of Londesborough, in all probability at this stage for the use of himself and his guests, but in 1904 Blankney Golf Club was formed to manage the course, which it continues to do today. In 1938 it was decided to extend the course to 18 holes, and this extended course came into play at the start of the 1940 season. According to Golfshake.com, it is in the top 10 of the best golf courses in Lincolnshire. Players across Lincolnshire can record their progress on Blankney Golf Course in the Union of Golf Clubs analysis page.

In November 2023, Blankney Estates' YouTube channel published a promotional video with the tagline "Play The Blankney Way", where they promote their on-site "pro shop" and bar, as well as "prestigious championships."

== Cricket ==
Blankney Cricket Club was originally formed in 1873, playing on a site in the centre of the village; it continued to flourish into the 20th century under the patronage of Lord Londesborough, who used to watch the matches from the north wing of Blankney Hall. However, after the end of the Second World War in 1945, the club went into decline and closed a few years later. In 1988 the Cricket Club was re-formed on the same site, the ground was developed, and a new clubhouse was built, opening in 1991. The club still runs today and posts updates on social media.

== Old coach-road ==
The Old Coach-Road was constructed from the Hall to Metheringham railway station (then called Blankney and Metheringham station) 1.2 miles (2 km) away, around the beginning of the 20th century by Lord Londesborough. It was run through woodland both existing and newly planted, and where it crossed the Blankney to Martin road, a bridge with high parapets was built to take the road over the coach-road. It was probably constructed to allow the Earl's visitors, in particular the Prince of Wales (the future King Edward VII) who used the Hall as a discreet retreat for his amorous adventures, to arrive and depart without being seen by the local populace. This coach-road still exists although it is private.

== Parish church ==
At the south end of the village is the parish church dedicated to St Oswald. The church, which was restored twice during the 19th century, has a tomb-slab to John de Glori with a bearded head looking out of a cusped opening, and a sculpture by Joseph Boehm of Lady Florence Chaplin.

== See also ==
- Blankney Hunt
