= Ralph Widdrington (academic) =

Ralph Widdrington (died 1688) was Regius Professor of Greek at Cambridge University.

He was a member of a junior branch of an ancient Northumbrian family and was distantly related to William, Lord Widdrington. He was a younger brother of Sir Thomas Widdrington and Henry Widdrington.

He was educated at Christ's College, Cambridge, where he made the acquaintance of John Milton. In 1654, he was appointed Regius Professor of Greek and in 1673, Lady Margaret's Professor of Divinity.
