= William Widdrington, 4th Baron Widdrington =

English peer

The Right Honourable The Lord Widdrington
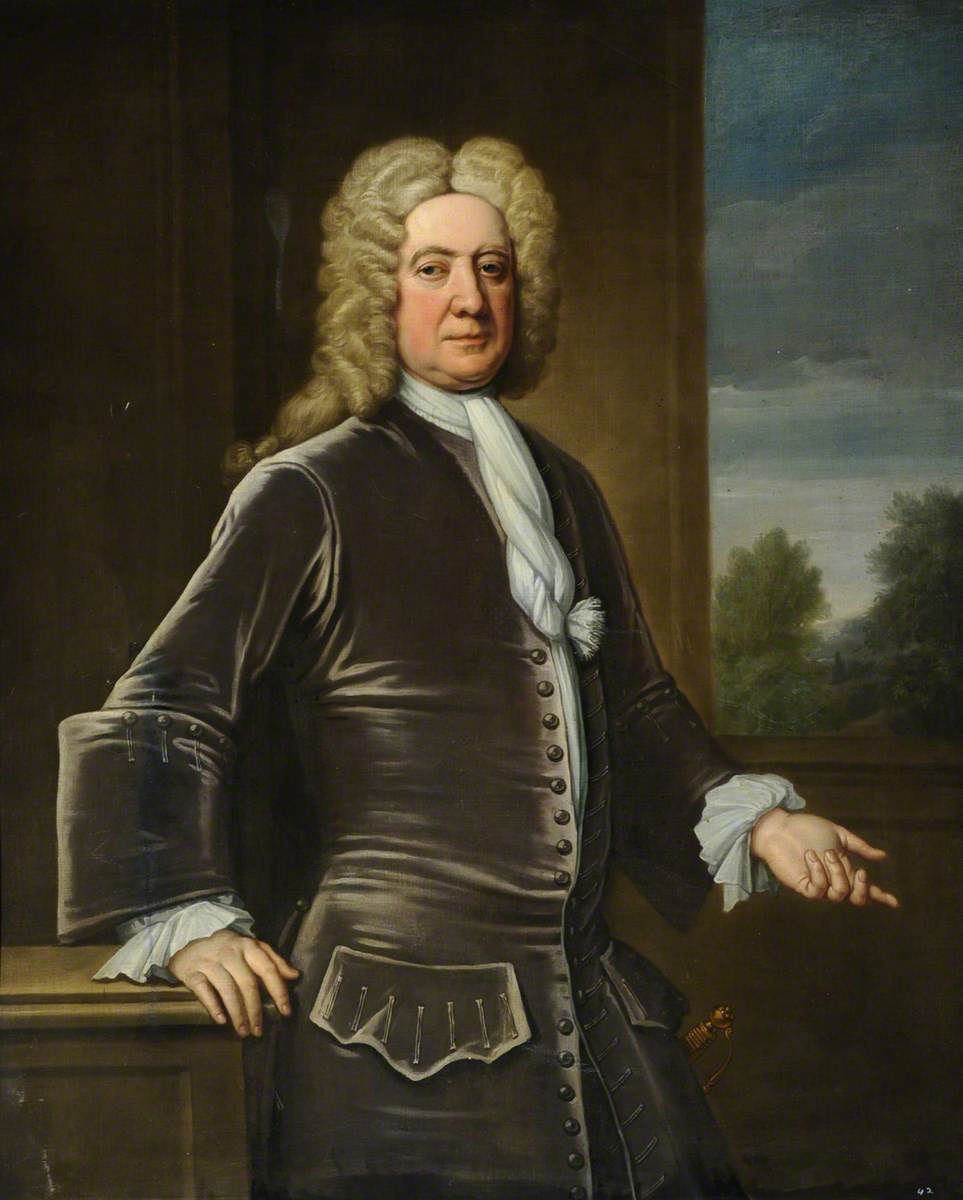
- Born: 1678; England
- Died: 19 April 1743 (aged 64 – 65); England

William Widdrington, 4th Baron Widdrington (1678 – 19 April 1743) was an English peer who was stripped of his titles by the Crown for being involved in the Jacobite rising of 1715.

== Background ==
Widdrington was the son of William Widdrington, 3rd Baron Widdrington, by the Honourable Alethea Fairfax, daughter of Charles Fairfax, 5th Viscount Fairfax of Emley, and succeeded to his father's title and estates in 1695. His family was staunchly Roman Catholic and he was educated at a Jesuit college in Paris. He became a supporter of the Stuart claim to the Crowns of England, Scotland, and Ireland.

== Political activity ==
Widdrington took part in the Jacobite rising of 1715, and with two of his brothers was taken prisoner after the Battle of Preston. Along with Henry Oxburgh he counselled the commander of the English rising Thomas Forster to seek what terms he could from the army commander Charles Wills. He was convicted of high treason and condemned to death, but was reprieved after an intervention by his wife, Catherine Graham.

Although his title and estates were forfeited, he was not executed and was allowed to retire to Bath.

== Family ==
Widdrington married Jane Tempest in 1700 and resided at the property she brought, Stella Hall, Blaydon-on-Tyne, near Newcastle. Jane died in 1714, and in 1718 he married Catherine Graham, the daughter of Richard Graham, 1st Viscount Preston. In 1739, Catherine and her sister Mary inherited the estate at Nunnington Hall, Yorkshire, from their nephew Charles, third and last Viscount Preston, who died without issue.

After Widdrington's death on 19 April 1743, he was interred in his wife's family vault at Nunnington parish church. A memorial tablet was erected, commemorating his life and virtues; it refers to his part in the Jacobite rising by speaking obliquely of 'the affair at Preston'. When his son Henry Francis Widdrington, who claimed the barony, died in September 1774, this branch of the family appears to have become extinct.

His brother Peregrine and sister-in-law Maria, Duchess of Norfolk, were both staunch Jacobites as well.

== Notes ==
Peerage of England
Preceded by William Widdrington	Baron Widdrington; 1695–1716	Peerage forfeited
