= Belsay =

Village in Northumberland, England

Coordinates: 55.101°N 1.841°W

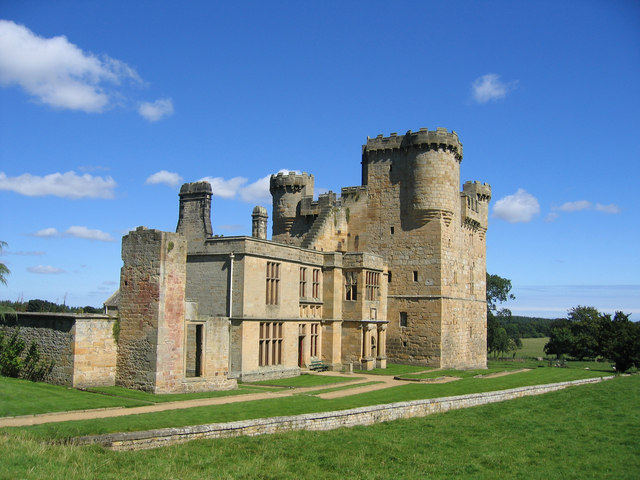
- Belsay Castle

- Location within Northumberland
- Population: 436 (2001)
- OS grid reference: NZ101786
- Civil parish: Belsay
- Unitary authority: Northumberland
- Ceremonial county: Northumberland
- Region: North East
- Country: England
- Sovereign state: United Kingdom
- Post town: NEWCASTLE UPON TYNE
- Postcode district: NE20
- Dialling code: 01661
- Police: Northumbria
- Fire: Northumberland
- Ambulance: North East
- UK Parliament: Hexham

Belsay is a village and civil parish in Northumberland, England. The village is about 5 miles (10 km) from Ponteland on the A696, which links the village with Newcastle upon Tyne and Jedburgh. The population of the civil parish was 436 at the 2001 census, increasing to 518 at the 2011 Census.

Scottish nobleman and doctor, John de Strivelyn, was granted the manor around 1340 by Edward III. On his death, the estate passed to his daughter Christiana, who was married to Sir John Middleton, and it has remained with the Middleton family ever since.

Belsay was formerly a township in the parish of Bolam, in 1866 Belsay became a civil parish. Belsay parish includes the former parishes of Bitchfield, Black Heddon, Bolam, Bolam Vicarage, Bradford, Gallowhill, Harnham, Newham, Shortflatt, Trewick, and Wallridge which were merged with Belsay on 1 April 1955.

Belsay is home to Belsay Castle, a fine medieval castle, and to Belsay Hall.

== Landmarks ==
Belsay Castle is a 14th-century medieval castle situated at Belsay. It is a Scheduled Ancient Monument and a Grade I listed building.

The main structure, a three-storey rectangular pele tower with rounded turrets and battlements, was constructed about 1370, and was the home of the Middleton family. In 1614, Thomas Middleton built a new manor house attached to the tower. A west wing was added in 1711 but was largely demolished in 1872 by Sir Arthur Middleton when the remainder of the house was considerably altered.

The castle was abandoned as a residence by the family in the early 19th century when Sir Charles Monck built Belsay Hall close by.

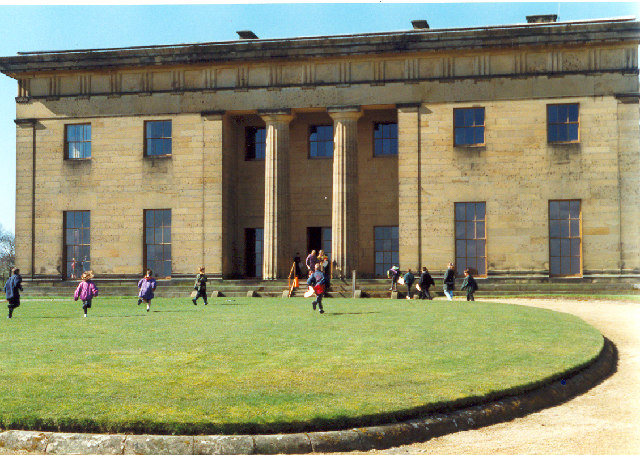
Belsay Hall

Belsay Hall is a 19th-century country mansion and a Grade I listed building. The house was built between 1810 and 1817 for Sir Charles Monck (then of Belsay Castle close by). Sir Charles himself was the designer of the building. It is a notable early classical building. The house measures 100 feet (30 m) square with a lower kitchen wing attached to the north side. It is in two storeys. The hall was the residence of the Middleton family until 1962.

Belsay Castle and Belsay Hall are administered by English Heritage and are open the public.

15th-century Bitchfield Tower and Shortflatt Tower are in the parish.

Aruna Ratanagiri, a Buddhist monastery of the Thai Forest Tradition, lies on a hilltop 3 miles (4.8 km) to the north-west of Belsay, in the hamlet of Harnham.
