= Sir William Middleton, 5th Baronet =

British soldier and politician

Sir William Middleton 5th Baronet (1738–1795), was a British soldier and politician who sat in the House of Commons from 1774 to 1795.

Middleton was the son of Sir John Lambert Middleton, 4th Baronet of Belsay Castle, a former merchant, and his wife Anne Perkins, a widow and daughter of Sir Nathaniel Hodges, and was born on 6 June 1738. He joined the Royal Horse Guards and was Cornet in 1756 and Lieutenant in 1759. He was severely wounded at the Battle of Minden on 1 August 1759, and was left lame for life. In 1762 he became captain. He succeeded his father in the baronetcy on 2 March 1768 and retired from the army in 1774. He married Jane Monck, daughter of Lawrence Monck of Caenby, Lincolnshire on 20 April 1774,

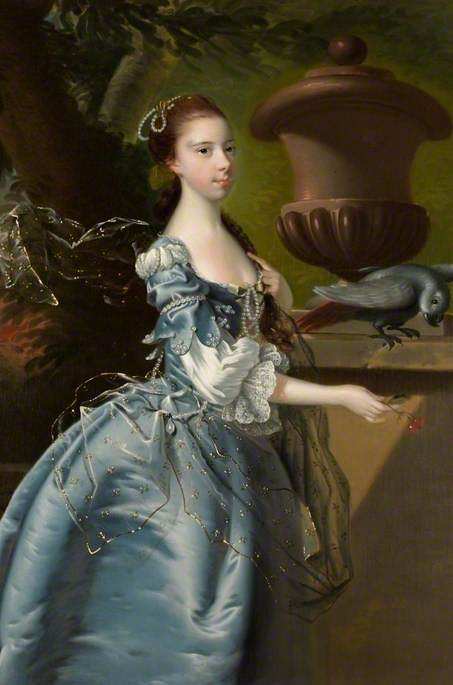
Miss Jane Monck (later Lady Middleton), painting by Joseph Wright of Derby, 1760

In 1774 Middleton was elected as Member of Parliament for Northumberland in a contested election when he came second in the poll. He promised to act an independent and disinterested part in Parliament and generally did so. He was re-elected in 1780, 1784 and 1790. He is reported as attending parliament infrequently and never spoke.

Middleton died on 7 July 1795.

Parliament of Great Britain
Preceded by George Shafto Delaval; Sir Edward Blackett	Member of Parliament for Northumberland; 1774–1795; With: Lord Algernon Percy 1774-1786; Hon. Charles Grey 1786-1795	Succeeded by Hon. Charles Grey; Thomas Richard Beaumont
Baronetage of England
Preceded by John Lambert Middleton	Baronet (of Belsay Castle); 1769-1795	Succeeded by Charles Middleton
