= Belsay Hall =

Country house museum in Northumberland, England

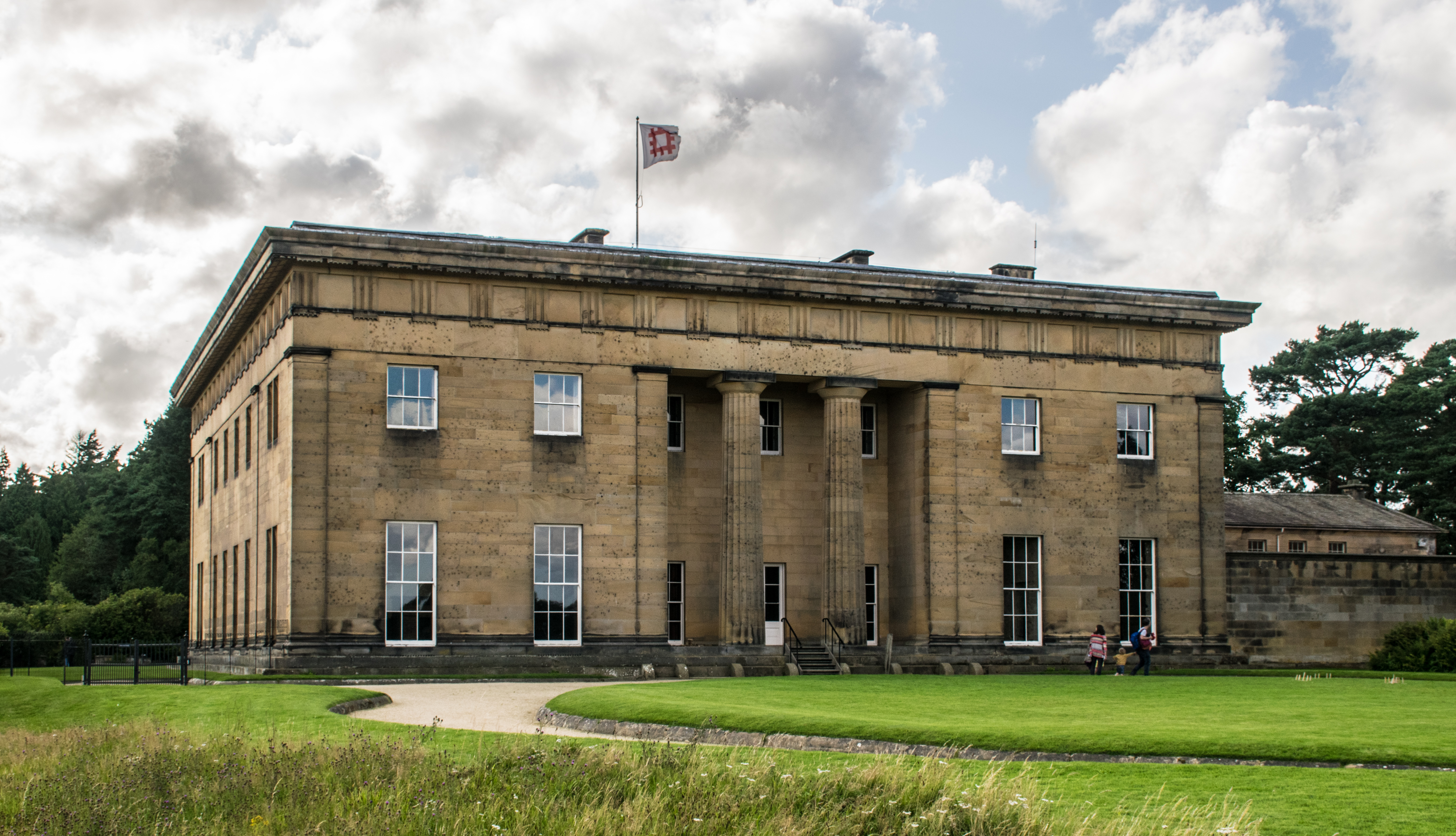

- Location within Northumberland
- 55°05′59″N 1°51′52″W
- Type: Country house
- Location: Belsay
- OS grid reference: NZ087783

History
- Built: 1810-1817

Site notes
- Area: Northumberland
- Architect: Sir Charles Monck
- Architectural style: Greek Revival
- Owner: English Heritage

Listed Building – Grade I
- Official name: Belsay Hall
- Designated: 27 Aug 1952
- Reference no.: 1304489

National Register of Historic Parks and Gardens
- Official name: Belsay Hall
- Designated: 1 January 1985
- Reference no.: 1001042

Belsay Hall is a Regency style country house located at Belsay, Northumberland. It is regarded as the first British country house to be built entirely in the new Greek Revival style. It is a Grade I listed building. It was built to supersede Belsay Castle and its adjoining earlier hall just a few hundred yards away, and is part of the same estate.

== History ==
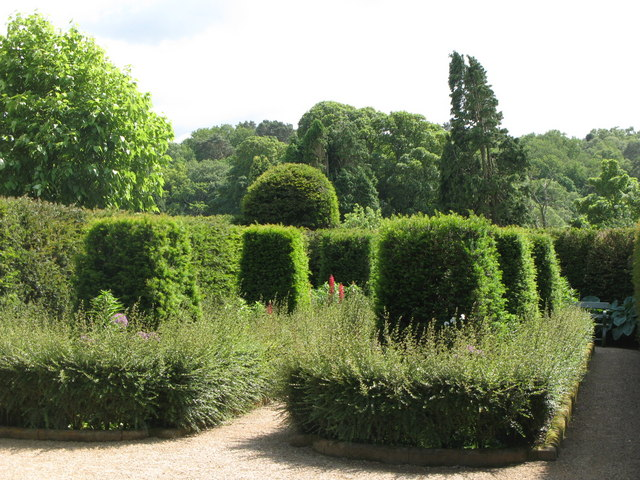
The Yew Garden, Belsay Hall.

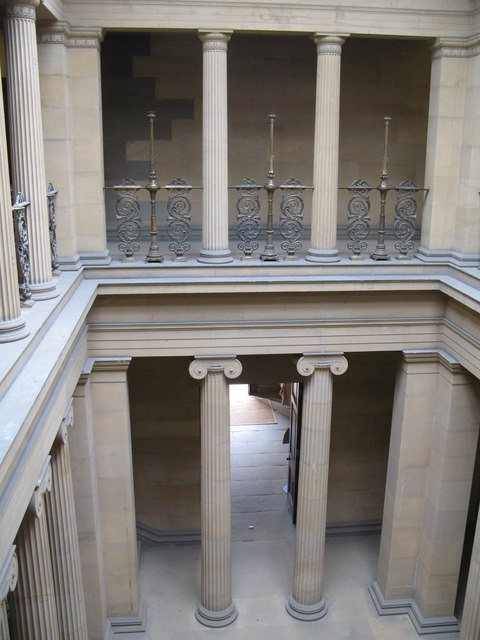
Pillar Hall atrium, Belsay Hall.

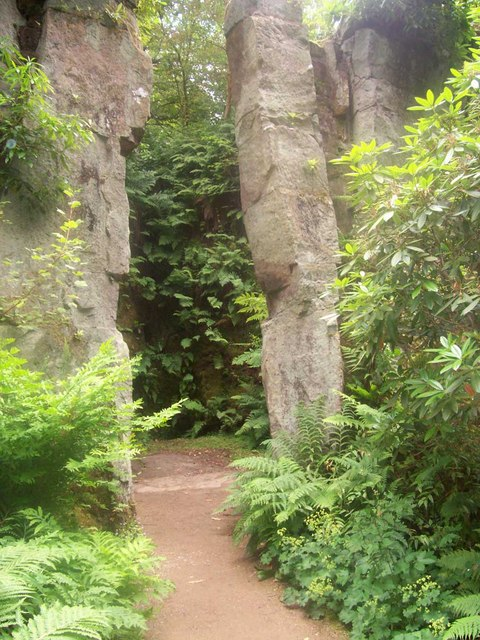
Quarry Garden, Belsay Hall.

The house was built between 1810 and 1817 for Sir Charles Monck (then of Belsay Castle close by) to his own design, possibly assisted by architect John Dobson. It is built in ashlar with a Lakeland slate roof in the Greek Doric style. Monck modelled his design on the style of buildings he had seen during his two-year honeymoon in Greece, particularly the Temple of Hephaestus in Athens.

The house measures 100 feet (30 m) square, with a lower kitchen wing attached to the north side. Externally the house appears to have two stories, although there is an additional storey hidden within the roof space to provide servant accommodation.

This service side of the house was badly affected by dry rot in the 1970s and, following remedial work, it was left as a weather-proof shell to illustrate how the house was built. The hall was the residence of the Middleton family until 1962.

== Present day ==
The entire Belsay Hall house is unfurnished and maintained in a condition of benign decay, with only necessary structural maintenance undertaken. This allows it to be used as a setting for bespoke art installations each summer.

There are extensive gardens, formal and naturalistic, such as the linear Quarry Garden. There is wheelchair access to the Quarry Garden, the ground floor of both the Hall and the Castle, and to the café. The gardens are also Grade I listed on the Historic England Park and Garden Register.

Belsay Hall is administered by English Heritage and is open to the public.

In 2023 English Heritage completed a two-year conservation project has included a new roof for the hall and substantial work on the gardens.
