= Hugh Percy, 3rd Duke of Northumberland =

British aristocrat and Tory politician

His Grace The Duke of Northumberland KG PC
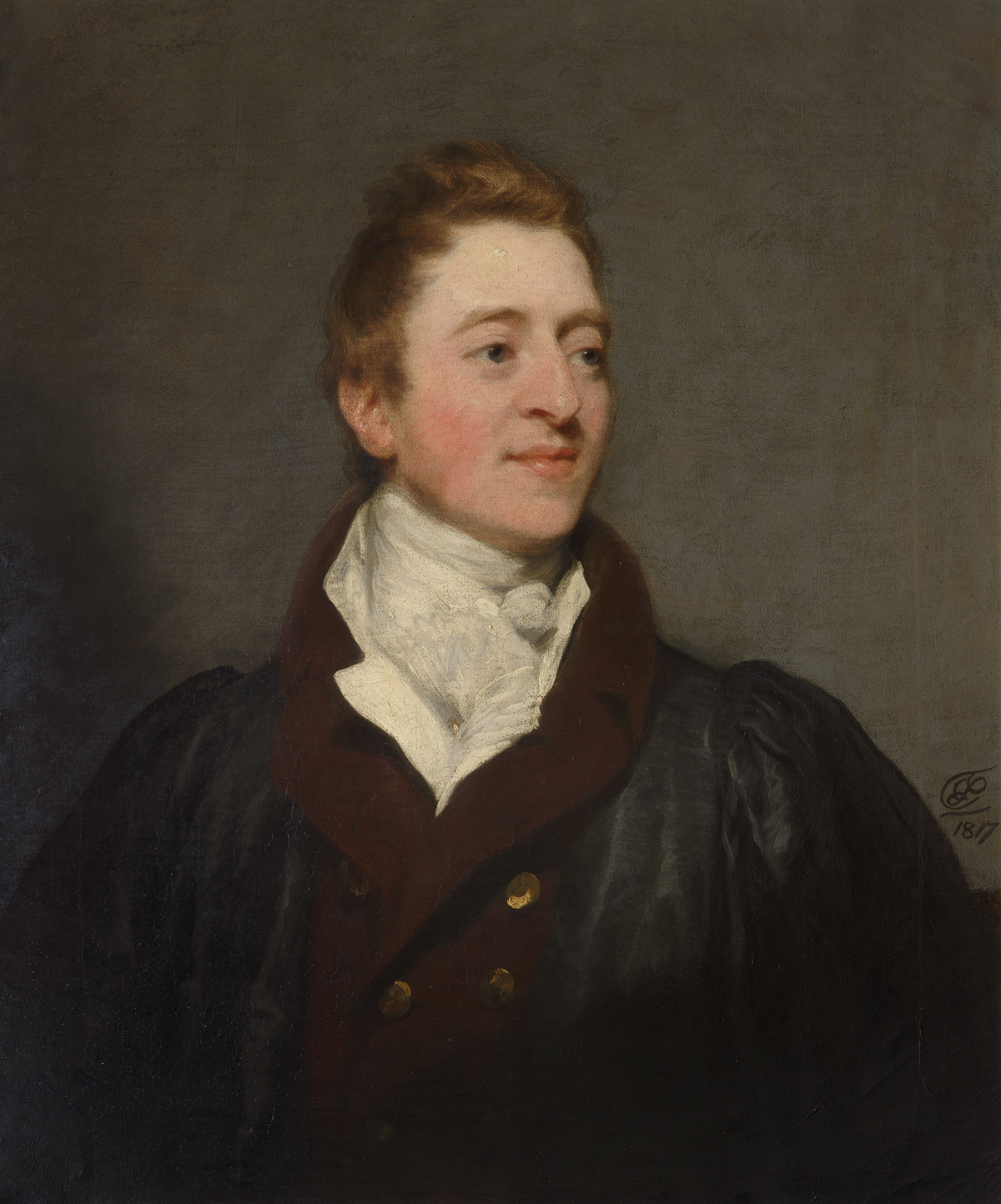
- Portrait by Thomas Phillips, c. 1817

Lord Lieutenant of Ireland
- In office 22 January 1829 – 4 December 1830
- Monarchs: George IV; William IV
- Prime Minister: The Duke of Wellington
- Preceded by: The Marquess of Anglesey
- Succeeded by: The Marquess of Anglesey

Personal details
- Born: 20 April 1785
- Died: 11 February 1847 (aged 61) Alnwick, Northumberland, England
- Party: Tory
- Spouse: Lady Charlotte Clive (m. 1817)
- Parent(s): Hugh Percy, 2nd Duke of Northumberland; Frances Julia Burrell
- Education: Eton; St John's College, Cambridge

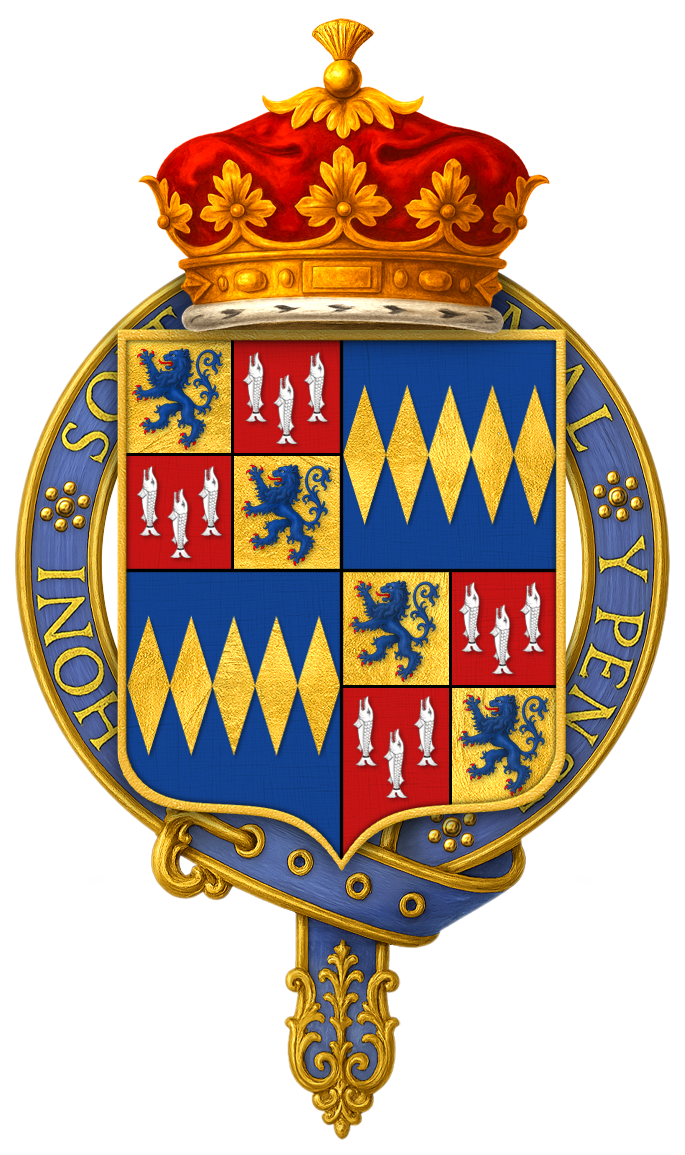
Quartered arms of Hugh Percy, 3rd Duke of Northumberland, KG, PC

Hugh Percy, 3rd Duke of Northumberland KG, PC (20 April 1785 – 11 February 1847), styled Earl Percy until 1817, was a British aristocrat and Tory politician who served as Lord Lieutenant of Ireland under the Duke of Wellington from 1829 to 1830.

== Background and education ==
Northumberland was the son of Hugh Percy, 2nd Duke of Northumberland, and Frances Julia, daughter of Peter Burrell. He was educated at Eton and the University of Cambridge (St John's College).

== Political career ==
Northumberland entered parliament as the member for Buckingham in July 1806. In September of that year he was elected member for the City of Westminster, on the death of Charles James Fox. He declined to fight the seat at the general election two months later, instead being returned for Launceston. In 1807, he offered himself as a candidate for the county of Northumberland in opposition to Charles, Lord Howick (afterwards the 2nd Earl Grey), who declined to contest the seat. Percy was returned unopposed, and continued to sit until 1812, when he was called to the House of Lords through a writ of acceleration by the title Baron Percy.

In 1817, he succeeded his father as Duke of Northumberland. He served as Ambassador Extraordinary at the coronation of Charles X of France in 1825, defraying the expenses thereof himself, and he "astonished the continental nobility of the magnitude of his retinue, the gorgeousness of his equippage, and the profuseness of his liberality".

In March 1829, he was appointed Lord-Lieutenant of Ireland, a post he held until the following year. He was thus in office when the Catholic Emancipation Act was passed, and was pronounced by Robert Peel "the best chief governor that ever presided over the affairs of Ireland."

== Other public positions ==
In November 1834, Northumberland was elected high Steward of the university of Cambridge, holding that honour until 1840 when he was made chancellor of the university.

He played a prominent role in the establishment of the Church Building Society responsible for building the so-called "Waterloo churches" during the early 19th century. He proposed the CBS's formation at a meeting in the Freemasons' Hall, London on 6 February 1818, chaired by the Archbishop of Canterbury. The Society lobbied parliament to provide funding for a church building programme, and parliament subsequently passed the Church Building Act, voting £l,000,000 to the cause.

He also played a part in the development of football in a time when it was a controversial game by providing a field for the annual Alnwick Shrove Tuesday game and presenting the ball before the match—a ritual that continues to this day. Between 1817 and 1847 he held the honorary post of Lord Lieutenant of Northumberland.

== Family ==
Northumberland married Lady Charlotte Clive, daughter of Edward Clive, 1st Earl of Powis, and the mineral collector Henrietta Clive, Countess of Powis on 29 April 1817 at Northumberland House. They had no children.

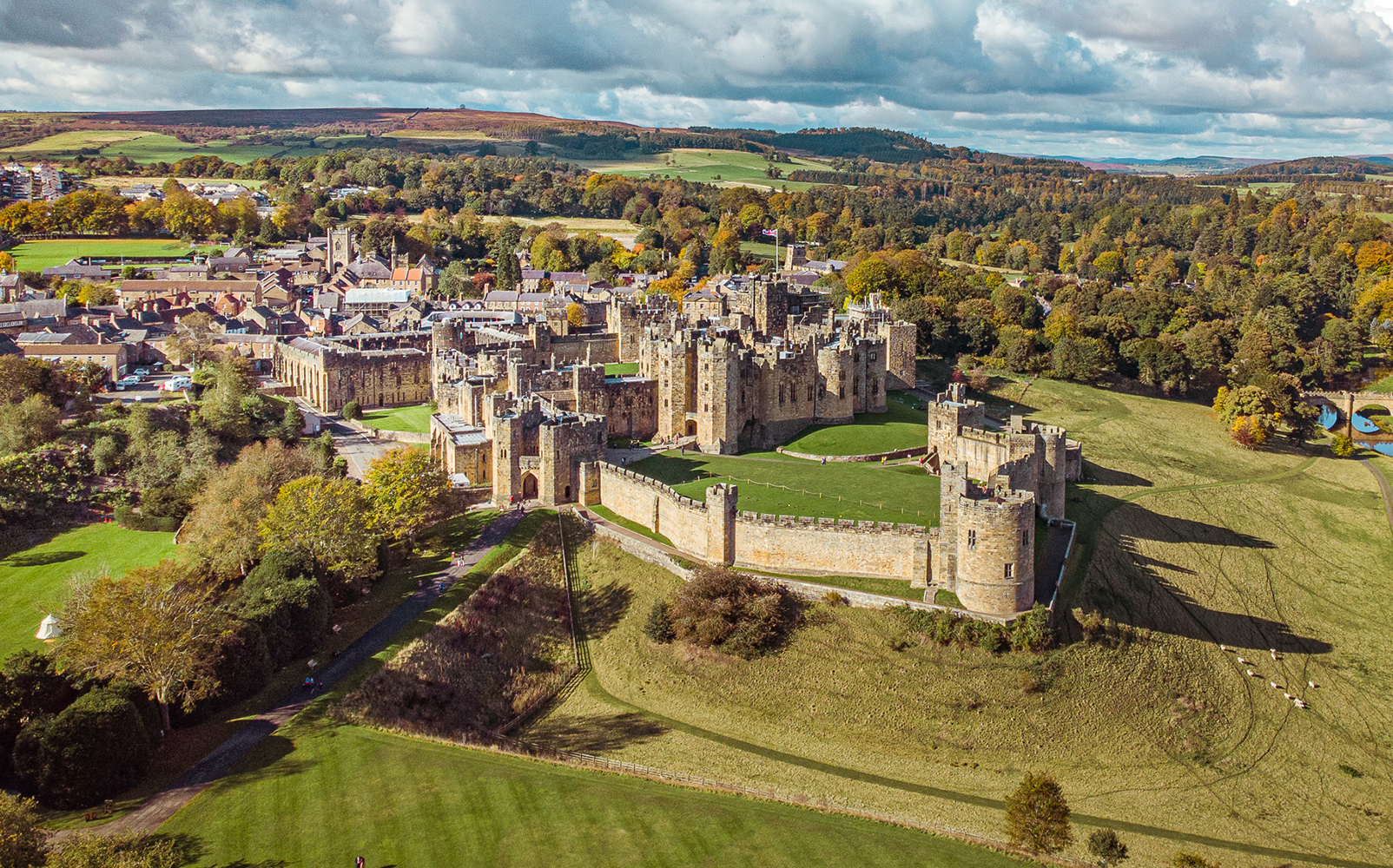
Alnwick Castle

Northumberland died at Alnwick in February 1847, aged 61. His remains were interred in the Northumberland Vault within Westminster Abbey on 23 February.

He was succeeded by his younger brother, Lord Prudhoe. In August 1851, an altar monument to the Duke was placed in St Paul's Church, Alnwick.

== See also ==
- Syon House

Parliament of the United Kingdom
Preceded by Thomas Grenville; Lord John Proby	Member of Parliament for Buckingham; 1806; With: Thomas Grenville	Succeeded by Thomas Grenville; Sir William Young, 2nd Bt
Preceded by James Brogden; Richard Bennet	Member of Parliament for Launceston; 1806–1807; With: James Brogden	Succeeded by James Brogden; Richard Bennet
Preceded by Charles Grey; Thomas Beaumont	Member of Parliament for Northumberland; 1807–1812; With: Thomas Beaumont	Succeeded by Thomas Beaumont; Sir Charles Monck, Bt
Political offices
Preceded by The Marquess of Anglesey	Lord Lieutenant of Ireland; 1829–1830	Succeeded by The Marquess of Anglesey
Academic offices
Preceded by The Marquess Camden	Chancellor of the University of Cambridge; 1840–1847	Succeeded by The Prince Consort
Honorary titles
Preceded by The Duke of Northumberland	Lord Lieutenant of Northumberland; 1817–1847	Succeeded by The Earl Grey
Vacant Title last held by The Duke of Northumberland	Vice-Admiral of Northumberland; 1822–1847	Vacant
Peerage of Great Britain
Preceded by Hugh Percy	Duke of Northumberland; 1817–1847	Succeeded by Algernon Percy
Preceded by Hugh Percy	Baron Percy (writ in acceleration); 1812–1847	Succeeded by Algernon Percy
