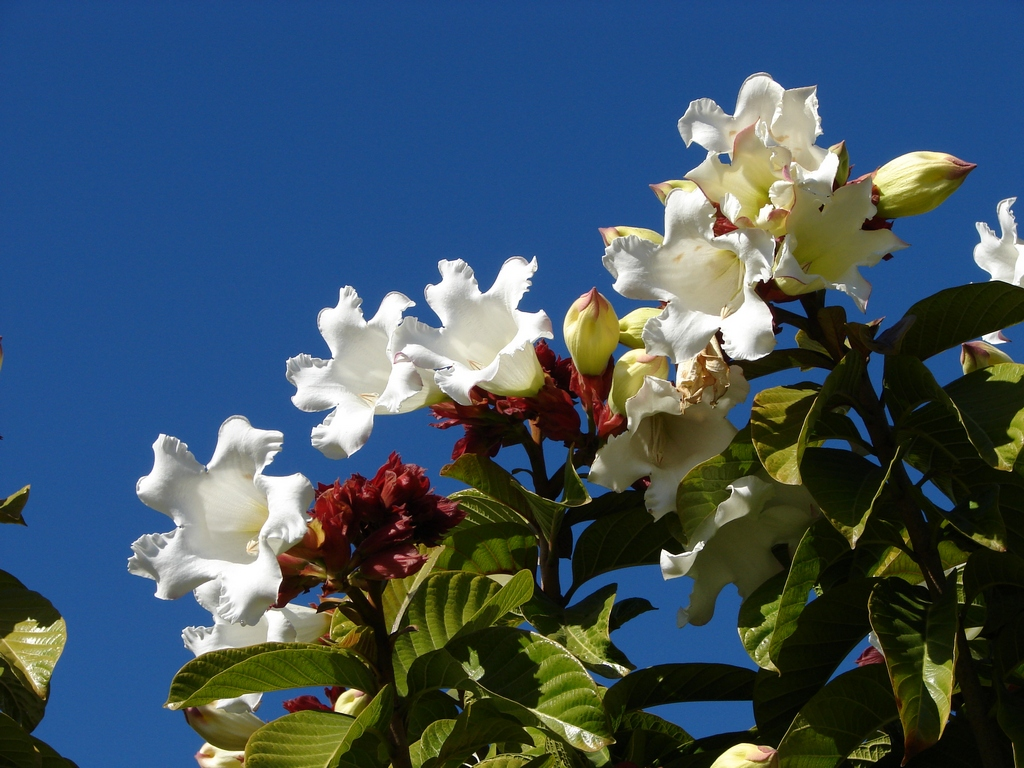
- Beaumontia grandiflora

Scientific classification
- Kingdom: Plantae
- Clade: Tracheophytes
- Clade: Angiosperms
- Clade: Eudicots
- Clade: Asterids
- Order: Gentianales
- Family: Apocynaceae
- Subfamily: Apocynoideae
- Tribe: Apocyneae
- Genus: Beaumontia; Wall.

Synonyms
- Muantum Pichon

= Beaumontia =

Genus of vines

Beaumontia is a small genus of evergreen woody vines in the milkweed family. It is native to China, the Indian subcontinent, and Southeast Asia.

== Description ==
Beaumontia plants are often rampant climbers and vines. They are mostly evergreen, though in subtropical gardens Beaumontia grandiflora loses many leaves in winter. Leaves are large, smooth and opposite with sticky white sap from petiolar glands.

The large white fragrant flowers are borne in corymbs terminal and in the leaf axils. The calyx is 5-lobed and the corolla is dark funnel-or bell-shaped with 5 lobes. Stamens are attached near the base of the corolla tube and have slender filaments with arrow-shaped anthers. They are very showy when in full bloom and are regarded as among the most outstanding vines of the world.

The fruits (seed capsules) comprises a pair of thick woody follicles. The seeds are compressed, apex gradually narrows with a silky coma (a tuft of hairs).

== Taxonomy ==
The genus was circumscribed by Nathaniel Wallich in Tent. Fl. Napal. on page 14 in 1824.

The genus name of Beaumontia is in honour of Diana Wentworth Beaumont (1765–1831), who was an English gardener and married to Colonel Thomas Richard Beaumont (1758–1829) of Bretton Hall, Wakefield, Yorkshire. She had an estate with massive dome-shaped glasshouse for exotic plants at Bretton Hall.

== Cultivation ==
The Beaumontia species are cultivated as ornamental plants, with Beaumontia grandiflora widely grown by the nursery trade. They prefer good soil, adequate water and hot moist conditions. They are found planted and trained as vines in subtropical climate gardens, such as in Southern California.

They are propagated from seed or half-hardened cuttings taken with a heel, rooted in sandy soil under mist.

== Species ==
As accepted by Kew;

1. Beaumontia brevituba Oliv. - Guangxi, Hainan
2. Beaumontia grandiflora Wall. - Vietnam, Thailand, Laos, Myanmar, Assam, Bhutan, Bangladesh, Sikkim, Nepal, Guangxi, Yunnan; naturalized in Central America
3. Beaumontia jerdoniana Wight - S India, Andaman Islands, Myanmar
4. Beaumontia khasiana Hook.f - Yunnan, Assam, Myanmar
5. Beaumontia longituba Craib - Nagaland
6. Beaumontia macrantha (Ridl.) Rudjiman - S Myanmar, S Thailand
7. Beaumontia multiflora Teijsm. & Binn. - Java, Bali, W Malaysia, Sumatra; naturalized in Thailand, Hawaii
8. Beaumontia murtonii Craib - Yunnan, Thailand, Vietnam, Laos, Cambodia, W Malaysia
9. Beaumontia pitardii Tsiang - N Vietnam, Guangxi, Yunnan

=== formerly included ===
- Beaumontia indecora Baill = Vallaris indecora (Baill.) Tsiang & P.T.Li
- Beaumontia wallichii (A.DC.) Walp. = Wrightia arborea (Dennst.) Mabb.

== Beaumontia grandiflora gallery ==
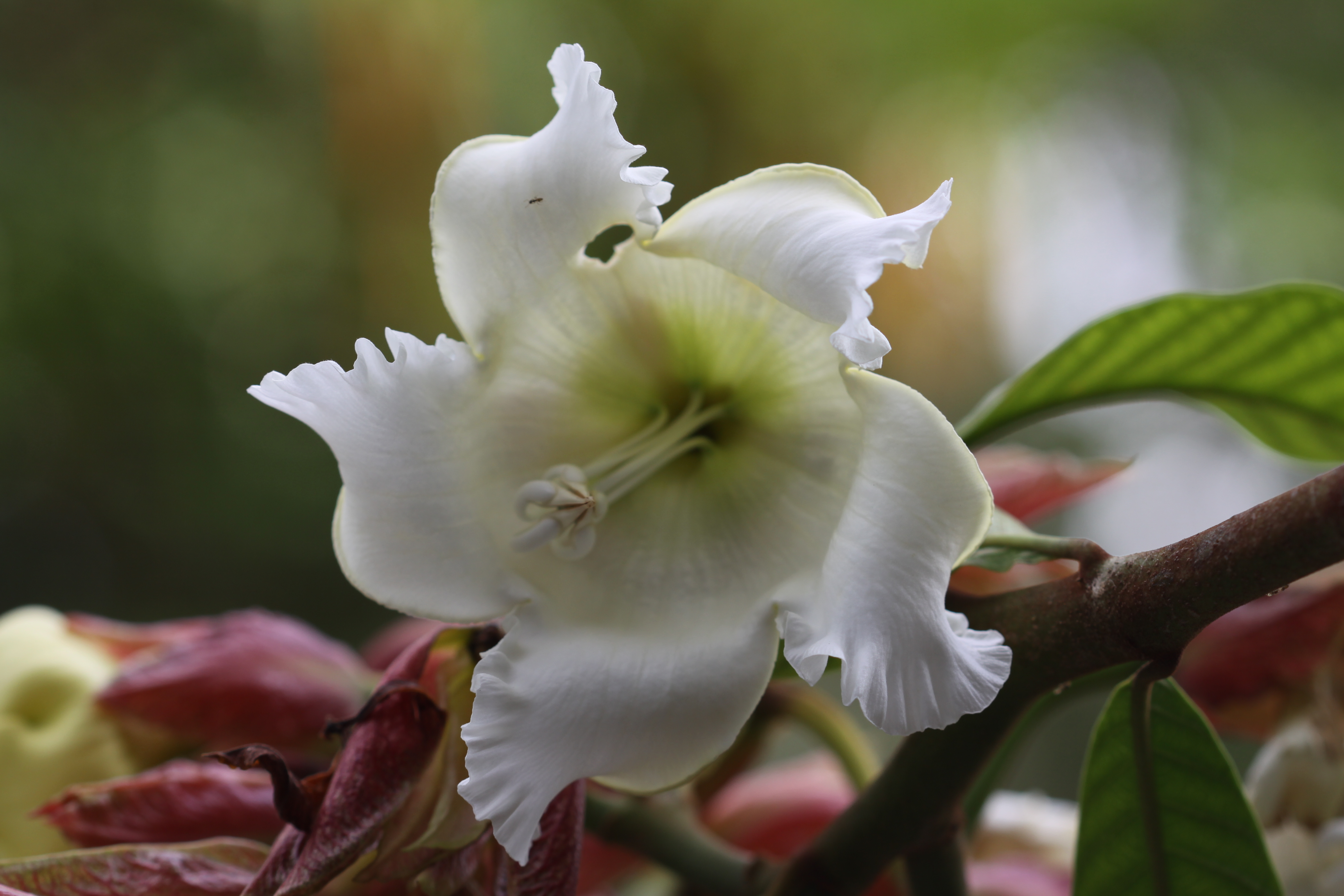
Beaumontia grandiflora

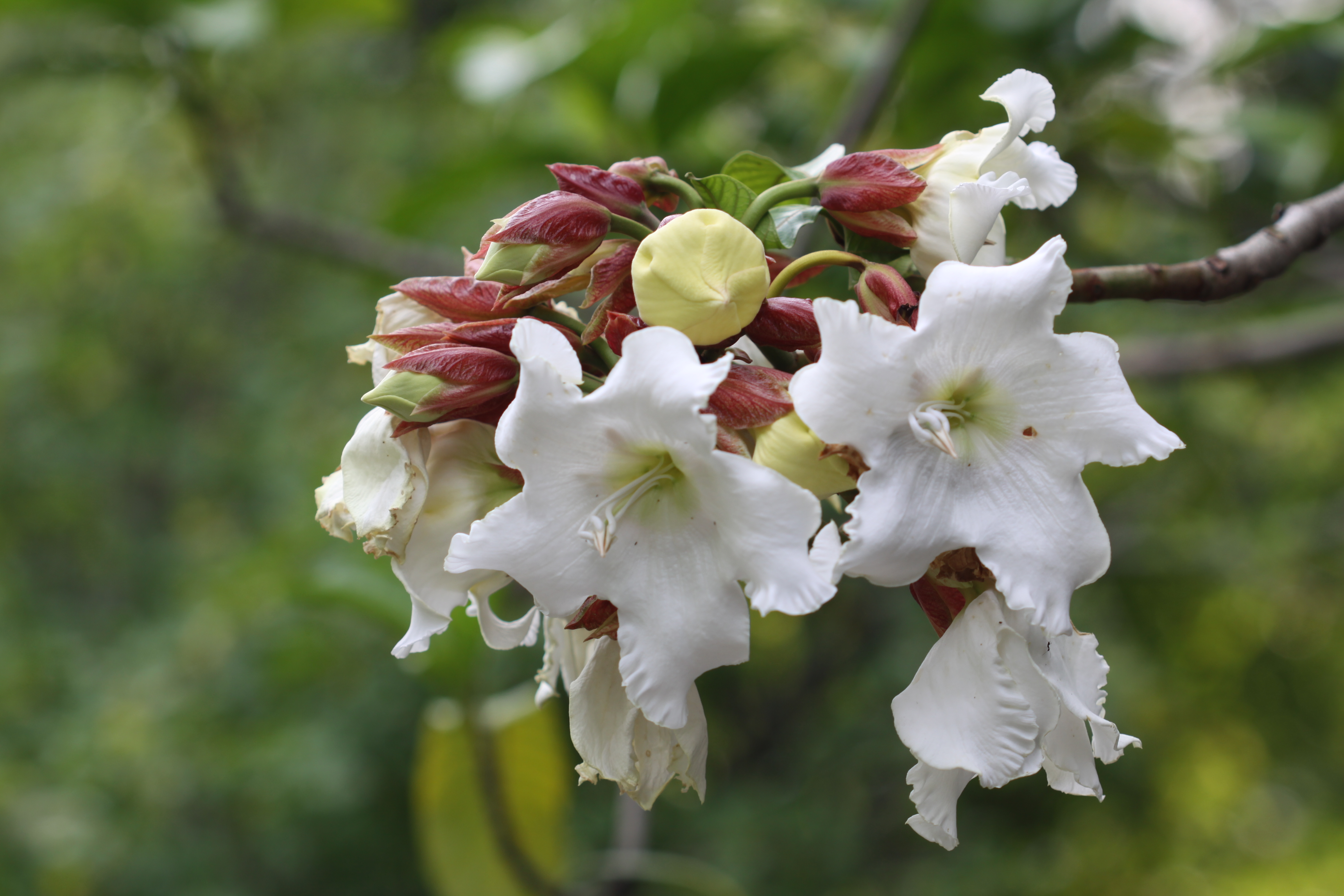
Beaumontia grandiflora

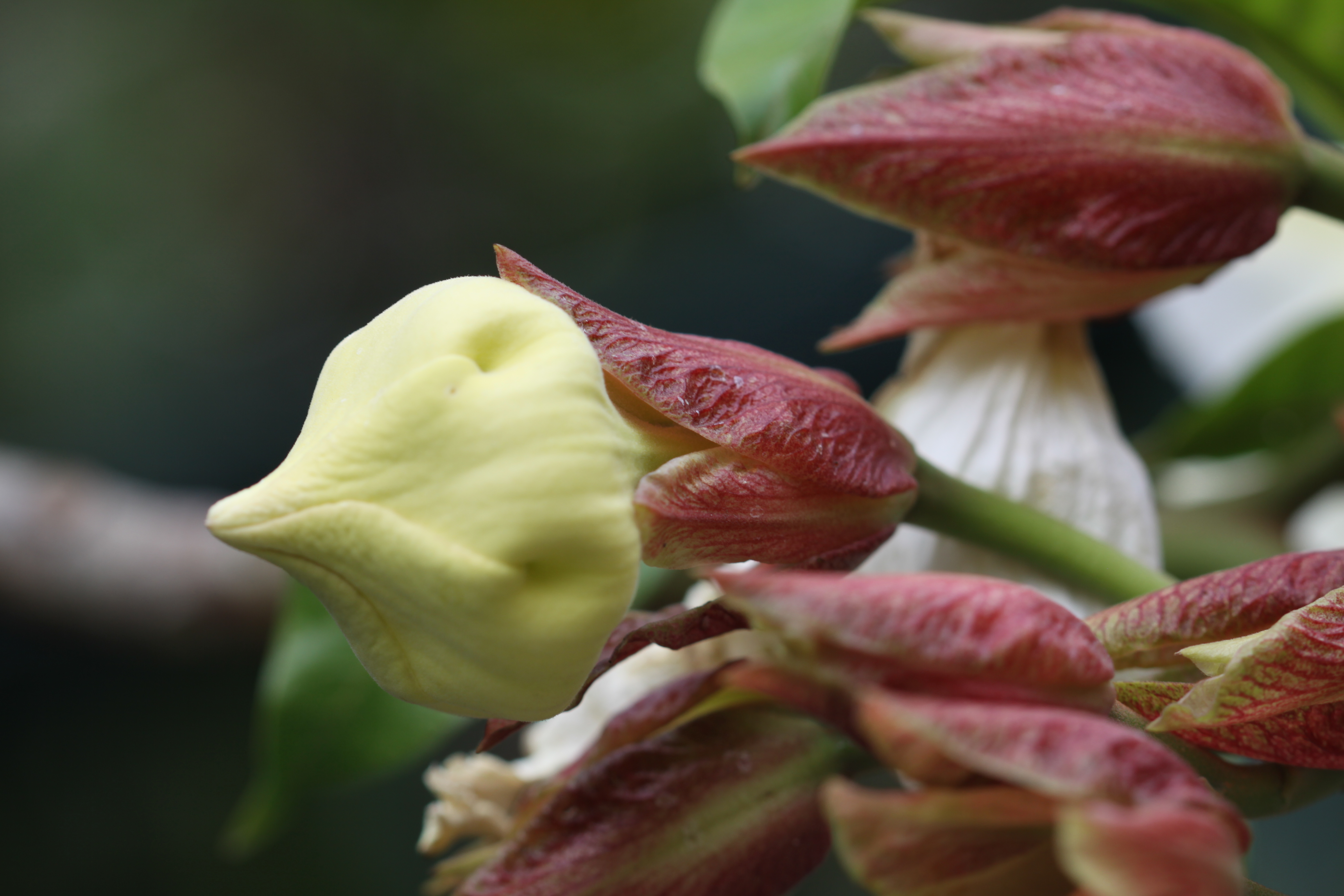
Beaumontia grandiflora

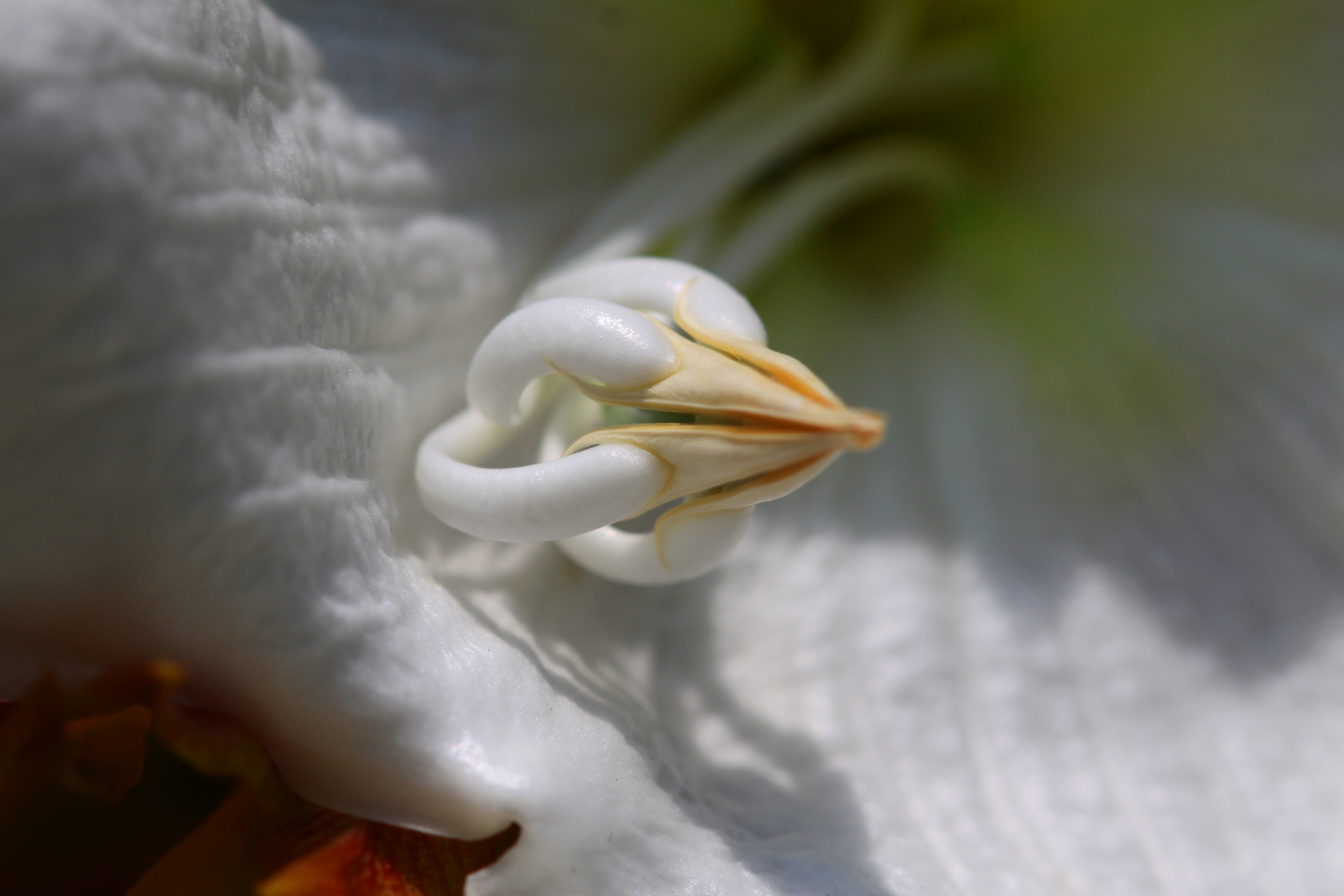
Beaumontia grandiflora
