= Black Heddon =

Village in Northumberland, England

Coordinates: 55.083°N 1.884°W

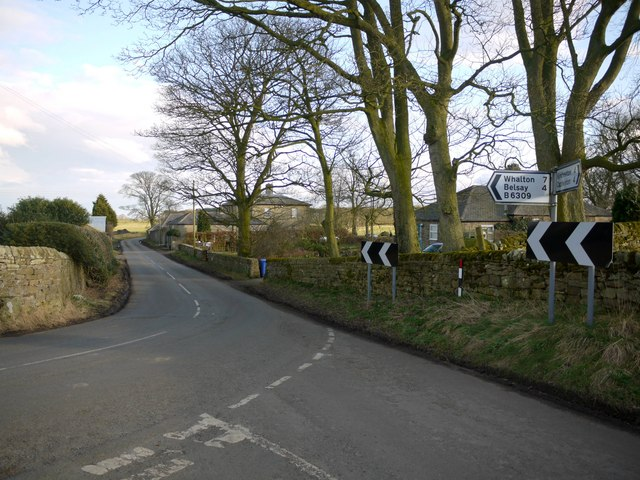

- Location within Northumberland
- OS grid reference: NZ075765
- Civil parish: Belsay
- Unitary authority: Northumberland
- Ceremonial county: Northumberland
- Region: North East
- Country: England
- Sovereign state: United Kingdom
- Post town: NEWCASTLE UPON TYNE
- Postcode district: NE20
- Dialling code: 01661
- Police: Northumbria
- Fire: Northumberland
- Ambulance: North East
- UK Parliament: Berwick-upon-Tweed

Black Heddon is a village and former civil parish, now in the parish of Belsay, in the county of Northumberland, England. It is situated to the north-west of Newcastle upon Tyne, between Stamfordham and Belsay. In 1951 the parish had a population of 45.

According to local legend, the village was once haunted by a ghost named Silky, who used to jump onto travellers' horses. In nearby Belsay is a tree overlooking a waterfall which is known as Silky's Chair.

== Governance ==
Black Heddon is in the parliamentary constituency of Berwick-upon-Tweed. Black Heddon was formerly a township in Stamfordham parish, from 1866 Black Heddon was a civil parish in its own right until it was abolished on 1 April 1955 and merged with Belsey.
