= James Brogden (MP) =

British Member of Parliament (c.1765–1842)

Member of Parliament for Launceston
- In office 1796–1832

James Brogden (c. 1765–1842) was a British merchant, company director, speculator, and politician.

== Life ==
Brogden was brought into parliament by Earl Percy and was a Member of Parliament for Launceston from 1796 to 1832. He lost his political reputation after a share fraud was uncovered in a company mining coal at Arigna, Ireland.
