= Thomas Richard Beaumont =

British politician

- Arms of Beaumont, of Bretton Hall, Yorkshire: Gules, a lion rampant or armed and langued azure an orle of eight crescents of the second
- Born: 29 April 1758; Darton, South Yorkshire
- Died: 31 July 1829 (aged 71); Bretton Hall, West Yorkshire
- Occupations: Colonel, politician
- Spouse: Diana Wentworth
- Children: Thomas Wentworth Beaumont
- Parents: Thomas Beaumont (father); Anne Ayscough (mother)
- Relatives: Sir Thomas Wentworth, 5th Baronet (father-in-law); Baron Allendale (descendant); Viscount Allendale (descendant)

Colonel Thomas Richard Beaumont (29 April 1758 – 31 July 1829) of Bretton Hall, Wakefield, Yorkshire, was a British Tory politician and soldier.

== Origins ==
He was the son of Thomas Beaumont of The Oaks in Darton, Yorkshire, by his wife Anne Ayscough, daughter of Edward Ayscough.

== Career ==
In 1794 Beaumont raised the 21st Light Dragoons and served as the regiment's colonel until 1802. He entered the British House of Commons in 1795 and sat for Northumberland first in the Parliament of Great Britain, then in Parliament of the United Kingdom until 1818.

== Marriage and children ==
Beaumont married Diana Wentworth (1765–1831), daughter of Sir Thomas Wentworth, 5th Baronet, by whom he had three daughters and five sons, including Thomas Wentworth Beaumont, eldest son, also MP for Northumberland, and the ancestor of Baron Allendale and Viscount Allendale.

The genus of plant in the Apocynaceae family was named Beaumontia in Diana Wentworth Beaumont's honour as she was a botanical patron.

== Death and burial ==
Beaumont died at his seat Bretton Hall in Yorkshire.

Military offices
New regiment	Colonel of the 21st Light Dragoons; 1794–1802	Succeeded by Banastre Tarleton
Parliament of Great Britain
Preceded by Hon. Charles Grey; Sir William Middleton	Member of Parliament for Northumberland; 1795–1801; With: Hon. Charles Grey	Succeeded by Parliament of the United Kingdom
Parliament of the United Kingdom
Preceded by Parliament of Great Britain	Member of Parliament for Northumberland; 1801–1818; With: Hon. Charles Grey 1801–1807; Earl Percy 1807–1812; Sir Charles Monck 1812–1818	Succeeded by Charles John Brandling; Thomas Wentworth Beaumont
