= Middleton baronets of Belsay Castle (1662) =

Middleton baronets, of Belsay Castle, Northumberland

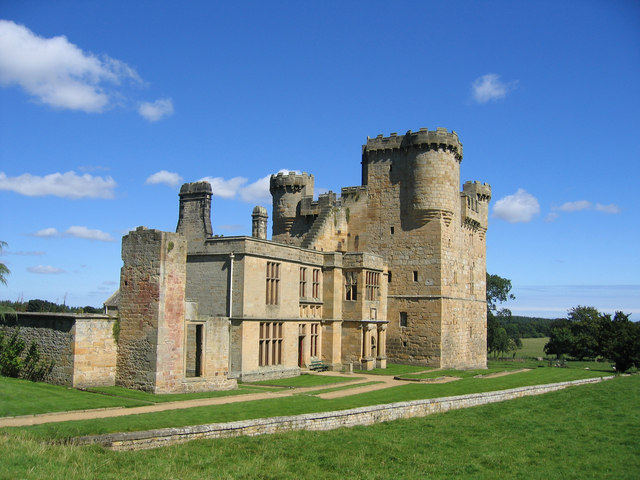
Belsay Castle in Northumberland, the former seat of the Middleton baronets of Belsay Castle

The Middleton Baronetcy, of Belsay Castle in the County of Northumberland, was created in the Baronetage of England on 24 October 1662 for William Middleton, of Belsay Castle, Belsay, Northumberland. The Middletons were descended from Richard Middleton who was Lord Chancellor to Henry III. His grandson Sir Gilbert Middleton took part in a rebellion against Edward II. He was captured and executed. The Middleton estates including Belsay were forfeited to the Crown but were restored to the family by marriage in the reign of Edward III. Sir John Middleton was a fervent Yorkist in the 15th century and fought at the Battles of St Albans in 1455 and Bosworth in 1485. The third, fifth and sixth Baronets all sat as Member of Parliament for Northumberland. The sixth Baronet assumed in 1799 by Royal sign-manual the surname of Monck in lieu of his patronymic, according to the will of his maternal grandfather Lawrence Monck. The seventh Baronet, who represented Durham in Parliament, resumed the use of the surname of Middleton.

The title became extinct on the death of the tenth Baronet in 1999. The Middleton family and estate records are held in the archives of the Northumberland Record Office.

== Middleton baronets, of Belsay Castle, Northumberland (1662) ==
- Sir William Middleton, 1st Baronet (c. 1625–1690)
- Sir John Middleton, 2nd Baronet (1678–1717)
- Sir William Middleton, 3rd Baronet (c. 1700–1757), MP for Northumberland 1722–1757
- Sir John Lambert Middleton, 4th Baronet (1705–1768)
- Sir William Middleton, 5th Baronet (1738–1795), MP for Northumberland 1774–1795
- Sir Charles Miles Lambert Middleton, 6th Baronet (Monck from 11 February 1799) (1779–1867), MP for Northumberland 1812–20
- Sir Arthur Edward Monck, 7th Baronet (Middleton from 12 February 1876) (1838–1933), MP for Durham 1874–80
- Sir Charles Arthur Middleton, 8th Baronet (1873–1942)
- Sir Stephen Hugh Middleton, 9th Baronet (1909–1993)
- Sir Lawrence Monck Middleton, 10th Baronet (1912–1999), title extinct on his death.
