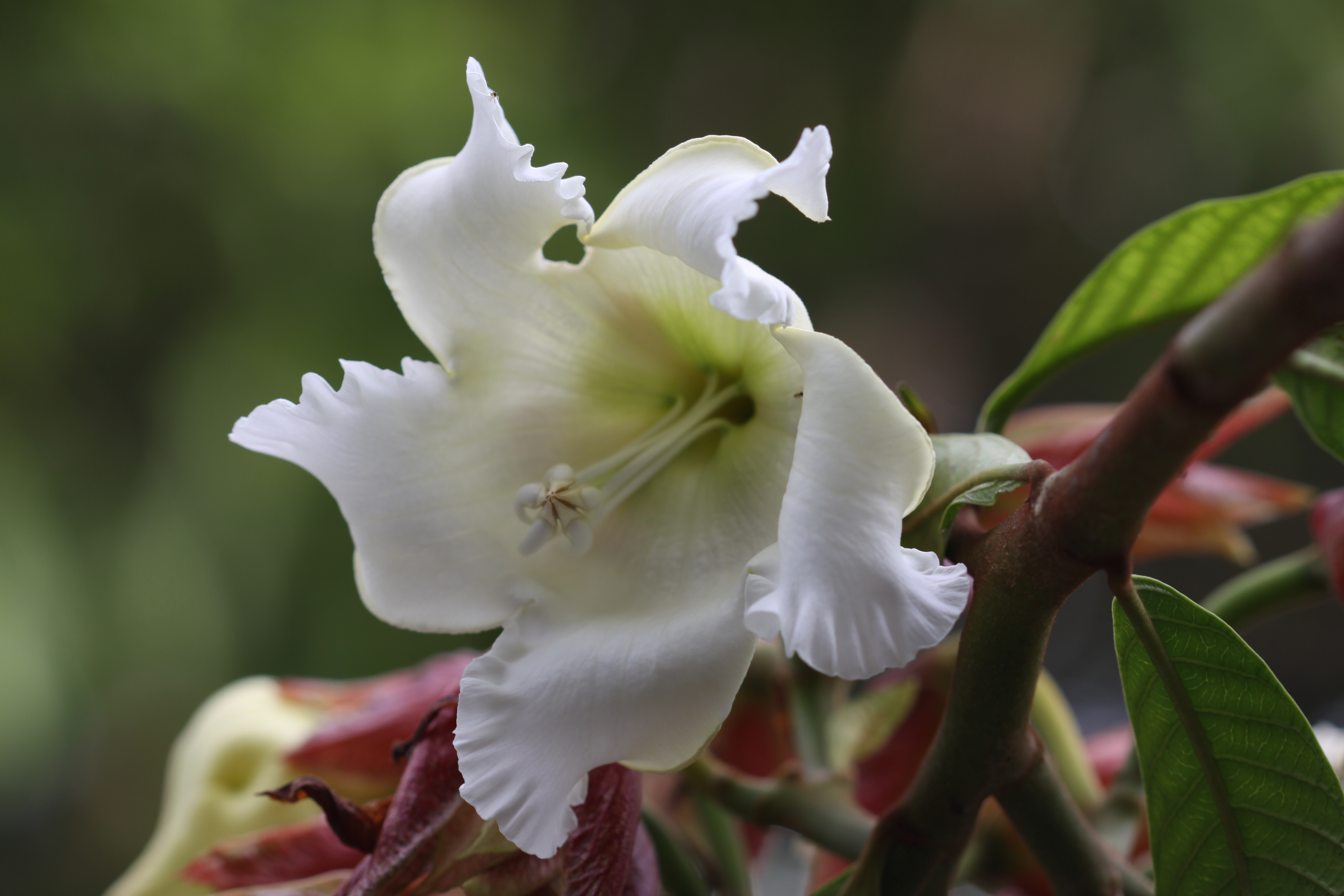
- Close-up of flower
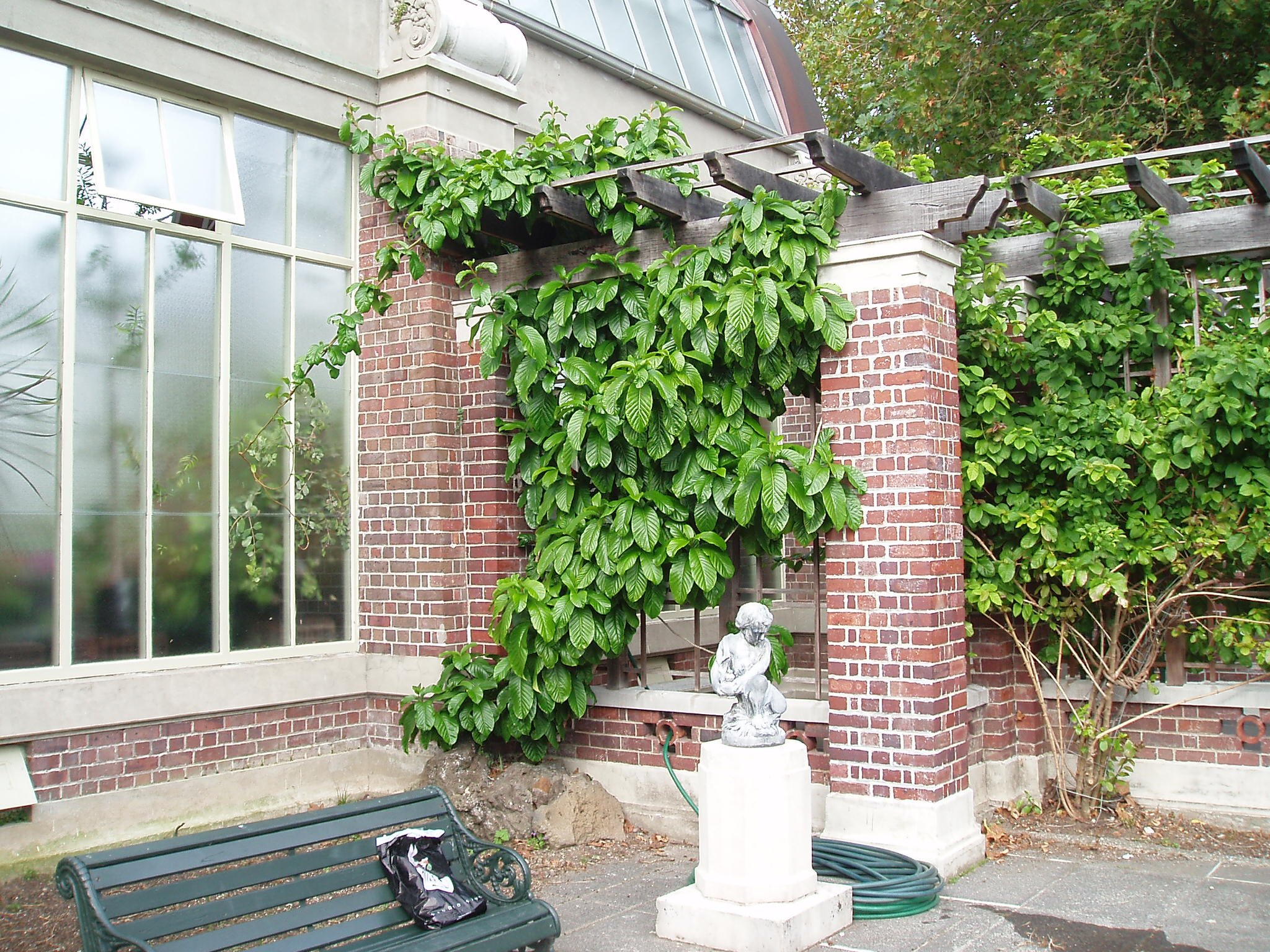
- In a garden setting

Scientific classification
- Kingdom: Plantae
- Clade: Tracheophytes
- Clade: Angiosperms
- Clade: Eudicots
- Clade: Asterids
- Order: Gentianales
- Family: Apocynaceae
- Genus: Beaumontia
- Species: B. grandiflora

Binomial name
- Beaumontia grandiflora Wall.

Synonyms
- Beaumontia longiflora Hook.f.; Beaumontia longifolia Lodd. ex G.Don; Echites grandiflorus Roxb.

= Beaumontia grandiflora =

Species of plant in the dogbane family

Beaumontia grandiflora, the Easter lily vine, herald's trumpet, or Nepal trumpet flower, is a species of flowering plant in the family Apocynaceae. It is native to the eastern Indian Subcontinent, southern China, and mainland Southeast Asia, and has been introduced to a number of locales in Central America. With its vining habit and trumpet-shaped flowers it is widely cultivated as an ornamental.

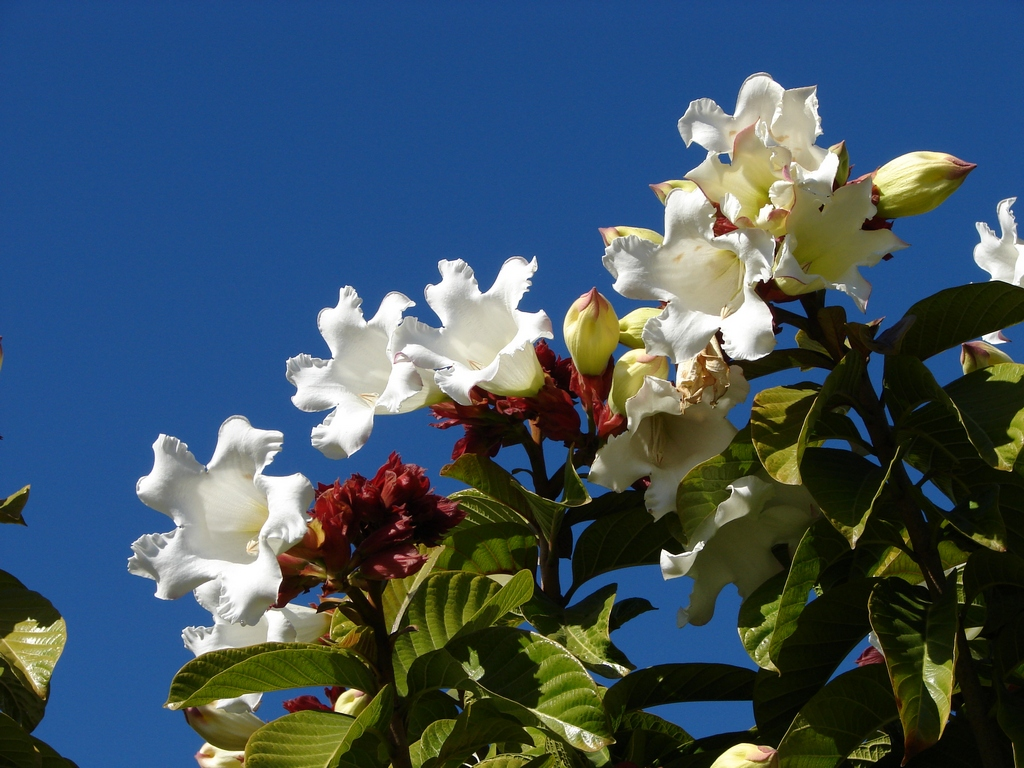
In bloom in Australia

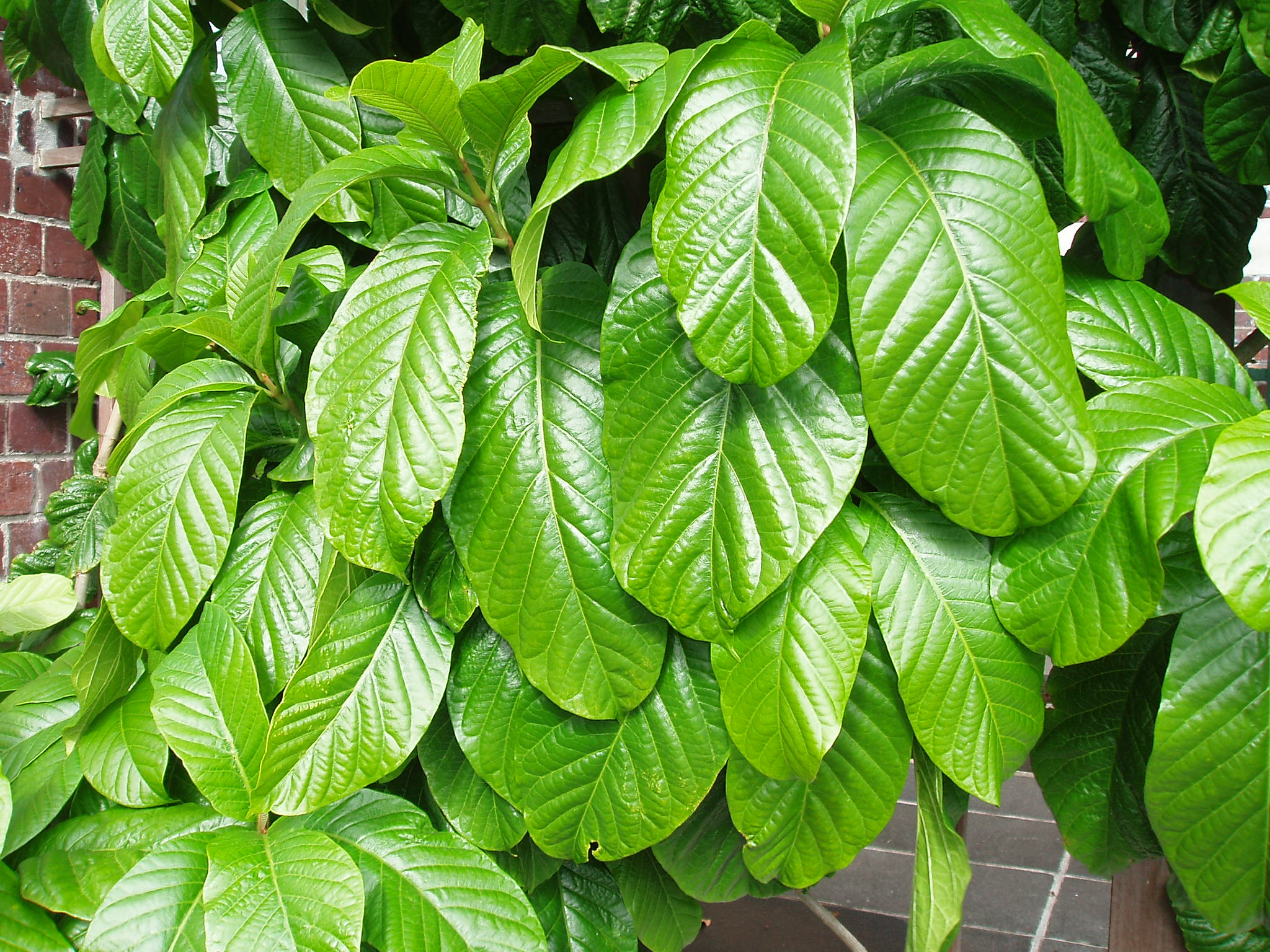
Leaves

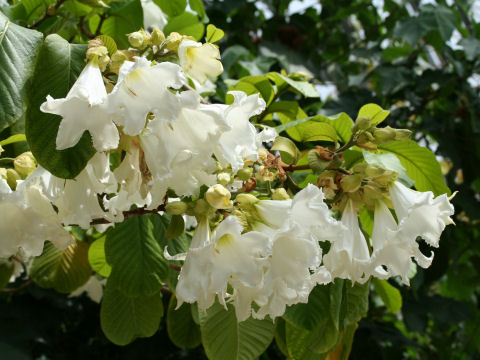
Flowers are usually pendant.

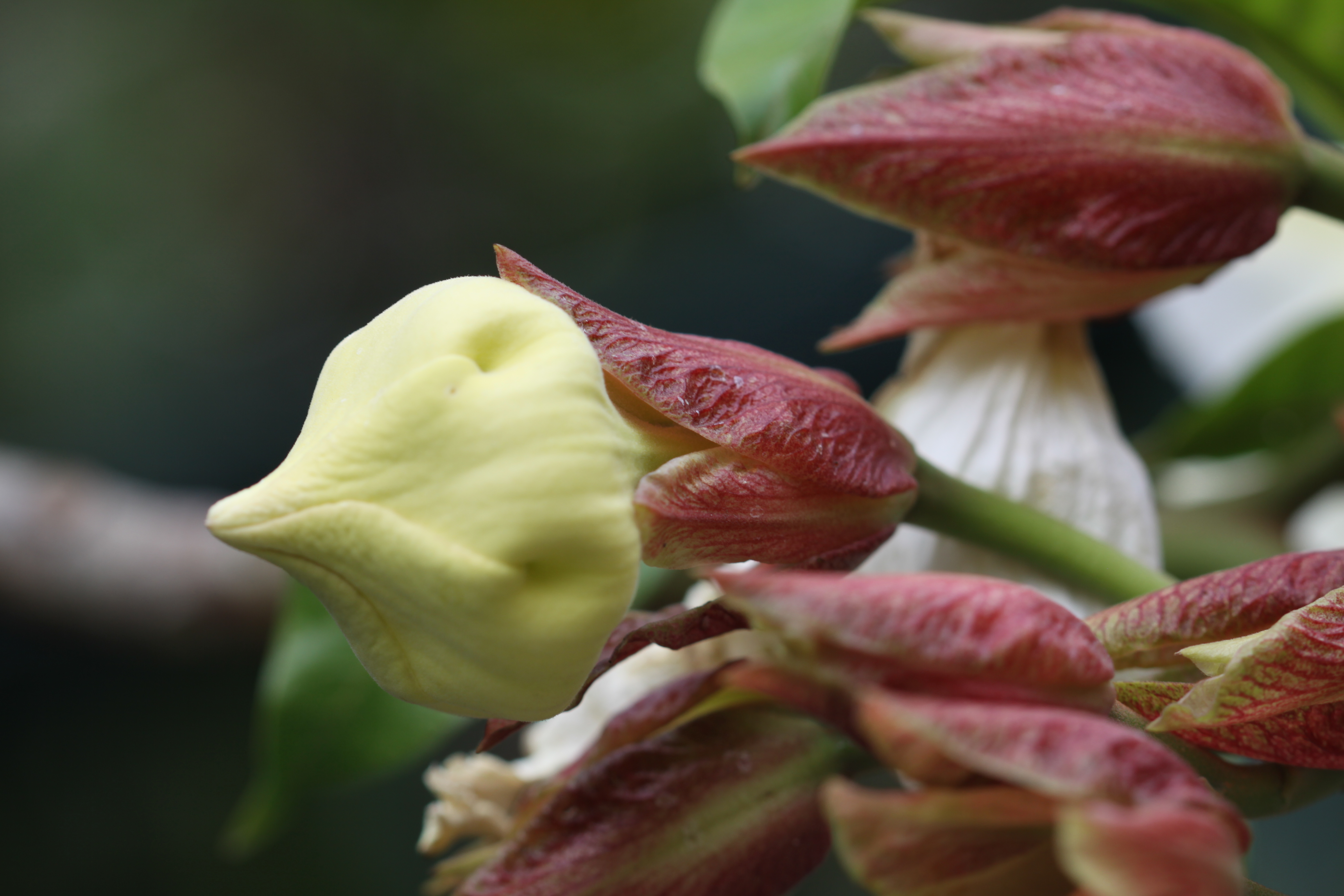
Flower buds
