= 21st Regiment of (Light) Dragoons =

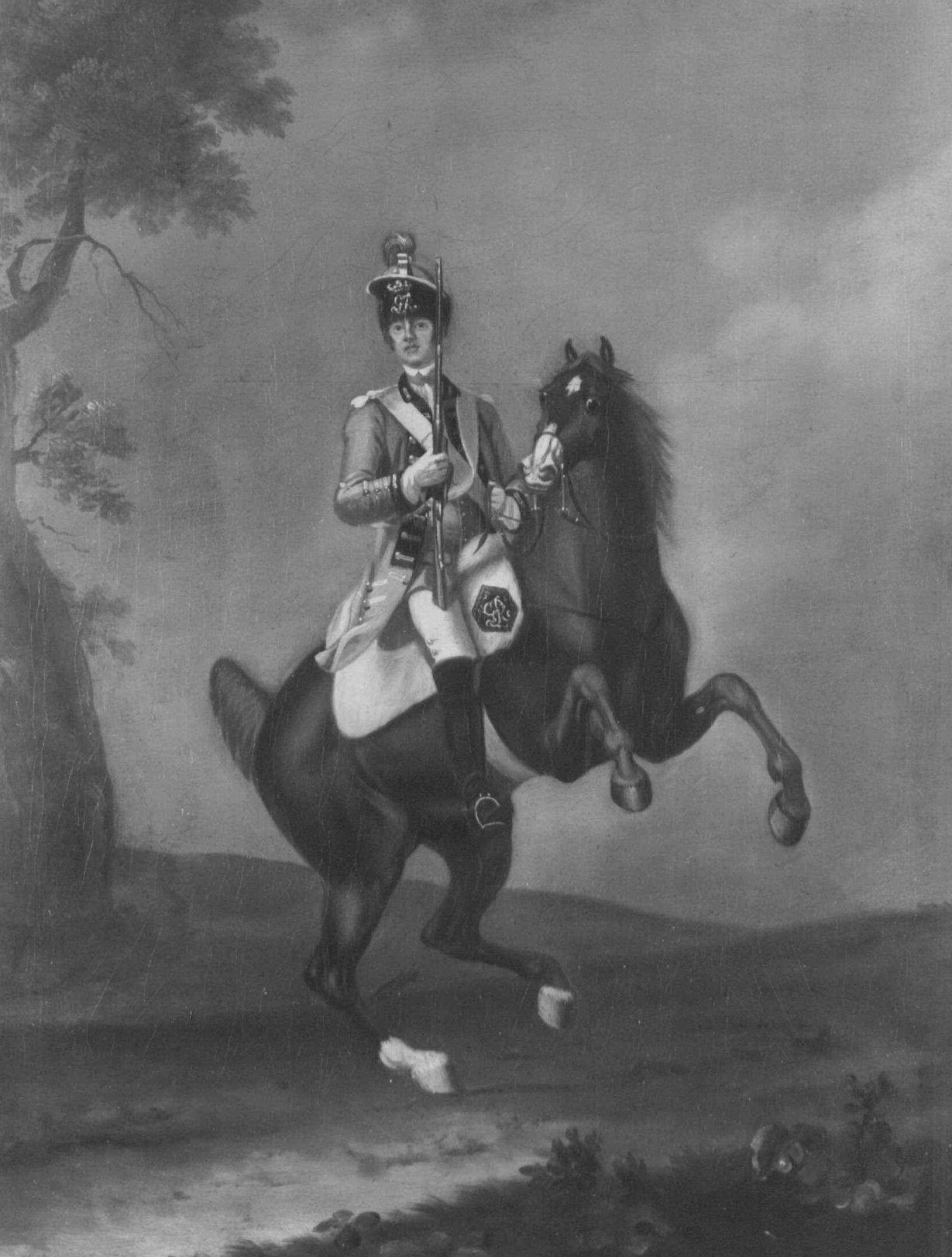
1760–1763 painting of a private of the 21st Light Dragoons (Royal Foresters)

The 21st Light Dragoons was a cavalry regiment of the British Army. It was raised on 5 April 1760, as the 21st Light Dragoons (Royal Foresters) by John Manners, Marquess of Granby, and Lord Robert Manners-Sutton. This first regiment was however disbanded at Nottingham on 3 March 1763. It was raised again in 1779 by Major-General John Douglas and disbanded in Canterbury in 1783.

The regiment was raised a third time in 1794 in the north of England when it was also known as the Yorkshire Light Dragoons, served in Ireland during the Napoleonic Wars and was disbanded in Chatham in 1819. Regimental colonels were Colonel Thomas Richard Beaumont (1794–1802) and General Sir Banastre Tarleton, Bt., (1802–?1818)

Between 1806 and 1816 it was stationed in Cape Colony. While stationed here it sent men to the 1807 Battle of Montevideo in South America, as well as sending men to Barbados between 1808 and 1809. In 1816 it sent men to the Capture of Tristan de Cunha, and to the Third Anglo-Maratha War. However, its presence, and the presence of the other regiments deployed there at the same time, has received little scholarly attention.

In 1857, the East India Company raised the 3rd Bengal European Light Cavalry which, after the passage of the Government of India Act 1858 and the liquidation of the East India Company, briefly became the 21st Regiment of (Light) Dragoons; it was renamed the 21st Hussars in 1863. It became a lancer regiment in 1897, as the 21st Lancers, and in 1899 became the 21st (Empress of India's) Lancers, which adjusted to the 21st Lancers (Empress of India's) in 1921.
