= Middleton baronets =

Set index for Middleton baronets

There have been six baronetcies created for persons with the surname Middleton, four in the Baronetage of England, one in the Baronetage of Great Britain and one in the Baronetage of the United Kingdom. One creation is extant as of 2023.

- Middleton baronets of Ruthin (1622)
- Middleton baronets of Leighton Hall (1642)
- Middleton baronets of Belsay Castle (1662)
- Middleton baronets of Hackney (1681)
- Middleton, later Noel baronets, of the Navy (1781): see Earl of Gainsborough
- Middleton baronets of Crowfield (1804)

== See also ==
- Myddelton baronets of Chirke, Denbighshire
- Myddelton family
