= Belsay Castle =

Medieval castle ruins in Northumberland, England

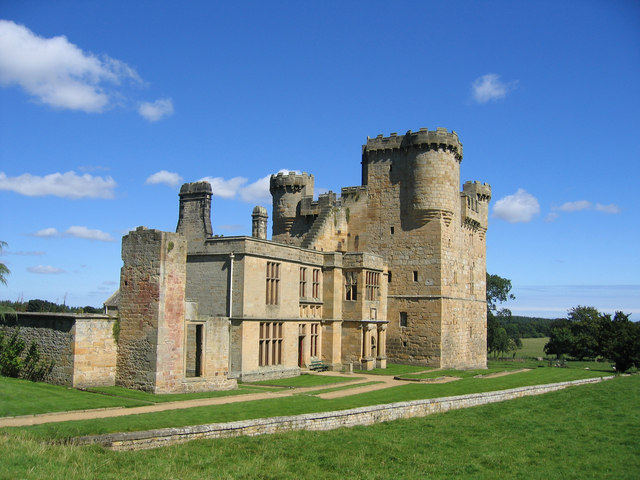

- Location within Northumberland
- 55°06′07″N 1°52′08″W
- Type: Pele tower
- Location: Belsay
- OS grid reference: NZ 08475 78554

History
- Built: c. 1370

Site notes
- Area: Northumberland
- Architectural style: Medieval
- Owner: English Heritage

Scheduled monument
- Official name: Belsay tower house and attached unfortified wing, deserted medieval village, possible moated site, promontory fort and watch post
- Designated: 17 Jan 1935
- Reference no.: 1015517

Listed Building – Grade I
- Official name: Belsay Castle
- Designated: 27 Aug 1952
- Reference no.: 1042837

Belsay Castle is a 14th-century medieval castle situated at Belsay, Northumberland, England. It is a Scheduled Monument and a Grade I listed building.

The main structure, a substantial three-storey rectangular pele tower with rounded turrets and battlements, was constructed about 1370, and was the home of the Middleton family. In 1614 Thomas Middleton built a new manor house attached to the tower. A west wing was added in 1711 but was largely demolished in 1872 by Sir Arthur Middleton when the remainder of the house was considerably altered.

The castle was abandoned as a residence by the family in the early 19th century when Sir Charles Monck built Belsay Hall close by. The interiors were largely removed and it was then used as a ready-made folly, as was fashionable among the aristocracy at the time, serving as the setting for garden parties and other entertainments.

The castle is administered by English Heritage and is open to the public.

== See also ==
- Castles in Great Britain and Ireland
- List of castles in England
