= Middleton baronets of Hackney (1681) =

Escutcheon of the Middleton baronets of Hackney

The Middleton Baronetcy, of Hackney in the County of Middlesex, was created in the Baronetage of England on 6 December 1681 for Hugh Middleton. The title became extinct on his death in 1702.

== Middleton baronets, of Hackney (1681) ==
- Sir Hugh Middleton, 1st Baronet (c. 1658–1702)
