= John W. Derry =

British historian

John Wesley Derry (born 1933) is a British historian and Emeritus Professor of History at Newcastle University.

He was educated at Emmanuel College, Cambridge between 1959 and 1961, and served as assistant lecturer at the London School of Economics from 1961 until 1963 and as a lecturer from 1963 until 1965. From 1965 until 1970 he was Director of Studies in History and a Fellow of Downing College, Cambridge. He was then appointed lecturer at Newcastle University, a post he held from 1970 until 1973. He spent the remainder of his academic career at Newcastle, where he served as senior lecturer during 1973–1977, as reader during 1977–1992, professor from 1992 until 1998, and since 1998 he has been Emeritus professor of Modern British History.

== Works ==
- William Pitt (London: B. T. Batsford, 1962).
- The Regency Crisis and the Whigs 1788–9 (Cambridge: Cambridge University Press, 1963).
- Reaction and Reform, 1793–1868: England in the Early Nineteenth Century (Blandford Press, 1963). Published in the United States as A Short History of Nineteenth-Century England.
- Parliamentary Reform (London: Macmillan, 1966).
- The Radical Tradition: Tom Paine to Lloyd George (London: Macmillan, 1967).
- Political Parties (London: Macmillan, 1968).
- Charles James Fox (London: Batsford, 1972).
- Castlereagh (London: Allen Lane, 1976).
- English Politics and the American Revolution (Dent, 1976).
- Politics in the Age of Fox, Pitt, and Liverpool: Continuity and Transformation (London: Macmillan, 1990).
- Charles, Earl Grey: Aristocratic Reformer (Oxford: Blackwell, 1992).
