= Middleton baronets of Leighton Hall (1642) =

Middleton baronets of Leighton Hall

The Middleton Baronetcy, of Leighton Hall in the County of Lancaster, was created in the Baronetage of England on 24 June 1642 for George Middleton. The title became extinct on his death in 1673.

== Middleton baronets, of Leighton Hall (1642) ==
- Sir George Middleton, 1st Baronet (1600–1673)
