= Sir Charles Monck, 6th Baronet =

British politician (1779-1867)

Sir Charles Monck 6th Baronet
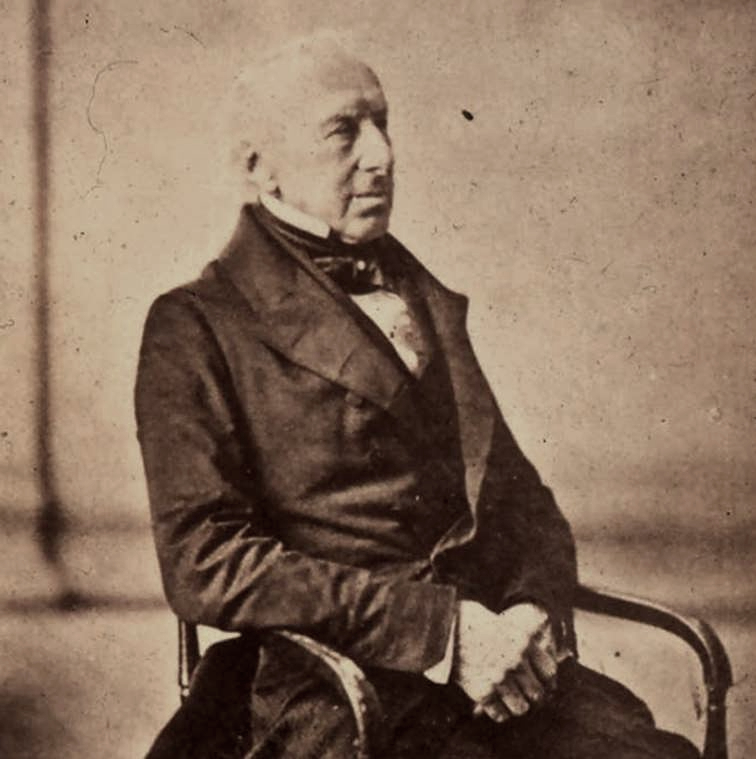
- Sir Charles Monck, 6th Baronet, 1865 photograph

Member of Parliament for Northumberland
- In office 1812–1820 Serving with Thomas Richard Beaumont (1812–1818); Thomas Wentworth Beaumont (1818–1820)
- Preceded by: Thomas Richard Beaumont; Earl Percy
- Succeeded by: Thomas Wentworth Beaumont; Charles John Brandling

Personal details
- Born: 7 April 1779
- Died: 20 July 1867 (aged 88)
- Spouse(s): Louisa Lucia Cook (m. 1804; died 1824) Mary Elizabeth Bennett (m. 1831)
- Children: 6
- Parents: Sir William Middleton, 5th Baronet (father); Jane Monck (mother)
- Relatives: Sir Edward Blackett (son-in-law)
- Education: Rugby School
- Occupation: politician

Sir Charles Miles Lambert Monck, 6th Baronet (7 April 1779 – 20 July 1867) was an English politician. He succeeded to the Baronetcy of Belsay Castle on the death of his father in 1795.

== Life ==
He was born with the surname Middleton, as the third son of Sir William Middleton, 5th Baronet and his wife Jane Monck. He took the surname of his maternal grandfather Laurence Monck of Caenby Hall, Caenby, Lincolnshire who died in 1798, in order to inherit his estate. He was educated at Rugby School and by private tutors at Caenby.

He served as High Sheriff of Northumberland in 1801 and was Member of Parliament for Northumberland 1812–1820, sitting as an independent politician.

Monck was an avid Hellenist and in 1817, with the assistance of architect John Dobson, he completed the building of an impressive new mansion house in Greek Revival style, Belsay Hall, adjacent to Belsay Castle in Northumberland, inspired by his buildings seen in his lengthy honeymoon in Greece. Belsay Castle is a Grade I listed building which has been in the custody of English Heritage since c.1980.

== Family ==
Monck married twice, firstly, in 1804 to Louisa Lucia Cook (died 1824), daughter of Sir George Cooke, 7th Baronet. They had two sons and four daughters.

- Charles Atticus Monck, elder son (1805–1856), was born in Athens. He married in 1835 Laura Ridley, second daughter of Sir Matthew White Ridley, 3rd Baronet. Their son Arthur succeeded as 7th Baronet.
- William Monck, younger son.
- Julia, married as his first wife Sir Edward Blackett, 6th Baronet.
- Louisa Maria, died 1821.

He married secondly, in 1831, Mary Elizabeth Bennett.

Parliament of the United Kingdom
Preceded by Thomas Richard Beaumont; Earl Percy	Member of Parliament for Northumberland; 1812–1820; With: Thomas Richard Beaumont 1812–1818; Thomas Wentworth Beaumont 1818–1820	Succeeded by Thomas Wentworth Beaumont; Charles John Brandling
Baronetage of England
Preceded by William Middleton	Baronet (of Belsay Castle); 1795–1867	Succeeded by Arthur Middleton
