= Middlewich (disambiguation) =

Middlewich is a market town and civil parish in Cheshire, England.

Middlewich may also refer to:

== Buildings and places in Middlewich ==
- Middlewich Branch, a branch of the Shropshire Union Canal
- Middlewich High School, an academy
- Middlewich Manor, a manor house
- Middlewich railway station, a former railway station
- Middlewich Town Hall, a municipal building
- Roman Middlewich

== Other uses ==
- Battle of Middlewich
  - First Battle of Middlewich, a battle during the First English Civil War in March 1643
  - Second Battle of Middlewich, a battle during the First English Civil War in December 1643
- Middlewich First, a minor political party in the United Kingdom
- Middlewich Folk and Boat Festival, an annual festival in Middlewich
- Middlewich Town F.C., an association football club in Middlewich
- The Middlewich Paddies, an Irish folk band

== See also ==
- Middleditch (disambiguation)
