= Middlewich Folk and Boat Festival =

Middlewich Festival

The Middlewich Folk and Boat Festival takes place in June in Middlewich, Cheshire, England. The festival builds on the town's industrial heritage in which canal boats were used to move coal and other raw materials in the town for the production of salt, and then move the salt out of town, either for use directly, or as a raw material in the manufacture of chemicals such as chlorine and soda ash.

The Middlewich Folk and Boat festival is now firmly established on the folk circuit and it is estimated that 30,000 people visit the town during the festival weekend, along with 400 boats. The festival was originally organised by members of the Middlewich Paddies, and taken over by the local council in 2011 when the original committee were unable to continue with the event. In 2008, the festival was declared among the top three folk festivals in England by Guardian Online.

== History ==
The festival has been held since 1990. It was cancelled in 2001 because of Foot and Mouth disease.

== The festival ==
Since 1990 there has been an annual folk music and (canal) boat festival, which is now highly regarded on the folk circuit with visitors coming into the town from all over the UK. During this festival artists appear at venues throughout the town, whilst Morris Dancing and Craft Stalls also featured. The boating festival centres on the Trent and Mersey Canal. The main venues where people and boats converge are the Big Lock and Kings Lock, public houses next to locks of the same name on the Trent and Mersey canal.

== Artistes ==
2014 Poster showing artistes

=== 2014 (13–15 June) ===
- Ade Edmondson & The Bad Shepherds
- The Men They Couldn't Hang
- Hat Fitz & Cara
- Phillip Henry & Hannah Martin
- The Liverpool Shanty Kings
- The Peace Artistes
- Emma Stevens
- Brian McCombe Band
- Merry Hell
- Moulettes
- Headsticks
- Allan Yn Y Fan
- Niamh Boadle
- NE3Folk
- Jaipur Kawa Brass Band
- Les Barker
- Sean Taylor
- Simply Soweto Encha
- The Driving Force
- Pamela Wyn-Shannon
- Shamus O'Blivion and the Megadeath Morrismen
- Thrill Collins

=== 2013 (14–16 June) ===
- Dick Gaughan
- Spiers & Boden
- Greg Russell & Ciaran Algar
- Seth Lakeman
- Mark Radcliffe & Foes
- Woody Mann
- African Entsha
- All Blacked Up Ceilidh Band
- Babajack
- The Backyard Devils
- Blue Horyzon
- The Boat Band
- Clutching at Straws
- Fosbrooks
- Gordie MacKeeman & His Rhythm Boys
- Golty Farabeau
- Headsticks
- Kye Sones
- The Liverpool Shanty Kings
- Maddocks & Bayes
- Moulettes
- NE3FOLK
- The Peace Artistes
- My Sweet Patootie
- The Roving Crows
- Dan Walsh & Christi Andropolis
- The Willows

=== 2012 (15–17 June) ===
Including

- Show of Hands
- Mark Radcliffe & the Big Figures
- All Blacked Up
- Les Barker
- Merry Hell
- The Toy Hearts
- Babajack
- Roving Crows
- Eddi Reader
- Glenn Tilbrook
- The BlueYellows

=== 2011 (17–19 June) ===
- Phil Maddocks
- Pilgrims' Way
- Andy Buckley
- Salty Dog
- The Tow Path Tipplers
- The Crazy Folk Band
- Sniggleheap
- Acoustak
- David Gibb and the Pony Club
- Steamhead and the Weavils
- Calico Jack
- Last Ones Out
- The Boat Band
- Wearside Jack
- Maxine Adelle
- Louisa James
- The Kane Sisters
- Edel Fox
- Hayley Strangelove
- Dai Thomas
- The Middlewich Paddies
- With Bob On Our Side
- The Generation
- No Dinosaurs
- Blackfingers
- Providence Jug Band
- Stan's Magic Foot
- Steven Doyle

=== 2010 (18–20 June) - 20th Anniversary Celebration ===
INCLUDING

- Stan's Magic Foot
- London Philharmonic Skiffle Orchestra
- Mabon
- Little Johnny England
- The Lonnie Doneghan Band
- Ken Nicol and Phil Cool
- Nigel Beck
- Queensbury Rules
- Show of Hands
- Pete Donegan
- Tom Palmer
- Peter Knight's Gigspanner

=== 2009 (19–21 June) ===
- The Family Mahone
- Blue Murder
- Ade Edmondson & The Bad Shepherds
- All Blacked Up & Baz Parkes
- Thea Gilmore
- Jim Moray
- Stan's Magic Foot
- The Rainbow Chasers
- Gina Le Faux
- Tom Doughty
- Greg Cave & The Village Band
- Ella Edmondson
- Vicki & Trefor
- Andrea Glass
- Rachel Harrington
- Liz and the Lizzettes
- Isambarde
- Zoox
- Acoustak
- Barron Brady
- Bill Malkin
- Breeze and Wilson
- Brendan Fahy
- Calico Jack
- Chloë
- Chris Layhe and Oyster
- Cold Flame
- Dave Dove
- Deportees
- Dominic Collins
- Dr Bob and the Wildboys
- Fiona Simpson and Brian Adams
- Full House
- Geoff Mather
- Guitar Mal
- Holy Maggots
- James & the Giant
- Jaywalkers
- Jonathan Tarplee
- JP Slidewell
- Kavona
- Last Ones Out
- Lorelei Loveridge
- Lost in the Mist
- Madcap
- Men in Black
- Michelle Martin
- Nigel Beck
- Peter Butler
- Picnic Area
- Providence Jug Band
- Salt Town Poets
- Shake the Barley
- Song & Story
- The Huers
- Thom Kirkpatrick
- Time Bandits

=== 2008 (13–15 June) ===
Including

- June Tabor
- The Family Mahone
- Martin Simpson
- Bandersnatch
- Kerfuffle
- Peatbog Faeries
- Nick Barraclough and the Burglars
- Lau
- Rory Ellis
- Zoe Mulford
- The Warsaw Village Band
- Stomp
- Nick Harper
- Jonathan Kelly

=== 2007 (15–17 June) ===
- Seth Lakeman
- Elbow Jane and Dave Dove
- The Family Mahone with Mark Radcliffe
- Dave Hunt and Happenstance.
- Blazin’ Fiddles
- Queensberry Rules
- Ashley Hutchings and Rainbow Chasers
- The Demon Barber Roadshow
- Breeze & Wilson
- Full House
- Peeping Tom and caller Mick Peat.
- The New Rope String Band
- Richard Digance
- Show of Hands
- De Develeski
- PJ Wright and Thom Kirkpatrick

=== 2006 (16–18 June) ===
- The Stereo Graffiti Show with Darren Poyzer and Friends
- Tommy Kirkpatrick and the Beautiful Noise
- The Dylan Project
- Tom Doughty
- PJ Wright and Dave Pegg
- Karine Polwart
- CrossCurrent
- Michael McGoldrick and His Band
- Emma and The Professor
- Hazel O'Connor
- A Woman's Word
- McDermott's
- The Levellers
- The Family Mahone
- Darren Poyzer
- Ann English
- Kirsty McGee
- Dear Gregory
- All Blacked Up
- Cave
- Martin Eden and The Assembly Boys

=== 2005 (17–19 June) ===
- Queensberry Rules
- Uiscedwr
- The Family Mahone
- Mostly Autumn
- Bellowhead
- Jez Lowe and the Bad Pennies
- Kerfuffle
- Martin Carthy
- Eddi Reader
- Tickled Pink
- Brian Kennedy
- Eliza Carthy
- The Ratcatchers

=== 2004 (18–20 June) ===
- Fairport Convention
- The Family Mahone
- Simon Mayor
- Hilary James
- Shooglenifty
- Baker's Fabulous Boys
- Show of Hands
- The Levellers

=== 2003 (13–15 June) ===
- Bob Geldof
- The Family Mahone
- John Wright, Gary Forrest and Serious Kitchen
- Whapweasel
- Gordon Potts
- The New John Wright Band
- Ian Bruce
- Kirsty McGee
- Te Vaka
- Rick Roser
- Waterson–Carthy
- Les Barker
- Jim Moray
- The Oysterband
- Eliza Carthy Band
- Sean Cannon

=== 2002 (14–16 June) ===
- Fairport Convention
- Lindisfarne
- Kate Rusby
- Black Umfolosi
- Andy Cutting and Chris Wood
- Isla St Clair
- e2k
- Cara Dillon
- Kathryn Robert and Sean Lakeman
- Jon Boden and John Spiers
- Whorticulture
- Jenny Butterworth
- Jon Brindley
- Emily Slade
- Hot Tamales
- Aphrodite
- Jug O' Punch
- Steamhead
- Taggart and Wright
- Trefor and Vicki Williams
- Roam
- Quartz
- Ailsa and John Booth
- Brass Tacks
- The Family Mahone
- The Peace Artistes
- Root Chord
- Odd at Ease
- Tom Brown and Ian Goodier
- South Cheshire Pipe Band
- Elle Osbourne
- Sarah Hayes
- The Middlewich Paddies

=== 2001 (15–17 June – cancelled) ===
Cancelled due to Foot-and-mouth disease.

=== 2000 (16–18 June) ===
- Vin Garbutt
- Iron Horse
- Te Vaka
- Roy Bailey and John Kirkpatrick
- Blue Horses
- Show of Hands
- Les Barker
- Blowzabella
- Loctup Together
- Jenny Butterworth
- Cuckoo Oak
- Seize the Day
- Dragonfall
- The Family Mahone
- Slip Jig
- Karen Burton
- Tania Opland and Mike Freeman
- Bob Webb
- Calico Jack
- Steamhead
- Bakers Fabulous Boys
- Ceolta
- The National Youth Folklore Troupe of England
- John Barden
- Roy Clinging
- Davian Reel
- Quartz
- St Patrick's Pipe Band
- The Middlewich Paddies

=== 1999 (18–20 June) ===
- Cherish the Ladies
- Black Umfolosi
- The Poozies
- Tanglefoot
- The Old Rope String Band
- Cock and Bull
- The Oldham Tinkers
- Bernard Wrigley
- Ian Bruce
- The Boat Band
- Acquiesce
- The Middlewich Paddies
- The Chipolatas
- St. Patrick's Pipe Band
- Keeper's Lock
- Steamhead
- Davian Reel
- Roy Wilcock & Bridget Guest
- Lorebreakers

=== 1998 (19–21 June) ===
- Dervish
- The Albion Band
- Chris While and Julie Matthews
- Artisan
- Tanglefoot
- Huw and Tony Williams
- Cock and Bull Band
- The Peace Artists
- Calico Jack
- Davian Reel
- Moorland Folk
- Buzz & Sam Collins
- Stanley Accrington
- The Middlewich Paddies
- Chris Sherburn and Denny Bartley
- Flakey Jake and The Steamin Locos
- John Conolly and Pete Sumner
- Fiona Shirra
- Acquiesce
- The Salt Town Poets
- Ian Goodier and Tom Browne
- Steamhead
- Roy Wilcock and Bridget Guest
- The Lorebreakers
- Biggles Wartime Jug Band
- The Ram Shanty Crew
- Silk Brass

=== 1997 (20–22 June) ===
- The Yetties
- Coope Boyes and Simpson
- Big Jig
- The Boat Band
- Anam - Flook!
- The Geckoes
- Jez Lowe and The Bad Pennies
- Crook
- Sears and Harrison
- Davian Reel
- Gavin Lewery and Jock Tyldesley
- Les Barker
- To Hell with Burgundy
- The Middlewich Paddies
- Calico Jack
- Youthquake
- Salt Town Poets
- The Chipolatas
- Gilly Darby
- Chew the Roots
- Harvey Andrews

=== 1996 (14–16 June) ===
- After Hours
- Cosmotheka
- Calico Jack
- Gary and Vera Aspey
- Five Speed Box
- New Bushbury Mountain Daredevils
- Chris Sherbourn and Denny Bartley
- The Southgators
- Keith Donnelly
- Risky Business
- The Middlewich Paddies
- Jenny Shotliffe and Youthquake
- The Great Bonzo and Doris
- Dave Roberts
- Circus Sensible
- Paul and Glen Elliot
