= Middleditch =

Middleditch is an English surname.

Notable people with the name include:

- Bernard Middleditch (1870–1949), English footballer
- Edward Middleditch (1923–1987), English painter
- Ken Middleditch (1925–2021), English speedway rider
- Neil Middleditch (born 1957), British former speedway rider and team manager of the Poole Pirates
- Thomas Middleditch (born 1982), Canadian actor and television writer

== See also ==
- Middleditch and Schwartz, American improv comedy TV series
- Middlewich (disambiguation)
