= Skirball Center =

Skirball Center may refer to:

- Skirball Cultural Center, Los Angeles
- Skirball Center for the Performing Arts, New York
