= Randy Cunningham: 9th Grade Ninja =

Animated television series

- Genre: Superhero; Action; Comedy
- Created by: Jed Elinoff; Scott Thomas
- Directed by: Shaun Cashman
- Voices of: Ben Schwartz; Andrew Caldwell; Tim Curry; Ben Cross; John DiMaggio; Kevin Michael Richardson
- Theme music composer: Brad Breeck
- Composer: Brad Breeck
- Countries of origin: United States; United Kingdom; Ireland
- Original language: English
- No. of seasons: 2
- No. of episodes: 50 (100 segments) (list of episodes)

Production
- Executive producers: Jed Elinoff; Scott Thomas
- Running time: 22 minutes (11 minutes per segment)
- Production companies: Titmouse, Inc.; Boulder Media Limited

Original release
- Network: Disney XD
- Release: August 13, 2012 – July 27, 2015

Randy Cunningham: 9th Grade Ninja is an animated television series created by Jed Elinoff and Scott Thomas for Disney XD. It was produced by Titmouse, Inc., and Boulder Media Limited for Disney's London-based content hub. Many of the character designs were supplied by Jhonen Vasquez, the creator of Invader Zim. The first episode premiered on Disney XD on August 13, 2012, and the final episode premiered on July 27, 2015. Voice direction for the series was done by Ginny McSwain. Shaun Cashman was the supervising director.

The show's pilot and bible was leaked online at 4chan, in April 2024.

== Plot ==
A town called Norrisville has been protected by a ninja for 800 years, but what the citizens of Norrisville do not know is that a new ninja is selected every four years. Randy Cunningham, a teenage boy who is a freshman at Norrisville High School, is the next ninja. Now, Randy must protect Norrisville from the evil plans of the Sorcerer, his ally Hannibal McFist, and Hannibal's assistant Willem Viceroy.

== Characters ==
=== Main characters ===
- Randall "Randy" Cunningham / Ninja (voiced by Ben Schwartz) – A Norrisville High freshman who was chosen to be the "Ninja", a mystic warrior who protects the school and the city from any danger that threatens the safety of people. Randy is depicted as being lazy yet outgoing and humorous, displaying a witty sense of humor, but he also strives to do what is right no matter what while going through the typical day-to-day life of a teenager.
- Howard Weinerman (voiced by Andrew Caldwell) – Howard is Randy's overweight, rude, and troublesome Jewish best friend and the only one who knows his secret identity as the Ninja.

=== Villains ===
- The Sorcerer (voiced by Tim Curry in season 1, Ben Cross in season 2) – An 800-year-old master of the dark arts who is determined to destroy his nemesis, the Ninja. At the beginning of the 13th century, the Sorcerer was imprisoned in a hole that is now located beneath Norrisville High School. The Sorcerer's main weapon is "stank", a magical ability that he uses to temporarily turn people into monsters.
- Hannibal McFist (voiced by John DiMaggio) – The owner and CEO of McFist Industries and the Ninja's archenemy. While everyone in Norrisville views McFist as a benevolent businessman, he has secretly made a deal to help the Sorcerer destroy the Ninja in exchange for the power of McFist's choosing. When Stankified by the Sorcerer, he becomes a large blue crab-like monster with long hair and his brain becomes a sentient red claw.
- Willem Viceroy III (voiced by Kevin Michael Richardson) – Viceroy is a scientist that works at McFist Industries and is responsible for all robots that attack the Ninja.
  - Psycho-Bot (voiced by Kevin Michael Richardson) – A robotic scorpion programmed to copy the moves of the ninja and emotions.
  - Robo-Apes (voiced by John DiMaggio) – A group of robotic gorillas.
  - Krackenstein (voiced by Fred Tatasciore) – A Frankenstein-like robot with six arms who is the first robot to be shown in the series.
  - Punkbots (voiced by Billy Idol in season 1 and Robin Atkin Downes in season 2) – Three robots created to rouse the McSatchlé Store as part of their latest plan to destroy the ninja. The Punkbots appear in the second season as the rulers of Scrap City.
  - Ninja-bot – A robot version of the ninja who has the same abilities as the ninja.
  - Steve Riley – A robot who disguised itself as one of Flackville High School's chess players. He was programmed with every chess move ever played and single-handedly defeated the whole Norrisville High Chess Team.
  - Franz Nukid (voiced by Carlos Alazraqui) – A robot created to infiltrate the school and learn the Ninja's identity.
  - Slaying Mantis – A robotic mantis who is sent to attack the ninja during his vacation.
  - Rhinosaurus – A robotic rhinoceros who can release gas and summons anyone's worst nightmare.
  - Robo-Elves – Robotic elves who serves as security guards in the Christmas Party of McFist.
  - Robo-Snowman – A robotic snowman who is used to destroy the ninja in the Christmas Party.
  - Robo-Frog – A robotic frog.
  - Robo-Spiders – A robotic spider.
  - Robo-Snakes – A robotic snake.
  - Robo-Lizard – A robotic chameleon.
  - Robo-Cyclops – A cycloptic robot.
- Jerry Driscoll (voiced by Andy Dick) – Mrs. Driscoll's deceased mad scientist husband, who spent his time building doomsday devices that could destroy the world and the universe when he was alive. Driscoll now carries his skeleton around at all times.
- The Disciplinarian (voiced by Andy Richter) – The tour guide for Detention Island. He hates cheating and will go out of his way to try to kill cheaters if they are on his island.
- Mac Antfee (voiced by David Koechner) – A former Ninja who operated in the 1980s and was stripped of the ninja suit after being "condemned for conduct unbecoming of a ninja".
  - Man-Gong – Mac Antfee's right-hand man.
- Catfish Booray (voiced by Jim Cummings) – A psychotic Cajun swamp man who lives in the swamp behind the school.
- The Sorceress (voiced by Jennifer Tilly) – The Sorcerer's girlfriend. Like the Sorcerer, she can use the "stank" ability as well.
- Evil Julian (voiced by Dee Bradley Baker) – Evil Julian is an evil version of Julian who was created when Julian came in contact with one of the Sorcerer's Power Balls.
- Brawn Brickwall (voiced by Matt Berry) – A famous author, hunter, and adventurer from Norrisville.
- Todd Principal/PAL (voiced by Paul Reubens) – A program created by the Norrisville high school board to ensure the kids to behave in class.
- Queen Gabnidine (voiced by Jon Lovitz) – The Queen of the Intraterrestrials from The Evil Mantle-Dwellers. She has the odd verbal tic of ending nearly all her sentences with a long drawn-out, "Riiiiiiiiiiiiiiight?" She is just a made up person by Howard.
- Whoopee 2 (voiced by Bill Hader) – An evil version of Whoopee who is built by Viceroy replacing the original.
- NomiRandy (voiced by Ben Schwartz) – An alternate Randy created by the Nomicon to teach him a lesson about balance.
- Halloweenja – The Ninja's suit infused with power, who can turn anything to horrors.

=== Recurring characters ===
- Beauregarde "Bucky" O'Brien (voiced by Scott Menville) – A wimpy and often bullied, unpopular student of Norrisville High who is a member of the school's marching band, in which he plays the triangle. He always makes jokes or comebacks, followed up with a "Zing!". Howard doesn't like him yet Randy enjoys his company. Bucky is shown to be vulnerable enough to be turned into a purple fish-like monster with long eyes by the Sorcerer constantly.
- Bashford "Bash" Johnson (voiced by Dave Wittenberg) – A school bully who is the Norrisville High football team's "Crushin' Carp" quarterback as well as being McFist's stepson. When Stankified by the Sorcerer, he is transformed into a yellow monster with large arms.
- Heidi Weinerman (voiced by Cassie Scerbo) – Howard's atttactive, stylish, and popular older sister and the host of "Heidi@School!", an online gossip report that focuses on current events in both Norrisville High School and in Norrisville. Heidi is generally depicted as the school's queen bee due to her high social status and her self-important, egotistical attitude, hence why Howard often enjoys messing with her. As a running gag, she mispronounces Randy's name. When Stankified by the Sorceress, she is transformed into a blue dog-like creature.
- Theresa Fowler (voiced by Sarah Hyland from season 1-2, Grey DeLisle in Winner Takes Ball) – A shy, clumsy, and unpopular Norrisville High student who also has a crush on Randy, who appears to like her as well. When she is Stankified by the Sorcerer, she is transformed into a green plant-like monster.
- Debbie Kang (voiced by Piper Curda) – An intelligent and hardworking straight-A student who is an aspiring journalist, serving as the chief writer for the Norrisville High School's school newspaper, but has a bossy personality and shares has a rivalry with Heidi. Debbie is also best friends with Theresa, sharing many of the same girly interests as her, although she doesn't get along with Randy and Howard despite Theresa's insistence. She is among the few people aside from Howard who knows Randy is the Ninja. When Debbie is Stankified by the Sorcerer, she is transformed into a porcupine-like monster.
- Principal Irving Slimovitz (voiced by Jim Rash) – The nervous yet optimistic principal of Norrisville High School. When he was stankified by the Sorcerer, Irving turns into a tiger-like creature.
- Marcie McFist (voiced by April Stewart) – The perky yet easily annoyed wife of Hannibal McFist and mother of Bash Johnson.
- Doug (voiced by Scott Thomas) – A Norrisville High student. When Stankified by the Sorcerer, he becomes a carp-like monster.
- Flute Girl (voiced by Grey DeLisle) – Nerdy girl who plays the flute in the Norrisville High marching band. She has been stankified into three different forms: the first one was a two-headed one-legged monster (when combined with Stevens), the second was a Tyrannosaurus-like creature, and the third was a purple dog-like creature.
- Rachel (voiced by Laura Marano) – The clarinet player in the Norrisville High marching band. When Stankified by the Sorcerer, Rachel is transformed into an enormous cat monster.
- Stevens (voiced by Tom Kenny) – The trombone player in the Norrisville High marching band, he always wears sunglasses and hardly talks. When he was Stankified by the Sorcerer, he combined with Flute Girl to form a two-headed one-legged monster.
- Julian (voiced by Dee Bradley Baker) – A goth student who is seen wearing a purple top hat, a purple suit, and sports vampiric features such as false fangs. Whenever he is Stankified by the Sorcerer, he is transformed into a spider-like monster.
- Coach Green (voiced by John Oliver) – Randy and Howard's insane gym teacher as well as Norrisville High's "Wave Slayers" water ski team coach.
- Morgan Belding (voiced by Kari Wahlgren) – The leader of Norrisville High's "Dancing Fish" dance squad, Morgan is a popular girl with a punk-inspired look, a snarky attitude and a smug voice. Later episodes reveal that Howard has an unrequited crush on her, as opposed to Theresa's crush on Randy. When Morgan's entire group (except herself) is stankified by the Sorcerer, they turn into multicolored shark-like creatures. When Stankified by the Sorceress, she is transformed into a green dog-like creature.
- S. Thomas Smith (voiced by John Witherspoon in season 1 and Gary Anthony Williams in season 2) – The blind metal shop teacher at Norrisville High School and swordsmith.
- Mrs. Marlene Driscoll (voiced by Megan Mullally) – Randy and Howard's science teacher. She keeps the bones of her dead husband and likes to talk through him like a ventriloquist dummy.
- Pradeep (voiced by Parvesh Cheena) – An Indian-American student who plays the French horn in the Norrisville High marching band. When he is Stankified by the Sorcerer, he is transformed into a green monster.

=== Other characters ===
- Mr. Bannister (voiced by Neil Flynn) – Randy and Howard's strict English teacher at Norrisville High who particularly does not like Howard (and vice-versa).
- Ms. Crabapple (voiced by Grey DeLisle) – The strict and militant music teacher and coach of the Norrisville High marching band.
- Mick (voiced by John DiMaggio) – A football player on Norrisville High School's football team who is Bash Johnson's best friend.
- Juggo (voiced by Dee Bradley Baker) – A student at Norrisville High School who dresses like a clown every day. His known talent is juggling while on a unicycle. When he is Stankified by the Sorcerer, he is transformed into a four-armed clown monster with long eyes and sharp teeth.
- Dave (voiced by Carlos Alazraqui) – An accordion player at Norrisville High School and one of Randy's friends. When he is Stankified by the Sorcerer, he is transformed into a thin blue humanoid monster with accordion-like arms.
- Mort Weinerman (voiced by Richard Kind) – The father of Howard and Heidi Weinerman who works at McFist Industries.
- Gene Levine (voiced by John DiMaggio) – An exterminator who helps Viceroy dispose of a few unwanted monster blob creations. He also worked as a Shopkeeper, Builder, and a Home Mover
- Greg (voiced by Keith Ferguson) – Greg is a worker at the video arcade called "Greg's Game Hole." When Stankified by the Sorcerer, Greg becomes an arcade machine monster. His character is based on Matthew McConaughey in the movie Dazed and Confused.
- Señora Jorge (voiced by Judy Reyes) – Randy's and Howard's Spanish teacher.
- Dickie (voiced by Bobcat Goldthwait) – A student at Norrisville High School in 1985 who got Stankified by the Sorcerer after mistakenly believing that his girlfriend had stood him up. He was frozen by Mac Antfee and was thawed out years later when Randy and Howard unknowingly free his monster form and De-Stankify him. When Dickie couldn't cope with how much has happened, he got Re-Stankified by the Sorcerer. Only by Randy and Howard reuniting him with his girlfriend Mary did Dickie get Un-Stankified and aged to adulthood.
- Ms. Mary Elizabeth "Tawny" Zingwald (voiced by Annie Potts) – The poetry teacher at Norrisville High School with ankle-length hair.
- Jacques (voiced by Rob Paulsen) – A foreign exchange student from France. He becomes a monkey-like monster after The Ninja humiliates him in front of the school enough for the Sorcerer to Stankify him.
- Buttermaker (voiced by Sterling Knight) – A jock at Norrisville High School who is the captain of the Wave Slayers. When he is Stankified by the Sorcerer, he becomes an olive green aquatic monster with four arms and four legs.
- Brent (voiced by Jason Earles) – A student at Norrisville High School who is the protege of S. Thomas Smith and one of Randy's friends. When Stankified by the Sorcerer, he becomes a goblin-like monster in samurai armor.
- Pitch Kickham (voiced by Simon Pegg) – A superstar soccer player.
- Terry McFist (voiced by Steve Zahn) – Hannibal McFist's hippie big brother and the true heir to McFist Industries.
- Stanley Bagel (voiced by Gilbert Gottfried) – Stanley is a student who served as a background character for most of the show.
- First Ninja (voiced by Joel McHale) – The first ninja was the last ninja from the Norisu Nine who became the first Norrisville Ninja and trapped the Sorcerer underground.
- Sinjin Knightfire (voiced by Nat Faxon) – Sinjin Knightfire is a magician and the owner of the Magic Funporium. When Stankified by the Sorcerer, he becomes a magician-themed monster.
- Jason Myers (voiced by Robert Englund) – Also known as Mudfart, Jason Myers was a student at Norrisville High in 1993.
- Rudd Rhymez (voiced by David Alan Grier) – A Rapper and Leader of his Posse at Norrisville.
- Tiny Timmy Scratch-It (voiced by Biz Markie) – The DJ of the Rapper Rudd Rhymez and a member of his posse.
- Plop-Plop (voiced by Adam Pally) – The Esquire of the First Ninja and the Guardian of the Sorcerer Ball.
- Levander Hart (voiced by Danny Pudi) – A Norrisville student and was a member of the 30 Seconds to Math. He got stanked after hearing Randy and Howard kicking him out of the group and suddenly became a rock star by himself.
- The Kev (voiced by Pauly Shore) – The owner of Club Kev, a resort in Lake LaRusso.
- Charlie Cluckers (voiced by Chris Parnell) – The founder, owner, and operator of the food chain Charlie Clucker's Chicken.
- PJ McFlubbusters Manager (voiced by John O'Hurley) – White-haired, uses a wheelchair and wears a blue tuxedo.
- Ninja of '05 (voiced by Patrick Warburton) – Muscular guy and Ninja of 2005.
- The Creep (voiced by Bruce Campbell) – Messenger who delivers the Ninjanomicon and Ninja-Mask to whoever is chosen to be the Ninja.
- Dr. Sam (voiced by Bill Hader) – A pediatrician who takes care of Randy.
- Rorg (voiced by Rob Riggle) – The protagonist of the television series Rorg: A Hero of the Past. Rorg is a parody of He-Man and Lion-O.
- Socko (voiced by Kenan Thompson) – Rorg's sidekick.
- Ruth (voiced by Elaine Stritch) – Mother of Marcie McFist.
- Brock Octane (voiced by Kevin Michael Richardson) – A popular action movie star loosely based on stars like Vin Diesel and Dwayne Johnson.
- Mrs. Dempsey (voiced by Grey DeLisle) – A cafeteria worker at the school.
- Sundown (voiced by Fred Tatasciore) – A janitor who has an Austrian accent.
- Superintendent (voiced by Ice-T) – The leader of the school board.
- Shopkeeper (voiced by James Hong) – A gift shop clerk in Little Norrisville.
- Neil Apestrong - Norrisville's astronaut and the first animal to go into space. His name is obviously based on Neil Armstrong.
- Q.T. Bot / Dale (voiced by Rob Riggle) – A robot from Scrap City who is embarrassed by his name.

== Episodes ==
Season	Segments	Episodes	Originally released	
Season	Segments	Episodes	First released	Last released
1	52	26	August 13, 2012	February 8, 2014
2	48	24	July 19, 2014	July 27, 2015

== Broadcast ==
A preview of Randy Cunningham: 9th Grade Ninja aired on Disney XD on August 13, 2012. The official premiere was on September 17, 2012. Disney XD premiered the series on September 29, 2012, in Canada. The series premiered on October 4, 2012, on Disney XD in the UK and Ireland. It premiered in Australia on December 10, 2012, on Disney Channel and on April 10, 2014, on Disney XD.

== Reception ==
=== Critical reception ===
Emily Ashby of Common Sense Media gave the show 2 out of 5 stars; writing that "violence isn't bloody and typically doesn't result in human injury, it won't have an upsetting effect on tweens". She also said that "there's a mild sexual tone to some of the content, including some innuendo and partial rear nudity on guys and revealing clothing on female characters", but she claims that "the series touches on relevant social issues like status and striving to fit in, so there's a fair amount of content you can talk about with your tweens afterward".
