= Ben Schwartz =

American actor and comedian (born 1981)

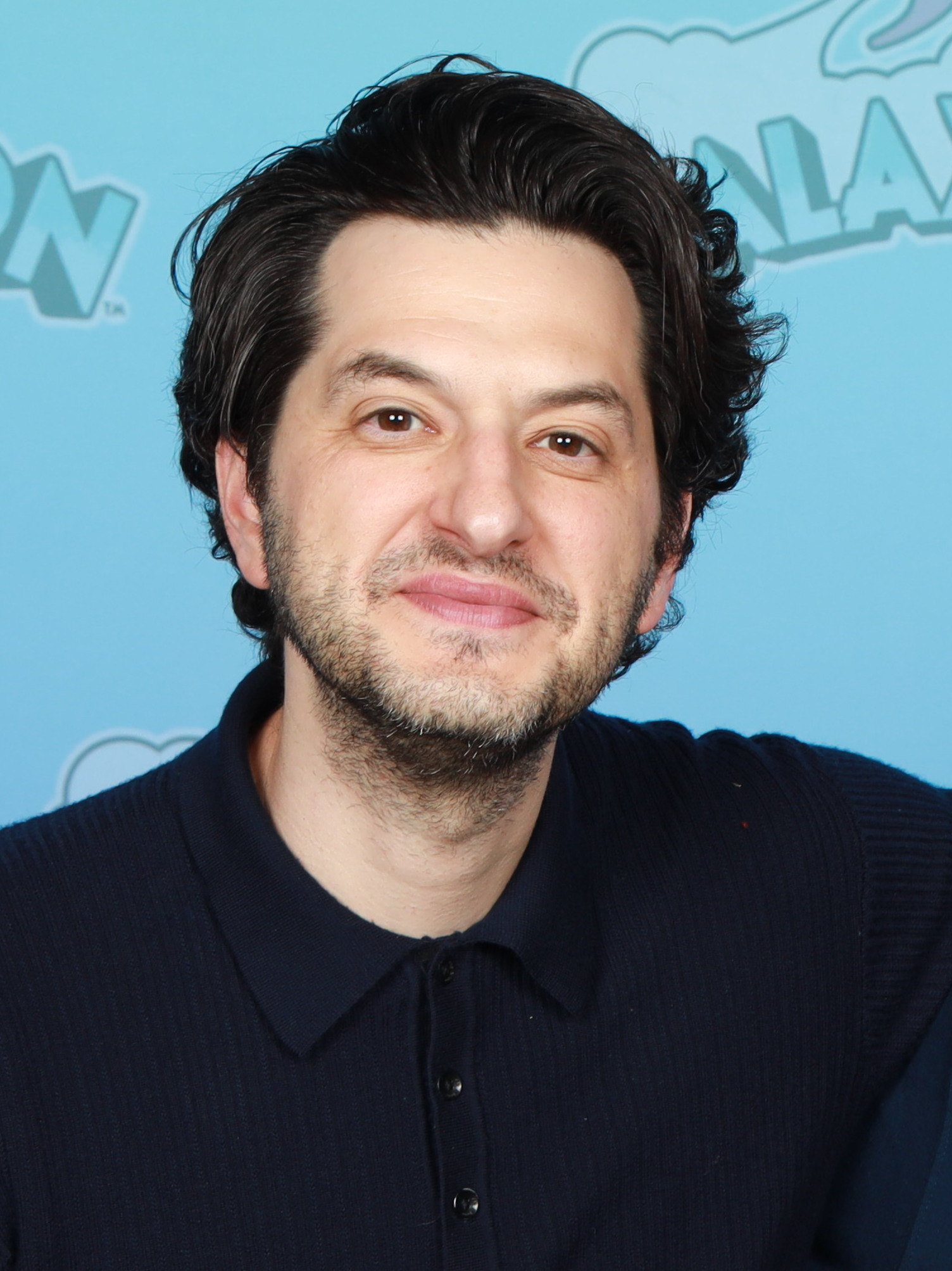
- Schwartz at the 2025 GalaxyCon Columbus
- Born: Benjamin Joseph Schwartz; September 15, 1981 (age 45); New York City, U.S.
- Education: Union College (BA)
- Occupations: Actor; comedian; writer; producer
- Years active: 2006–present
- Website: www.rejectedjokes.com

Benjamin Joseph Schwartz (born September 15, 1981) is an American actor, comedian, writer, and producer. He played a recurring role as Jean-Ralphio Saperstein on the NBC sitcom Parks and Recreation, a starring role as Clyde Oberholt on the Showtime series House of Lies, and voiced roles as Randy Cunningham in Randy Cunningham: 9th Grade Ninja, Dewey Duck in DuckTales, Leonardo in Rise of the Teenage Mutant Ninja Turtles, and Sonic the Hedgehog in the eponymous film series. He also appeared many times in the CollegeHumor web series Jake and Amir.

His film career also includes roles in Peep World; Everybody's Fine; The Other Guys; Transformers: Age of Extinction; The Walk; This Is Where I Leave You; Standing Up, Falling Down; and Flora & Ulysses. On television, he has starred in the Netflix comedy series Space Force (2020–2022) and the Apple TV+ murder mystery comedy series The Afterparty (2022–2023). He also voiced in the Netflix interactive special We Lost Our Human as Pud. Aside from his on-screen roles, Schwartz is known as an improv comedian, touring as Ben Schwartz & Friends with recurring guests including Colton Dunn and Drew Tarver and making regular appearances on the podcast Comedy Bang! Bang!.

== Early life and education ==
Benjamin Joseph Schwartz was born on September 15, 1981, in The Bronx, New York City, to a Jewish family. His parents, both Bronx natives, raised Schwartz in Riverdale, the Bronx. His father was a social worker before going into real estate, and his mother was a music teacher at P.S. 24, an elementary school in Riverdale. He also has an older sister.

When he was eleven years old, his family moved to Edgemont, New York, in adjacent Westchester County. Schwartz attended Edgemont Junior–Senior High School where he played basketball and sang in the chorus; he graduated in 1999. He then attended Union College, graduating in 2003 with a double major in psychology and anthropology.

== Career ==
=== 2006–2015: Early roles and voice acting ===
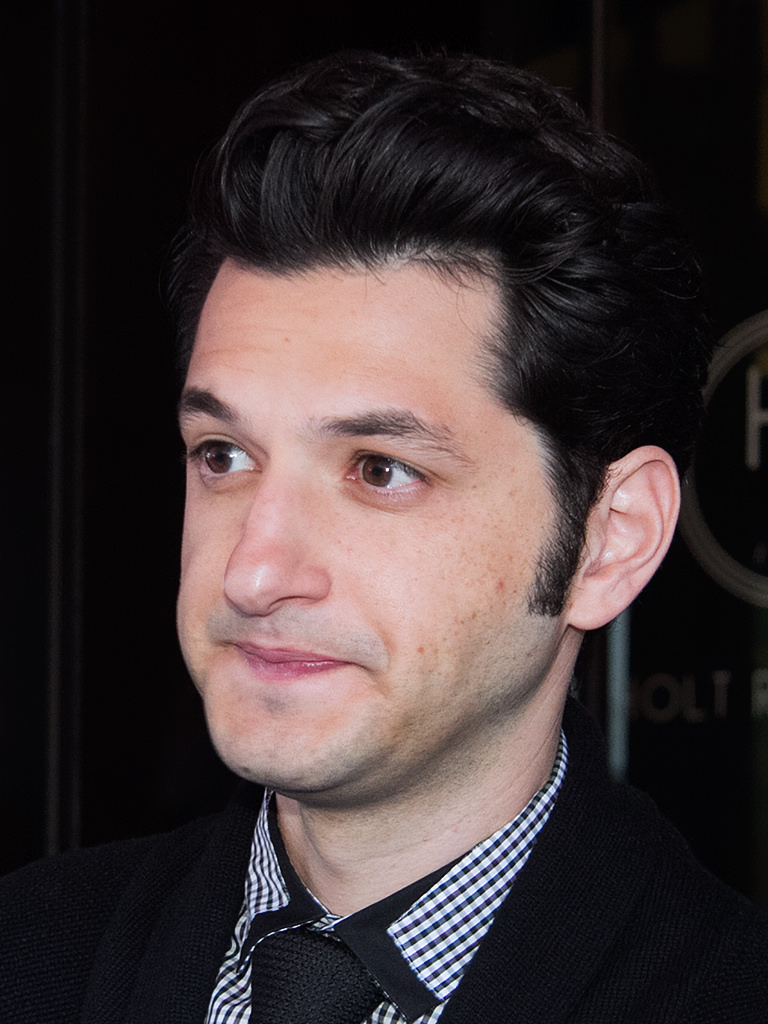
Schwartz in 2014

On television, Schwartz guest-starred as Jean-Ralphio Saperstein on NBC's Parks and Recreation and was a lead in the Showtime show House of Lies. In 2010, Schwartz played series regular Bill Hoyt on J. J. Abrams' one-hour spy drama Undercovers for NBC.

Schwartz had his own segment on HBO's Funny or Die Presents called Terrible Decisions with Ben Schwartz and has appeared in multiple CollegeHumor sketches including the popular web series Jake and Amir.

Schwartz has been nominated for four Emmys and won the 2009 Emmy Award for Outstanding Original Music and Lyrics for coauthoring Hugh Jackman's opening number for the 81st Academy Awards.

Schwartz voiced Randy Cunningham, a 14-year-old freshman student and ninja protecting his hometown Norrisville from forces of evil in Randy Cunningham: 9th Grade Ninja.

In September 2013, he was hired by Paramount Pictures to re-make the 1991 comedy Soapdish, retitled El Fuego Caliente and reworking the original's American soap opera into a Latin telenovela, with producers Rob Reiner and Alan Greisman and he sold an original pitch to Universal Studios based on an idea by Brian Grazer with Imagine Entertainment attached to produce. He was a staff writer for the third season of Adult Swim's Robot Chicken and served as a freelance writer for the Weekend Update segment of Saturday Night Live as well as the monologues for the Late Show with David Letterman.

Schwartz is an alumnus of the Upright Citizens Brigade Theatre (UCBT). He was a member of the improv group "Hot Sauce" with Adam Pally and Gil Ozeri. The group performed their long-form improv show "Something Fresh" at UCBT every month.

He and Bill Hader served as vocal consultants for Star Wars: The Force Awakens. Schwartz also played a Stormtrooper in the film.

Since 2014, Schwartz has appeared in episodes of the Comedy Bang! Bang! podcast as the only guest in "Solo Bolo" (2014), "Solo Bolo Dos Lo" (2015), "Solo Bolo Trolo" (2016), "Solo Bolo Cuatrolo" (2016), "Solo Bolo Cincolo" (2017), "Solo Bolo Sonicolo" (2020), "Solo Bolo Hallowolo" (2021), and "Solo Bolo Ho Ho Holo" (2024). In nearly each episode he and host Scott Aukerman compete in the Olympic Song Challenge. Ben has also appeared on episodes of comedy podcasts If I Were You, ID1OT, You Made It Weird with Pete Holmes, and Conan O'Brien Needs a Friend.

=== 2016–present: Animation and film roles ===
Ben Schwartz in 2025

In 2017, Schwartz began voicing Dewey Duck in the Disney XD revival of DuckTales. Schwartz has been featured as himself in Netflix's Home: Adventures with Tip & Oh's 2017 animated Christmas special - Home for the Holidays - alongside Kelly Clarkson. He provided the voice of Leonardo in Rise of the Teenage Mutant Ninja Turtles. In August 2018, Schwartz was announced to voice the titular character in the 2020 film Sonic the Hedgehog.

On September 26, 2019, it was announced that Schwartz was cast as F. Tony Scarapiducci in the Netflix comedy series Space Force.

Ben Schwartz co-starred alongside Billy Crystal in the film Standing Up, Falling Down, initially released on April 25, 2019.

In April 2020, Schwartz and fellow comedian Thomas Middleditch starred in Netflix's first long-form improv special, Middleditch and Schwartz, a three-part series of hour-long performances filmed at New York University's Skirball Center for the Performing Arts.

In 2022, Schwartz was in the main cast of the first season of the Apple TV+ mystery comedy series The Afterparty, reprising his role in a guest capacity in the series' 2023 second season.

In January 2023, Schwartz guest voiced a character, TAY-0, a droid who participates in races for Cid Scaleback, on Star Wars: The Bad Batch.

=== Books ===
Schwartz has co-written four books, three with writer Amanda McCall: Grandma's Dead: Breaking Bad News with Baby Animals; Maybe Your Leg Will Grow Back!: Looking on the Bright Side with Baby Animals and Why is Daddy in a Dress?: Asking Awkward Questions with Baby Animals and (with writer Laura Moses), Things You Should Already Know About Dating, You F-king Idiot.

== Filmography ==
=== Film ===
Year	Title	Role	Notes
2007	New York City Serenade	Russ	
2009	Mystery Team	Dougie's Buddy	
2009	I Hate Valentine's Day	Tammy's Date	
2009	Everybody's Fine	Writer	
2010	The Other Guys	Beaman's Assistant	
2010	Peep World	Nathan Meyerwitz	
2013	Turbo	Skidmark	Voice
2013	Coffee Town	Gino	
2013	Runner Runner	Craig	
2014	Happy Christmas	Party Guest	
2014	Better Living Through Chemistry	Noah	
2014	Transformers: Age of Extinction	Bumblebee	Radio Voice
2014	I'm a Mitzvah	David	Short film
2014	This Is Where I Leave You	Rabbi Charles "Boner" Grodner	
2014	The Interview	Eminem's Publicist	
2015	The Walk	Albert	
2015	Star Wars: The Force Awakens	BB-8 / Stormtrooper	Voice consultant
2016	The Intervention	Jack	
2017	How to Be a Latin Lover	Jimmy / Valet	
2017	Outside In	Ted	
2018	Happy Anniversary	Sam	
2018	Blue Iguana	Paul Driggs	
2018	An Actor Prepares	Jimmy	
2018	Monster Challenge	Himself	Short film
2018	Night School	Marvin	
2019	The Lego Movie 2: The Second Part	Banarnar	Voice Cameo
2019	Standing Up, Falling Down	Scott	
2020	Sonic the Hedgehog	Sonic the Hedgehog	Voice and facial motion-capture
2021	Music	Rudy	
2021	Flora & Ulysses	George Buckman	
2021	Rumble	Jimothy Brett-Chadley III	Voice
2022	Sonic the Hedgehog 2	Sonic the Hedgehog	Voice
2022	Sonic Drone Home	Sonic the Hedgehog	Voice, short film
2022	DC League of Super-Pets	Mark	Voice
2022	Rise of the Teenage Mutant Ninja Turtles: The Movie	Leonardo, Janitor Man	Voice
2023	We Lost Our Human	Pud	Voice, interactive special
2023	Renfield	Teddy Lobo	
2024	A Very Sonic Christmas	Sonic the Hedgehog	Voice, short film
2024	Sonic the Hedgehog 3	Sonic the Hedgehog	Voice
2026	Mike & Nick & Nick & Alice	Symon	
2026	Bad Day	TBA	Post-production
2027	Sonic the Hedgehog 4	Sonic the Hedgehog	Voice; Post-production
2028	The Beatles – A Four-Film Cinematic Event	Murray the K	Filming

=== Television ===
Year	Title	Role	Notes
2006	Late Night with Conan O'Brien	Various	1 episode
2007	Starveillance	Glenn	Voice, 3 episodes
2007–2008	Bronx World Travelers	Ben	5 episodes; also producer and director
2008–2009	Mayne Street	Evan Mintz	10 episodes
2009	Intercourse With A Vampire	Waiter	1 episode
2009	Accidentally on Purpose	Max Silver	Episode: "Working Girl"
2009	Happiness Isn't Everything	Jacky Hamburger	Television film
2010	The Sarah Silverman Program	Writer	Episode: "A Slip Slope"
2010–2012	Undercovers	Bill Hoyt	Main cast; 13 episodes
2010–2015, 2020	Parks and Recreation	Jean-Ralphio Saperstein	22 episodes
2011	Funny or Die Presents	Ben	Segment: "Terrible Decisions"; also producer
2011	Mad	Narrator / Announcer / Jim Halpert	Voice, episode: "Ribbitless / The Clawfice"
2012	Tron: Uprising	Rilo	Voice, episode: "The Renegade"
2012–2016	House of Lies	Clyde Oberholt	Main cast; 58 episodes
2012–2015	Randy Cunningham: 9th Grade Ninja	Randy Cunningham/Ninja	Main voice cast; 50 episodes
2013	Arrested Development	John Beard Jr.	Episode: "Colony Collapse"
2013–2020	Bob's Burgers	Josh / Rick	Voice, 4 episodes
2013–2020	Robot Chicken	Roger Radcliffe / Scaredy Smurf / Dickwax / Oog / Zeeko	Voice, 3 episodes
2013–2016	Comedy Bang! Bang!	Rodney Wayber	4 episodes
2014	Wallykazam!	Skydasher Steve	Voice, episode: "The Big Goblin Problem"
2015–2019	BoJack Horseman	Rutabaga Rabitowitz	Voice, 8 episodes
2015	The Simpsons	Clerk	Voice, episode: "Cue Detective"
2015	Drunk History	Meyer Lansky	Episode: "Las Vegas"
2016–2017	Animals.	Antonio / Geoff	Voice, 2 episodes
2017	The New V.I.P.'s	Lenny	Cancelled pilot
2017	Hot Date	Rich Boyfriend	Episode: "Gold Diggers"
2017	Home: For The Holidays	Himself	Television film
2017–2021	DuckTales	Dewey Duck	Main voice cast; 69 episodes
2018	The Wrong Mans	Sam	Cancelled
2018	Medal of Honor	Vito Bertoldo	1 episode
2018–2019	Modern Family	Nick	3 episodes
2018–2020	Rise of the Teenage Mutant Ninja Turtles	Leo	Main voice cast; 39 episodes
2019	Ryan Hansen Solves Crimes on Television	Himself	Episode: "Execution Dependant"
2019	Pinky Malinky	Coach Freebird	Voice, episode: "Advanced"
2019	Bajillion Dollar Propertie$	Quistian Gayle	2 episodes
2019	Human Discoveries	Leader Elk	Voice, episode: "And Then They Discovered the Wheel"
2020	Middleditch and Schwartz	Various	Main cast, also creator; 3 episodes
2020–2021	American Dad!	Various	Voice, 3 episodes
2020–2021	Crossing Swords	Keefer	Voice, 2 episodes
2020–2022	Space Force	F. Tony Scarapiducci	Main cast; 17 episodes
2021	Earth to Ned	Himself	Episode: "Party Like It's Nineteen Ninety Ned"
2021	Calls	Andy	Voice, episode: "The Beginning"
2021	Bless the Harts	Bryce	Voice, episode: "Haul Force One"
2021	M.O.D.O.K.	Lou Tarleton	Main voice cast; 10 episodes
2021	HouseBroken	Various	Voice, 4 episodes
2021	Rugrats	Lord Crater	Voice, episode: "Final Eclipse"
2021–2022	Staged	Tom / Ben Schwartz / Bob Marley	5 episodes
2021–2022	Fairfax	Cody	Voice, 5 episodes
2022–2023	The Afterparty	Yasper E. Lennov	Main cast (season 1); guest role (season 2)
2022	The Boys Presents: Diabolical	Simon / Kingdom's Dad	Voice, 2 episodes
2022	Central Park	Various	Voice, 2 episodes
2023	Star Wars: The Bad Batch	TAY-0	Voice, episode: "Faster"
2023	Die Hart	Andre	7 episodes Nominated – Primetime Emmy Award for Outstanding Actor in a Short Form Comedy or Drama Series
2023	The Muppets Mayhem	Gus D'Vore	Episode: "Track 3: Exile on Main Street"
2023–present	Invincible	The Shapesmith / Rus Livingston, additional voices	Voice, seasons 2–present
2024	Knuckles	Sonic the Hedgehog	Voice, episode: "The Warrior"
2024	Baby Shark's Big Show!	Blizzard Wizard	Voice, episode: "Assembly Required"
2025	Chibiverse	Dewey Duck	Voice, 2 episodes
2025	Long Story Short	Noah Wapner	Voice, episode: "Kendra's Job"
2025	LEGO Star Wars: Rebuild the Galaxy: Pieces of the Past	Jaxxon	Voice, 2 episodes

=== Web series ===
Year	Title	Role	Notes
2007–14	CollegeHumor Originals	Hegie / Himself / Gino	13 episodes
2008–10	Hardly Working	Himself	5 episodes
2009–11	Terrible Decisions with Ben Schwartz	Himself	Also producer
2009–15	Jake and Amir	Himself, various characters	23 episodes
2012	Dorkly Originals	Hermit	1 episode: "Legend of Zelda Hermit Wants to Haggle (with Ben Schwartz)"; Voice
2012, 2017	Kevin Pollak's Chat Show	Himself / Guest	2 episodes: "143", "291"
2016	The Earliest Show	Josh Bath	6 episodes; also writer and director Nominated – Primetime Emmy Award for Outstanding Actor in a Short Form Comedy or Drama Series
2018	Lonely and Horny	Bernand	1 episode: "Game Night"
2018, 2020	Good Mythical Morning	Himself	2 episodes
2019–2024	Guest Grumps	Himself	5 episodes
2020–2023	The George Lucas Talk Show	Himself	6 episodes
2024, 2026	Make Some Noise	Himself	2 episodes: "A Basketball Player's Far Too Elaborate Free Throw Routine", "Ben, Lisa, and Colton Have a Party"

=== Video games ===
Year	Title	Voice role
2013	Turbo: Super Stunt Squad	Skidmark
