= The Tansads =

English band

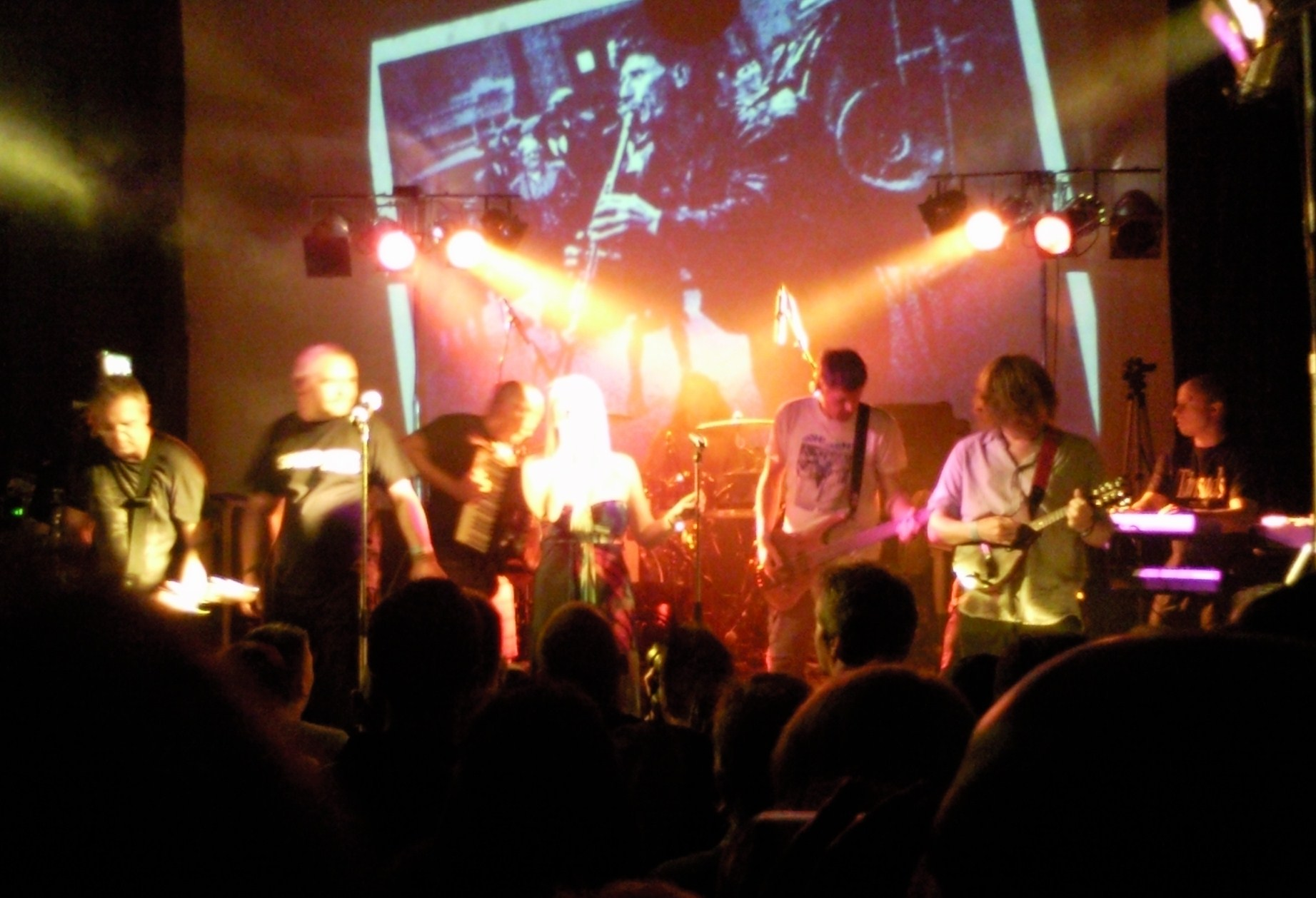
- The Tansads on stage at one of their 2010 reunion gigs. Visible from left to right: John Kettle, Andrew Kettle, Dominic Lowe, Janet Anderton, Phill Knight, Ed Jones, Bob Kettle, Lee Goulding

Background information
- Origin: Wigan, Greater Manchester, England
- Genres: Rock; Folk
- Years active: c.1990–c.2001
- Labels: Musidisc; Transatlantic Records
- Past members: See Band personnel section

The Tansads were an English band from Wigan, Greater Manchester, who were active during the 1990s. Playing a mix of folk, punk and indie music they developed a strong following on the festival circuit and on the crusty/traveller scene, but never managed to achieve a commercial breakthrough. Their ultimately unsuccessful career later became the subject of a book by former member Ed Jones.

== History ==
The Tansads formed in 1989, and debuted live on 26 March 1990 at Players. The core members of the group throughout their career were vocalist Janet Anderton and the three Kettle brothers: John (guitarist and principal songwriter), Bob (mandolin, guitar and harmonica) and Andrew, sometimes credited simply as "Kek" (vocalist). Anderton and Andrew Kettle shared lead vocals, with some tracks featuring one or other alone and others featuring the interplay of Anderton's clear voice with Kettle's raspy delivery. John Kettle had previously been the guitarist for the Volunteers. Anderton had previously been in a band called The Bonny Saloons with John and Bob. The name "Tansad" came from a brand of child's pushchair. The band's style blended elements of folk, punk and indie with lyrics generally focusing on the vagaries of Northern working-class life. The band was described as "urban folkies" and "anarcho-Celtic post-punk neo-folk seven-strong orchestra" in the press.

The band achieved significant local success in their home town of Wigan, and in the early 1990s were supported by another local band, The Verve (then simply Verve). At the time the two acts were seen as the two big names on the local Wigan scene. Other bands who supported the Tansads included Pulp, Cast and Kula Shaker. In 1991 they released their debut album Shandyland on an independent label, its title track featuring a lyric (reproduced on the album's front cover) which summed up their vision of Northern life and people: "Chips and egg would make them high/But God has poked them in the eye".

Two years later they released Up the Shirkers on the more established MusiDisc label, which had previously released the debut album by The Levellers, a band to whom the Tansads were often compared. Their chaotic, frenetic live shows were generating much interest, but they also began a series of regular line-up changes, with only Anderton and the three Kettle brothers remaining constant members. Guy Keegan, formerly of The Railway Children, was a member for one album.

In 1994, they moved to Transatlantic Records for the album Flock.

After 1995's live album Drag Down the Moon, the band went on hiatus. Three years later they returned with a stripped-down line-up featuring only Anderton and John Kettle from their heyday and a new sound which dispensed with the folk elements in favour of a more conventional indie rock sound. In March 1998, this line-up released the album Reason to Be on an independent label before disbanding. In 2001 there were reports that the band had reformed once again, with Anderton now replaced by a teenaged vocalist named Laura Follin, but no new recordings surfaced.

== Post-split ==
Former bass player Ed Jones, who returned to journalism after leaving the band in 1994, wrote a book, This is Pop: The Life and Times of a Failed Rock Star, detailing his time in the band and the personality clashes which he felt caused their career to fail.

John Kettle works as a producer in his own studio called Jaraf House Studios and, along with producing songs for notable local talent, he has been working on new recordings with his brothers and former band members under the name Merry Hell. As of 2026 Merry Hell have released seven albums.

== Reunion gigs ==
Following months of speculation on their Facebook page, the band announced on their official website that they would be playing two reunion gigs in July 2010 at The Citadel in St Helens, to celebrate the 20th anniversary of their first ever gigs. Shortly afterwards, a third date was added. Thirteen past members of the band appeared at the gigs.

== Band personnel ==
Album	Line-up
Shandyland (1991)	Andrew Kettle – vocals Bob Kettle – harmonica, mandolin, guitar John Kettle – guitar Janet Anderton – vocals Ed Jones – bass "Cudo" (Paul McKeown) – percussion, vocals "Shrub" (David Atherton) – keyboards Dominic Lowe – accordion, trumpet "Bug" (Chris Atherton) – drums
Up the Shirkers (1993)	Andrew Kettle – vocals Bob Kettle – harmonica, mandolin, guitar John Kettle – guitar Janet Anderton – vocals Ed Jones – bass "Cudo" – percussion, keyboards, vocals Dominic Lowe – accordion, trumpet Chris Atherton – drums, programming, vocals
Flock (1994)	Andrew Kettle – vocals Bob Kettle – harmonica, mandolin, guitar John Kettle – guitar Janet Anderton – vocals Ed Jones – bass, vocals Lee Goulding – keyboards Guy Keegan – drums, percussion
Drag Down the Moon (1995)	Andrew Kettle – vocals Bob Kettle – harmonica, mandolin, guitar John Kettle – guitar Janet Anderton – vocals Robbie Ryan – bass, vocals Lee Goulding – keyboards Phillip Knight – drums
Reason to Be (1998)	John Kettle – guitar Janet Anderton – vocals Robbie Ryan – bass Tim Howard – guitar Andy Jones – drums

== Discography ==
=== Albums ===
- Shandyland (1991)
- Up the Shirkers (1993)
- Flock (1994)
- Drag Down the Moon (1995)
- Reason to Be (1998)

=== Singles ===
- "Brian Kant" (yeah-yeah-yooh)" (1992)
- "Up the Revolution" (1993)
- "The English Rover" (1993)
- "Camelot" (1993)
- "Iron Man/A Band on the Rainbow" (1994)
- "A Band on the Rainbow" (1994)
- "I Know I Can (But I Won't)" (1995)

=== Promo releases ===
- Transatlantic Records sampler (1994) (released in the UK as a limited edition of 5000)
- G-Man (1995) (released in France only)
- "Where Have All the Flowers Gone" (1995) (one-track demo CD)

=== Self-published tapes ===
Before the band recorded Shandyland, they recorded four cassette tapes which were sold at gigs. They include early workings of songs which would later be re-recorded for the albums and B-sides, some of which vary quite markedly from the final versions. Most of the songs were released on a new album, Rough and Ready (The Early Tapes) to coincide with the reunion concerts in 2010.

- The Den
- Wayward & Wonderful
- Big Wednesday
- Juvenile
