= List of Randy Cunningham: 9th Grade Ninja episodes =

This is a list of the animated Disney XD series, Randy Cunningham: 9th Grade Ninja episodes. A preview aired on August 13, 2012.

== Series overview ==
Season	Segments	Episodes	Originally released	
Season	Segments	Episodes	First released	Last released
1	52	26	August 13, 2012	February 8, 2014
2	48	24	July 19, 2014	July 27, 2015

== Episodes ==
=== Season 1 (2012–14) ===
The first season of the American animated television series Randy Cunningham: 9th Grade Ninja aired from August 13, 2012 to February 8, 2014 and consisted of 52 episodes.

No. overall	No. in season	Title	Directed by	Written by	Storyboard by	Original release date	US viewers (millions)
1	1a	"Last Stall on the Left"	Shaun Cashman	Jed Elinoff & Scott Thomas	Kim Arndt & Bob Suarez	August 13, 2012	0.60
Randy Cunningham, a 9th grade freshman, becomes the Ninja, an ancient warrior destined to protect Norisville High School from the forces of evil when tyrannical billionaire Hannibal McFist and his assistant Willem Viceroy III unleash a robot known as the Krakenstein to further the goals of the mysterious Sorcerer. But how long can he keep the secret from his best friend Howard Wienerman? Especially since Howard wants them to meet the ninja together. Ninjanomicon: Believe in the weapon that is in the suit
2	1b	"Got Stank?"	Shaun Cashman	Jed Elinoff & Scott Thomas	Alex Almaguer and Dan O'Connor	September 17, 2012	N/A
Randy and Howard try to get into a "cool zone" in the bleachers when watching their school play basketball. When Bucky is fired, The Sorcerer uses Bucky's negative emotions to turn him into a ferocious monster. Ninjanomicon: The evil funk possesses the vulnerable using that which he holds most dear
3	2a	"So U Think U Can Stank"	Josh Taback	Jed Elinoff & Scott Thomas	Peter Ferk and Larry Houston	September 18, 2012	N/A
Randy and Howard become judges for their school's talent show and Randy tells Howard that he should be "the mean judge." But the Sorcerer takes this chance and makes all the kids with failing acts monsters. Ninjanomicon: The Story of the Sorcerer
4	2b	"McFists of Fury"	Mike Milo	Hugh Webber and Jed Elinoff & Scott Thomas	Kim Arndt & Bob Suarez	September 19, 2012	N/A
When Randy discovers that Norrisville philanthropist Hannibal McFist is his enemy, he has a hard time trying to convince Howard that the one they believed to be their hero is actually an evil villain working with the Sorcerer. Ninjanomicon: Beware the enemy who wears a hero's mask
5	3a	"Gossip Boy"	Josh Taback	Hugh Webber	Peter Ferk and Larry Houston	September 20, 2012	N/A
Howard tells everyone on a web show that he knows who the Ninja is because he is under pressure and he is captured by McFist, who demands that he tell him who the Ninja is. Ninjanomicon: The way to forget is to remember
6	3b	"House of 1,000 Boogers"	Josh Taback	Hugh Webber; Story by : Hugh Webber and Jed Elinoff & Scott Thomas	Alex Almaguer and Dan O'Connor	September 24, 2012	N/A
The Ninja fights a lizard, which copies a sample of his snot. Later Randy and Howard attend a party Bash is throwing, but it's a scheme so McFist can find the Ninja by sampling everyone's snot and matching it with the Ninja's. Ninjanomicon: A Ninja must master the art of stealth: Reveal- Conceal; Conceal- Reveal
7	4a	"Monster Dump"	Mike Milo	Mitch Larson; Story by : Jed Elinoff & Scott Thomas	Dave Needham and Scott Bern	September 25, 2012	N/A
Randy's class takes a field trip to the town's volcano, but it's probably not going to be a nice stop-by. Ninjanomicon: A Ninja must never endanger the innocent, but he must always defend the defenseless
8	4b	"Attack of the Killer Potatoes"	Mike Milo	David Shayne; Story by : David Shayne and Jed Elinoff & Scott Thomas	Miles Thompson and Chuck Patton	September 26, 2012	N/A
Randy and Howard want to win the Science Fair, but they go too far, creating killer mutant potatoes in the process. Ninjanomicon: When faced with a mighty enemy, counter with a mightier force
9	5a	"The Tale of the Golden Doctor's Note"	Mike Milo	David Shayne	Kim Arndt & Bob Suarez	September 27, 2012	N/A
Howard and Randy take a trip with Julian under their school and go through the scary old gym in an effort to find a mythical golden doctor's note that can help them skip gym, but it is not as easy as they hoped it would be as the Sorcerer plans to take advantage of this. Ninjanomicon: The best way to avoid an attack is to avoid an attack
10	5b	"Dawn of the Driscoll"	Mike Milo	David Shayne	Scott Bern and Fred Cline	October 15, 2012	N/A
Randy accidentally brings the skeleton of a mad scientist named Jerry Driscoll (voiced by Andy Dick) to life, who wants to create a doomsday device that could wipe Norrisville off the map. Ninjanomicon: Hidden knowledge of the shadow warrior; The art of healing
11	6a	"Night of the Living McFizzles"	Joshua Taback	David Shayne	Alex Almaguer and Dan O'Connor	October 15, 2012	N/A
When walking Theresa Fowler and Debbie Kang home on Halloween night, Randy and Howard try to figure out what is turning everyone in the town into zombies.
12	6b	"Viva El Nomicon"	Mike Milo	Mitch Larson and Jed Elinoff & Scott Thomas; Story by : Jed Elinoff & Scott Thomas	Scott Bern and Fred Cline	October 16, 2012	N/A
A Mexican death bear threatens the school. Guest star: Judy Reyes as Señora Jorge Ninjanomicon: The only knowledge the ninja can possess is the knowledge that he possesses no knowledge
13	7a	"30 Seconds to Math"	Mike Milo	David Shayne and Jed Elinoff & Scott Thomas; Story by : Jed Elinoff & Scott Thomas	Kim Arndt & Bob Suarez	October 17, 2012	N/A
Randy must find a way to juggle his life as a Ninja and his friendship with Howard during the battle of the bands, while McFist tries to use a truth device that will reveal the Ninja's identity during the show. Ninjanomicon: Friendship is a weight the ninja can't carry
14	7b	"Monster Drill"	Josh Taback	David Shayne; Story by : Jed Elinoff & Scott Thomas	Alex Almaguer and Dan O'Connor	October 18, 2012	N/A
After a fight between Randy and Howard, a robo-mantis attacks during the school's annual "monster drill" routine where Howard is pretending to be the Ninja. Randy must find a way to get to his mask and to apologize to his friend. Ninjanomicon: Respect is a key that opens all doors
15	8a	"Silent Punch, Deadly Punch"	Chuckles Austen	Russ McGarry and Jed Elinoff & Scott Thomas; Story by : Jed Elinoff & Scott Thomas	Scott Bern and Fred Cline	December 3, 2012	TBA
Randy travels to the forest to retrieve a sap from a sacred tree in order to restock his smokebomb stash, but McFist beats him there and snags the tree for his holiday party. Randy poses a Ninja Santa to get in to the party and winds up defending himself against a robot snowman and his team of elves. Ninjanomicon: Smokebomb is a tool of strategy not a toy for a show and "Only from the sap of the Skunk Pine can a ninja craft a bombs of smoke
16	8b	"Stank'd to the Future"	Joshua Taback	Dean Batali and Jed Elinoff & Scott Thomas	Peter Ferk and Larry Houston	March 4, 2013	TBA
After a power outage at school, a Stankified Monster frozen in ice is freed. When Randy de-stanks him, he and Howard learn that his name is Dickie and his monster form was frozen in ice by the Ninja of 1985. When Dickie (voiced by Bobcat Goldthwait) is saddened by this and how he missed his chance with Tawny (voiced by Annie Potts), The Sorcerer takes the opportunity to re-stank him and find out what is the object of his stank. Ninjanomicon: The knot not tied unravels
17	9a	"Wave Slayers"	Joshua Taback	David Shayne; Story by : Jed Elinoff & Scott Thomas	Peter Ferk and Larry Houston	March 4, 2013	TBA
The Wave Slayer relays are occurring in Norrisville as Randy and Howard accidentally wrecks the Wave Slayer where an accident injures Buttermaker and causes Howard to take his place. The Sorcerer takes the opportunity to Stankify Buttermaker (voiced by Sterling Knight) into an aquatic monster that attacks the opposing team. Ninjanomicon: When a ninja does wrong, he must own up to his mistakes
18	9b	"Sword Quest"	Mike Milo	Darrick Bachman and Jed Elinoff & Scott Thomas; Story by : Jed Elinoff & Scott Thomas	Scott Bern, Fred Cline, and Mike Milo	March 11, 2013	TBA
Randy must learn a valuable new lesson about respect and humility when after accidentally breaking his sword. He enlists the help of the blind metal shop teacher S. Ward Smith (voiced by John Witherspoon) to get a custom-made sword. Meanwhile, S. Ward Smith's protege Brent believes he was replaced by Howard, and the Sorcerer decides to Stankify Brent (voiced by Jason Earles) into a monster that goes after Howard. Ninjanomicon: In the realm of the Ninja, a swordsmith crafts blades in a cauldron of fire
19	10a	"Nukid on the Block"	Joshua Taback	Dan Danko and Jed Elinoff & Scott Thomas; Story by : Jed Elinoff & Scott Thomas	Alex Almaguer and Dan O'Connor	March 11, 2013	TBA
Franz Nukid (voiced by Carlos Alazraqui), a strange new exchange student, threatens to destroy the Ninja as well as Randy and Howard's friendship which Hannibal McFist takes advantage of. Ninjanomicon: The most dangerous enemy often wears the mask of an ally
20	10b	"Weinerman Up"	Joshua Taback	Tom Martin; Story by : Jed Elinoff & Scott Thomas	Alex Almaguer and Dan O'Connor	March 18, 2013	TBA
When Randy and Howard's video game battle gets out of hand, the Ninja must save the town from a giant robot. Ninjanomicon: A Ninja must know when winning is losing and losing is winning
21	11a	"Evil Spirit Week"	Mike Milo	Mitch Larson and Jed Elinoff & Scott Thomas; Story by : Jed Elinoff & Scott Thomas	Kim Arndt & Bob Suarez	March 18, 2013	TBA
School Spirit Week turns into a disaster after Howard is possessed by a mythical demon bird called the Tengu which Randy releases. Ninjanomicon: —The battle between the tengu and the ninja. —The ninja and the tengu are forever linked, their strengths are shared
22	11b	"Der Monster Klub"	Joshua Taback	Ryan Raddatz and Jed Elinoff & Scott Thomas; Story by : Jed Elinoff & Scott Thomas	Alex Almaguer, Dan O'Connor, and Vaughn Tada	March 25, 2013	TBA
When Randy and Howard are forced to share a lunch table with the outcast group "Der Monster Klub", Randy accidentally tells them how to get people stank'd, and they realize these oddballs are playing a dangerous game that could destroy the whole school, even when the Sorcerer gets involved when some of the members get depressed.
23	12a	"Grave Puncher: The Movie!"	Joshua Taback	Hugh Webber	Peter Ferk and Larry Houston	March 25, 2013	TBA
During the premiere a new 6D film, the movie's title character comes to life and threatens to destroy Norrisville. Ninjanomicon: The Art of Escape: Deceit often comes at a price
24	12b	"Escape from Detention Island"	Mike Milo	Kevin Pederson and Jed Elinoff & Scott Thomas; Story by : Jed Elinoff & Scott Thomas	Scott Bern, Fred Cline, and Mike Milo	June 29, 2013	TBA
Randy helps students escape from Detention Island while fighting the Disciplinarian (voiced by Andy Richter). Ninjanomicon: Let the warrior who holds the weapon fight the battle
25	13a	"Bash Johnson: 11th Grade Ninja"	Joshua Taback	Ryan Raddatz and Jed Elinoff & Scott Thomas; Story by : Jed Elinoff & Scott Thomas	Peter Ferk and Larry Houston	June 29, 2013	TBA
After Bash unknowingly destakified Pradeep, he is mistaken for the Ninja. The Sorcerer even mistakes Bash for the Ninja and orders Hannibal McFist to have the Robo-Apes capture Bash. Ninjanomicon: Once the ninja is known, he can never be unknown
26	13b	"Shoob Tube"	Mike Milo	Tom Martin and Jed Elinoff & Scott Thomas	Scott Bern, Fred Cline, and Mike Milo	July 6, 2013	TBA
Randy and Howard seek revenge on a French exchange student named Jacques (voiced by Rob Paulsen) who stole their Internet video fame only for the Sorcerer to transform Jacques into a monkey-like monster and create a scene they weren't expecting.
27	14a	"Stanks Like Teen Spirit"	Mike Milo	Melissa Wong and Jed Elinoff & Scott Thomas; Story by : Jed Elinoff & Scott Thomas	Kim Arndt & Bob Suarez	July 6, 2013	TBA
When one of Willem Viceroy's robots disguised as Flackville's chess team member named Steve Riley (the real one was replaced by Hannibal McFist), it crushes Norrisville High's record....and their spirit as part of Hannibal McFist's plot. This causes the Sorcerer to invoke a mass stanking upon the entire school. Ninjanomicon: The use of other ninja balls. To underestimate your enemy is to invite your defeat. The apocalypse of the Sorcerer's escape
28	14b	"Raiders of the Lost Nomicon"	Joshua Taback	Tom Martin; Story by : Hugh Webber	Peter Ferk and Larry Houston	July 13, 2013	TBA
When Randy loses the NinjaNomicon, he must save it before hundreds of years of Ninja wisdom is revealed to his enemies. Ninjanomicon: The tiger who refuses to get his paws wet catches no fish
29	15a	"Rise of the Planet of the Robo-Apes"	Mike Milo	David Shayne	Kim Arndt & Bob Suarez	July 13, 2013	TBA
Randy and Howard are eager to ride a new roller coaster but first, the Ninja must stop a Robo-Ape uprising.
30	15b	"Secret Stache"	Joshua Taback	Tom Martin; Story by : Jed Elinoff & Scott Thomas	Alex Almaguer and Dan O'Connor	July 20, 2013	TBA
A feud breaks out when Howard is accepted into a school club and Randy isn't. But when Howard is in danger, the Ninja must put aside his grudge and come to the rescue. Ninjanomicon: The Art of Disguise: A master can alter his physical appearance by focusing on his ninja energy, but be warned, lose focus and the energy will master you
31	16a	"Hip Hopocalypse Now"	Mike Milo	Russ McGarry; Story by : Jed Elinoff & Scott Thomas	Scott Bern, Fred Cline, and Mike Milo	July 20, 2013	TBA
The Ninja accidentally summons a giant monster when he uses an ancient ninja lesson during a rap battle. Guest stars: David Alan Grier as Rudd Rhymez, and Biz Markie as Tiny Timmy Scratch-It Ninjanomicon: Stay grounded, do not waver. The earth itself will pay you a favor. To stop your foes and hold them back, harness the soil for an earth attack. —Words can be more powerful than the sword
32	16b	"Ninja Camp"	Mike Milo	Hugh Webber; Story by : Jed Elinoff & Scott Thomas	Kim Arndt & Bob Suarez	July 27, 2013	TBA
Randy must stop a former Norrisville Ninja-turned-nemesis (voiced by David Koechner) from recruiting an army intended to destroy the Ninja. Ninjanomicon: The questions of the present can be answered by the past
33	17a	"McFear Factor"	Joshua Taback	Russ McGarry; Story by : Jed Elinoff & Scott Thomas	Peter Ferk and Larry Houston	August 26, 2013	0.28
Randy must go with Howard to CluckFest under the threat of Bash Johnson. This won't be easy for Randy since he is afraid of chickens. Meanwhile, Hannibal McFist and Willem Viceroy III unleash a fear-pooping robotic rhinoceros called the Rhinosaurus that forces everyone to confront their worst fear as part of their plot to find the Ninja's greatest fear and take advantage of it. Ninjanomicon: To control your fear, you must embrace your fear
34	17b	"Randy Cunningham and the Sorcerer's Key"	Mike Milo	Hugh Webber; Story by : Jed Elinoff & Scott Thomas	Alex Almaguer, Dan O'Connor, and Mike Milo	October 5, 2013	0.42
Randy and Howard must sacrifice everything to prevent the Ninja's ultimate enemy from running amuck. Ninjanomicon: The Sorcerer's Key
35	18a	"The Ninja Identity"	Joshua Taback	David Shayne	Scott Bern and Fred Cline	October 12, 2013	0.30
When Randy inadvertently mind-wipes himself and develops amnesia, Debbie Kang discovers his identity, alerting McFist and the Sorcerer. Ninjanomicon: Previous Ninja Lessons
36	18b	"The Ninja Supremacy"	Joshua Taback	David Shayne	Scott Bern and Fred Cline	October 12, 2013	0.30
Howard must fill in as the Ninja until Randy can get his memory back. Ninjanomicon: Previous Ninja Lessons
37	19a	"Enter the Nomicon"	Mike Milo	Jed Elinoff & Scott Thomas	Kim Arndt & Bob Suarez	October 19, 2013	0.34
Mac Antfee (voiced by David Koechner) returns to Norrisville as a motivational speaker, only to have Randy reignite his burning desire to destroy the Ninja and take his place.
38	19b	"Swampy Seconds"	Mike Milo	Hugh Webber	Peter Ferk, Larry Houston, and Mike Milo	October 19, 2013	0.34
Randy misuses his Ninja powers, and the Nomicon refuses to let him Ninja out and rescue Howard from a psychotic Cajun trapper named Catfish Booray. Ninjanomicon: If you abuse the power, you lose the power
39	20a	"McSatchlé"	Chuckles Austen	Russ McGarry, Jim Martin, and Jed Elinoff & Scott Thomas; Story by : Jed Elinoff & Scott Thomas	Kim Arndt & Bob Suarez	October 26, 2013	0.44
When Randy and Howard do not have enough money to buy a McSatchle, they get jobs at McFist-O-Plex and Howard becomes Randy's manager. Guest star: Billy Idol as Punk-Bots Ninjanomicon: The gain is rarely worth the loss
40	20b	"Fart-Topia"	Joshua Taback	Ryan Harris and Jed Elinoff & Scott Thomas	Alex Almaguer and Dan O'Connor	October 26, 2013	0.44
When Randy helps Hannibal McFist's hippie brother Terry (voiced by Steve Zahn) take control of McFist Industries, Whoopee World is turned into a fart-powered nightmare. Ninjanomicon: The unknown ally can be more dangerous than the known enemy
41	21a	"The McHugger Games"	Mike Milo	Russ McGarry, David Shayne, Hugh Webber, Jim Martin, and Jed Elinoff & Scott Thomas; Story by : Jed Elinoff & Scott Thomas	Scott Bern, Fred Cline, and Mike Milo	November 2, 2013	0.44
In order to score a limousine ride with soccer super star Pitch Kickham (voiced by Simon Pegg), the Ninja swipes a pair of shorts to help him win a shoot-out competition. When McFist sends an I.D. Bot to find the shorts, Randy's identity is compromised and Howard must take Randy's place in the competition. Ninjanomicon: A ninja's hand is to give, not to take
42	21b	"McFreaks"	Chuckles Austen	Jim Martin	Peter Ferk and Larry Houston	November 2, 2013	0.44
The McFreak Show arrives in town and Randy is convinced that he wants a McFreak as a pet. But when the McFreaks go on a rampage, he realizes that wild animals don't really make the best pets. Ninjanomicon: What is wild, should not be caged
43	22a	"Sorcerer in Love"	Joshua Taback	David Shayne; Story by : Jed Elinoff & Scott Thomas	Kim Arndt & Bob Suarez	November 9, 2013	0.45
Randy, Howard, and all the boys at Norrisville High are entranced by the new girl in school named Amanda Levay. Little do they know that she's the Sorceress (voiced by Jennifer Tilly), the Sorcerer's long lost love in disguise where she has plans to free the Sorcerer. Ninjanomicon: The eyes can be deceived but the nose always knows
44	22b	"Pranks for Nothing"	Chuckles Austen	Jed Elinoff & Scott Thomas, Tom Martin, Hugh Webber, David Shayne, and Ryan Harris; Story by : Ryan Harris	Peter Ferk and Larry Houston	November 18, 2013	0.44
Bash Johnson pranks the whole school on his annual "Pranks Day". Randy and Howard have enough of it, so Randy decides to prank Bash back. However, Randy's prank backfires and Bash ends up bringing in a deadly weapon made by Willem Viceroy to get even. Ninjanomicon: He who crosses the line must prepare for the fall that follows
45	23a	"Lucius O'Thunderpunch"	Mike Milo	Jed Elinoff & Scott Thomas, Tom Martin, Hugh Webber, David Shayne, Jim Martin, and Ryan Harris	Alex Almaguer, Dan O'Connor, and Mike Milo	January 18, 2014	0.30
During "Ninja Day" McFist schemes to steal the spotlight by introducing a new hero - Himself. Ninjanomicon: When the ninja is no longer needed, the ninja shall lay down his sword
46	23b	"Bring Me the Head of Ranginald Bagel!"	Joshua Taback	Hugh Webber	Kim Arndt & Bob Suarez	January 18, 2014	0.30
When Randy lies that his name is Ranginald Bagel (voiced by Gilbert Gottfried), he puts the real Ranginald Bagel in danger of McFist's fury. Ninjanomicon: The ninja who looks the other way, fails to see the attack
47	24a	"Weinerman Tested, Cunningham Approved"	Chuckles Austen	David Shayne	Scott Bern and Fred Cline	January 25, 2014	0.34
Due to their ability to break McFist products, the boys become product testers at McFist Industries and inadvertently help Viceroy an indestructible ninja-seeking robot. Ninjanomicon: A problem at a distance may be a solution up close
48	24b	"Sorcerer in Love 2: Sorceress' Revenge"	Mike Milo	Russ McGarry	Kim Arndt & Bob Suarez	January 25, 2014	0.34
Randy and Howard follow Theresa Fowler (voiced by Sarah Hyland) and the rest of their classmates to a cool new club downtown only to discover that the Sorceress (voiced by Jennifer Tilly) has returned to seek revenge on the Ninja. Ninjanomicon: A hero sacrifices all to save the day
49	25a	"McOne Armed and Dangerous"	Shaun Cashman and Joshua Taback	Jim Martin and Hugh Webber	Kim Arndt & Bob Suarez	February 1, 2014	0.44
During the 50th Anniversary Celebration of McFist Industries, the Ninja outs McFist as a villain to the entire town. But with his cover blown, McFist is finally able to focus all of his power on destroying the Ninja. Ninjanomicon: Provoke your enemy and he will fight back
50	25b	"Shloomp! There It Is!"	Chuckles Austen	David Shayne and Jed Elinoff & Scott Thomas	Alex Almaguer and Scott Bern	February 1, 2014	0.44
Randy becomes so dependent on the Nomicon's wisdom that he goes to it for advice on everything. To teach him a lesson, the Nomicon traps him inside and puts an alternate consciousness in Randy's body, forcing Randy to try to find a way out of this mess. Ninjanomicon: A ninja without balance will fall
51	26	"Randy Cunningham: 13th Century Ninja"	Shaun Cashman	Jed Elinoff & Scott Thomas	Kim Arndt & Bob Suarez	February 8, 2014	0.38
52	26	"Randy Cunningham: 13th Century Ninja"	Shaun Cashman	Jed Elinoff & Scott Thomas	David Woo & Eugene Lee Kim Arndt and Bob Suarez	February 8, 2014	0.38
Randy and Howard accidentally stumble back in time and must help the original Ninja (voiced by Joel McHale) battle the Sorcerer. Adam Pally guest stars as Plop Plop. Ninjanomicon: You cannot right the future, until you write the past

=== Season 2 (2014–15) ===
The second season of American animated television series Randy Cunningham: 9th Grade Ninja aired from July 19, 2014 to July 27, 2015.

No. overall	No. in season	Title	Directed by	Written by	Storyboard by	Original release date	Prod. code	US viewers (millions)
53	1a	"On the Poolfront"	Stephanie Arnett	David Shayne	Kim Arndt & Bob Suarez	July 19, 2014	203	TBA
On the hottest day of the year, Mort Weinerman is finally able to build Randy and Howard's dream pool, thanks to his new promotion he received for building a robot that will destroy the Ninja for McFist. Ninjanomicon: Hope is the light that vanquishes all shadows
54	1b	"Flume-Igation"	Sean Petrilak	Russ McGarry and Arthur Pielli	Scott Bern and Jamie Vickers	July 19, 2014	203	TBA
When Randy and Howard don't want to admit they are too scared to ride Norrisville's new waterslide, the Ninja sabotages it and inadvertently release one of Viceroy's earliest creations. Ninjanomicon: The easy road often makes for a hard journey
55	2a	"Welcome Back Catfish"	Joshua Taback	Jed Elinoff & Scott Thomas	Kim Arndt & Bob Suarez	September 29, 2014	201	TBA
Catfish Booray returns to Norrisville as a substitute teacher under control of the Sorcerer. Ninjanomicon: The Sorcerer's Chaos Orbs
56	2b	"All the Juice That's Fish to Swim"	Stephanie Arnett	Jim Martin and Russ McGarry	Scott Bern and Jamie Vickers	September 29, 2014	201	TBA
Randy and Howard put investigative reporter Debbie Kang on the trail of the Ninja's secret identity. Ninjanomicon: Beware the wrong words from the right person
57	3a	"Julian's Birthday Surprise"	Sean Petrilak	Jim Martin	Paul Harmon and Max Lawson	September 30, 2014	202	TBA
Randy brings the Sorcerer's ball to Julian's magic-themed birthday party and accidentally unleashed its power. Ninjanomicon: The Sorcerer's origin
58	3b	"True Bromance"	Joshua Taback	Hugh Webber	Chris Copeland and Fabien Tong	September 30, 2014	202	TBA
Howard finds some other friends to hang with, causing a jealous Randy to plot a way to drive a wedge between Howard and his new bros. Ninjanomicon: The jealous dragon slays what it should protect
59	4a	"Unstank My Hart"	Joshua Taback	Hugh Webber and Jed Elinoff & Scott Thomas	Paul Harmon and Max Lawson	October 1, 2014	204	TBA
Randy and Howard are psyched to rock out with pop star Levandar Hart, but they are unaware that Levandar is secretly plotting his revenge for getting kicked out of their band. Ninjanomicon: The wrong not righted pays back ten-fold
60	4b	"Whoopee 2: The Wrath of Whoopee 2"	Stephanie Arnett	Jim Martin and Jed Elinoff & Scott Thomas	Chris Copeland and Fabien Tong	October 1, 2014	204	TBA
Randy and Howard rescue their favorite animatronic rock star from Whoopee World, only to discover he isn't who he seems to be. Ninjanomicon: Danger lies in protecting that which needs no protection
61	5a	"M-m-m-My Bologna"	Sean Petrilak	Russ McGarry	Kim Arndt & Bob Suarez	October 2, 2014	205	TBA
Randy and Howard must take care of a bologna baby for science class, and it mysteriously comes to live. Ninjanomicon: Only when the student is willing to learn will the teacher appear
62	5b	"Everybody Ninj-along"	Joshua Taback	Jim Martin and Hugh Webber	Scott Bern and Jamie Vickers	October 2, 2014	205	TBA
When Bucky creates a ninja theme song that the Ninja can't stand, Ninja's attempts to shut it down only makes it more popular. Ninjanomicon: The Ninja who avoids a battle ends up fighting a war
63	6a	"Fudge Factory"	Stephanie Arnett	Jim Martin and Russ McGarry	Paul Harmon and Max Lawson	October 3, 2014	206	TBA
Insulted that Howard doesn't think he's a good liar, Randy goes to extreme lengths to prove to his friend wrong and puts both of them in grave danger. Ninjanomicon: Deception is a blade that cuts both ways
64	6b	"Best Buds"	Sean Petrilak	Russ McGarry, David Shayne, and Hugh Webber	Chris Copeland and Fabien Tong	October 3, 2014	206	TBA
Worried about losing the "Best Bud" food-tasting competition, Randy uses the Nomicon to cheat and give himself super-senses. Ninjanomicon: Sometimes the only way to push forward is to pull back Note: This episode was dedicated to Elaine Stritch voice of Ruth.
65	7a	"Otto Know Better"	Joshua Taback	Jim Martin and Hugh Webber	Kim Arndt & Bob Suarez	October 10, 2014	207	TBA
When Randy finds and falls in love with Viceroy's beloved pet Otto, he refuses to give it back and puts Norrisville in danger. Ninjanomicon: A ninja's wants must not blind him to others' needs
66	7b	"Brolateral Damage"	Stephanie Arnett	David Shayne	Scott Bern and Jamie Vickers	October 10, 2014	207	TBA
Randy goes undercover to infiltrate Bash's inner circle so he can discover the secret behind McFist's next Ninja-destroying plan. Ninjanomicon: The mask worn too long becomes the face
67	8a	"Let the Wonk One In"	Joshua Taback	Jed Elinoff & Scott Thomas and Hugh Webber	Chris Copeland Fabien Tong, and Otis Brayboy	October 17, 2014	208	TBA
Randy unleashed the terrifying orange Halloweenja suit from the Nomicon and soon discover that it's a force he can't control. Ninjanomicon: Forbidden knowledge of the Shadow Warrior: Halloweenja suit, The Essence of Terror
68	8b	"The Curse of Mudfart"	Sean Petrilak	Jed Elinoff & Scott Thomas and Russ McGarry	James Lopez and Max Lawson	October 17, 2014	208	TBA
Randy can't resist tormenting Howard on Halloween by telling the scary story of the terrifying Mudfart and inadvertently brings the maniacal Mudfart back to life.
69	9a	"Shoot First, Ask Questions Laser"	Joshua Taback	David Shayne	James Lopez and Max Lawson	November 27, 2014	TBA	TBA
Wonk laser tag players Randy and Howard decide to use Ninja-ing to level the playing field. Ninjanomicon: A true ninja is always victorious
70	9b	"Ninjception"	Stephanie Arnett	Jim Martin and Russ McGarry	Chris Copeland, Stephanie Arnett, and Bernie Petterson	November 27, 2014	TBA	TBA
Stuck in a dream-within-a-dream-within-a-dream, Randy must figure out how to escape the loop.
71	10a	"Happy Hanukkah, Howard Weinerman!"	Sean Petrilak	David Shayne and Jed Elinoff & Scott Thomas; Story by : Eve Weston	Jim Shellhorn and Bernie Petterson	December 3, 2014	TBA	TBA
Howard finds out about the true meaning of Hanukkah by saving Greg's Game Hole. Ninjanomicon: Ninja Hydro-hand
72	10b	"Snow-Klahoma!"	Stephanie Arnett	Jim Martin and David Shayne	James Lopez and Max Lawson	December 3, 2014	TBA	TBA
Randy and Howard go to Snow-klahoma. However, Randy leaves the Nomicon at school on purpose to prevent his ninja duties from distracting them. Ninjanomicon: A ninja's choices must be chosen by his own choosing
73	11a	"Randy Cunningham's Day Off"	Stephanie Arnett	John O'Bryan and Jim Martin	Kim Arndt & Bob Suarez	March 16, 2015	209	0.37
Randy's fake sick day creates more trouble than he bargained for after Howard attempts to get his best friend back to school to avoid eating lunch by himself. Ninjanomicon: The ninja can take a sick day
74	11b	"Bro-ing Down the House"	Sean Petrilak	Russ McGarry	Scott Bern and Jamie Vickers	March 16, 2015	209	0.37
Even though he knows he shouldn't, Randy breaks into McFist's empty house to retrieve a lost boomerang, putting himself and Howard in grave danger. Ninjanomicon: Don't go in someone else's house
75	12a	"Living in Shooblivion"	Sean Petrilak	Jim Martin	Kim Arndt & Bob Suarez	March 23, 2015	211	0.48
Randy becomes blinded by his own doodles and seeks the help of S. Ward Smith, the blind sword smith of Norrisville.
76	12b	"McNinja - Brought to You by McFist"	Joshua Taback	Russ McGarry and Jed Elinoff & Scott Thomas	Scott Bern and Jamie Vickers	March 23, 2015	211	0.48
Randy learns the dangers of selling out when he endorses every business in Norrisville, including McFist Industries. Ninjanomicon: The Ninja belongs to everyone
77	13a	"Mastermind of Disastermind"	Joshua Taback	Jed Elinoff & Scott Thomas, Jim Martin, and Russ McGarry	Kim Arndt & Bob Suarez	March 30, 2015	213	0.48
Randy has to prove to Howard that he is a better mastermind than him, but unfortunately, Evil Julian has the power ball to destroy the ninja. Ninjanomicon: The unexpected is never expected
78	13b	"The Brawn Also Rises"	Stephanie Arnett	David Shayne	Scott Bern and Jamie Vickers	March 30, 2015	213	0.48
Randy and Howard claim to have encountered a "chuckacabra," this brings the attention of famous TV explorer Brawn Brickwall to come to Norrisville. Ninjanomicon: Glory unearned is inglorious
79	14a	"Debbie Meddle"	Sean Petrilak	Hugh Webber	James Lopez and Max Lawson	April 6, 2015	214	0.42
Debbie Kang figures out Randy Cunningham is the Ninja. She goes to reveal her discovery on Heidi's Me-Cast.
80	14b	"Aplopalypse Now"	Joshua Taback	Arthur Pielli	Russ Edmonds and Jim Shellhorn	April 6, 2015	214	0.42
The guardian Plop Plop is removed from his post by Randy and Howard, causing trouble for all of them. Ninjanomicon: The Ninja's quest to replenish Plop-Plop's food supplies who also guards one of the Sorcerer's Chaos orbs in the Sacred Temple
81	15a	"Rorg: Hero of a Past"	Stephanie Arnett	Jed Elinoff & Scott Thomas and Russ McGarry	Kim Arndt & Bob Suarez and Ruolin Li	April 13, 2015	215	0.40
Viceroy begins ripping off designs from the cartoon Rorg: A Hero of a Past for his destroy-the-ninja robots. Ninjanomicon: To defeat your enemy, you must know which enemy you are fighting
82	15b	"Mort-al Combat"	Sean Petrilak	Hugh Webber	Scott Bern and Ed Baker	April 13, 2015	215	0.40
Mort Weinerman becomes paranoid of the Ninja being out to get him and his family. Hoping to protect his family he attacks first. Ninjanomicon: He who deserves the blame must blame himself/He who deserves the blame can only blame himself
83	16a	"Wonkin' for the Weekend"	Joshua Taback	John O'Bryan Jed Elinoff & Scott Thomas	James Lopez and Max Lawson	April 20, 2015	216	0.34
During Norrisville High's Saturday school, Howard becomes a genius. Ninjanomicon: When you use a friend you gain an enemy
84	16b	"Ninjafan"	Stephanie Arnett	Hugh Webber John O'Bryan, and Arthur Pielli	Russ Edmonds & Haylee Herrick	April 20, 2015	216	0.34
Ninja fan, Rachel writes a song for the Ninja. Seeing this, Ninja decides to spend the day with her. Ninjanomicon: He who relies on others for everything can rely on himself for nothing
85	17a	"When Howie Met Randy"	Sean Petrilak	Jim Martin and David Shayne	Ruolin Li and Jim Shellhorn	April 27, 2015	217	0.32
New kid Howard Weinerman doesn't believe in the Norrisville Ninja. Six-year-old Randy is determined to prove to Howard the Ninja is real by getting them to sneak into Norrisville High.
86	17b	"Bro Money Bro Problems"	Joshua Taback	Matt Fleckenstein	Scott Bern and Jamie Vickers	April 27, 2015	217	0.32
After Randy and Howard sell Ninja-weapons to Gene Levine, Viceroy decides to buy them for his latest ninja-destroying-plan. Ninjanomicon: In battle, a warrior's weapons can be used against him
87	18a	"The Three Mascoteers"	Stephanie Arnett	Jim Martin and John O'Bryan	James Lopez and Max Lawson	May 11, 2015	TBA	0.41
Doug gets replaced by Howard as the Norrisville High mascot. Ninjanomicon: Harmony cannot be made with a single note
88	18b	"Escape from Scrap City"	Sean Petrilak	Jim Martin	Russ Edmonds & Haylee Herrick	May 11, 2015	TBA	0.41
Both getting trapped in Scrap City, Hannibal and the Ninja must work together to escape. Ninjanomicon: Victory lies in facing the greatest danger first
89	19a	"Space Cow-Bros"	Josh Taback	Jim Martin and Hugh Webber	Ruolin Li and Jim Shellhorn	May 18, 2015	TBA	0.33
Howard is accidentally launched into space by Randy. Ninjanomicon: Sometimes protecting someone is the most dangerous thing a Ninja can do
90	19b	"The Fresh Principal of Norrisville High"	Stephanie Arnett	John O'Bryan	Hillary Bradfield and Jamie Vickers	May 18, 2015	TBA	0.33
Slimovitz gets fired as principal and an experimental computer program is put into the job.
91	20a	"The Prophecy of Hat Sword"	Sean Petrilak	Nick Confalone and David Shayne	Max Lawson and James Lopez	June 1, 2015	TBA	0.26
Randy and Howard come up with a prophecy that mentions they can't be separated or else, to scare Slimovitz turn into not separating them after saying he would if the two didn't improve their grades. Ninjanomicon: The answer is in the book
92	20b	"Fake Fight for Your Right to Party"	Josh Taback	Nick Confalone, Jim Martin, and Jed Elinoff & Scott Thomas	Russ Edmonds & Haylee Herrick	June 1, 2015	TBA	0.26
Attempting to get party-practice, Randy and Howard get kicked out of a party and try to find a way back in. Ninjanomicon: The Ninja who holds himself highest has the furthest to fall
93	21a	"McCluckerbusters"	Stephanie Arnett	John O'Bryan and Hugh Webber	Ruolin Li Jim Shellhorn, and David Woo	June 8, 2015	TBA	0.29
The feud between, PJ McFlubbuster and Charlie Clucker's develops into a war. Ninjanomicon: The Ninja that takes more than he needs gets more than he wants
94	21b	"Let Them Eat Cake Fries"	Sean Petrilak and Russell Calabrese	Jed Elinoff & Scott Thomas	Hillary Bradfield, Claudia Keene Jamie Vickers, and Sean Petrilak	June 8, 2015	TBA	0.29
Cake Fries are taken off the Norrisville High Cafeteria menu leading the students to oppose after a legendary defender of school justice rises from the history books. Ninjanomicon: He who attacks without cause has no cause to attack
95	22a	"Club Ninja-dise"	Joshua Taback	John O'Bryan and Hugh Webber	Stephanie Gonzaga, Max Lawson, and James Lopez	June 15, 2015	TBA	0.30
Randy uses the Ninja to ruin McFist's vacation causing McFist to attack back, ruining Randy and others' spring break. Ninjanomicon: An enemy at peace should be left at peace
96	22b	"To Smell and Back"	Felipe Salazar	Jim Martin and Arthur Pielli	Phil Allora Russ Edmonds & Haylee Herrick	June 15, 2015	TBA	0.30
Howard blames his fart on the Ninja. NHS students continue to laugh at the Ninja, leaving Randy unnerved. Ninjanomicon: A ninja does not take light matters seriously
97	23a	"Big Trouble in Little Norrisville"	Sean Petrilak and Russell Calabrese	Nick Confalone, Arthur Pielli, and David Shayne	Ed Baker Ruolin Li, and Jim Shellhorn	June 22, 2015	TBA	0.34
While on a field trip to Little Norrisville, Howard discovers a mysterious ancient wishing idol. An ominous figure is in search of it as well and will stop at nothing to get it. Ninjanomicon/The Shopkeeper: One who Receives all that thy desires, ends up in with none thing
98	23b	"Winner Takes Ball"	Joshua Taback	Nick Confalone	Hillary Bradfield Sean Petrilak, and Jamie Vickers	June 22, 2015	TBA	0.34
Norisvillians mysteriously begin looking for the power balls. Howard unintentionally goes searching and finds one, leading the crazed townsfolk to come after him. Ninjanomicon: You must protect the balls at any cost
99	24a	"Ball's Well That Friends Well"	Stephanie Arnett & Russell Calabrese	Jed Elinoff & Scott Thomas	Ed Baker, Stephanie Gonzaga, and James Lopez	July 27, 2015	224A	0.31
100	24b	"Ball's Well That Friends Well"	Shaun Cashman	Jed Elinoff & Scott Thomas	Hillary Bradfield, Russ Edmonds, Traci Honda, Jim Shellhorn & Joshua Taback	July 27, 2015	224B	0.31
Part 1: Randy discovers his family is moving, so he goes to defeat Evil Julian once and for all before they leave. Part 2: After falling into the Land of Shadows, Randy and Howard must find their way back to Norrisville to stop Evil Julian. Ninjanomicon: When facing an unbeatable enemy seek an unlikely ally
