= The Middlewich Paddies =

Irish folk band formed in 1979 in Cheshire

- Origin: England
- Genres: Folk
- Years active: 1980–present
- Members: Richard Devaney; Dave Thompson; Graham Sivills
- Past members: Michael Woodbine
- Website: http://www.middlewichpaddies.nordendesign.co.uk/

The Middlewich Paddies are an Irish folk band formed in 1979 in the town of Middlewich in Cheshire. Although not widely known outside of folk music circles, two members of the band were instrumental in setting up the Middlewich folk and boat festival.

== Members ==
- Richard Devaney – vocalist
- Dave Thompson – guitar, harmonica and vocals
- Graham Sivills – mandolin, guitar, whistle and vocals

== Discography ==
=== Albums ===
- The Best of the Middlewich Paddies, 1990
- Mann Alive, 1992 Recorded in the Isle of Man
