= Middleditch and Schwartz =

American improv comedy TV series

- Genre: Comedy
- Created by: Thomas Middleditch; Ben Schwartz
- Directed by: Ryan Polito
- Starring: Thomas Middleditch; Ben Schwartz
- Country of origin: United States
- No. of seasons: 1
- No. of episodes: 3

Production
- Executive producers: John Irwin; Thomas Middleditch; Ben Schwartz; Casey Spira
- Cinematography: Jay Lafayette

Original release
- Release: April 21, 2020

Middleditch and Schwartz is an American improvisational comedy television series created by and starring Thomas Middleditch and Ben Schwartz. The series of three hour-long performances was filmed at New York University's Skirball Center for the Performing Arts, and premiered on Netflix on April 21, 2020.

== Premise ==
Each hour-long episode is based on a random audience suggestion and is entirely improvised by performers Thomas Middleditch and Ben Schwartz.

== Episodes ==
No.	Title	Directed by	Original release date
1	"Parking Lot Wedding"	Ryan Polito	April 21, 2020
2	"Law School Magic"	Ryan Polito	April 21, 2020
3	"Dream Job"	Ryan Polito	April 21, 2020

== Reception ==
The series was met with critical acclaim, receiving an approval rating of 100% on Rotten Tomatoes based on 13 reviews, with an average rating of 8.8/10. The website's critic consensus calls it a "brilliant series of specials sure to spark all kinds of joy" and "a masterclass in improv comedy." On Metacritic, the show has a score of 86 out of 100 based on four reviews, indicating "universal acclaim".

Jesse David Fox, writing for Vulture, commented that the series "could have significant ramifications on improv’s position in our culture" by opening the door for other comedians to practice improv professionally rather than in an amateur capacity.
