= Tanglefoot (band) =

Canadian folk band

- Origin: Owen Sound, Ontario, Canada
- Genres: Folk
- Years active: 1979–2009, 2026–present
- Label: Borealis Records
- Members: Steve Ritchie; Al Parrish; Rob Ritchie; Sandra Swannell Young; Josh Ritchie
- Past members: Terry Young (d. 2022); Joe Grant; Bob Wagar; Tim Rowat; Frank Skrzeszewski; Terry Snider; Bryan Weirmier; Robert Graham; Erin Donovan
- Website: www.tanglefootmusic.ca

Tanglefoot is a Canadian folk band from Owen Sound, Ontario. Formed in Peterborough in the early 1980s by Joe Grant, Bob Wagar, and Tim Rowat to play traditional music, they became a five-piece band playing largely original music.

== Overview ==
Tanglefoot is best known for original songs that blend history, storytelling, and strong vocal harmony. Formed in 1980, the group emerged from Ontario's folk scene and went on to tour extensively throughout Canada, the United States, and the United Kingdom.

Tanglefoot developed a reputation for high-energy live performances and an ability to animate historical events through engaging, accessible songs.

Drawing on traditional folk instrumentation while maintaining a contemporary songwriting voice, the band's music explores themes of place, memory, and shared experience. Their catalogue includes numerous albums that remain well regarded within the Canadian folk community, and their live shows became known for their warmth, musicianship, and connection with audiences.

After concluding regular touring in 2009, the band members pursued individual projects while their music continued to reach new listeners.

In 2026, Tanglefoot reunited with the addition of Rob Ritchie’s son Josh.

== Discography ==
- Dance Like Flames – Released by Borealis Records in 2006; BCD-179CD
- Way More Live – Released on DVD by Borealis Records in 2004; BDVD001
- Captured Alive – Released by Borealis Records in 2003; BCD-157CD
- Agnes on the Cowcatcher – Released by Borealis Records in 2002; BCD-143CD
- Full Throated Abandon – Released by Borealis Records in 1999; BCD-115CD
- The Music in the Wood – Released by Tanglefoot Media in 1996; TML14-0896CD
- Voyageurs et Vagabonds: Songs of the Voyageurs – Released by Ooze River Music 1995; ORM8-989
- Saturday Night in Hardwood Lake – Released by Tanglefoot Media in 1994; TML12-1194CD
- Grain of Salt – Released by Ooze River Music 1992; ORM11-1192CD
- Voyageurs & Vagabonds (cassette) – Released by Ooze River Music 1987; ORM5-287
- Songs of the River (cassette) – Released by Ooze River Music 1984; ORM-002
- Igg's Pig: Songs and Stories for Young Canadians – Released by Waterloo Music 1984; WR-8030

== Awards and achievements ==
Extensive national and international touring history spanning 1996-2009

Canadian Folk Music Awards:

- 2007 Best Vocal Group (Dance Like Flames)

Crossroads Magazine Music Awards:

- 1999 Gold Star Award for Best Album (Full Throated Abandon)

Bound for Glory Award:

- 2000-2001 Best of Bound for Glory Award (Live Performance)

Pathway of Fame:

- 2012 Founding members of Tanglefoot (Joe Grant, Tim Rowat and Bob Wagar) inducted into the Pathway of Fame in Peterborough, Ontario
