= Tom Doughty =

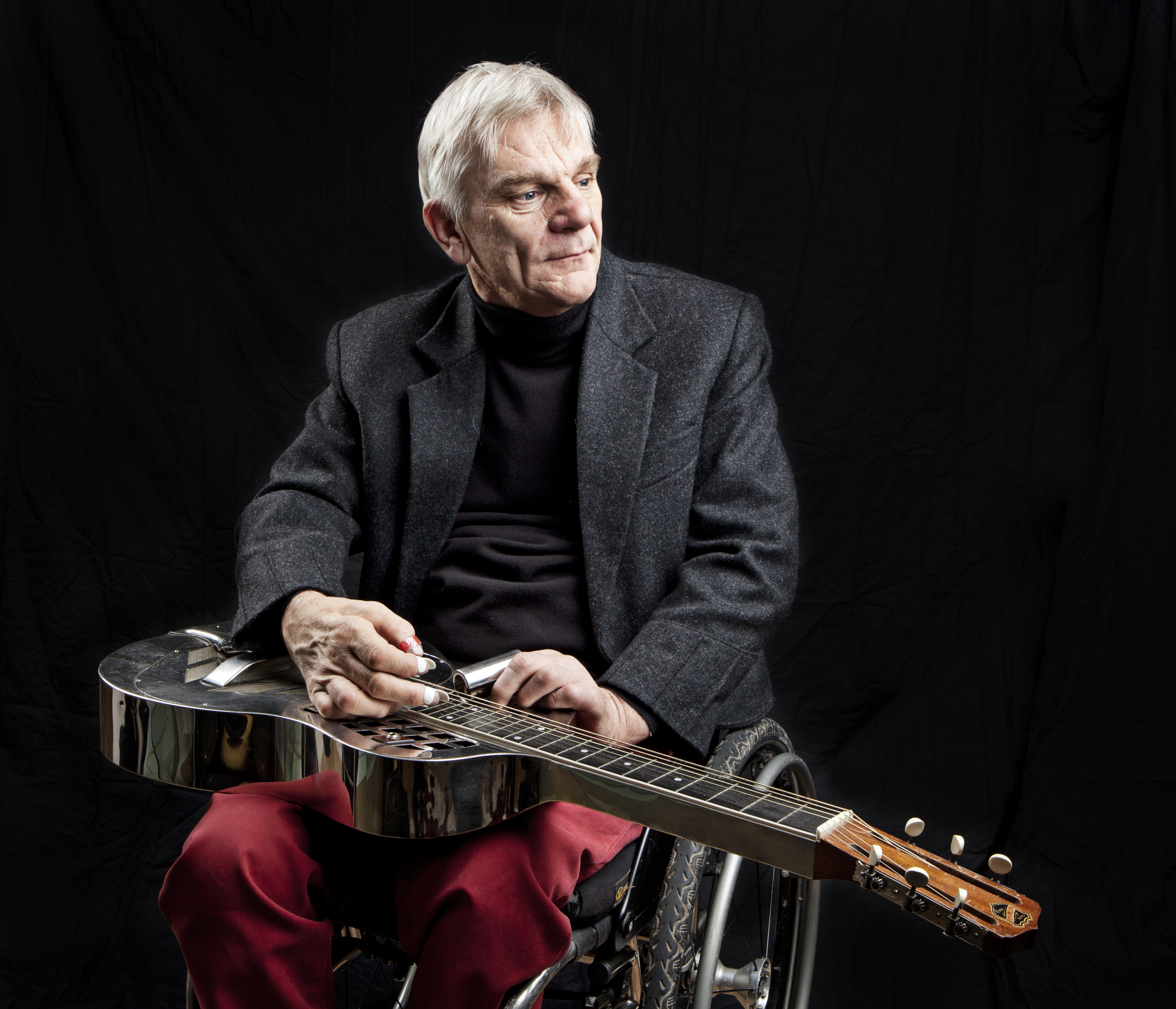

Background information
- Born: Thomas Doughty
- Origin: Cheshire, England
- Occupation: Singer-songwriter
- Instruments: Vocals, guitar
- Website: http://www.tomdoughty.com

Thomas Doughty is an English, Cheshire-based lap steel acoustic guitarist, composer, lap guitar teacher and singer-songwriter, who has released four albums. His style is free-flowing and improvisational, drawing from the blues, folk, world music and jazz-swing standards. He has played at venues all over the United Kingdom, Europe, The Middle East, Canada and the United States. In December 2003, he was the featured artist on Paul Jones' blues show on BBC Radio 2; in 2018 live on Cerys Matthews BBC Blues Programme and has been featured on that show several times since, as well as other international radio and TV programmes.

Due to his disability, (a Spinal Injury caused by a road accident in 1974), Tom has developed a new approach and method of playing his instrument. Despite his impairment, Tom is recognised as one of the world's finest lap steel guitar players.

In 2012, he became a member of the British Paraorchestra, which was created by the conductor Charles Hazlewood.

In 2014 and again in 2018, Tom Doughty embarked on a teaching and instructional tour of the UK spinal injuries centres. The purpose of this was to facilitate inclusion of guitar playing as part of the rehabilitation progress. Realising that he was probably the only practising professional lap steel guitar player with a high, cervical, spinal injury, Tom had formed the belief that finding new ways to develop dexterity and balance great assets to people with such injuries and that the benefits to participation and integration of playing an instrument were enormous. Help with funding that all came from the UK arts Council, the music industry, the British Paraorchestra, Yamaha and Takamine, who provided guitars and the charity Creative United. Both workshops provided guitars, that were left with each hospital, slides and adaptions to enable people with limited and function to play, various other equipment invented by Tom to enable manipulation of strings. The conclusion has been that various patients and staff, particularly those who have played the guitar previously have benefited enormously from Tom's input and several people have taken up the slide guitar since being discharged from hospitals.

== Discography ==
- The Bell (2002)
- Running Free (2005)
- Have A Taste Of This (2008)
- Journeyman Blues – Single (2012) – Journeyman Blues & Your Picture Has Faded (feat. Nick Boyes & Mike Sturgis)
- Can't Teach An Old Dog (2017)
