= The Family Mahone =

Folk rock band from Chester, England

- Origin: Chester, England
- Genres: Folk rock
- Members: Rusty Mahone; Mark Radcliffe

The Family Mahone is an English folk rock band from Chester, England. The radio DJ Mark Radcliffe is a member.

== Discography ==
- Songs of the Back Bar (1999)
- On the Razzle with the Family Mahone (2002)
- Mahone Brew (April 2006)
