= Battle of Middlewich =

There were two Battles of Middlewich during the First English Civil War

- First Battle of Middlewich, 13 March 1643
- Second Battle of Middlewich, 26 December 1643
