= Merry Hell =

English folk rock band

- Merry Hell playing live in 2019

Background information
- Origin: Wigan, England
- Genre: Folk rock
- Years active: 2010–present
- Label: Mrs Casey Records
- Members: Andrew Kettle; Bob Kettle; John Kettle; Virginia Kettle; Colin Foster; Lee Goulding; Andy Jones; Simon Swarbrick
- Past members: Andrew Dawson; Phill Knight; Tim Howard; Nick Davies; Neil McCartney
- Website: http://www.merryhell.co.uk

Merry Hell are an English folk rock band from Wigan, Greater Manchester, formed in 2010. The core members of the band include the three Kettle brothers, who were previously members of the Tansads. As of 2026 Merry Hell have released seven albums.

== History ==
Guitarist and songwriter John Kettle and his brothers, mandolin player Bob and vocalist Andrew, were members of the 1990s folk rock band the Tansads. In 2010, over a decade since they last performed together, former members of the band reunited for a series of concerts in St Helens. Following the successful gigs, some of the musicians involved, including the three brothers, decided to continue as a band, but rather than use the Tansads name chose to adopt the new name Merry Hell. In addition to the former Tansads, other members of the new band included John Kettle's wife Virginia. Merry Hell were signed to the Mrs Casey Records label on the basis of a demo recording, and in October 2011 released their debut album Blink... and You Miss It.

In 2012, Merry Hell performed at Folk on the Pier in Cromer, the Derbyshire 'Big Session', the Towersey Village Festival, Wickham Festival, and the Great British Folk Festival at Skegness. They also performed an autumn show at St Helens Citadel, billed as "Merry Helloween".

The band's second album, Head Full of Magic, Shoes Full of Rain, was released in 2013, and features a guest performance by Dave Swarbrick, formerly of Fairport Convention. That year the band performed more than forty live shows, and also played at the Acoustic Festival of Britain at Uttoxeter, Off The Tracks in Derbyshire, the Beverley Folk Festival, the Stainsby Festival, the Wickham Festival and Beautiful Days in Devon.

In 2014 the band released the EP The Ghost, which previewed tracks from their upcoming third album, and took part in the Armistice Pals project, collaborating with other folk artists including Lucy Ward, Christine Collister and Robb Johnson on a version of Pete Seeger's song "Where Have All the Flowers Gone" to mark the centenary of the outbreak of the First World War. Merry Hell's third album, The Ghost in Our House... And Other Stories... was released in early 2015 and features a guest appearance by guitarist Gordon Giltrap. The band's fourth album Bloodlines followed in late 2016, and the fifth Anthems to the Wind in 2018. In November 2020 the band released their sixth album Emergency Lullabies.

== Members ==
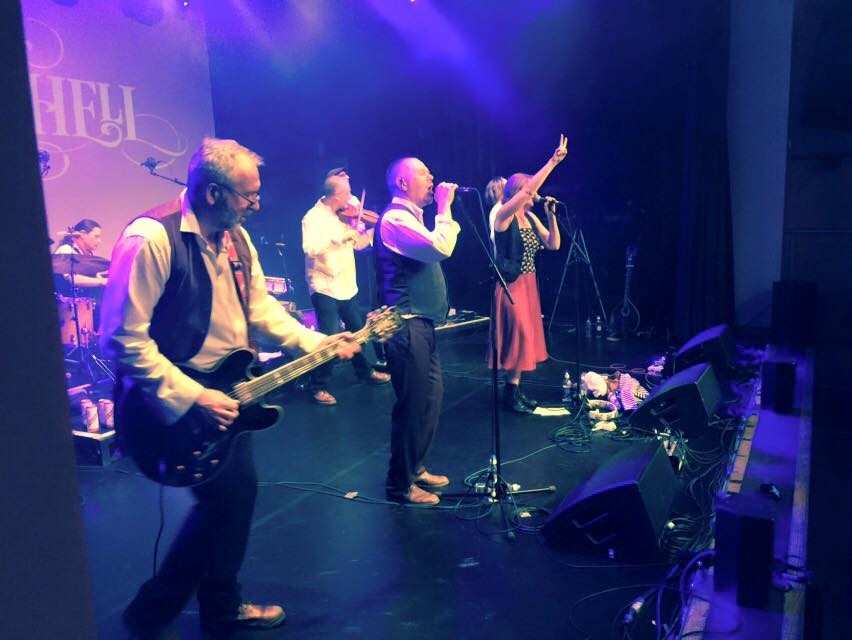
The band playing live in 2015

=== Current ===
- Andrew Kettle – vocals
- Bob Kettle – mandolin
- John Kettle – guitar
- Virginia Kettle – vocals, guitar
- Lee Goulding – keyboards
- Colin Foster – bass
- Andy Jones – drums
- Simon Swarbrick – fiddle

=== Former ===
- Andrew Dawson – bass
- Nick Davies - bass
- Tim Howard – guitar
- Phill Knight – drums
- Neil McCartney - fiddle

== Discography ==
=== Studio albums ===
- Blink... And You Miss It (2011)
- Head Full of Magic, Shoes Full of Rain (2013)
- The Ghost in Our House and Other Stories... (2015)
- Bloodlines (2016)
- Anthems to the Wind (2018)
- Emergency Lullabies (2020)
- Rising of the Bold (2025)

=== Compilation albums ===
- Let the Music Speak for Itself (2023)

=== DVDs ===
- A Grand Night Out - Merry Hell Live
- A Documentary: A Year in the Life of Merry Hell (2019)
