= Thomas Middleditch =

Canadian actor (born 1982)

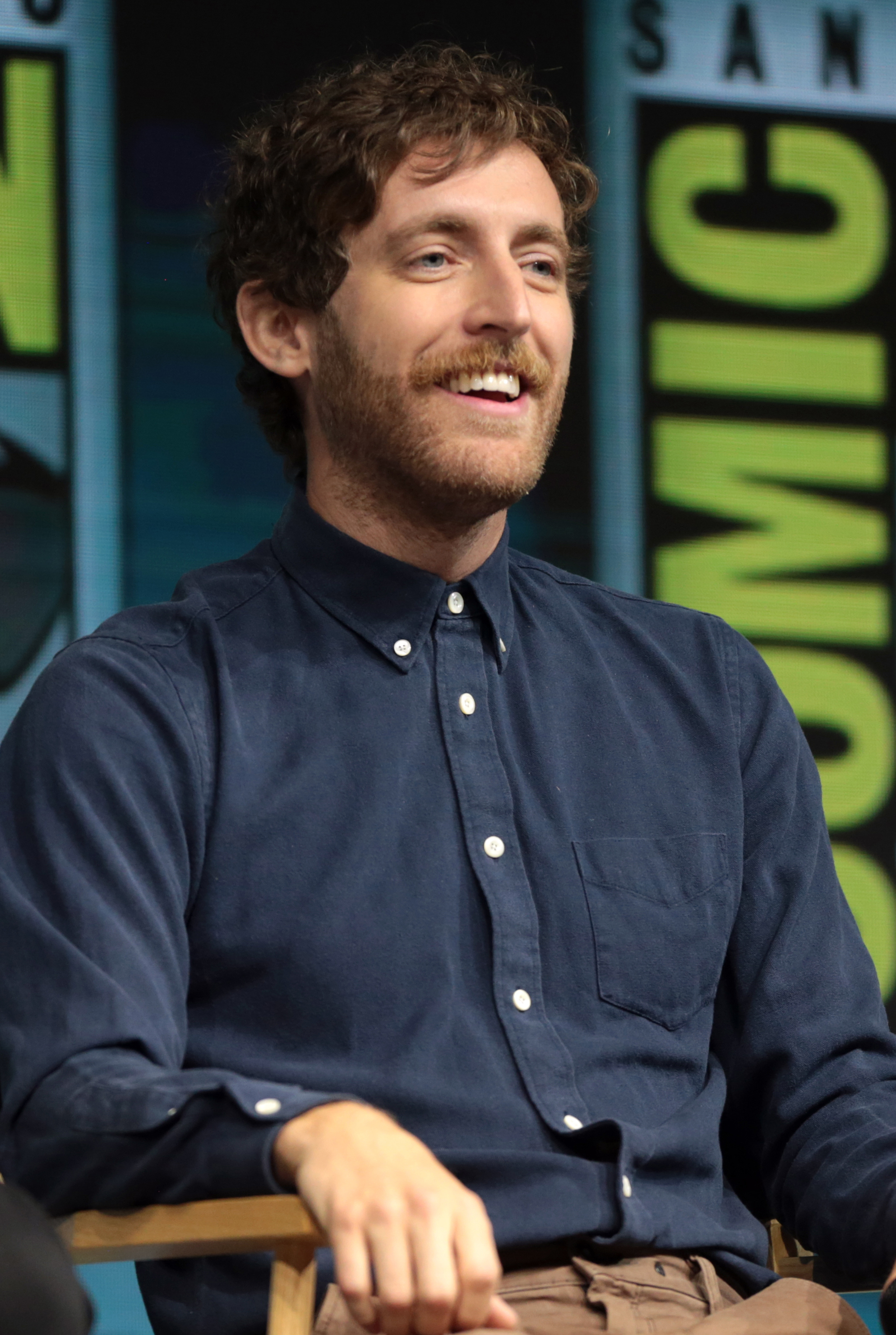
- Middleditch in 2018
- Born: Thomas Steven Middleditch; March 10, 1982 (age 44); Nelson, British Columbia, Canada
- Citizenship: Canada; United States
- Occupation: Actor
- Years active: 2007–present
- Spouse: Mollie Gates (m. 2015; div. 2021)

Thomas Steven Middleditch (born March 10, 1982) is a Canadian actor. He is best known for his role as Richard Hendricks in the HBO series Silicon Valley (2014–2019), earning a nomination for the Primetime Emmy Award for Outstanding Lead Actor in a Comedy Series. He voiced the titular character in the Disney XD animated series Penn Zero: Part-Time Hero (2014–2017), Harold Hutchins in Captain Underpants: The First Epic Movie (2017), Sam Coleman in Godzilla: King of the Monsters (2019), and Terry Opposites in the Hulu adult animated sci-fi series Solar Opposites. Middleditch made his Broadway debut in 2024 as Eli in Eureka Day. He also appeared in ads for Verizon Wireless.

== Early life ==
Middleditch was born on March 10, 1982, in Nelson, British Columbia, Canada. His parents are British. He was cast in a play in grade eight which he said "changed everything" for him. He discovered improv in grade school from performing with Theatresports. His first job was acting in Canadian Heritage Plays for his hometown.

He studied theatre at the University of Victoria before moving to Toronto, where he auditioned for and enrolled in George Brown Theatre School, but never began his course. He instead opted to make sketches on his own and worked at a New Balance store for an income. He relocated to Chicago, where he took classes at The Second City and iO Theater, while also performing regularly. He was a founding member in 2005 of the Improvised Shakespeare Company. Due to immigration issues, he worked various cash jobs until Charna Halpern sponsored him to get his work visa. While performing on a Second City cruise, he got an audition for Saturday Night Live. Though he did not get cast, the routine he used in his audition landed him a network holding deal and he moved to New York City.

== Career ==
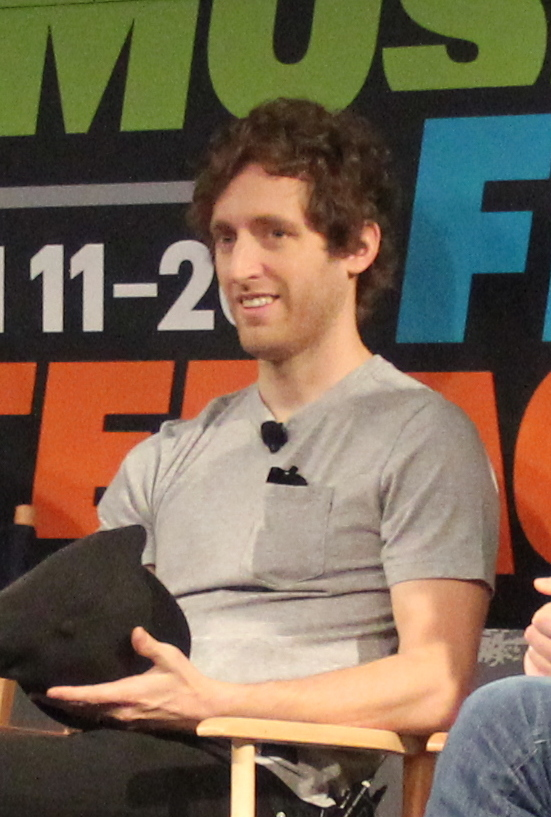
Middleditch at SXSW 2016

While living in New York City, Middleditch began acting in commercials. In 2007 a sketch video for Chicken McNuggets he made with Fernando Sosa in Chicago was purchased by McDonald's and used as a commercial. He appeared in the 2009 romantic comedy Splinterheads, portraying the lead role of Justin Frost. On March 25, 2010, he joined a CBS pilot, Hitched, written by Josh Schwartz and directed by Rob Greenberg. On May 5, 2011, Middleditch made his first appearance in Jake and Amir, in the episode "Jake and Amir: Doobs".

On May 31, 2011, Middleditch joined the cast of Fun Size, directed by Josh Schwartz. On August 8, 2011, he joined Road to Nardo, a film that would have been Scot Armstrong's directorial debut. On December 12, 2011, he joined Jay Roach's The Campaign, starring Will Ferrell and Zach Galifianakis.

On July 23, 2012, Middleditch joined the cast of Someone Marry Barry, directed and written by Rob Pearlstein and produced by Barry Josephson. On August 23, 2012, he appeared in The Office's final season episode "The Farm". He had a role in The Brass Teapot (2013) and played a police officer in The Kings of Summer (2013).

On January 30, 2013, Middleditch joined HBO's comedy pilot Silicon Valley, playing Richard Hendricks. He has said the pilot was written with him in mind as the lead.

For his work on the show, Middleditch received four Satellite Awards nominations (winning in 2019) and two Critics' Choice Television Award nominations. In 2016, Middleditch earned his first Primetime Emmy Award nomination for Outstanding Lead Actor in a Comedy Series.

On April 23, 2013, he was added to the cast of Search Party, playing Nardo. Middleditch made a cameo in The Wolf of Wall Street as a broker fired for cleaning his fish bowl.

He played a hipster thief in You're The Worst. On The Pete Holmes Show, he portrayed several characters from X-Men and Street Fighter. On October 16, 2013, it was announced that Middleditch would star in Penn Zero: Part-Time Hero. In 2015, he co-starred in The Final Girls and The Bronze. Also in 2015, he began streaming video games on Twitch.

In 2014 he joined a CollegeHumor series on YouTube called CAMP.

Middleditch voiced Harold Hutchins in Captain Underpants: The First Epic Movie (2017). As of 2017, Middleditch has appeared in Verizon commercials. In 2019, he appeared in Godzilla: King of the Monsters and NBA 2K20.

In April 2020, Middleditch and Ben Schwartz starred in Netflix's improv special Middleditch and Schwartz.

In October 2020, Middleditch began playing Drew Dunbar in the CBS series B Positive.

In 2022, Middleditch was announced as a collaborator on Pillage Party, a co‑developed original video game project for PC and consoles developed by Australian studio PlaySide. It was planned for release in 2023 on PC and consoles but was never published.

In June 2025, Middleditch was announced as Chief Creative Officer of a revived Commodore.

== Personal life ==
Middleditch became engaged to costume designer Mollie Gates in June 2015. They married on August 22, 2015. In a 2019 Playboy interview, he revealed they had an open relationship and said swinging "saved our marriage". In May 2020, Gates filed for divorce. The divorce was finalized in April 2021.

Middleditch stated during a January 2022 appearance on The Late Show with Stephen Colbert that he had become a U.S. citizen.

=== Sexual misconduct allegations ===
In March 2021, the Los Angeles Times published allegations that Middleditch sexually harassed and groped multiple women at Cloak & Dagger, a goth club co-founded and owned by Adam Bravin of the music duo She Wants Revenge. One of the women revealed messages from Middleditch in which he apologized to her privately.

== Filmography ==
=== Film ===
Year	Title	Role	Notes
2009	The Rebound	Maverick	
2010	Splinterheads	Justin Frost	
2010	The Other Guys	Art Exhibition Curator	Uncredited Cameo
2010	Night Home	James	Short film
2011	Certainty	Game Guy	
2011	Michel Jean-Michel: Overexposed	Michel Jean-Michel	Short film
2012	Being Flynn	Richard	
2012	The Campaign	Travis	
2012	The Brass Teapot	Gilad	
2012	Fun Size	Manuel Fuzzy	
2013	The Kings of Summer	Rookie Cop	Cameo
2013	The Wolf of Wall Street	Stratton Broker in a Bowtie	Cameo
2014	Someone Marry Barry	Kurt	
2014	Search Party	Daniel "Nardo Narducci	
2015	SMILF	Dan	Short film that inspired the TV series SMILF
2015	The Bronze	Ben Lawfort	
2015	The Final Girls	Duncan	
2016	Joshy	Josh	
2016	Sunspring	H	Short film
2017	Kong: Skull Island	Jerry (voice)	
2017	Entanglement	Ben Layten	
2017	Captain Underpants: The First Epic Movie	Harold Hutchins (voice)	Also songwriter for "Saturday"
2017	Once Upon a Time in Venice	John	
2018	Tag	Dave	
2018	Replicas	Ed Whittle	
2018	Henchmen	Lester (voice)	
2019	Jake and Kyle Get Wedding Dates	Kyle Westen (voice)	Direct-to-video
2019	Godzilla: King of the Monsters	Sam Coleman	
2019	Zombieland: Double Tap	Flagstaff	
2020	Phineas and Ferb the Movie: Candace Against the Universe	Garnoz (voice)	
2022	DC League of Super-Pets	Keith (voice)	
2024	Messy	Max	

=== Television ===
Year	Title	Role	Notes
2010	Robotomy	Additional voices	Episode: "Bling Thing"
2011	Ugly Americans	Additional voices	Episode: "Wet Hot Demonic Summer"
2011	Beavis and Butt-Head	Stewart Stevenson, Teacher	7 episodes
2011	The League	Julian	Episode: "The Light of Genesis"
2011	Fact Checkers Unit	Kerry	Episode: "Fly Like a Buttress"
2013	Newsreaders	Micah Berkley	Episode: "Auto Erotic"
2013	The Office	Jeb Schrute	Episode: "The Farm"
2013	Key and Peele	Monsieur Thénardier	Episode: "Les Mis"
2013	Trophy Wife	Nurse Terry	Episode: "Lice and Beary White"
2013	The Pete Holmes Show	Gambit, Nightcrawler	2 episodes
2014–2019	Silicon Valley	Richard Hendricks	Main cast
2014–2019	You're the Worst	Hipster Ringleader	2 episodes
2014–2017	Penn Zero: Part-Time Hero	Penn Zero (voice)	Main role (61 episodes); also writer: "Ultrahyperball"
2015	Scheer-RL	Jeff Timons	Episode: "98 Degrees"
2015	Comedy Bang! Bang!	Himself, Tim Landers	2 episodes
2015–2019	Drunk History	Various	3 episodes
2016	Great Minds with Dan Harmon	William Shakespeare	Episode: "William Shakespeare"
2016	TripTank	Warlock, Caller (voice)	Episode: "TripTank 2025"
2017	Animals.	Simon (voice)	Episode: "Rats"
2017	Rick and Morty	King Tommy (voice)	Episode: "The ABC's of Beth"
2018–2019	Bob's Burgers	Alex (voice)	3 episodes
2018–2019	Last Week Tonight with John Oliver	Narrator	2 episodes
2019–2025	Big City Greens	Donny Tinselton, Bash, various (voice)	4 episodes
2020	Middleditch and Schwartz	Himself	Main role; also creator and executive producer
2020	Death Hacks	Adam (voice)	Main role
2020	Dream Corp LLC	Virgil Bottoms	Episode: "Virgil Bottoms"
2020–2025	Solar Opposites	Terry Opposites (voice)	Main role
2020–2022	B Positive	Drew Dunbar	Main role
2021	Amphibia	Bernardo (voice)	Episode: "Bessie & MicroAngelo"
2022	The Good Fight	Kyle Vespertine-Kalepark	Episode: "The End of Playing Games"

=== Web ===
Year	Title	Role	Notes
2009	Memoirs of a Manchild	Danny Nanners	3 episodes; also writer and producer
2010	The Back Room	Die Antwoord	Episode: "Steve Agee"
2009–2013	CollegeHumor Originals	Various characters	20 episodes
2011	Funny or Die	Woodshed Guy	Episode: "2.8"
2011	Matumbo Goldberg	Lenny	5 episodes
2011–2015	Jake and Amir	Penis Anthony "Doobs" Doubligné	6 episodes
2012	Bravest Warriors	Professor Fartsparkles (voice)	Episode: "Time Slime"
2013	The Funtime Gang	Randy the Racoon	Episode: "Pilot"
2013	The Morning After	Dave	5 episodes
2016	HarmonQuest	Dildo Bogpelt	Episode: "The Doors of Fores"
2019	This Giant Beast That is the Global Economy	Guest Star	Episode: "Money Laundering: A How-To Guide"
2020	Stream of Blood: Vampires of Pittsburgh	Miles Vanderbuck	30 episodes

=== Video games ===
Year	Title	Role	Notes
2013	Star Wars: The Old Republic - Rise of the Hutt Cartel	Additional voices	
2019	NBA 2K20	Zach Bailey	Voice and motion capture
2022	Warped Kart Racers	Terry	Archival audio
2022	High on Life	Ranchy	

== Theater ==
Year	Title	Role	Venue	Notes	Ref.
2024–2025	Eureka Day	Eli	Samuel J. Friedman Theatre		

== Awards and nominations ==
Year	Association	Category	Nominated work	Result
2014	Critics' Choice Television Awards	Best Actor in a Comedy Series	Silicon Valley	Nominated
2014	Satellite Awards	Best Actor – Television Series Musical or Comedy	Silicon Valley	Nominated
2015	Critics' Choice Television Awards	Best Actor in a Comedy Series	Silicon Valley	Nominated
2015	Satellite Awards	Best Actor – Television Series Musical or Comedy	Silicon Valley	Nominated
2016	Primetime Emmy Awards	Outstanding Lead Actor in a Comedy Series	Silicon Valley	Nominated
2016	Satellite Awards	Best Actor – Television Series Musical or Comedy	Silicon Valley	Nominated
2016	Gold Derby Awards	Best Comedy Actor	Silicon Valley	Nominated
2017	Critics' Choice Television Awards	Best Actor in a Comedy Series	Silicon Valley	Nominated
2017	Satellite Awards	Best Actor – Television Series Musical or Comedy	Silicon Valley	Nominated
2020	Satellite Awards	Best Actor – Television Series Musical or Comedy	Silicon Valley	Won
