= Skirball Center for the Performing Arts =

Theater in Manhattan, New York

Jack H. Skirball Center for the Performing Arts
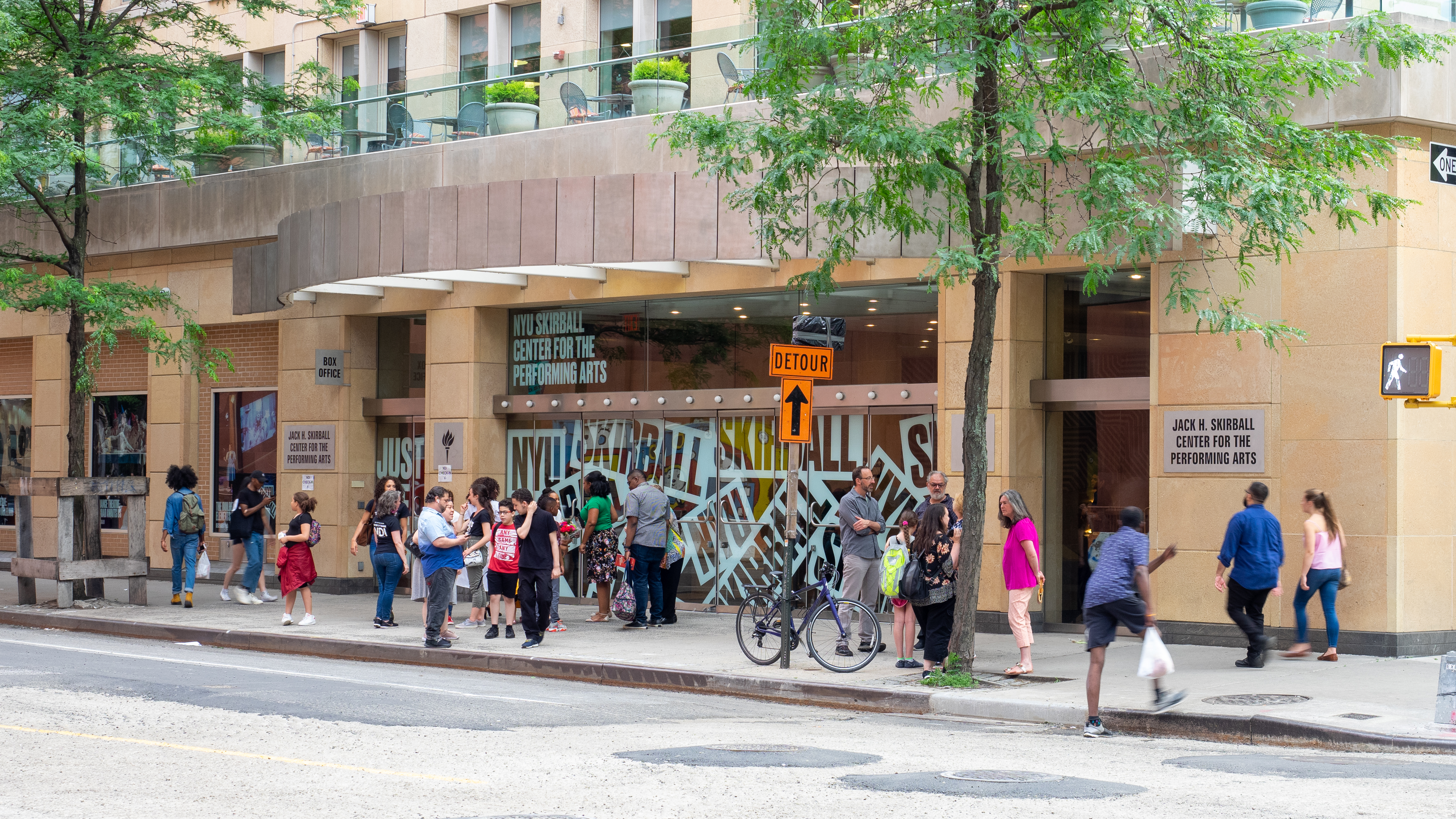
- Entrance, 2019
- Interactive map of Jack H. Skirball Center for the Performing Arts
- Address: 566 LaGuardia Place; New York City; United States
- Coordinates: 40.7298°N 73.9997°W
- Owner: New York University
- Capacity: 850
- Current use: Performing arts venue
- Public transit: West Fourth Street–Washington Square station

Construction
- Opened: October 2003; 22 years ago
- Architects: Kevin Roche, John Dinkeloo and Associates

Website
- nyuskirball.org

The Jack H. Skirball Center for the Performing Arts, generally known as NYU Skirball, is an 850-seat theater at 566 LaGuardia Place in Manhattan, New York, owned by New York University. It was named after philanthropist Jack H. Skirball. The theatre was completed in October 2003 and cost approximately $40 million. The architect was Kevin Roche, John Dinkeloo and Associates. The institution typically presents two seasons of curated public performances, talks, and events per year.

== Arts programs ==
NYU Skirball presents live events in genres ranging from dance, theater and performing arts to comedy, music and film. It is known for presenting international contemporary performing artists including Anne Teresa de Keersmaeker, Toshiki Okada, Jérôme Bel, and Forced Entertainment as well as local artists such as Elevator Repair Service, The Wooster Group, Big Dance Theater, and International Contemporary Ensemble (ICE). The Netflix long-form improv comedy special series Middleditch and Schwartz was filmed at Skirball. NYU Skirball connects academics with performing artists in their "Office Hours" video series and "Indefinite Articles" commissioned essays. It also screens film broadcasts of theater productions from National Theatre Live and hosts talks by speakers from politics, arts, sciences, academia, and more. Past speakers include John Kerry, Al Gore, Justin Trudeau among others.
