= Storming of Bolton =

1644 event in the First English Civil War

- Part of First English Civil War
Date	28 May 1644
Location	Bolton, Lancashire, England 53°34′42″N 2°25′48″W
Result	Royalist victory

Belligerents
Royalists	Parliamentarians

Commanders and leaders
Prince Rupert	Alexander Rigby

Strength
2,000 cavalry 6,000 infantry	c. 4,000

Casualties and losses
Unknown	78–2,000 (Note: Will Coster has looked at the figures and states: Estimates for the dead at Bolton have ranged from two hundred up to two thousand. Even the lower figure would have made this the worst massacre in the war for loss of life. However the parish register of the town gives the names of only seventy-eight individuals, noting "All those of Botonn slayne on the 28 of May, 1644", which seems to imply that the list is comprehensive. Perhaps more significantly, all three individuals mentioned as murdered in the anonymous parliamentarian eyewitness account published three months later were also named in the register. However, the parish register may exclude defending troops not from the town, who are known to have been present, and those buried elsewhere. The parliamentary account mentions the number of 1,200 or 1,500 murdered. Such a figure is given credence by the fact royalist accounts speak of 1,600 or even two thousand killed. But these versions may have taken their lead from parliamentary propaganda. It is only the seventy-eight named individuates including two women, but at least some soldiers, that can be said with any certainty, to have been killed.)

Lancashire and Bolton

The Storming of Bolton, sometimes referred to as the "Bolton massacre", was an event in the First English Civil War which happened on 28 May 1644. The strongly Parliamentarian town was stormed and captured by Royalist forces under Prince Rupert. It was alleged that up to 1,600 of Bolton's defenders and inhabitants were slaughtered during and after the fighting. The "massacre at Bolton" became a staple of Parliamentarian propaganda.

== Background ==
In Lancashire, before the start of the civil war, there was social and economic tension between towns which generally supported Parliament, and the landowning gentry and aristocracy who controlled the rural areas and mostly supported the king as Royalists. There was a religious divide with some towns supporting dissenting nonconformist or puritan movements. Bolton was known as the "Geneva of the north", a reference to the city in Switzerland which was a centre of Calvinism.

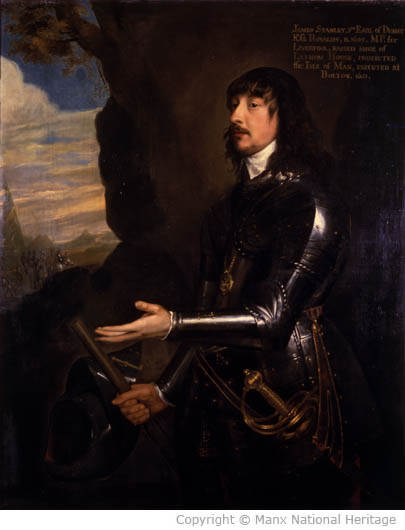
James Stanley, 7th Earl of Derby, was executed in Bolton in 1651.

The major Royalist figure in Lancashire was James Stanley, 7th Earl of Derby. He was slow to take measures to secure the county at the start of the civil war in 1642, and after setbacks the following year, including two failed attempts to capture Bolton, he temporarily abandoned the contest in Lancashire to secure the other area in which he held major interests, the Isle of Man. The only threat to Parliamentarian control of Lancashire came from Cheshire, where a Royalist army under John Byron, 1st Baron Byron, was formed in late 1643. On 26 January 1644, Byron was defeated at the Battle of Nantwich by Parliamentarians under Sir William Brereton and Sir Thomas Fairfax, leaving Parliamentarians in control of the area.

Fairfax's army and some Lancashire Parliamentarians under Colonel Alexander Rigby began the Siege of Lathom House, seat of the Earl of Derby, which was defended by his wife, the Countess of Derby. However, Fairfax crossed the Pennines in late March to rejoin his father, Lord Fairfax, in Yorkshire.

== Campaign ==
The Royalists had intended to send the king's nephew and foremost field commander, Prince Rupert, to the northwest to retrieve the situation early in 1644. Rupert set up headquarters in Shrewsbury, from where he led a force to the Relief of Newark. It became even more important to regain the northwest when the Fairfaxes and a Scottish Covenanter army began the Siege of York on 22 April. As Rupert lacked the strength to proceed immediately to relieve York, it was agreed at a council of war in Oxford, the king's wartime capital, that he would first move into Lancashire to restore Royalist fortunes, use the Earl of Derby's influence to gather fresh recruits, and secure the port of Liverpool to allow communications with Royalist forces in Ireland.

Rupert, accompanied by the Earl of Derby, marched north from Shrewsbury on 16 May. He added Byron's army from Cheshire and North Wales to his own small force, giving him a total of 2,000 cavalry and 6,000 infantry. To cross the Mersey he had to secure a crossing at either Warrington or Stockport. He chose the latter, and stormed it on 25 May. The town was not fortified, and after a brief contest outside the town in the late evening the defenders fled to Manchester.

On hearing of the loss of Stockport, Colonel Rigby's forces abandoned the siege of Lathom House and retired to Bolton, where the garrison was commanded by Colonel Shuttleworth.

== Storming ==
Late on 28 May, as Prince Rupert approached Bolton, he sent Colonel Henry Tillier, his quartermaster-general, with a regiment of horse (cavalry) and another of foot (infantry) to secure the town. They found the Parliamentarians retiring from Lathom House arriving in confusion. On hearing this, Prince Rupert hastened his march and attacked immediately, in pouring rain. Nevertheless, the Parliamentarians manned a defensive line around the town with 4,000 men. Rupert's first assault, by the regiments of foot commanded by colonels Ellice, Tyldesley, Warren and Tillier, and his own regiment of foot commanded by Lieutenant Colonel John Russell, was repulsed with 300 casualties. Russell was wounded and his major was taken prisoner.

Prince Rupert then ordered the regiment of Colonel Broughton to renew the attack. Led by the Earl of Derby, they were successful, and fighting continued in the streets until the Parliamentarian forces were overcome or had fled. The Royalists claimed that there were 1,000 Parliamentarian casualties and that in addition to 50 officers and 600 other prisoners, the Royalists captured 20 standards, 20 barrels of powder and many weapons.

The Parliamentarian commander, Colonel Alexander Rigby, escaped in the confusion, having learned the Royalist password. He made his way to the Parliamentarian and Covenanter "Army of Both Kingdoms" besieging York, where he claimed that 1,500 of his total force had been poorly armed clubmen. He also claimed that he lost only 200 men, the rest of his forces having fled, but the commanders of the armies around York noted that "vulgar reports" were that they had been slaughtered.

== Causes ==
The storming was a particularly brutal episode in the Civil War and several factors may have contributed to the nature of the action. Unlike a formal siege, usually preceded by parleys and often ended at some point by a negotiated surrender, Rupert attacked suddenly to catch the Parliamentarians in temporary disarray. Without any possibility of negotiation, there was little protection from the "laws" or contemporary conventions of warfare for any of the garrison who did not surrender or flee immediately. As fighting took place in the streets of the town, the citizens were caught up in the fighting and because the battle took place at night and in heavy rain, it was difficult to distinguish between citizens and armed combatants. The Royalist soldiers were allowed to plunder the town after the fighting as a reward, and citizens may have died during the ensuing rapine.

At least two of the attacking Royalist regiments (Warren's and Broughton's) had been raised in England in 1640 to serve in the Bishops' Wars but were sent to Ireland after the Irish Rebellion of 1641. They returned to serve in the Royalist armies in England in 1644 after King Charles negotiated a ceasefire with Confederate Ireland. The Parliamentarians nevertheless believed that they consisted of Irish Catholics. The Royalists claimed that at some point during the fighting, the Parliamentarians hanged a captured Irishman as a "Papist", enraging the attackers. Tyldesley's regiment had been raised in Lancashire and included many Roman Catholics.

== Effects and subsequent events ==
After storming Bolton, Rupert's army rested at Bury, where it was reinforced. He then advanced on Liverpool and opened a siege and bombardment on 6 June. At midday on 10 June, having made breaches in the earth walls with cannon fire, the Royalists launched an assault which was beaten back. During the following night, the Parliamentarians abandoned the town and left aboard ships in the harbour, leaving their colours on the remains of the walls as a ruse. When Colonel Henry Tillier's regiment (another unit recently returned from Ireland) advanced into the town the next morning, they found 400 remaining defenders "of the meaner sorte", many of whom were killed, only some being given quarter.

The only remaining major Parliamentarian foothold in Lancashire was Manchester, which was heavily defended and could not have been captured without a prolonged siege. Rupert was instructed by King Charles to hasten to the relief of York which he relieved on 1 July. The next day, he offered battle to the besieging armies and was decisively defeated at the Battle of Marston Moor. He withdrew to Lancashire, and subsequently went south to rejoin the King.

Lord Byron was left to hold the north-west. On 19 August, his cavalry was defeated at the Battle of Ormskirk, and the Royalists abandoned Lancashire. Bolton was recaptured, without any noteworthy fighting, in September. On 18 September, Byron's army was destroyed while attempting to prevent a relief of Montgomery Castle. Parliamentarians commanded by Sir John Meldrum recaptured Liverpool on 1 November. Meldrum spared the garrison, including soldiers returned from or recruited in Ireland, despite a Parliamentarian ordinance of no quarter to the Irish. Lathom House was besieged again from July 1644, but held out until 2 December 1645.

== Death of the Earl of Derby ==
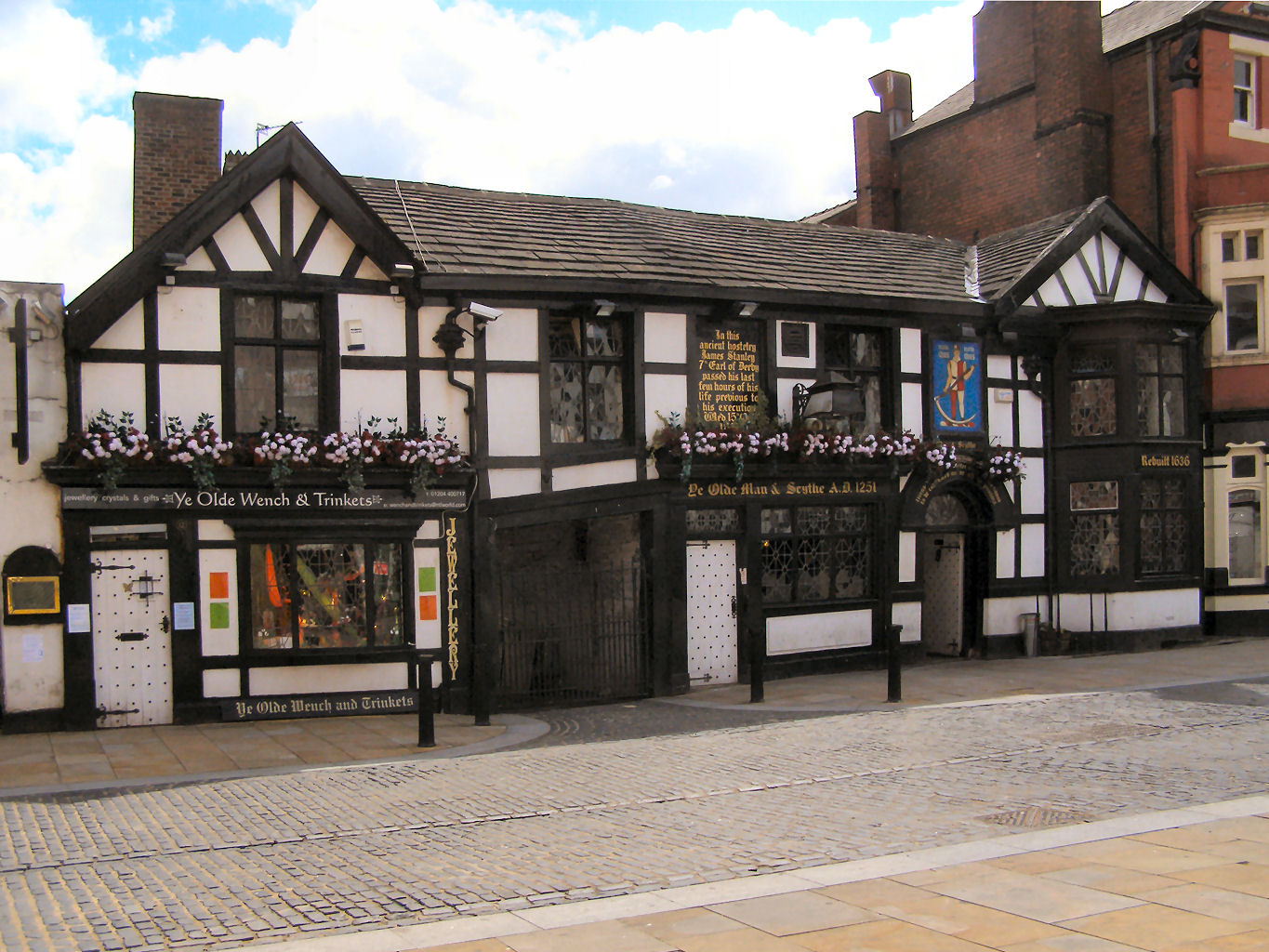
Ye Olde Man and Scythe

At the end of the Third English Civil War the Earl of Derby travelled north and was captured near Nantwich and given quarter. However, he was tried by court-martial at Chester on 29 September 1651. His quarter was disallowed and he was condemned to death for treason (i.e., for communicating with King Charles II). His appeal for pardon was rejected and he escaped, but he was recaptured by Captain Hector Schofield. On 15 October 1651, he was taken to Bolton, where he reputedly spent his last hours at Ye Olde Man & Scythe public house, but more likely in a house on Churchgate, before being beheaded near the Market Cross on Churchgate.

== See also ==
- List of massacres in Great Britain

== Sources ==
- Casserly, David (2010), Massacre, The Storming of Bolton, Amberley Publishing, ISBN 978-1-84868-976-3
- Clews, Nic (25 January 2011), Bolton's Social history
- Coster, Will (1999), "Massacre and codes of conduct in the English Civil War", in Levene, Mark; Roberts, Penny (eds.), The Massacre in History (illustrated ed.), Berghahn Books, pp. 96–97, ISBN 978-1-57181-935-2
- Farrer, William; Brownbill, J, eds. (1911), "Great Bolton", A History of the County of Lancaster: Volume 5, British History Online
- Lewis, Samuel (1848), "Lathom", A Topographical Dictionary of England, British History Online, pp. 30–33
- Tincey, John (2003), Marston Moor 1644: The Beginning Of The End, Osprey, p. 33, ISBN 1-84176-334-9
- Young, Peter (1970), Marston Moor 1644: The Campaign and the Battle, Kineton: Roundwood, ISBN 1-900624-09-5
- Young, Peter; Holmes, Richard (2000), The English Civil War, Ware: Wordsworth Editions, ISBN 1-84022-222-0
