= First Battle of Middlewich =

Battle during the First English Civil War

- Part of the First English Civil War
Date	13 March 1643
Location	Middlewich, England 53.192°N 2.443°W
Result	Parliamentarian victory

Belligerents
Royalists	Parliamentarians

Commanders and leaders
Thomas Aston	Sir William Brereton
- Location within England

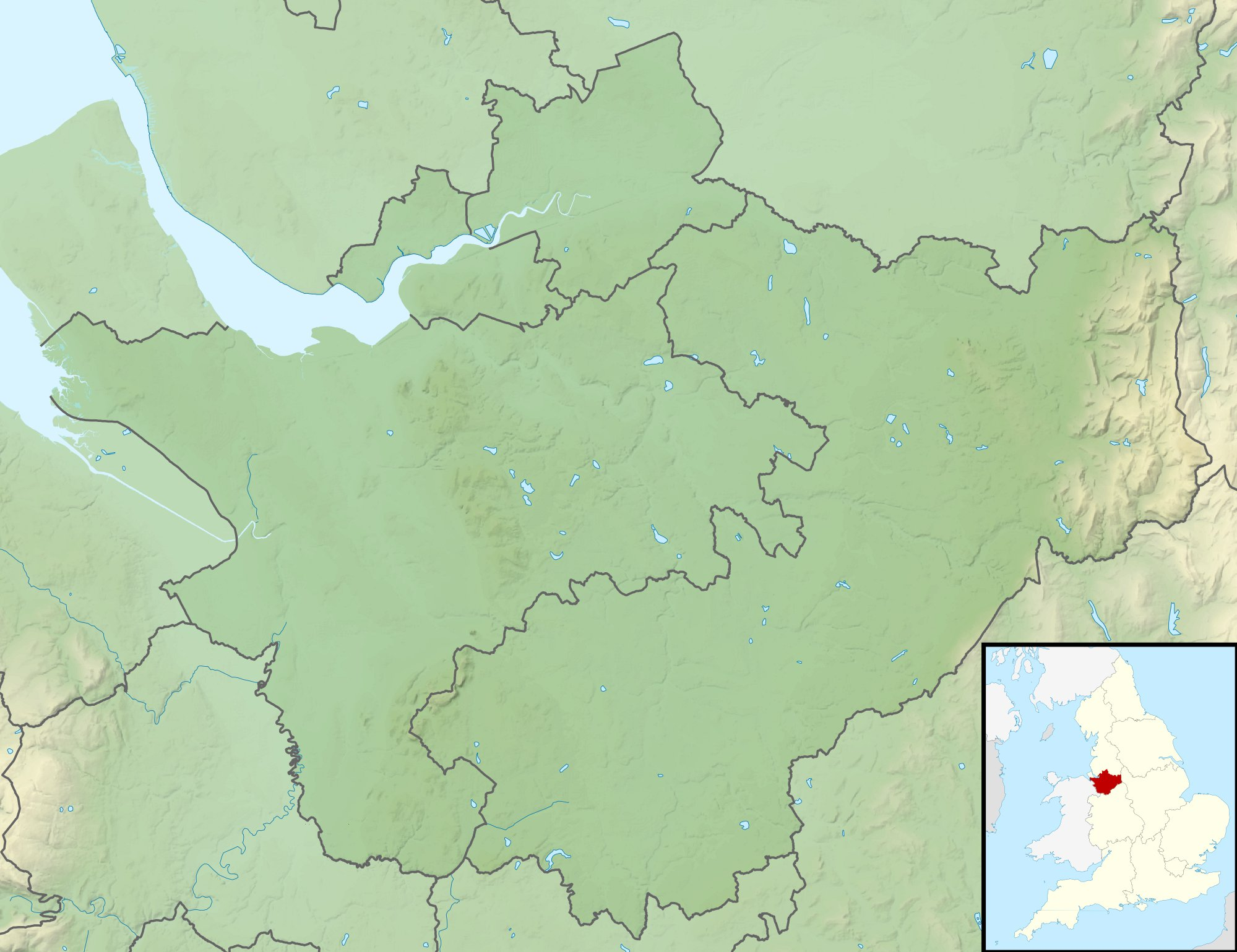
Cheshire County and the Battle of Middlewich

The First Battle of Middlewich took place on 13 March 1643, (Note: The date is adjusted to show the year starting on 1 January but retaining the Julian calendar, and all other dates in this article use this convention. This is type of dating is the norm in modern articles about the English Civil War. See Old Style and New Style dates for more details on this issue.) during the First English Civil War, and was fought between the Parliamentarians, under Sir William Brereton, and the Royalist supporters of King Charles I of England, under Sir Thomas Aston.

== Background ==
In the summer of 1642 came the final split between the King and Parliament and both sides made preparations for raising an army. Throughout the summer the Commissioners of Array for the King and Deputy Lieutenants for Parliament attempted to raise the Trained Bands and to seize the magazine in every county. During the confusion caused by the troops waiting to be shipped from Chester to Ireland to suppress the rebellion there, Sir William Brereton, the Parliamentary representative in Cheshire, turned to what was virtually recruiting. He found himself opposed by Sir Thomas Aston and all the resident Cheshire nobility and he failed in his attempt to secure Chester for the Parliament.

At this time Aston was probably the recognized representative of the King in the county and was able to present the latter with a list of men willing to serve in the King's army. The King decided to base this army at Shrewsbury and when he arrived there on 20 September 1642 he wrote to Lord Kilmorey, Lord Cholmondeley and "the other of the subscribers for Horse in Cheshire" telling them to deliver their horses into the charge of Aston who was to bring the forces raised to Shrewsbury to join with the main body of the army. Charles made it unnecessary for Aston to leave for Shrewsbury as he instead came to Chester and it was from here that he issued, on 26 September, an order for the seizure of arms and horses from those people who had carried out Parliament's Militia Ordinance in Cheshire. These were to be delivered to Aston who was able to leave with the King at the head of three troops of horse.

Aston obviously conducted himself satisfactorily in the campaign culminating in the Battle of Edgehill because an order from Prince Rupert in January 1643 refers to him as a colonel of a regiment of cuirassiers, and two days later on 19 January the King announced that he was sending Aston as a major-general to Cheshire and Lancashire. Aston's orders were simply stated by Prince Rupert; he was to take his regiment to Shropshire, raise forces of horse and foot there, and then defend Cheshire against the Parliamentary force that was heading to the county from London under the leadership of Brereton. He was also to seize arms and ammunition for the King's use and "put into execution the laws and customs martial upon all offenders.....for the better preventing of disorders, plunderings and outrages which are often committed by soldiers." He was told to achieve this and return to the main army by 15 March unless he received orders to the contrary.

The preparations for Aston's march and arrival in Cheshire reveal the King's interest in keeping Cheshire Royalist. The authorities of the areas that Aston was to pass through on his way from Oxford to Cheshire were ordered to provide food and lodgings for his men. The Cheshire Commissioners of Array were also given explicit orders as to what they should do to help Aston. The King explained to them that, as the Parliamentarians had rejected the Bunbury Agreement and were sending a force to Cheshire, he was sending Aston and his regiment of horse to protect the county. The commissioners were to assemble the trained bands and summon Quarter Sessions to decide on a method of raising money to pay the soldiers. They were also to help Aston raise a regiment of dragoons and seize arms from "malignants" to arm them. In addition the parishes were to supply them horses.

Parliament also realised how important Cheshire was and sent Brereton to raise support for its cause. Geographically Cheshire lies between the Pennines and the Welsh hills and so whoever controlled Cheshire controlled the north – south corridor. For the Parliament, the control of Cheshire would mean separating the King's northern supporters from the King and his army at Oxford. It could also stop the King from bringing in reinforcements from his Irish army through the port of Chester.

When Aston arrived in Shropshire he found that there were only 60 dragoons instead of the 600 promised. The authorities promised him another 200 and so he decided to wait for two days before moving on to Cheshire. During this time he was ordered to Stafford to help the sheriff there (perhaps against the Moorlanders who had risen for Parliament). However Aston did not neglect his prime objective and ordered the Cheshire Commissioners of Array to defend Nantwich with 150 musketeers and to inform him of Brereton's progress. Neither order was carried out and Aston was not informed until it was too late to arrive at Nantwich before Brereton.

=== Skirmish at Nantwich ===
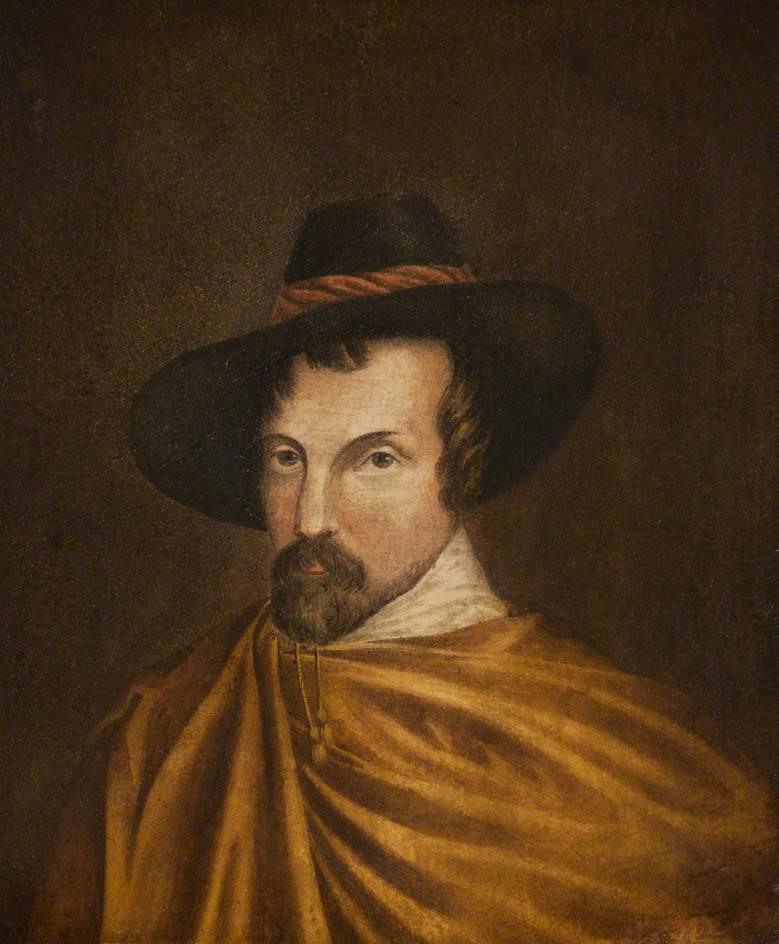
Sir William Brereton

Brereton, meanwhile, had ridden into Congleton on the evening of 27 January with his own troop of horse and three companies of dragoons. Although he was joined in Congleton by the former mayor, William Edwards, with another troop of horse, his whole force could not have amounted to more than about 500 men. His mission, however, was not to conquer Cheshire but to rouse and organize the Parliamentary sympathizers in it. He had with him the cadre of a foot regiment, a case of drakes (small cannons about 7½ feet long) and 700 muskets in his baggage train as well as an experienced Scottish professional, Major James Lothian, to train recruits. He had wide powers to construct fortifications and raise more men and was to finance the whole enterprise by voluntary payment and distraint upon the rent and goods of local Royalists.

He approached Nantwich on 28 January. not just "to releave the town, beinge in greate danger to be plundered and destroyed by the Kings Armye and Commissioners of Array", but also because it offered the only alternative to Chester as a county headquarters. It had sufficient wealth and housing to accommodate a large garrison and staff and was the centre of a network of roads leading to the Midlands and London, to North Wales, Lancashire, Yorkshire and Scotland.

Brereton sent ahead 50 dragoons under Lothian to occupy the town and they got there before Aston who had finally been informed of Brereton's progress by Orlando Bridgeman, the son of the Bishop of Chester. Aston had with him his own troop of horse and some companies of Shropshire dragoons under the command of Colonel Sir Vincent Corbet totalling about 500 men. Despite his superiority of numbers Aston failed to take the town and at dusk he retreated eastwards down Hospital Street. In a narrow lane his force met the remainder of Brereton's force and confusion was the result. A company of Brereton's dragoons dismounted but failed to leave anyone to control the horses which bolted into the fields and were taken by the Royalists for charging cavalry. The confusion was added to when some Parliamentarians loaded and fired one of the drakes. This does not seem to have caused any injury but the flash and the roar amid the general confusion frightened the Royalists so much "that they weire all scattered and quyte Rowted".

Aston turned up eventually at Whitchurch and, although he claimed the skirmish as a draw, his distance from Nantwich and his appeals for reinforcements indicates that the skirmish was a defeat for the Royalists, likely due to his men being exhausted after the long march from Oxford and that he did not receive the support from the Cheshire Commissioners of Array that he had expected. This lack of proper support continued over the next four or five weeks. An agreement was made to raise a contribution in the county to pay the soldiers but most was paid to the upkeep of the Chester garrison, not to Aston's regiment or to the trained bands. The Royalist leaders were never able to agree to a unified command which meant that they were never able to field an army that would outnumber Brereton's force. There was a force of 2,000 men at Warrington under the Earl of Derby, a Welsh force of 1,000 men at Chester and the Shropshire force at Whitchurch. These never combined and it was not until March that the Royalists decided to choose a place in the county "to summon in the King's friends".

== Prelude ==
Aston set out for Middlewich on Friday 10 March. His progress was delayed that night when his men, who had yet to be paid, mutinied. Apparently the money and provisions were issued on Saturday but it was so late that Aston had to leave two troops of horse in the forest to guard it - "though they lay in danger that night." It is not known why Middlewich was chosen as opposed to the much safer Knutsford where it would have been possible to retreat to Warrington if necessary. In his account of the battle of Middlewich, Aston did not say why he came to Middlewich on 11 March but explained that he had no wish to linger there. He realized the dangers of staying in an open town with enemy forces at both Northwich and Nantwich. Brereton, who was recruiting in Northwich, commented on the boldness of the Royalists for camping at Middlewich. He believed it resulted from overconfidence in their ability to win over the county and rid it of the Parliamentarians.

== Saturday 11 March ==
Aston arrived at Middlewich with about 500 mounted troops and over 1000 of the trained bands of the Broxton and Wirral Hundreds plus three cannons. William Brereton sent a strong party of horse from Northwich "who gave them an alarm." Aston had meanwhile received a letter from the Governor of Chester, Sir Nicolas Byron, telling him that if he provided an escort for the family and goods of Lord Brereton to Chester then the latter, who was a relative of Sir William Brereton, would provide men for Aston. Although reluctant to linger in Middlewich, Thomas, after consulting with the sheriff, Sir Edward Fitton and Colonel Ellice, decided it was worth waiting for another day. He therefore sent a letter to Lord Brereton urging him to act immediately even though it meant travelling on a Sunday.

== Sunday 12 March ==
Brereton, wanting to "annoy" the enemy, set out with two or three companies of dragoons to give alarm at Middlewich. He had no intention of attacking but wanted to harass the Royalists. In the meantime Lord Brereton had not done as Aston requested but instead came to Middlewich to confer further. Thomas believed that Lord Brereton's presence in Middlewich led to the attack by the Parliamentarians because they wanted to prevent the Royalists from joining forces. Sir William Brereton however, in his account of the battle, made it clear that he attacked because he believed a Royalist presence in Middlewich posed too much of a threat to be ignored.

In order to confer with Lord Brereton and also the sheriff's desire to "sumon the countrey with theire contribucon and assistance, necessitated a ioynt consent to stay there on Monday." Realising the danger posed by this decision Aston asked that the governor use the Whitchurch forces to threaten the Parliamentarians at Nantwich. According to the Commissioners of Array the Whitchurch force was not ordered to threaten Nantwich. In any case the forces there had been disbanded. Aston's fears were well founded as Brereton arranged to meet the Nantwich forces at six o'clock the next morning and to make a joint attack on Middlewich.

== Battle ==
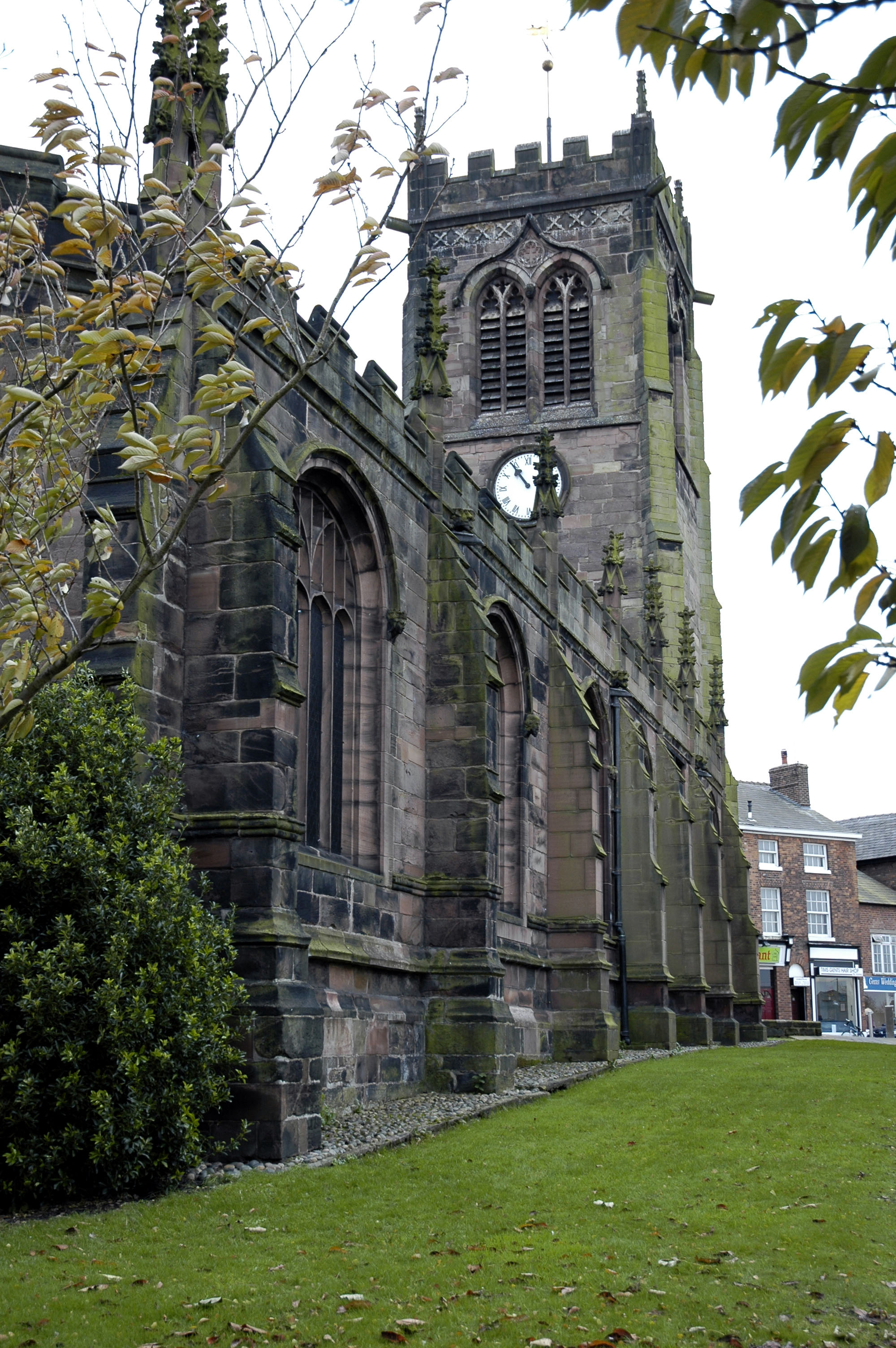
St Michael and All Angels Middlewich, England - scene of the First Battle of Middlewich (1643)

On the morning of Monday 13 March the Nantwich forces had not arrived at the appointed time so Brereton decided to attack with his cavalry and about 200 musketeers ("our greatest force of foot being at Nantwich"). He "with the best forces hee had theire came early in the mornynge backe to Midlewiche, & vpon Sheathe Heathe att the west end of the said Towne, Sr Thomas Aston havinge taken the advantage of the said ground & wynde, & planted his ordnance, sett upon him". Thomas sent a party of dragoons and horse under Captain Spotswood to give an alarm at Northwich, presumably to draw off some of Brereton's force. The captain, however, disobeyed orders and engaged the enemy and as a result Brereton's forces were able to establish themselves in one street leading into the town. In another street Captain Prestwich and his men were caught unawares by the enemy but were able to rally and drive back the enemy horse and rescue some prisoners. He stopped at a bridge and managed to hold off the enemy until the foot soldiers arrived. Waring Bridge was also approached by the enemy so Aston sent Prestwich and his troop to aid Captain Massie's company of foot. In this way Aston was able to hold off the enemy until about 09:00 or 10:00 a.m. when the Nantwich force arrived "so resolutely and with such undauntedness of spirit." About 800 foot and 300 horse came down Booth Lane and entered into Newton at the south end of the town, where Aston had placed "a good Brasse peece of ordnance" and two trained bands of 200 men who were "well advantaged by ditches and bankes on both sides." Aston withdrew a troop of horse under the command of Captain Bridgeman from the Northwich approach to check the advance of the Nantwich force. The rest of his horse he held back behind the foot, "there being noe other ground for horse", apart from a force of about 60 to attack the enemy. His plan was to line the hedge with about 100 musketeers so that the enemy could not take advantage of the ditches on both sides of the lane to attack the charging horse.

The Parliamentary force, on finding the lane so well defended, took to the fields on either side of the lane. The Royalist horse could not charge because of the hedges and the musketeers deserted as soon as the first shots were fired at them. The horse was therefore outflanked and cut off by the enemy musketeers on both sides of the lane. On the west side of the town the troop of horse, under Mayor Thomas Holme, were managing to hold off the Parliamentarians despite the fact that Bridgeman's troop had been withdrawn to defend the southern entrance. However, when Sergeant Major Gilmore ordered his foot to retreat the horse were outflanked by enemy musketeers on either side of the lane behind the hedges where the horse could not charge. They were therefore forced back into the town. The street was defended by musketeers behind a breastwork but they ran away after blindly firing once. Similarly the foot soldiers guarding Waring Bridge were ordered to retreat and the Parliamentarians were able to enter the town from there. Meanwhile, the horse on the Nantwich approach were pulled back to allow the use of the cannon that Ellice had drawn up.

The Parliamentarians were advancing towards the St Michael and All Angels church from three directions so Aston ordered a party of Captain Spotswood's dragoons to secure and defend the churchyard. He also placed a guard at the breastworks on the west side of town and put a cannon in the churchyard to cover the street. A company of musketeers and two trained bands were brought up to hold off the advancing Nantwich force. These musketeers lay down in the ditches as soon as they came to Ellice's cannon and it was all Aston could do to get them up to the hedges with the other musketeers by riding among them "and with my sword I beat them up." This served no purpose because the soldiers would not lift their heads to see where to fire but instead shot their muskets into the air.

The Parliamentarians meanwhile had become encouraged by the inaccurate fire of the cannon and they charged the Royalist foot who promptly ran away, leaving Aston's cavalry exposed and unable to charge because of a large ditch. They therefore drew off to a safer position. Seeing this, a body of pikemen behind a breastwork further back ran away and "all the musqueteers placed for the defence of the street ende quit their trenches, having never seen the enemy or cause of feare, but their fellows flying." Aston, however, held his cavalry firm until Ellice could draw off his cannon and then ordered a retreat to the high street. Aston himself went to the churchyard expecting it to be defended as he had ordered. Instead he found all the foot soldiers in the church and he could not "draw out ten musqueteers out of the church would it have saved the world." Relying on his two cannon to cover two streets, Aston ordered his cavalry, being exposed to the advancing enemy on three sides, to regroup in a field at one end of the town. However, their way was blocked by a barricade erected by Spotswood and they became separated and were unable to regroup until they were well past Kinderton House.

Returning to the cannon Aston found that one had been deserted and the other being drawn off by a solitary cannoneer. With all the other men, including Ellice, in the church and refusing to come out, Aston was now alone:

"The enimy falling directly in three streets upon me, and discharging upon me in the church-yard, the horse marched out of sight. I alone, all I could possibly hope to doe was to rally the horse again if possible, to wheel about, and to fall in the rear of them"

In the maze of streets Aston lost contact with his cavalry, apart from a few stragglers, and had little hope of turning the disaster into success especially as the Parliamentarians had now taken the church. With it they captured Ellice, Gilmore, Moseley, ten captains and other officers, 400 common soldiers, weapons for 500 men, two barrels of matches, four barrels of powder and two cannons. Brereton, therefore, believed that "since the beginning of this unnatural war, God hath not given many more complete victories."

== Aftermath ==
=== Sir Thomas Aston ===
Aston sent a messenger to rally his cavalry at Rudheath intending to go on to Lord Brereton and collect his force. The cavalry were, however, beyond recall and so Aston went on his own to give an account of the battle and to see if Lord Brereton was still willing to support him. Finding that he was, Aston returned to Whitchurch to raise the Shropshire forces. However, the trained bands there had been disbanded leaving him no alternative but to return to Cheshire, rally his men and await his fate. He summed up his feelings about the battle thus:

"It is the plain truth, the enemy having no diversion, but att liberty with their full power to fall on us from all parts, were much too hard for us in a place not defensible. And without some more experienced foot officers, I must freely say no number will be found sufficient to withstand ready men."

He was withdrawn to Oxford and continued to command a cavalry regiment in the King's field army. In 1644 he fought as a brigadier of cavalry in Prince Maurice's army in the West of England and fought at the second Battle of Newbury but probably never returned to Cheshire (although at least two sources mention him being there in 1644). (Note: During the Civil War in 1644 Sir Thomas Aston's men exercised "all manor of outrages and intollerable taxes. They plundered Weaverham and the country about, carried off old men out of their houses, bound them together, tyde them to a cart and rove them through mire and water to that dungeon, where they lie without fire or light and now through extremities are so diseased, they are ready to give up the ghost." but does not state the source of the quote. Also John Vicars (see Online Sources below) stated that Brereton during the siege of Nantwich in 1644 "won a most famous Victory of the Lord Capell and the Lord Byron.....and Sir Thomas Aston also")

In 1645 Aston served in the West Country under George Goring until September or October when he decided to return home. He passed through Kidderminster and Stourbridge on his way to Cheshire. At the beginning of November he was captured by a Parliamentary force under the command of a certain Captain Stones "att or neere Banke" (possibly near Walsall) along with about 60 Royalists - presumably Cheshire men who had fought in Aston's regiment and who were also returning home. From there he was taken to prison at Stafford and placed under arrest. On 24 March 1646 Aston died of a fever brought on by his various wounds, including a blow to the head received during an unsuccessful attempt to escape.

=== Sir William Brereton ===
Brereton declared God responsible for him winning the battle:

"I desire the whole praise and glory may be attributed to Almighty God, who infused courage into them that stood for His cause, and struck the enemy with terror and amazement."

By the end of the spring Parliamentary forces, with Brereton as commander-in-chief, controlled five of the seven Hundreds of Cheshire. From this time on through to February 1646, when the last remaining Royalist base at Chester surrendered to him, the county was dominated by Brereton and he proved to be a dynamic war-time leader not just militarily but also politically and administratively. According to professor Ives, because of the importance of Cheshire, Brereton "had more influence on the outcome of the First English Civil War than Oliver Cromwell had." He suffered his only major defeat in December 1643 at the Second Battle of Middlewich. In 1646, when peace returned and his control over Cheshire came to an end, Brereton moved south to become an active London-based MP and politician. As a reward for his services he received the chief forestership of the Forest of Macclesfield and the seneschalship of the Hundred of Macclesfield. In 1651 he received the tenancy of the former archbishop's palace at Croydon in Surrey and he spent the last nine years of his life commuting between there and his ancestral home at Handforth, in Cheshire. He died on 7 April 1661 in Croydon and is presumed to have been buried in the family vault in the church at Cheadle in Cheshire, although he is recorded to have been buried in the churchyard of St John the Baptist, Croyon.
