= Second Battle of Middlewich =

- Part of First English Civil War
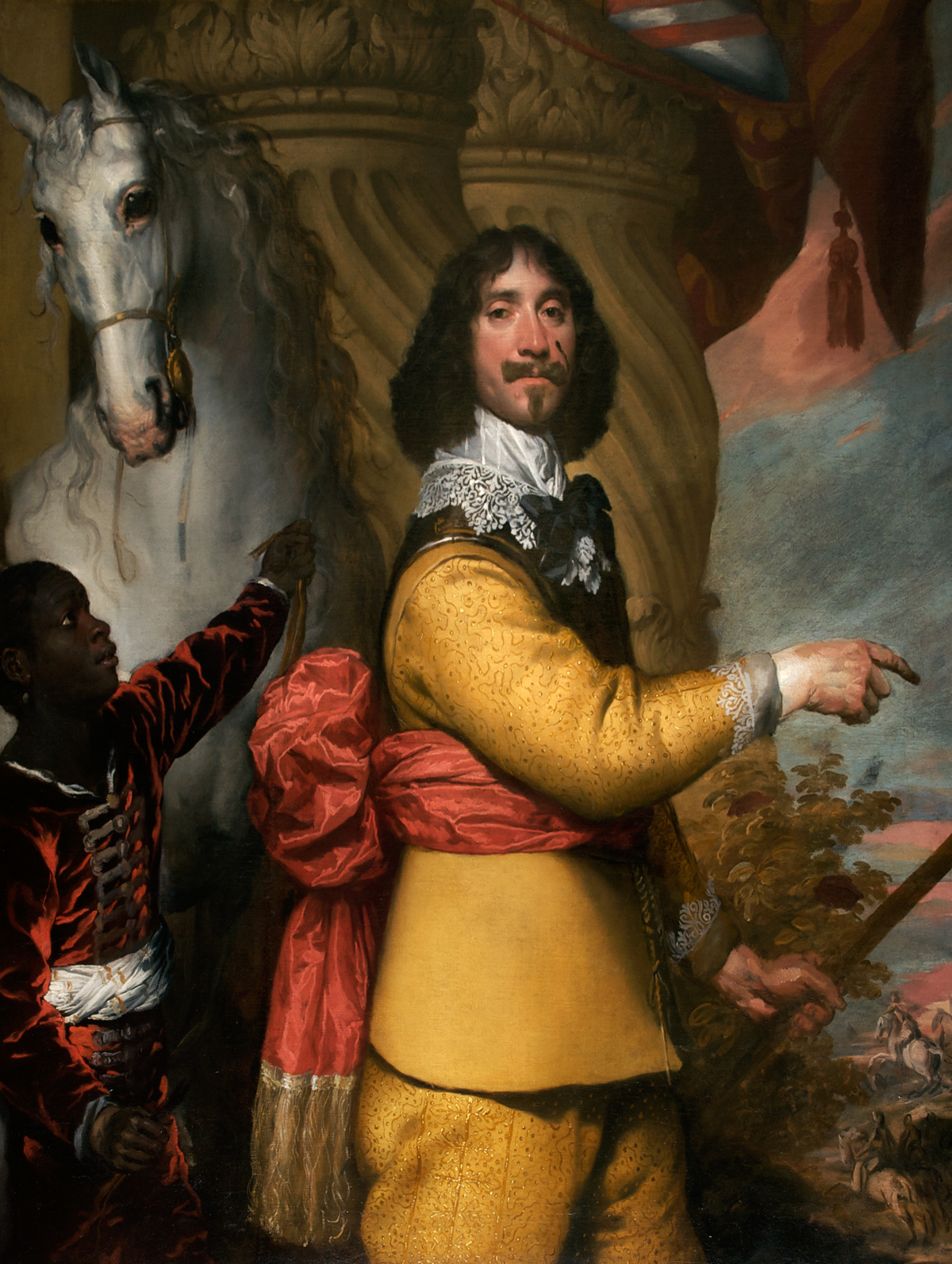
- Portrait of Lord Byron by William Dobson, 1643. The Royalist commander Lord Byron
Date	26 December 1643
Location	Middlewich, England
Result	Royalist victory

Belligerents
Royalists	Parliamentarians

Commanders and leaders
Lord Byron; Richard Gibson	Sir William Brereton; Alexander Rigby

Strength
5,000	3,000

Casualties and losses
Unknown	200 killed

The Second Battle of Middlewich took place on 26 December 1643 near Middlewich in Cheshire during the First English Civil War. A Royalist force under Lord Byron defeated a Parliamentarian army commanded by Sir William Brereton.

== Background ==
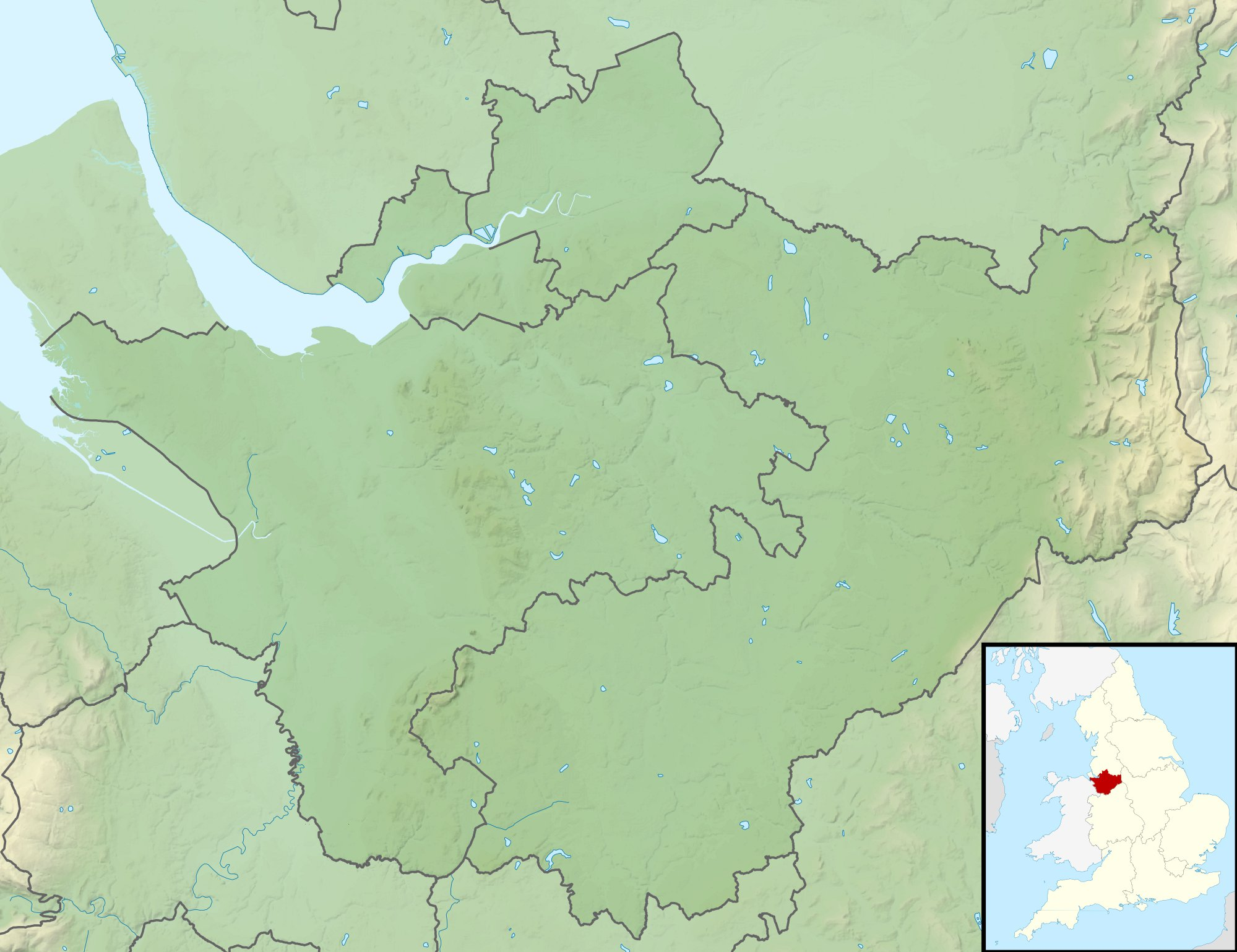
Middlewich campaign 1643

After their victory at the First Battle of Middlewich on 13 March 1643, Parliamentarian forces under Sir William Brereton occupied much of Cheshire. Based at Nantwich, his troops controlled the eastern and central portions of the county, approximately two-thirds of the region, while the Royalists held its western portions, including the Dee Valley and the key port city of Chester, whose possession allowed them to transport troops and supplies from Ireland and their recruiting areas in North Wales.

During the summer of 1643, Brereton began tightening the blockade around Chester, and in late October, his troops temporarily isolated the city by moving into northern Wales. In order to end this, Charles I appointed Lord Byron commander of Royalist forces in Cheshire and Lancashire, while in November he was reinforced by troops transferred from Ireland who had been fighting in the Irish Confederate Wars.

Byron planned to first capture Nantwich, clear the Parliamentarians from Cheshire and then move onto Lancashire. On 12 December, he left Chester with 4,000 foot and 1,000 horse and began a brutal campaign, sweeping aside Parliamentarian forces and capturing numerous strongholds. On 13 December, he captured Beeston Castle and at Barthomley on 23rd, his troops killed 12 civilians including the schoolmaster.

== Battle ==
On 25 December, Byron and his army were camped at Sandbach when Royalist sympathisers informed him that Brereton was deployed around Middlewich, while Brereton's scouts reported a skirmish with Royalist outposts. As a result, both commanders mobilised; Byron readied his troops and prepared to march the seven kilometers to Middlewich and attack on 26 December. Joined by 1,500 men under Colonel Alexander Rigby, Brereton deployed his forces along Booth Lane, placing his infantry in the hedges and the ditches lining the street, cannon in the middle and cavalry on either side.

When battle commenced on 26 December, it initially resulted in an hour of fierce hand-to-hand fighting but despite their numerical superiority the Royalists failed to break the Parliamentarian defences. Byron then ordered his cavalry to attack, supported by his infantry under Colonel Richard Gibson, forcing their opponents to fall back and seek refuge in houses and the church, leaving 200 dead and many wounded. Seeing the battle was lost, Brereton and the rest of his troops retreated northwest to the safety of Manchester.

== Aftermath ==
The local inhabitants were left to attend to the wounded and bury the dead, while the town was damaged and ransacked for food and valuables, which was followed by a second occurrence of the plague. Over the next few weeks, the absence of significant opposition allowed Byron to capture Parliamentarian garrisons at Northwich, Crewe Hall and Doddington Hall, before moving to attack Nantwich on 18 January 1644. However, the town was held by a well-equipped garrison of 1,500 which repulsed the Royalists with considerable loss; by now, Brereton had been reinforced by Parliamentarian troops from Yorkshire under Sir Thomas Fairfax and on 25 January their combined forces defeated Byron outside Nantwich who retreated into Chester where he remained for much of the next two years.

In retrospect, Royalist successes in December 1643, including their victory at Middlewich, were only temporary. Byron's defeat at Nantwich meant Brereton once again controlled most of the county and placed them on the defensive, although Chester did not finally surrender until February 1646.
