= Bunbury Agreement =

1642 proposal to keep Cheshire neutral during the English Civil War

The Bunbury Agreement of 23 December 1642 was a declaration of neutrality drawn up by some prominent gentlemen of the county of Cheshire shortly after the outbreak of the First English Civil War. Like similar attempts in Lancashire and other counties, it was ignored by both Parliament and Charles I, since the strategic importance of Cheshire and the city port of Chester meant national interests overruled local ones.

== History ==
The outbreak of the First English Civil War in August 1642 led to a summer of skirmishes in Cheshire as both sides attempted to gain control of the region. Henry Mainwaring and Mr. Marbury of Marbury Hall for Parliament and Lord Kilmorey and Sir Orlando Bridgeman, son of the Bishop of Chester, for the Royalists agreed to meet on 23 December at Bunbury. They agreed that all fighting in Cheshire would end. All prisoners would be released, property taken during the conflict returned to its owners and any losses compensated by a levy on both sides. Fortifications were to be removed at Chester, Nantwich, Stockport, Knutsford and Northwich and their combined forces would escort any external forces out of the county. Both parties agreed that there were to be no further troop movements through Cheshire, and that they would not to raise any more troops locally. Everything depending on the agreement of their national commanders, whom they would urge to settle their differences peacefully.

Given the national strategic importance of Cheshire, it proved impossible for the local gentry to agree a local neutrality pact that their national commanders would agree to. Geographically Cheshire lies between the Pennines and the north Welsh foothills and so whoever controlled Cheshire controlled the western route to north west England and Scotland as well as an important route into north Wales. For Parliament the control of Cheshire would mean separating the King's northern supporters from the King and his army at Oxford. It could also stop the King bringing in reinforcements from his Irish army through the port of Chester. During the summer the King's supporters had not been idle and Chester's defences had been strengthened with the Commissioners of Array arranging to man the defences. In addition the city's corporation raised an additional 300 men to assist them, that were paid for by a monthly assessment (local tax) on all inhabitants. These preparations continued in December when the corporation raised more money through another assessment for additional weapons and fortifications.

Sir William Brereton and Dunham Massey, the leading Parliamentarians in Cheshire were in London and did not agree with the Agreement. On 9 January 1643 (New Style) Brereton was commissioned by Parliament to take control of the Parliamentary forces in Cheshire and Massey was ordered to take command of the Cheshire Militia. These actions effectively killed the Agreement.

On 19 January, the King announced that he was sending Sir Thomas Aston as a Major-General to Cheshire and Lancashire. Aston's orders were simply stated by Prince Rupert; he was to take his regiment to Shropshire, raise forces of horse and foot there, and then defend Cheshire against the Parliamentary force that was heading to the county from London under the leadership of Sir William Brereton. He was also to seize arms and ammunition for the King's use and "put into execution the laws and customs martial upon all offenders.....for the better preventing of disorders, plunderings and outrages which are often committed by soldiers." He was told to achieve this and return to the main army by 15 March unless he received orders to the contrary. The Cheshire Commissioners of Array were also given explicit orders as to what they should do to help Aston. The King explained to them that as the Parliamentarians had rejected the Bunbury Agreement and were sending a force to Cheshire, he was sending Aston and his regiment of horse to protect the county.

After some skirmishes and maneuvering for position, these two opposing forces would fight a pitched battle, the First Battle of Middlewich, on 13 March 1643.

== See also ==
- Treaty of Neutrality (Yorkshire) signed on 29 September 1642 by Lord Fairfax for Parliament and Henry Bellasis for the Royalists
- Clubmen for attempts by men in other counties to remain neutral during the war.

== Sources ==
- Why did people want the king back in 1646? Case study 1: Effects of war, 1642-45 - Source 3: Bunbury Agreement
- Peace of Bunbury
- Early modern Chester 1550-1762: The civil war and interregnum, 1642-60', A History of the County of Chester: Volume 5 (i): The City of Chester: General History and Topography (2003), pp. 115-25 on website of British History Online
- Wheeler, Hadyn (2021). Clubmen 1645; Neutralism in a revolution. Minster Press. ISBN 978-1899499946.
