= Treaty of Neutrality (Yorkshire) =

1642 proposal to keep Yorkshire neutral during the English Civil War

The Treaty of Neutrality signed on 29 September 1642 by Lord Fairfax for Parliament and Henry Bellasis for the Royalists, the two Knights of the Shire who represented Yorkshire in Parliament, with the support and agreement of other gentlemen of the county, in the hope of avoiding civil war in Yorkshire. The treaty was disowned by Parliament on 4 October 1642.

== See also ==
- English Civil War timeline.
- 3 June meeting on Heworth Moor, Charles summoned the lords and gentry of Yorkshire to Heworth Moor to garner support from the county in his struggle with Parliament. At the meeting, at the request of Parliament, Lord Fairfax petitioned Charles to listen to Parliament and to discontinue the raising of troops.
- 23 December, Bunbury Agreement designed to keep Cheshire neutral during the Civil War.
- 28 January 1643, the Long Parliament sent commissioners to negotiate the Treaty of Oxford (unsuccessful).
