= Meeting on Heworth Moor =

The great meeting on Heworth Moor outside York took place on 3 June 1642. Hopper (2007:1-4) ("'Black Tom': Sir Thomas Fairfax and the English Revolution") provides a vivid account of the meeting and its important role in the period leading up to the civil war. The lords and gentry of Yorkshire were summoned there by King Charles I to garner support from the county in his struggle with Parliament. At the meeting, at the request of Parliament, Lord Fairfax petitioned Charles to listen to Parliament and to discontinue the raising of troops.

== Prelude ==
During the summer of 1642 both the Parliamentary party and King Charles I negotiated with each other while preparing for war.

Previously to the commencement of the English Civil War, the king, to avoid the importunity of the Parliament, who petitioned for the exclusive control of the militia, and for other privileges subversive of the royal authority, moved from London to York, and was received by the inhabitants of York with every demonstration of loyalty and affection. He sent a message to both houses of Parliament, and afterwards advanced to Hull, to secure the arsenal there which had been left in that town, upon the disbanding of the army raised to oppose the Scots in the Bishops War; but, on being denied admission by Sir John Hotham, the parliamentary governor, he returned to York. Parliament soon after appointed a commission to reside in York, to strengthen their party, and to watch the movements of the king. On their passing an ordinance for embodying the militia, the king ordered his friends to meet him in York, whither he directed the several courts to be in future adjourned. The Lord-Keeper Lyttelton, being ordered by Parliament not to issue the writs, apparently obeyed; but on the first opportunity made his escape to York, and brought with him the Great Seal, joined the royal party, for which he was afterwards proclaimed by Parliament a traitor and a felon.

== Meeting ==
On 27 May 1642, the king issued a proclamation from his court at York, appointing a public meeting of the nobility and gentry of the neighbourhood to be held at Heworth Moor, on 3 June. This meeting was attended by more than seventy thousand persons, who, as Charles approached, accompanied by his son, Prince Charles, and one hundred and fifty knights in complete armour, and attended with a guard of eight hundred infantry, greeted him with the loudest acclamations of loyalty and respect. The king, in a short address, explained the particulars of the situation in which he was placed, and thanking them for their assurances of loyalty and attachment.

However, not all those who attended were sympathetic to the King's cause. Lord Fairfax was required by Parliament to present a petition to his sovereign, entreating Charles to hearken to the voice of his Parliament, and to discontinue the raising of troops. This was at a great meeting of the freeholders and farmers of Yorkshire convened by the king on Heworth Moor on 3 June near York. Charles evaded receiving the petition, pressing his horse forward, but Thomas Fairfax followed him and placed the petition on the pommel of the king's saddle.

== Aftermath ==
It became clear after the meeting on Heworth Moor that opinion in the county of Yorkshire was divided, so a local peace treaty was negotiated for the county of Yorkshire, known as the Treaty of Neutrality, it was signed by Lord Fairfax for Parliament and Henry Belasyse for the Royalists, on 29 September 1642, but was within days repudiated by Parliament in London and both in Yorkshire duly took up arms.

Charles returned from the meeting to York, where, after keeping his court for more than five months, during which time every attempt at negotiation had failed, he advanced to Nottingham, and there erected his standard on 22 August 1642. From there by an indirect route his army advanced on London, to be met by a Parliamentary army at the Battle of Edgehill on 23 October 1642, the first pitched battle of the First English Civil War.
