= Brereton baronets =

Extinct baronetcy in the Baronetage of England

Brereton baronets, of Hanford
- Arms: Argent two Bars Sable, over all a Cross-formée fleury Gules. Crests: 1st, Out of a Ducal Coronet Or, a Bear’s Head proper, charged with a Crescent in chief and a Cross-Crosslet in base for difference. 2nd, Upon a Chapeau Gules, turned up Ermine, a Griffin wings elevated Gules,

The Brereton Baronetcy, of Hanford in the County of Chester, was a title in the Baronetage of England. It was created on 10 March 1627 for William Brereton, Member of Parliament for Cheshire. The title became extinct on the death of the second Baronet in 1674.

== Brereton baronets, of Hanford (1627) ==
- Sir William Brereton, 1st Baronet (1604–1661)
- Sir Thomas Brereton, 2nd Baronet (1632–1674)
