= George Moxon =

George Moxon (1602–1687) was an English clergyman who fled England to settle in Dorchester, Massachusetts.

Moxon was born in Yorkshire, England, one of seven sons. He attended Wakefield Grammar School, then in 1623 he graduated from Sidney Sussex College, Cambridge, with a BA in Theology. He was ordained in 1626 by John Bridgeman, the Bishop of Chester.

His first position was as Chaplain to Sir William Brereton of Handforth Hall.

He travelled to New England in 1637. He served as pastor of the congregational church at Springfield, Massachusetts.

Following the public burning of William Pynchon's book The Meritorious Price of Our Redemption, Moxon and his family returned to England in 1653.

Upon his return, he lived for a time in Newbold Astbury, in Cheshire, and established a congregational church in Rushton Spencer, Staffordshire. He was forced from his curacy during the Great Ejection following the Act of Uniformity 1662.

== Family ==
He married a daughter of Isaac Ambrose; they had at least one son, George junior, who was also a preacher.
