= Declaration of Indulgence (1672) =

Decree by King Charles II of England granting liberty to all Christians

The Declaration of Indulgence was Charles II of England's attempt to extend religious liberty to Protestant nonconformists and Catholics in his realms, by suspending the execution of the Penal Laws that punished recusants from the Church of England. Charles issued the Declaration on 15 March 1672.

It was highly controversial and Sir Orlando Bridgeman, son of a bishop, resigned as Lord Keeper of the Great Seal, because he refused to apply the Great Seal to it, regarding it as too generous to Catholics.

In 1673 the Cavalier Parliament compelled Charles to withdraw the declaration and implement, in its place, the first of the Test Acts (1673), which required anyone entering public service in England to deny the Catholic doctrine of transubstantiation and to take Anglican communion. When Charles II's openly Catholic successor James II attempted to issue a similar Declaration of Indulgence, an order for general religious tolerance, it became one of the grievances that led to the Glorious Revolution which ousted him from the throne.

== See also ==
- Declaration of Indulgence (1687)
- Religion in the United Kingdom
