= Robert Ellice (Royalist) =

Welsh soldier

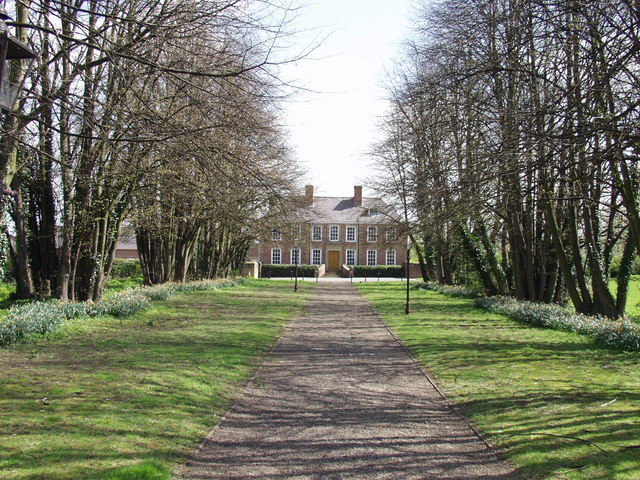
- Croesnewydd, formerly Gwasnewydd, Wrexham, inherited by Ellice from his uncle
- Born: c. 1610; Denbighshire
- Died: bef. 1661
- Spouse: Mary Lloyd
- Children: Peter Ellice (d.1719), several daughters
- Relatives: Thomas Ellice (brother)
- Military career
- Allegiance: (yes) Swedish Empire; Royalists
- Branch: Infantry
- Service years: 1642–1646
- Rank: Colonel of Foot
- Commands: Robert Ellice's Regiment
- Conflicts: Thirty Years' War; First English Civil War; First Battle of Middlewich; Battle of Marston Moor; Siege of Oxford

Colonel Robert Ellice of Gwasnewydd (fl. 1640; occasionally spelt "Robert Ellis") was a Welsh professional soldier who served in the Royalist army in the English Civil War.

Trained as a military engineer, during the war Ellice served largely in North Wales, which was strategically important due to ports giving access to Ireland. He was responsible for constructing much of the outer fortifications of Chester, but also served as a colonel of foot in engagements across the region.

== Life ==
Ellice was born in Denbighshire to a minor gentry family, the son of Gruffydd Ellis ap Risiard of Bersham: the family claimed descent from mediaeval Welsh nobility through an illegitimate line. They were connected with several other landowning families locally, including the Lloyds of Bodidris.

Ellice married Mary Lloyd, the daughter of the vicar of Ruabon. They had one son, Peter Ellice, who was born in about 1647 and became a barrister, and at least two daughters. From his uncle, the lawyer and antiquary Peter Ellice, Robert inherited the house and estate of Gwasnewydd near Wrexham, later rebuilt by his son and renamed Croesnewydd. Robert also had a younger brother, Thomas, who became a Commissioner for Barbados.

Much information about Ellice's background is unrecorded, including his birth date. He is known to have trained as a military engineer while serving under Gustavus Adolphus in the Thirty Years' War; this experience meant that during the Civil War he was "highly trusted" by the Royalist leadership. Canon David Lloyd, a contemporary, described Ellice as a "vigilant, sober, active and valiant commander".

== Civil War service ==
In January 1643 Ellice was ordered to seize and garrison Chirk Castle, the home of the Denbighshire Member of Parliament Thomas Myddelton. Myddelton being absent sitting in the Long Parliament, Ellice took Chirk with minimal resistance, taking the estate steward Watkin Kyffin prisoner. On Charles I's orders Ellice also requisitioned Myddelton's plate and money; this was used to fund the establishment of Ellice's regiment of foot.

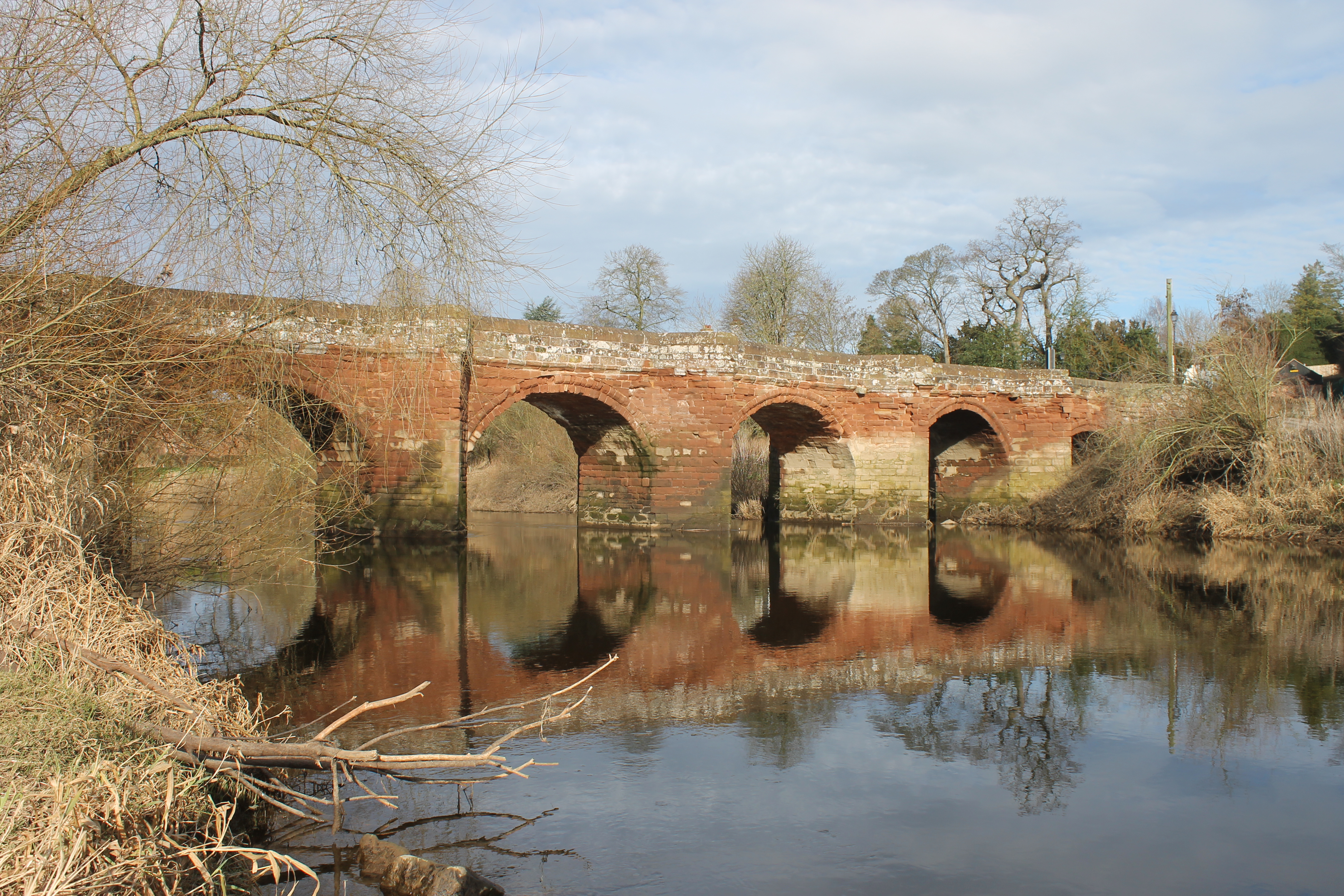
The bridge over the River Dee between Holt and Farndon; Ellice's regiment were defeated here in a skirmish on 9th November 1643 by Sir William Brereton.

Leaving Chirk garrisoned by Sir Thomas Hanmer, Ellice helped organise the defences of the strategic port of Chester. On 15 March Ellice and his regiment took part in a night attack on Middlewich under Aston. Initially successful, most of the infantry was trapped in Middlewich church when the Parliamentarian commander William Brereton counter-attacked; Ellice and a number of other officers were taken prisoner. He was eventually exchanged in September 1643.

On his release Ellice was made commander-in-chief of Denbighshire and Flintshire under Lord Capell and authorised to raise a new regiment of 1,200 men. Parliament was preparing to mount an offensive into north-east Wales and the regiment was deployed at Holt Bridge in November to guard it against an expected attack by Brereton; on 9 November Brereton's men stormed the bridge gatehouse and entered Holt, scattering Ellice's raw recruits.

In the following months Ellice reformed his regiment, operating mainly in Shropshire. On Sunday 24 March 1644, in cooperation with the cavalry officer Sir William Vaughan, he defeated a Parliamentarian garrison at Apley. A Royalist newspaper claimed that Ellice "plyed the Rebells so close with shot of all sorts, that in two Howres they took the House": the Parliamentarian news-sheet Mercurius Britannicus commented that "The truth is, Ellis had rather be doing anything on a Sunday than serving God".

Later the same month Ellice and Vaughan defeated Thomas Mytton in a skirmish at Longford near Lilleshall, taking 200 prisoners. In May his regiment accompanied Prince Rupert into northern England, taking part in the storming of Bolton on 28 May, and probably fighting in the Royalist defeat at Marston Moor.

While most of Ellice's regiment were taken prisoner at Montgomery in September 1644, Ellice himself seems to have spent much of 1645 in North Wales, at Conwy, as the area controlled by the Royalists gradually shrank. He was mentioned by Archbishop Williams of York, a native of Conwy, as "but a weak piece, a potter [...] not to be relied upon" and as unable to stand up to the town's military governor, Sir John Owen of Clenennau. He was in the besieged Royalist capital Oxford at the time of its surrender in June 1646, as his name appears on the surrender articles.

== After the war ==
Ellice returned home after the war ended: like many other Royalist officers he was fined, though the relatively small sum of £200, reduced on appeal to £150 shows he was not a wealthy man. He appears to have followed the terms of his surrender and did not take part in any further Royalist rebellions. Ellice died around the time of the Restoration, though the exact date of his death is unknown.

== Sources ==
- Barratt, John (2000). Cavaliers: The Royalist Army at War, 1642-1646. Sutton.
- Dodd, A. H. (1959). "ELLICE, ROBERT (ELLIS,)(fl.1640), Royalist soldier". Dictionary of Welsh Biography. National Library of Wales.
- Myddleton, William (1931). Chirk Castle Accounts, 1666-1753. Manchester University Press.
- Tucker, Norman (1964). Denbighshire Officers in the Civil War. Gee & Son.
