= Sir Orlando Bridgeman, 1st Baronet, of Great Lever =

English lawyer and politician (1606–1674)

The Right Honourable Sir Orlando Bridgeman Bt SL PC
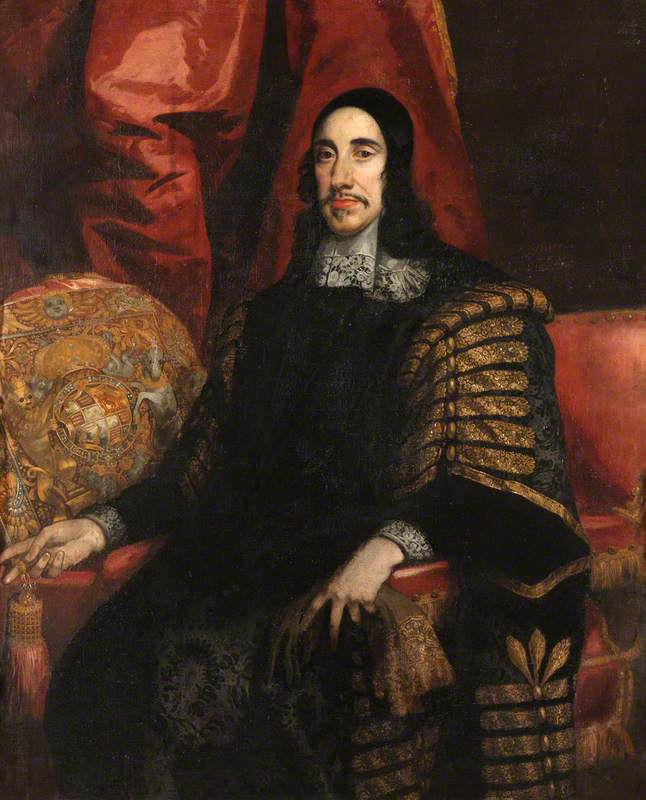
- Portrait by Pieter Borsseler

Lord Keeper of the Great Seal
- In office 31 August 1667 – 17 November 1672
- Preceded by: Edward Hyde, 1st Earl of Clarendon (Lord Chancellor)
- Succeeded by: Anthony Ashley Cooper, 1st Earl of Shaftesbury (Lord Chancellor)

Chief Justice of the Common Pleas
- In office 22 October 1660 – May 1668
- Preceded by: Oliver St John
- Succeeded by: John Vaughan

Personal details
- Born: 30 January 1606
- Died: 25 June 1674 (aged 68)
- Occupation: English politician

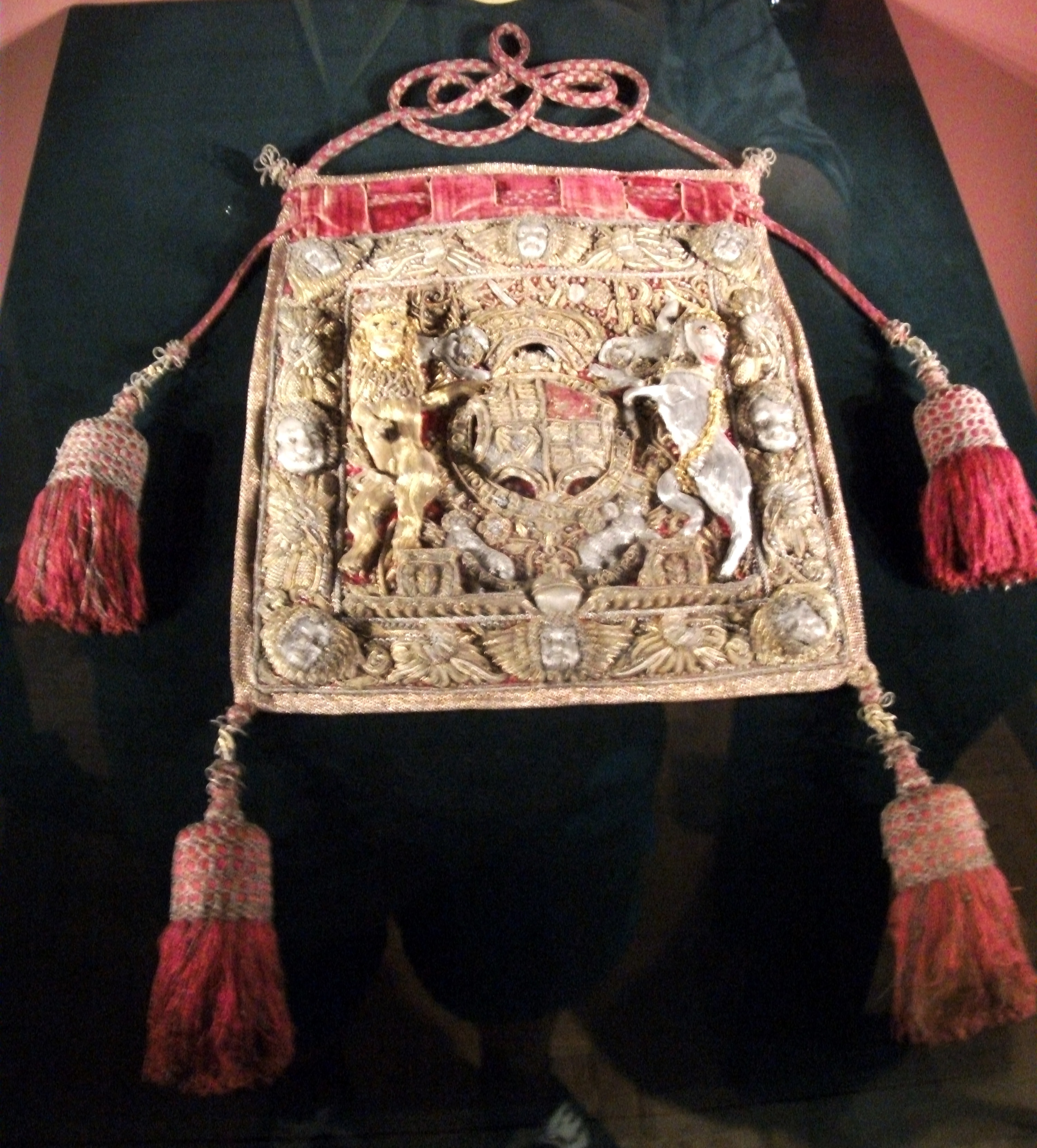
Ceremonial purse at Weston Park, used by Sir Orlando as Lord Keeper of the Great Seal, 1667–1672, and shown in his portrait above

Sir Orlando Bridgeman, 1st Baronet (30 January 1606 – 25 June 1674) was an English common law jurist, lawyer, and politician who sat in the House of Commons from 1640 to 1642. He supported the Royalist cause in the Civil War.

== Early life and education ==
Bridgeman was the son of John Bridgeman, Bishop of Chester, and his wife Elizabeth Helyar, daughter of Reverend William Helyar. He was educated at Queens' College, Cambridge and graduated with a Bachelor of Arts in 1624. The same year, Bridgeman became a fellow at Magdalene College, Cambridge and was called to the Bar at the Inner Temple.

== Career ==
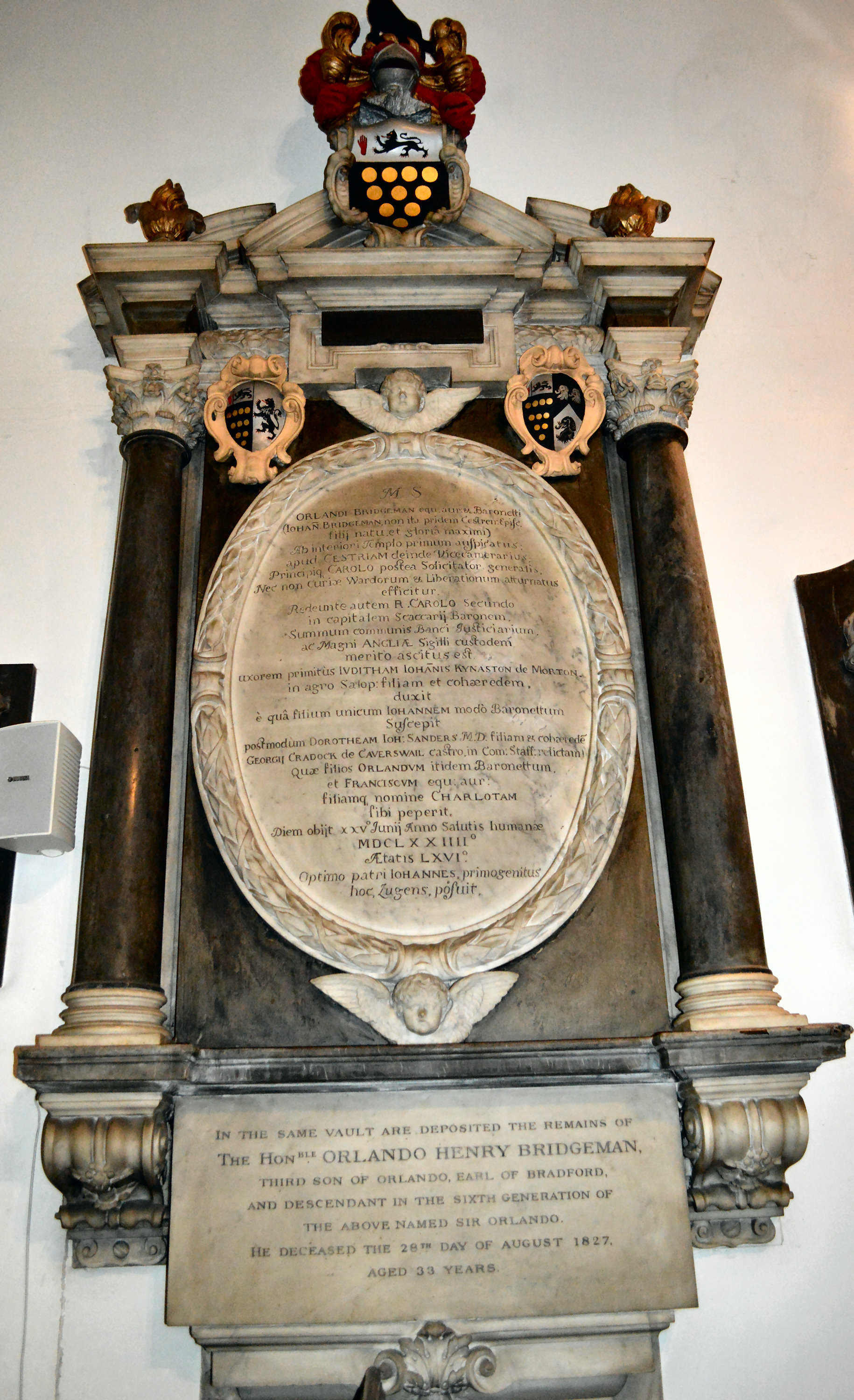
Monument in St Mary's church, Teddington

Bridgeman worked as a barrister until 1632, and was named vice chamberlain of Chester in 1638. In 1640, he was appointed Attorney of the Court of Wards in 1640, and Solicitor-General to Charles, the Prince of Wales.

In April 1640, Bridgeman was elected Member of Parliament for Wigan in the Short Parliament. He was re-elected MP for Wigan for the Long Parliament in November 1640. He rallied to the royal cause and in 1642 assisted Lord Strange at Chester against the parliamentary forces. As a result, he was disabled from sitting in parliament on 29 August 1642.

He was knighted by the King, Charles I, in 1643.

From 1644 to 1646, Bridgeman was Custos Rotulorum of Cheshire. In 1645, he was Commissioner at the Treaty of Uxbridge on behalf of the King. He compounded for his delinquency in 1646. On 30 May 1660, Bridgeman was made Serjeant-at-Law, and two days later Lord Chief Baron of the Exchequer. The following week, on 7 June 1660, he was created a Baronet, of Great Lever, in the County of Lancaster.

From 1660 to 1668, Bridgeman was Chief Justice of the Court of Common Pleas, and in August 1667 he was appointed Lord Keeper of the Great Seal in place of Edward Hyde, 1st Earl of Clarendon. Unlike Clarendon, Bridgeman was not made Lord Chancellor (a role which had previously been tied to that of Lord Keeper) and did not hold significant power within the Cabal ministry which held power throughout Bridgeman's tenure. He resigned this post in 1672 because he refused to apply the Great Seal to the Royal Declaration of Indulgence, which he regarded as too generous to Catholics.

In 1668, he was a member of the New England Company. In his final years, Bridgeman appointed the priest, theologian, and metaphysical poet Thomas Traherne (c. 1637 – 1674) as his private chaplain at Teddington and supported the publication of his writings. Bridgeman died aged 65 in Teddington, Middlesex and was buried there.

Bridgeman was highly regarded in his time for his participation in the trial of the regicides of King Charles I in 1660, and also for devising complex legal instruments for the conveyance of estates in land. Among Bridgeman's most enduring inventions was a device for the 22nd Earl of Arundel, which led to the creation in the Duke of Norfolk's Case, 3 Ch. Ca. 1, 22. Eng. Rep. 931 (Ch. 1681), of the Rule Against Perpetuities. Following the Great Fire of London he was one of the judges appointed to resolve disputes about property arising from the fire.

== Family ==
Bridgeman married twice, firstly Judith Kynaston, daughter of John Kynaston, on 30 January 1627 or 1628. They had two children:

- Mary Bridgeman, married, firstly Sir Edward Morgan, married secondly Richard Hanbury
- Sir John Bridgeman, 2nd Baronet (1631–1710)

Secondly he married Dorothy Saunders, daughter of John Saunders. They had three children:

- Sir Francis Bridgeman, married Susan Barker, daughter of Sir Richard Barker
- Sir Orlando Bridgeman, 1st Baronet, of Ridley (died 1701)
- Charlotte Bridgeman (died 1694), married Sir Thomas Myddelton, 2nd Baronet, in 1677

== See also ==
- Bunbury Agreement

Parliament of England
Vacant Parliament suspended Title last held by Edward Bridgeman	Member of Parliament for Wigan; 1640–1642; With: Alexander Rigby	Succeeded by Alexander Rigby
Political offices
Preceded by Sir George Booth	Custos Rotulorum of Cheshire; 1644–1646	Vacant English Interregnum Title next held by The Lord Delamer
Preceded by The Earl of Clarendon	Lord Keeper of the Great Seal; 1667–1672	Succeeded by The Earl of Shaftesbury
Legal offices
Preceded by John Wilde	Lord Chief Baron of the Exchequer; 1660	Succeeded by Matthew Hale
Preceded by Oliver St John	Chief Justice of the Common Pleas; 1660–1667	Succeeded by Sir John Vaughan
Baronetage of England
New creation	Baronet of Great Lever; 1660–1674	Succeeded by John Bridgeman
