= Battle of Nantwich =

Part of the First English Civil War (1644)

Coordinates: 53.08096°N 2.54445°W

- Part of First English Civil War
Date	25 January 1644
Location	Nantwich, Cheshire
Result	Parliamentarian victory

Belligerents
Royalists	Parliamentarians

Commanders and leaders
Lord Byron; Richard Gibson	Sir Thomas Fairfax; Sir William Brereton; Sir George Booth

Strength
1,800 horse c. 2,000 foot	1,800 horse 500 dragoons 2,500+ foot

Casualties and losses
1,500 prisoners	Unknown

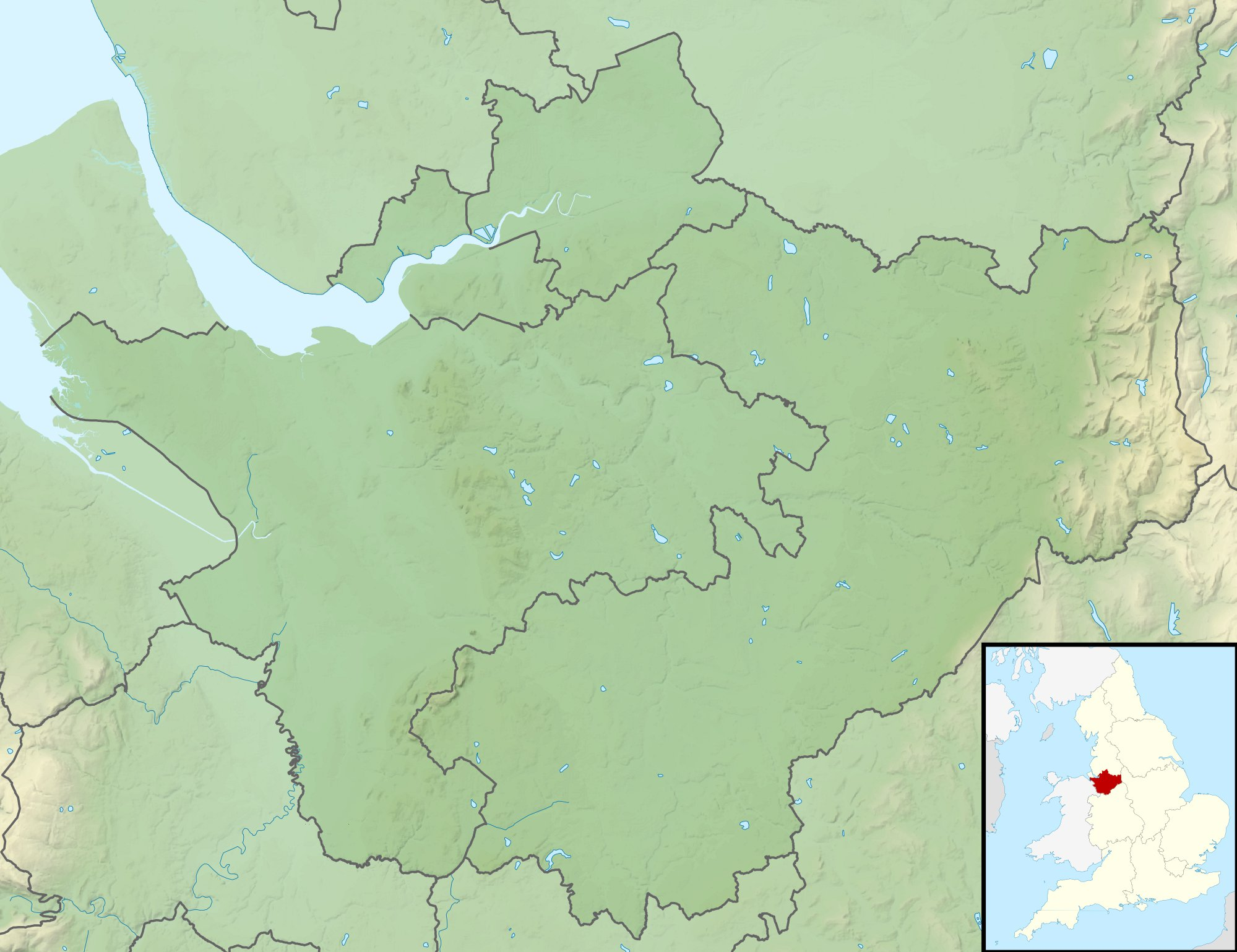
Cheshire County and Nantwich

The Battle of Nantwich was fought on 25 January 1644 in Cheshire during the First English Civil War. In the battle, Sir Thomas Fairfax in command of a Parliamentarian relief force defeated Lord Byron and the Royalists.

The Parliamentarian victory halted a series of Royalist successes in the area and was a major setback to King Charles' planned military campaign for 1644.

== Campaign ==
In 1643, King Charles had signed a "cessation" with the Irish Confederates. This allowed him to recall several English regiments which had been sent to Ireland after the Irish Rebellion of 1641, to reinforce his armies. In November 1643, several of these regiments were sent to Cheshire where a new field army was being formed, commanded at first by Lord Capell. Capell was replaced in December by Lord Byron, who had been a successful cavalry brigade commander in the King's main "Oxford Army".

Byron launched an offensive from the south with 5,000 men against the Parliamentarian garrisons in Cheshire, most of which were quickly captured. The troops recently returned from Ireland behaved with a degree of ruthlessness not previously displayed in the English Civil War. At Barthomley Church on 26 December, the Parliamentarian garrison surrendered after the Royalists lit a fire against the doors to smoke them out. At least twelve of the prisoners, mostly local militia, were executed with Byron's approval.

On 27 December, Sir William Brereton, the Parliamentarian commander in Cheshire and Lancashire, attempted to concentrate his forces to confront Byron, but was defeated by a sudden Royalist attack at the Second Battle of Middlewich. He retreated with the remnants of his force to Manchester in Lancashire.

Nantwich was the only town in Cheshire still held by the Parliamentarians. Its garrison numbered 2,000 men under Colonel George Booth and was well supplied. Byron besieged the town on 18 January 1644 and launched an attack but was defeated, suffering 500 casualties. Together with losses from sickness and desertions and casualties from the earlier fighting in Cheshire, Byron's forces shrunk to a total size of about 3,800 men. Byron nevertheless continued the siege of Nantwich.

== Parliamentarian moves ==
Sir Thomas Fairfax and his father Lord Fairfax had been besieged in Hull in the second half of 1643. As Thomas's cavalry were of little use in a siege, they were ferried across the River Humber to reinforce Parliamentarian cavalry from the Eastern Association of counties, commanded by Oliver Cromwell. Together, they had won several victories, culminating in the Battle of Winceby, which secured most of Lincolnshire for Parliament.

In response to Brereton's urgent appeal for reinforcements, the Committee of Both Kingdoms (the Parliamentarian body with Scottish Covenanter representation which was responsible for the conduct of the war) ordered Thomas Fairfax to proceed to Manchester. On 29 December 1643, Thomas set out to cross the Pennines in harsh winter weather with 1,800 cavalry. On arriving at Manchester, he found the infantry of the Parliamentarian garrison to be so ragged that he reportedly burst into tears. Nevertheless, Fairfax set out from Manchester on 21 January 1644 to relieve Nantwich. He was accompanied by Brereton, and their force eventually numbered 1,800 cavalry, 500 dragoons, 2,500 infantry and a few hundred poorly-equipped "cudgellers".

== Battle ==
At the time, Nantwich was an important town, significant for its salt production and tanning industry. Despite the fact that Queen Elizabeth I had supported a successful country-wide appeal to help fund the rebuilding of the town after a disastrous fire, which had destroyed most of the town 80 years previously, Nantwich was a Parliamentarian stronghold.

The town lay astride the River Weaver, which was normally a stream 20 feet (6.1 m) wide. The Parliamentarians held the Chester Road Bridge in the town, but the Beam Bridge about 0.5 miles (0.8 km) to the north was open and available to the Royalists. Byron's headquarters were at Acton, about 1 mile (1.6 km) to the west of Nantwich. His regiments were quartered in a circle around the town sheltering where they could in a countryside covered in snow.

On 24 January, Fairfax's force scattered a small Royalist force which attempted to bar the road to Nantwich at Delamere Forest. Byron decided to maintain the siege, but the next day there was a sudden thaw which caused the Weaver to rise in spate. Byron ordered his infantry and artillery to move to the west bank of the Weaver around Acton, where the ground was drier. The Beam Bridge and a ferry to its north, however, were then swept away by the floodwater while Byron and his cavalry force of 1,800 were still on the east bank. He was forced to march 6 miles (9.7 km) by means of another bridge at Minshull Vernon to support his infantry at Acton.

As Fairfax approached Acton, Colonel Richard Gibson (deputising for Byron's Sergeant-Major General, Sir Michael Erneley, who was ill) deployed four regiments of infantry (his own and those of Sir Michael Erneley, Colonel Henry Warren and Sir Robert Byron, younger brother of Lord Byron) to face Fairfax. Erneley's, Warren's and Gibson's regiments had recently returned from Ireland. Most of the Royalist artillery was amassed in Acton churchyard, on the left of Gibson's line. Sir Fulk Hunke's locally raised infantry regiment protected the rear against Booth's garrison in Nantwich.

Despite the heavy rain and the numerous ditches and hedges which broke up the ground in front of Gibson's position, Fairfax's force attacked at about 14:00. Fairfax was informed that Byron was approaching his left rear from the direction of Minshull Vernon, but he deployed only two regiments of infantry and his own troop of cavalry to face them, while his main body pushed forward against Gibson. Although Gibson's men repulsed the first Parliamentarian attack, the Parliamentarian cavalry commanded by Thomas Fairfax's cousin, William Fairfax, outflanked the Royalist right wing and forced it to retreat. In the Royalist centre, Warren's "Irish" regiment broke, and Erneley's own regiment retreated. Behind Gibson's position, Booth led a sortie from Nantwich with 600 musketeers which overcame Hunke's regiment and reached Acton churchyard, overrunning the Royalist artillery and wagon park.

By 16:30, only Gibson's and Byron's regiments were still fighting on the flanks of Gibson's position. As the Parliamentarians broke through the Royalist centre, these two regiments were overwhelmed. Many Royalist soldiers defected to the Parliamentarians, the remainder surrendered or fled. About 1,500 were taken prisoner. Many of the officers took refuge in Acton Church, and were also taken prisoner after surrendering on terms. Byron retreated to Chester with the Royalist cavalry, which had been unable to break through Fairfax's flanking detachment.

== Aftermath ==
The defeat at Nantwich thwarted King Charles's plan to create a field army in the northwest based on regiments returned from Ireland. The Parliamentarians mistakenly thought that the "Irish" regiments were Catholics, whom they loathed, and also feared their professionalism, but in fact the Royalist general Sir Ralph Hopton wrote of some "Irish" units which joined his army in the South of England at about the same time:

... bold, hardy men, and excellently well officer'd, but the common-men verie mutenous and shrewdly infected with the rebellious humour of England being brought over meerly by the vertue and loyalty of theire officers and large promesses, which there was then but smale meanes to performe.

One Royalist officer taken prisoner at Nantwich was Colonel George Monck (in command of Michael Warren's regiment), who later changed sides and was to play a prominent part in the Commonwealth of England and the Restoration.

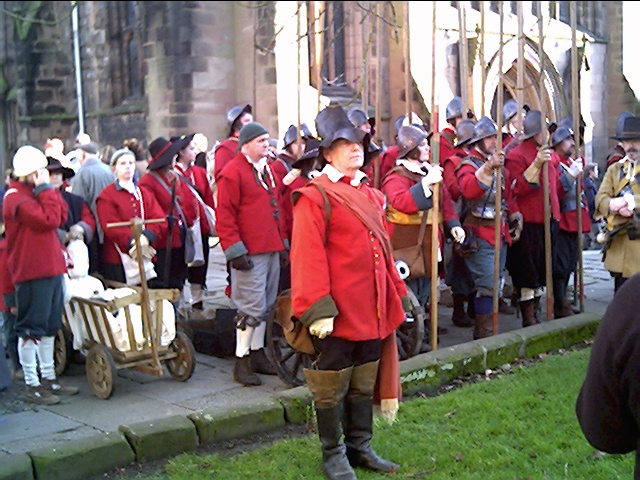
Members of The Sealed Knot parade outside St Mary's parish church, Nantwich for the 2006 Holly Holy Day

== Re-enactments ==
There is an annual re-enactment of the battle by The Sealed Knot on the nearest Saturday to 25 January, with a parade through the town. The parade ends at Dorfold Hall, just outside the limits of the town and on the road to Acton. The commemorative day of the battle is celebrated by the local people as "Holly Holy Day".
