= Alexander Rigby =

English lawyer and politician

Alexander Rigby (1594 – 18 August 1650) was an English lawyer and politician who sat in the House of Commons between 1640 and 1650. He was a colonel in the Parliamentary army in the English Civil War.

== Life ==
Rigby was the son of Alexander Rigby and his wife Ann Asshaw of Wigan and was baptised on 9 July 1594 in Flixton, a village that was historically within the boundaries of Lancashire. He was a member of the Puritan branch of the Rigby family seated at Middleton in Goosnargh near Preston. He was admitted to Gray's Inn in 1610 and became a lawyer.

In April 1640, Rigby was elected Member of Parliament for Wigan in the Short Parliament. He was re-elected MP for Wigan in November 1640 for the Long Parliament and sat until his death in 1650. He was Deputy Lieutenant for Lancashire in 1641 and became a colonel in the Parliamentary army in 1643. Also in 1643 he purchased the Plough Patent for land in Lygonia, Maine between Cape Porpoise and Kennebec River, which includes the area occupied by today's town of Portland.

Rigby was chief commander of forces in Lancashire and at the beginning of 1644, led the attack on Lathom House defended by Charlotte Stanley, Countess of Derby in the Siege of Lathom House. After withdrawing his forces from Lathom, he was caught in the Bolton Massacre when the parliamentarians were surprised in an attack by Prince Rupert. He took his surviving forces to meet the main parliamentarian army at York, and led a regiment at the Battle of Marston Moor on 2 July 1644.

In 1649 Rigby was nominated one of judges in the trial of the King, but declined to act. He was appointed Serjeant-at-law to the Commonwealth in May 1649 and became a Baron of the Exchequer on 1 June 1649.

Rigby contracted an infection at Croydon while on circuit and died at the age of 56.

Rigby married Lucy Legh of Manchester and was succeeded by his son Alexander.

Parliament of England
Vacant Parliament suspended since 1629	Member of Parliament for Wigan; 1640–1650; With: Sir Orlando Bridgeman, 1st Baronet 1640–1642; John Holcroft	Not represented in the Barebones Parliament
