= Sir William Brereton, 1st Baronet =

English religious Independent, author, MP and landowner (1604–1661)

Sir William Brereton MP, JP
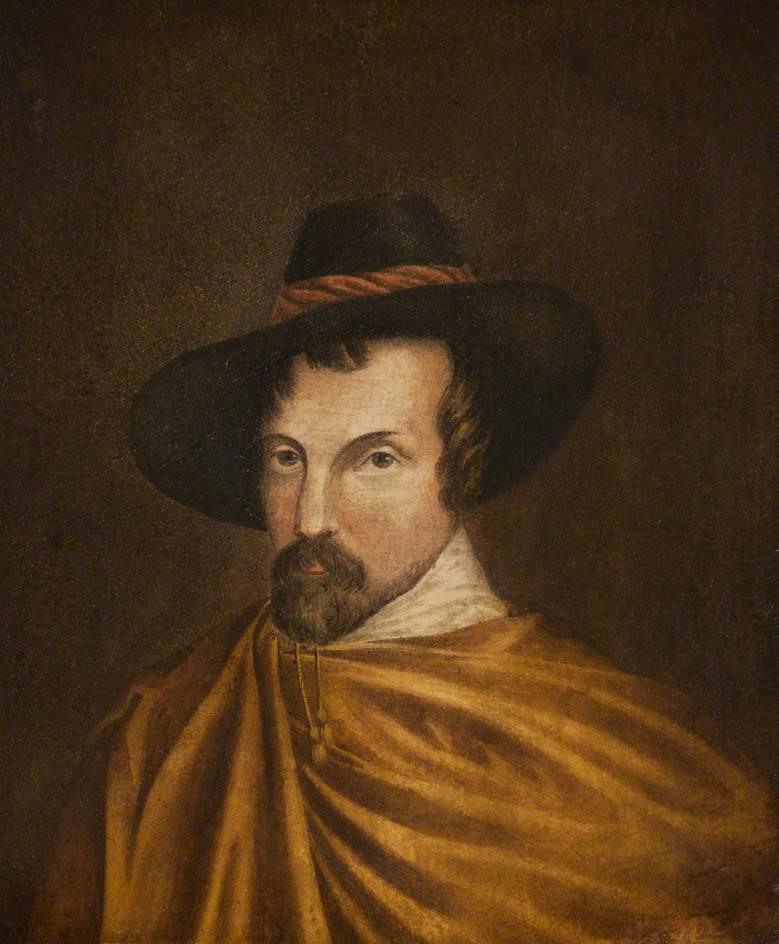
- Sir William Brereton, 1st Baronet

Member of Parliament for Cheshire 1628
- In office November 1640 – April 1653

English Council of State
- In office December 1652 – February 1653

Personal details
- Born: 13 September 1604 Handforth
- Died: 7 April 1661 (aged 56) Croydon Palace
- Resting place: St John Baptist Churchyard, Croydon Minster
- Spouse(s): Susanna Booth (1623–1637); Cicely Mytton (1641–1649)
- Relations: William, Baron Brereton (1611–1664)
- Children: One son, three daughters
- Parent(s): William Brereton (1584–1610); Margaret Holland (1585–1609)
- Education: Brasenose College, Oxford
- Occupation: Landowner and soldier

Military service
- Allegiance: England
- Years of service: 1643 to 1646
- Rank: Major-General
- Commands: Commander, Parliamentarian forces Cheshire
- Battles/wars: First English Civil War; First Middlewich; Hopton Heath; Second Middlewich; Nantwich; Malpas; Chester; Stow-on-the-Wold; Third siege of Lichfield

Sir William Brereton, 1st Baronet (13 September 1604 – 7 April 1661), was an English religious Independent, author, and landowner from Cheshire. He was Member of Parliament for Cheshire at various times between 1628 and 1653, and during the First English Civil War, commander of Parliamentarian forces in the North Midlands.

In the 1630s, he travelled extensively through France, the Dutch Republic, Scotland, and Ireland; his travel journals from 1634 and 1635 were published in the 19th century. His records and letters from the Civil War are a primary source for Parliamentary local administration in the period, as well as the internal divisions that led to the Second English Civil War.

Despite a lack of prior military experience, he proved an energetic and capable soldier, and was one of the most powerful men in England when the First Civil War ended in 1646. However, he gave up his local offices, and although nominated as a judge, refused to attend the trial of Charles I in January 1649. He was elected to the English Council of State in 1652 and 1653 but rarely attended, living in semi-retirement in London. He resumed his seat for Cheshire when the Long Parliament was reinstated in 1659, until its dissolution in March 1660, and died on 7 April 1661.

== Personal details ==
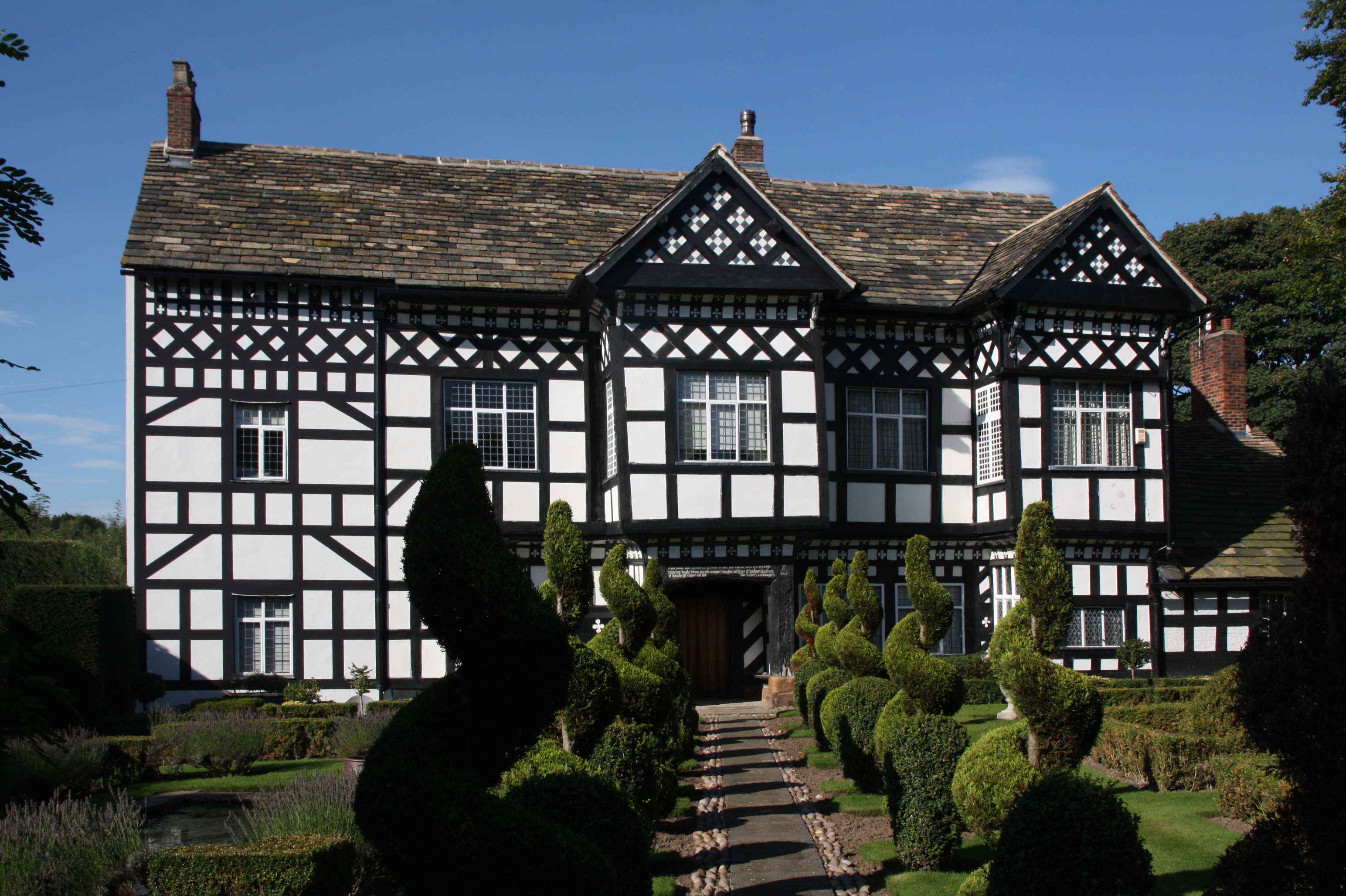
The family home, Handforth Hall, Cheshire

Brereton was born 13 September 1604 at the family home, Handforth Hall, eldest son of William Brereton (1584–1610), and Margaret Holland (1585–1609). Orphaned at the age of six, he was made a ward of his maternal grandfather, Richard Holland of Denton (1549–1618).

As well as Handforth Hall, he inherited over 3,000 acres from his parents; in 1623, he married Susanna Booth, fourth daughter of another substantial local landowner, Sir George Booth, of Dunham Massey Hall, Cheshire.

George Moxon became his chaplain after being ordained in 1626.

Before her death in 1637, they had four children; Susanna (1627, after 1661), Thomas (1632–1674), Frances (1635–1676), and Catherine (c. 1637 – after 1661). He took a second wife in 1641, Cicely Mytton, a wealthy Staffordshire widow, who died in 1649, and they had a daughter, Cecilia (c. 1642–1704). His will left Catherine and Cecilia £1,000 each.

== Career; pre-1642 ==
He graduated from Brasenose College, Oxford, in 1621, and as was then common, studied law at Gray's Inn prior to his marriage in 1623. It was here that he became friends with John Bradshaw, a lawyer from Cheshire who served as judge during the Trial of Charles I in January 1649.

Like his maternal grandfather and father-in-law, Brereton was a zealous Puritan, a generic term for anyone who wanted to reform, or 'purify', the Church of England. The most prominent were Presbyterians, who wanted to bring its doctrine and structure into line with the Church of Scotland, and included Parliamentary leaders like John Pym and John Hampden. Based on his support for the Congregationalist radical, Samuel Eaton, and the reforms advocated by Sir Henry Vane the Younger in 1641, Brereton appears to have sympathised with those who rejected the concept of state-ordained religion.

Appointed Deputy lieutenant for Cheshire, he was an unusually active Justice of the Peace, or JP, attending over 80% of sessions held between 1625 and 1641; in the same period, only one other person managed over 40%. In 1627, he was made a baronet in return for funding 30 soldiers in Ireland for three years. In the 1628 Parliament, Brereton was elected MP for Cheshire; Charles I dissolved Parliament in 1629, and did not call another until 1640, instituting a period of Personal Rule sometimes called the "Eleven Year Tyranny".

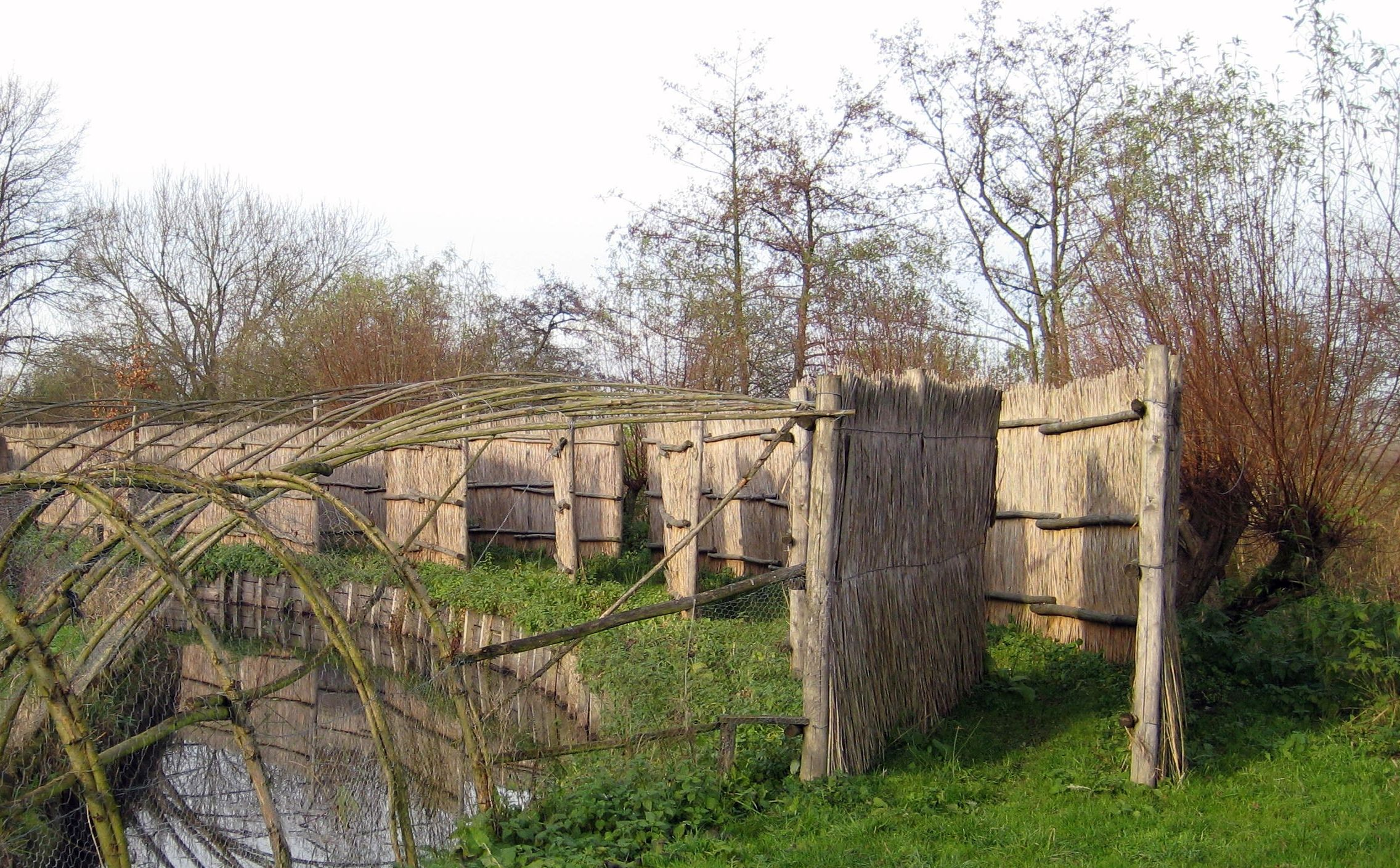
Modern example of a duck decoy, similar to those installed by Brereton

In the summer of 1634, Brereton visited the Dutch Republic and later published a detailed account of his travels. He installed the Dutch system of duck decoys on his lands, leading to disputes with his neighbours, who claimed it interfered with their hunting and hawking. Another journal covered his trip through North East England, the Scottish Lowlands, and Ireland in 1635. He later visited France, and possibly Northern Italy, although these writings have not survived.

Despite his opposition in principle to taxes levied without Parliament, he paid Ship Money and took little part in the political debates that dominated the late 1630s. His main interests were religious and he strongly opposed Archbishop Laud's reforms to the Church of England. In 1640, he was re-elected for Cheshire in both the Short and Long Parliaments, and appointed to a number of Parliamentary Committees on religion. In early 1641, he organised a petition from Cheshire demanding the expulsion of bishops from the Church of England, and also supported the removal of church monuments. Perhaps surprisingly, when Brereton visited Glastonbury in 1635 he made a point of taking "a special view" of the Holy Thorn, a notoriously papistical plant; he "brought away many branches and leaves, and left the first letters of my name thereon upon record".

== First English Civil War ==
Brereton's war 1642 to 1646; key locations mentioned in article

Following the outbreak of the Irish Rebellion in October 1641, Brereton supervised the transport of troops and supplies from Chester to Ireland. When the First English Civil War began in August 1642, this made him an obvious choice for commander of Parliamentarian forces in the area. However, most of the Cheshire gentry was Royalist, including his cousin, William, Baron Brereton, and he was forced to withdraw to London.

Along with a number of other regions, at the beginning of the war some prominent Cheshire notables attempted to remain neutral, and in December 1642 issued the Bunbury Agreement, which demanded an end to fighting in the area. This proved impossible to enforce and in March 1643, Parliament sent Brereton back to Cheshire with 500 men, where he linked up with 2,000 local volunteers. Despite lacking military experience, he soon proved an energetic and resolute commander, winning two minor but significant victories at Middlewich and Hopton Heath. Establishing his headquarters at Nantwich, he soon attained superiority over Arthur Capell, Royalist commander in Shropshire, Cheshire, and North Wales.

Over the next few years, Brereton waged an aggressive and relentless campaign throughout the North Midlands, one of his key subordinates being Colonel Robert Venables, a long-time family connection and friend, who later served in Ireland. Their activities forced the Royalists to divert resources from other areas, as Chester was essential for funnelling men and material from their supporters in Ireland and North Wales.

In October 1643, Capell was replaced by Lord Byron, who assembled an army of over 5,000, many of them veterans from the war in Ireland. Defeated at Second Middlewich in December, Brereton appealed to Sir Thomas Fairfax for support. At Nantwich in January 1644, their combined force routed Byron, who lost over 1,500 men, most of his artillery, and baggage train and spent most of the next two years blockaded in Chester.

At Malpas in August 1644, Brereton added to his reputation by routing Royalist cavalry under Marmaduke Langdale who had escaped from the defeat at Marston Moor. Combined with his influence in the region, this meant Brereton was one of the few to be exempted from the February 1645 Self-Denying Ordinance, under which army officers could not also be MPs. Chester finally surrendered in February 1646, and in March Brereton fought in the last major battle of the war at Stow-on-the-Wold. He then besieged Lichfield, one of the last Royalist strongholds in England, which capitulated in July 1646.

More than 2,000 of his letters from this period survive, and are one of the most important sources for understanding Parliamentary administration during the war. They also provide insights into its internal politics; Brereton was a member of the 'War Party', those who viewed military victory as essential before any negotiations with Charles. The 'Peace Party' included Denzil Holles, one of the Five Members whose failed arrest in January 1642 was a major step on the road to war.

== Post 1646 ==
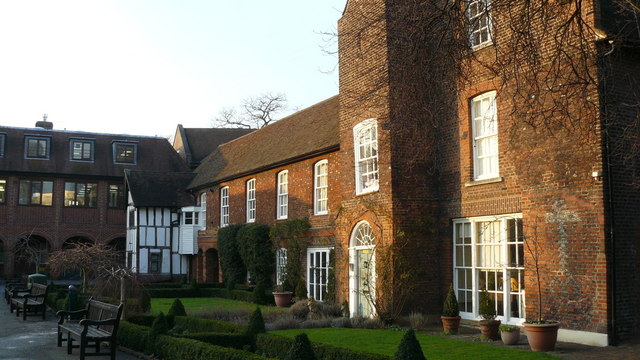
State apartments of Croydon Palace, now part of a private school

Historian John Morrill writes that in 1646, Brereton was 'one of the most powerful and influential men in England'. As a reward for his services, Parliament granted him possession of Eccleshall Castle, seat of the Bishop of Lichfield, and Croydon Palace, owned by the Archbishop of Canterbury. After Pride's Purge in December 1648, he retained his seat in the Rump Parliament, and was appointed to the High Court of Justice for the trial of Charles I in January 1649, although he did not attend.

Despite being elected to the English Council of State in 1651 and 1652, during the Commonwealth he lived in semi-retirement in Croydon Palace. The precise reasons are unclear, although it has been suggested he was disillusioned by the post-war religious and political settlement. In the 1656 election, he unsuccessfully stood for Cheshire in opposition to the list proposed by Major-General Bridge.

When the Long Parliament re-assembled in 1659, he took his seat once more but did not stand for the Convention Parliament. After the 1660 Restoration, he was obliged to return the church properties awarded in 1646 but was apparently allowed to stay on at Croydon Palace where he died on 7 April 1661. His body was originally conveyed to St Mary's Church, Cheadle, Cheshire for burial, but whilst the funeral cortège made its way northwards a horse stumbled crossing a river in spate and the coffin was temporarily lost. It was finally extricated from the water and was returned to Croydon. Parish records show he was buried in Croydon Minster.

== Sources ==
- Arnold-Baker, Charles (1996). The Companion to British History (2015 ed.). Routledge. ISBN 978-1138928831.
- Brereton, Sir William (1844) [written 1634–1635]. Marsh, Edward (ed.). Travels in Holland, the United Provinces, England, Scotland, and Ireland. Chetham Society.
- Brown, Hume P., ed. (1891). "Sir William Brereton". Early Travellers in Scotland. Douglas.
- Keay, Anna (2023). The Restless Republic. William Collins. ISBN 978-0008282059.
- Hutton, Ronald (2003). The Royalist War Effort 1642–1646. Routledge. ISBN 978-0415305402.
- Kyle, Chris (2010). Thrush, Andrew; Ferris, John (eds.). BRERETON, Sir William, 1st Bt. (1604-1661), of Handforth Hall, Cheshire in The History of Parliament: the House of Commons 1604–1629. HMSO.
- Morrill, John (1985). "Sir William Brereton and England's Wars of Religion". Journal of British Studies. 3 (24): 311–332. doi:10.1086/385837. JSTOR 175522. S2CID 143990745.
- Morrill, John (2013). "Brereton, Sir William, first baronet". Oxford Dictionary of National Biography (online ed.). Oxford University Press. doi:10.1093/ref:odnb/3333. (Subscription, Wikipedia Library access or UK public library membership required.)
- Robinson, AM (1895). Cheshire in the Great Civil War (PDF). Historic Society of Lancashire and Cheshire.
- Royle, Trevor (2004). Civil War: The Wars of the Three Kingdoms 1638–1660 (2006 ed.). Abacus. ISBN 978-0-349-11564-1.
- Sharp, David (2000). England in Crisis, 1640-60. Heinemann. ISBN 978-0435327149.
- Wheeler, Hadyn (2021). Clubmen 1645; Neutralism in a revolution. Minster Press. ISBN 978-1899499946.

Parliament of England
Preceded by Sir Richard Grosvenor, Bt; Peter Daniel	Member of Parliament for Cheshire; 1628–1629; With: Sir Richard Grosvenor, Bt	Parliament suspended until 1640
Vacant Parliament suspended since 1629	Member of Parliament for Cheshire; 1640–1653; With: Sir Thomas Aston, 1st Baronet 1640; Peter Venables 1640–1644; George Booth 1646–1653	Succeeded by Robert Duckenfield; Henry Birkenhead
Preceded by John Bradshaw; Richard Legh	Member of Parliament for Cheshire; 1659; With: Sir George Booth, Bt	Succeeded by Sir George Booth, Bt; Sir Thomas Mainwaring, Bt
Baronetage of England
New creation	Baronet (of Hanford); 1627–1661	Succeeded by Thomas Brereton
