= History of Middlewich =

Middlewich is one of the Wich towns in Cheshire, England.

Middlewich lies on the confluence of a number of natural and man made features: the rivers Dane, Croco, Wheelock and Weaver; the Shropshire Union and Trent and Mersey canals; and the A533, A54 and A530 roads. It is an important location for salt manufacturing, and has also been known for Cheshire cheese. The parish church for Middlewich is St. Michael and All Angels, which dates back to the 12th century.

== History ==
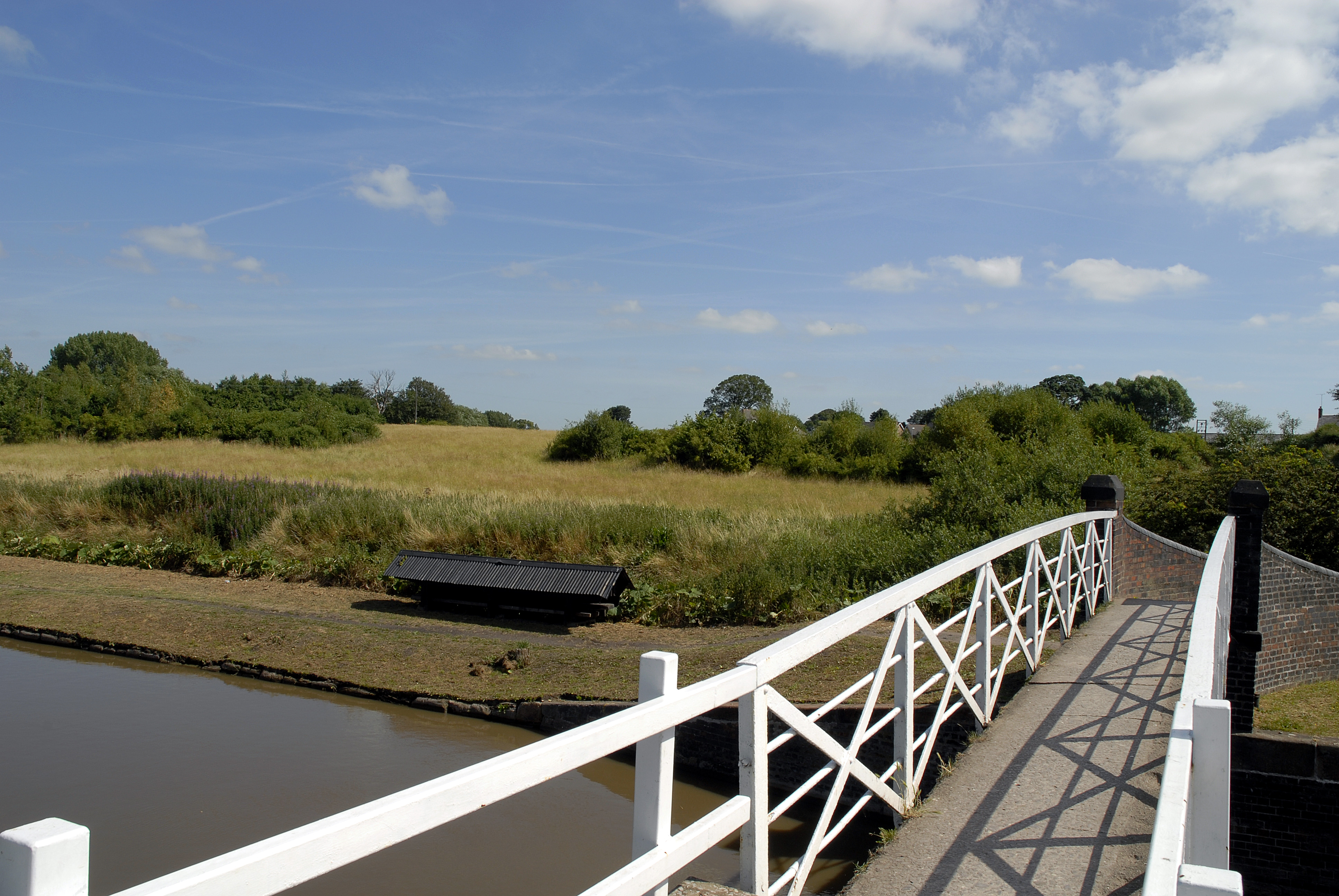
Harbutt's (or Harvest) Field, site of the Roman Fort (2006)

=== Prehistoric ===
In Whittaker's "History of Manchester" it is asserted that the Cornovii took Kinderton as their capital, however this is unlikely. It is probable that the Cornovii did inhabit Kinderton for its salt making potential.

=== Roman Middlewich ===
The town was founded by the Romans as Salinae on account of the salt deposits around it, as it was one of their major sites of salt production. Middlewich lies across the King Street fault, which follows King Street and then continues roughly following Brooks Lane. Salinae is taken to be the Roman name for "the salt workings" and it also appears to be the name given to Droitwich. During this time the Romans built a fort at Harbutts Field (SJ70216696), to the north of the town, and recent excavations to the south of the fort have found evidence of further Roman activity including a well and part of a preserved Roman road. A further excavation in 2004 in Buckley's Field has found further evidence of Roman occupation. A Roman Road, King Street runs between Middlewich and nearby Northwich. It has been postulated that this was the initial route of the Roman conquest of the North West of England, but evidence from pottery (in particular a scarcity of early Flavian samian ware) suggests that this is unlikely. Middlewich was a junction between seven major Roman roads, and it has been known as 'Medius Vicus' (the town at the junction of the roads) in the past.

=== The Normans ===
Before the Norman invasion of England in 1066, the area which is now known as Middlewich is thought to have had one brine pit, between the River Croco and the current Lewin Street. In the Domesday Book the area is described as being wasted, having been cleared by King William around 1070 as an ""act of rage against his rebellious barons". The Domesday Book states

Wich: Earl Hugh. Saltpan rendering 2 cartloads of salt.

=== The English Civil War ===
On 13 March 1643 (N.S.), during the English Civil War, the town was the scene for the First Battle of Middlewich, between the Parliamentarians, under Sir William Brereton, and the Royalist supporters of King Charles I of England, under Sir Thomas Aston, ending in the Parliamentarians taking the town.

The Second Battle of Middlewich took place on 26 December 1643. In the battle around 200 Parliamentarians were killed, along with a number of Royalists under the command of Lord Byron. The Parliamentarians lost the battle to the Royalists, who ransacked the town for food and valuables. An outbreak of plague immediately followed.

=== Middlewich in 1789 ===
In Cowdroys 1789 Directory of Cheshire, Middlewich is described as "a town which derives its name from standing in the Middle of two Wiches; namely, between Nantwich and Northwich. The situation of this place is on the river Croke, 156 miles from London. The prosperity and opulence of this town, like the former [Northwich], may be said to be, principally, preserved by salt; very considerable quantities being made here. Its weekly market is on a Tuesday; and its two fairs are annually held on 25 July, and on Holy Thursday. Middlewich is a deanery, hath burgesses, and other privileges, as the rest of the Wiches have. Half a mile N. E. from the town is the goodly manor-place of Kinderton, belonging to Lord Vernon, called The Barn of Kinderton. The town is well build, and a desirable place of residence not only for pleasantness of situation, but, what is far better, for the friendly and hospitable disposition of its inhabitants."

The directory goes on to list 4 esquires, 3 gentleman, 4 attorneys, 3 surgeons, a cheese factor, two publicans (of the Kings Arms and the White Bear), a school master, 2 haberdashers, a chandler, 2 tanners, 3 salt proprietors, 3 mercers, 2 clock makers, a timber merchant, a medicine vendor, a grocer, a book seller, a glazier and a keeper of the house of correction.

=== Middlewich in 1822 ===
In Pigot's 1822-3 Directory of Cheshire, Middlewich is described as "A town of considerable antiquity, in the county of Chester, is situated near the confluence of the rivers Dane and Croke. Its name is derived from being the middlemost of the Wiches, or Salt-towns; and its origin has been supposed as remote as the time of the Romans, The town is tolerably well built, and has a very respectable and agreeable appearance. The government of the town is vested in a number of burgesses, and its privileges are nearly the same as those enjoyed by the other Salt-towns. Being situated in a great farming district, the trades carried on here derive their chief support from the surrounding neighbourhood. The church is a large and handsome structure, and the vicarage comprehends several townships. It has also chapels for dissenters, and a meeting-house for the society of friends. Is distant from Chester 20 miles, and 166 from London. The market is on Tuesday. The fairs are April 25th. August 5th, and October 29th. The population is upwards of 2000."

The directory lists many professions and trades, including Attorneys, Bakers, Flour Dealers, Blacksmiths, Booksellers, Boot and Shoe Makers, Builders, Butchers, Coal Dealers, Coopers, Corn and Flour Dealers, Fire Offices, Grocers and Flour Dealers, Inns, Ironmongers, Joiners and Cabinet Makers, Linen Drapers, Liquor Dealers, Millers and Corn Dealers, Nursery and Seedsmen, Rope Makers, Saddlers, Salt Manufacturers, Salt Proprietors, Straw Hat Manufacturers, Surgeons, Taverns and Public Houses, Watch and Clock Makers.

The town was well-connected thanks to the Trent and Mersey Canal (Grand Trunk Canal) and the saltways connecting Chester with Northwich, Middlewich, and Nantwich. Pigot's directory lists carriers to London, Liverpool, Manchester, Gainsbro', Hull, Bristol, Birmingham, Wolverhampton, Derby, Nottingham, the Potteries and all parts of Yorkshire. There was a daily packet boat to Liverpool and Manchester, returning the same evening. Coaches ran daily to London from the Golden Lion. There were also regular coaches to Birmingham, Liverpool, Nantwich, Shrewsbury, and Manchester.

=== Middlewich in 1850 ===
The following is adapted from

The 1841 census records Middlewich as a market town, having 323 houses, and 1242 inhabitants (an average of 3.8 people per dwelling) although since Middlewich extended into Kinderton and Newton the actual population figure was upwards of 3,800. Middlewich parish in 1850 comprised Byley-cum-Yatehouse, Clive or Cliff (now part of Winsford, Croxton, Kinderton-cum-Hulme, Middlewich, Minshull Vernon (near Crewe), Moresbarrow-cum-Parme, Newton, Occleston, Ravenscroft, Sproston, Stublach, Sutton, Wimboldsley, and Weaver, (now Winsford). The total population of the parish was 4,755.

Middlewich in 1850 comprised 24 acres (97,000 m^{2}) of land, with its principal works being the surrounding farming district, a silk factory, and the salt works in Kinderton and Newton. A list of public houses was recorded and the following seven are still present today (although not necessarily in the same buildings): Boars Head, Golden Lion, King's Arms, [Old] Cheshire Cheese; Red Lion (now Lion House apartment building), White Bear and White Horse (now White Horse Business Centre).

=== Arrival of Railways in 1867/68 ===
Railways arrived in the Middlewich area in 1867 when the London and North Western Railway built a branch line from Sandbach to Northwich. The line was used for freight, including carriage of salt, from its opening in November 1867. A railway station was built at Middlewich, opening on 1 July 1868. Later, small "halts" were built at Cledford Bridge south of the town and Billinge Green north of the town, but these had a relatively short life. Middlewich station closed on 4 January 1960 The Middlewich branch line is still used by freight trains and occasional passenger specials.

=== Middlewich in 1887 ===
"Middlewich, town, par., and township, Cheshire, 5½ miles SE. of Northwich and 166 NW. of London by rail – par., 13,110 ac., pop. 5205; township, 37 ac., pop. 1325; town, 238 ac., pop. 3379; P.O., T.O., 1 Bank, 1 newspaper. Middlewich was held by the Earl of Mercia under Edward the Confessor. The town has an antique appearance. The trade is chiefly in salt, obtained from brine springs in the neighbourhood; there are small silk and fustian factories, and considerable quantities of fruit and vegetables are raised in the vicinity for the Liverpool and Manchester markets."

=== 1889 football violence ===
Middlewich Station was host to a fight between Football supporters from Crewe and Nantwich in 1889 in which the platform occupied by Crewe fans was stormed by the Nantwich fans and many sustained injuries.

=== Middlewich in 1910–11 from the Encyclopædia Britannica Eleventh Edition ===
"Middlewich, an urban district in the Northwich parliamentary division of Cheshire, England, 166m N.W. of London, on the London & North Western railway. Pop. (1901) 4669. It lies in open country near the river Dane, having water communications by the Trent and Mersey canal, and a branch giving access to the Shropshire Union canal. The church of St Michael and All Angels is of various periods and contains numerous monuments. In the streets not a few old buildings remain, making for picturesqueness, and a number of the fine timbered houses in which Cheshire abounds are seen in the immediate neighbourhood. Middlewich shares in the salt industry common to several towns, such as Northwich and Winsford, in this part of the country; there are also chemical works and a manufacture of condensed milk."

=== The First and Second World Wars ===
Unveiling of the cenotaph

In common with the rest of the United Kingdom, Middlewich suffered a decimation of its young male population during the First World War. The cenotaph near to the parish church (Image) lists the names of 136 men who died in this conflict, representing around 10% of the male population of the town aged between 15 and 45 years. Forty two inhabitants of Middlewich lost their lives in the Second World War, with a further death in the Korean War. The Brunner Mond salt works in Brooks Lane also erected a cenotaph in memory of the 16 men from the works who fell in the First World War, and the two men from the works who fell in the Second World War (Image).

=== The post war years ===
The period between the First and Second World Wars and following the Second World War saw extensive housebuilding within the town, with significant new houses being built in the King Street area to the north, Cledford to the south and the Nantwich Road/St. Annes Road region to the West.

The 1970s commenced with the building of a new road, St. Michael's Way, which allowed traffic moving from east to west through the town to bypass the main shopping area of Wheelock Street. During the construction of this bypass the Talbot public house on the town bridge was demolished, along with a number of shops opposite the Boar's Head public house, and houses on Lower Street/Pepper Street adjacent to St Michael and All Angels Church. This bypass successfully eased the flow of traffic away from the main shopping street, but the confluence of three major roads remains a bottleneck, which will be eased by a proposed eastern bypass. Since the early 1980s Middlewich has seen a significant quantity of new housing development, initially in the Sutton Lane and Hayhurst Avenue areas. New developments have recently been built on the sites of old salt workings to the south of the Roman Fort at Harbutt's Field, and near to the Norman Baron's moated manor house at Kinderton Manor.

In common with many local towns, for example Holmes Chapel, Northwich and Winsford people are attracted to the area because of good road links via the M6 and the relatively low price and availability of suitable building land.

Middlewich town centre, unlike the centres of other local towns such as Northwich and Winsford, was not heavily remodelled as a shopping centre during the 1970s and consequently many of the original shops remain. This contrasts with, for example, Winsford, where the High Street was demolished and replaced by Winsford Shopping Centre. However Middlewich has not capitalised on the potentials of this quaintness, and since there are no large supermarkets in the town, it has failed in becoming a shopping destination for residents of other towns.

== Salt production in Middlewich ==
Salt manufacture has remained the principal industry for the past 2,000 years. Salt making is mentioned in the Domesday Book, and by the 13th century there were approximately 100 "wich houses" packed around the towns two brine pits. By 1908 there were nine industrial scale salt manufacturers in the town, with a number of open pan salt works close to the Canal, however salt manufacture in Middlewich is now concentrated in one manufacturer, British Salt, who sell under the name Saxa, and also through third parties e.g. supermarket own brands. Salt produced by British Salt in Middlewich has 57% of the UK market for salt used in cooking.

== Population changes ==
Increase in the Population of Middlewich over the last 200 years

The figure to the right shows how the population of Middlewich rose through the 19th and 20th centuries. Some of this rise is attributable to a number of parishes being combined, for example parts of Newton were added to Middlewich in 1894, with Sutton having previously been added to Newton is 1892. These parish names live on in road names in Middlewich, for example Newton Bank and Sutton Lane. An Ordnance Survey map from 1882 shows the town with St. Michael's church in the centre.

== Historical townships in Middlewich parish ==
The church originally served a number of townships other than Middlewich:

- Byley

Incorporated Croxton and Ravenscroft (see below) in 1892. In 1936 Byley was again extended to include part of Leese. The population in 1801 was 130, in 1851 was 110, in 1901 was 199 and in 1951 was 217.

- Clive

Was incorporated into Winsford civil parish in 1936. The population of Clive in 1801 was 102, in 1851 was 155 and in 1901 was 147.

- Croxton

Was added to Byley in 1892. The population in 1801 was 45, and in 1851 this had risen to 49.

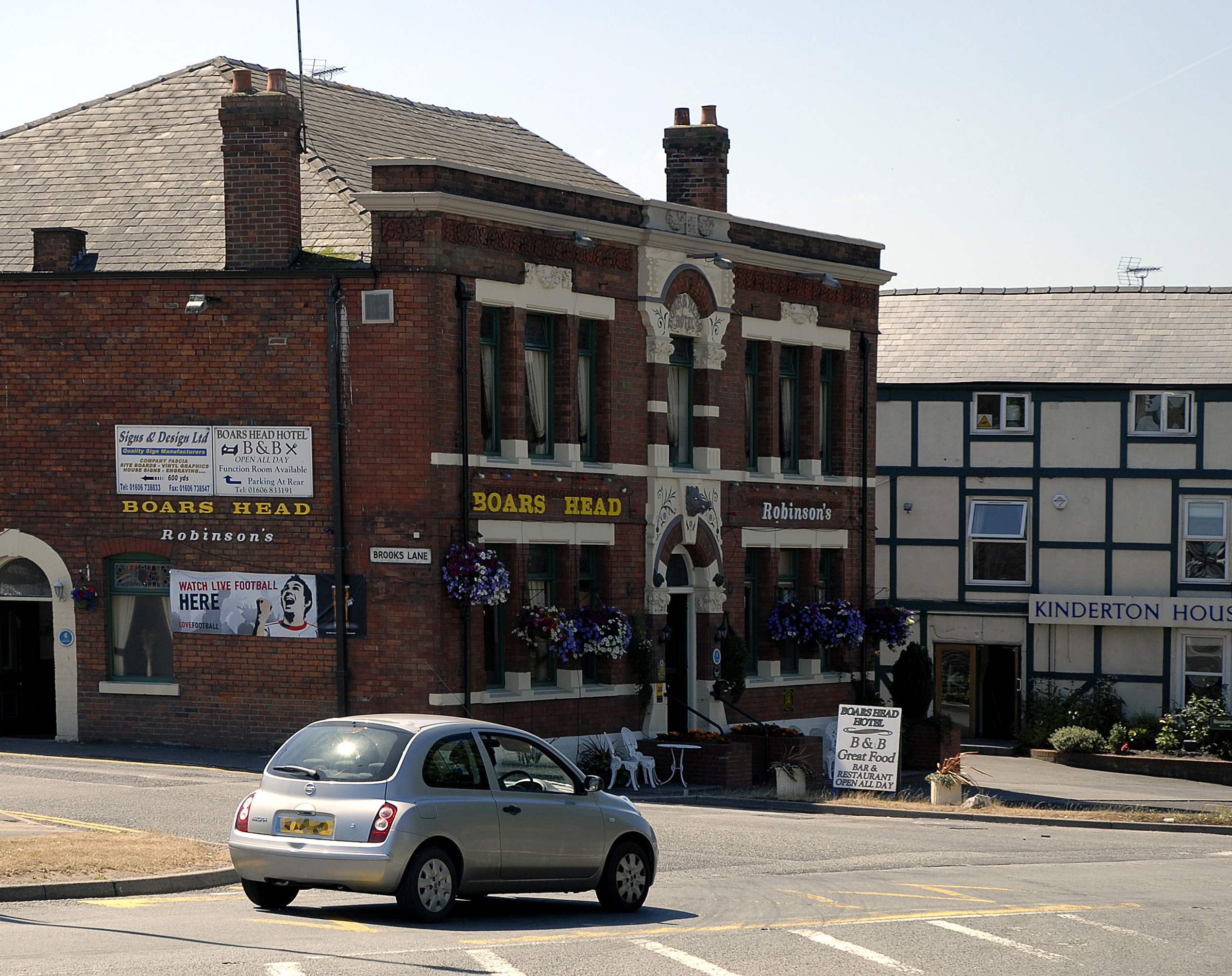
The Boars Head Public House, on Kinderton Street, Middlewich, England (2006)

- Kinderton cum Hulme

Most of the population of Kinderton cum Hulme was transferred to Middlewich in 1894, with the remainder being merged with Newton to create Kinderton civil parish. Hulme was transferred to Sproston in 1936, along with Higher Daleacre to Bradwall and the remainder to Middlewich. The population in 1801 was 404, in 1851 was 450 and in 1901 was 286.

- Minshull Vernon

Includes the hamlets of Bradfield Green, Eardswich, Hoolgrave, Minshull Hill, Walley's Green and Weaver Bank. Minshull Vernon's population in 1801 was 357, in 1851 was 375, in 1901 was 302 and in 1951 was 267.

- Mooresbarrow

Became part of Sproston civil parish in 1892. Its population in 1801 was 27 and in 1851 was 25.

- Newton

Was a township in Middlewich parish which was extended in 1892 to include Sutton (see below). In 1894 the majority of Newton was added to Middlewich civil parish, with the remainder being transferred to Kinderton. New included the hamlets of Newton Bank and Newton Heath, and most of the old town of Middlewich. Its population in 1801 was 943 and in 1851 was 1500.

- Occlestone

Was added to Wimboldsley civil parish in 1892. Its population in 1801 was 85 and in 1851 was 117.

- Ravenscroft

Was added to Byley in 1892. Its population in 1801 was 13, and in 1851 was 10.

- Sproston

Incorporated Moorsebarrow 1892, and in 1936 was extended again to include Hulme (from Kinderton cum Hulme). The population in 1801 was 150, in 1851 was 67, in 1901 was 167 and in 1951 was 216. Sproston is namechecked in the song Sproston Green on the album Some Friendly by British band The Charlatans (the band have recorded a number of albums at the Big Mushroom studios in Middlewich).

- Stublach

Was added to Lach Dennis in 1891. Its population in 1801 was 68 and in 1851 was 67.

- Sutton

Was added to Newton in 1892 (see above). Its population in 1801 was 30, and in 1851 was 23.

- Weaver

Became part of Darnhall civil parish in 1892. Its population in 1801 was 129 and in 1851 was 140.

- Wimboldsley

Was extended in 1892 to include Occlestone. The population of Wimboldsley was 106 in 1801, 86 in 1851, 183 in 1901, and in 1951 it was 189. Wimboldsley is the principal entry for Middlewich in the BBC's 1986 Domesday project (grid reference SJ6863).
