= Charles Lawrence =

Charles Lawrence may refer to:

- Charles Lawrence (British Army officer) (1709–1760), British Army officer and Governor of Nova Scotia, 1756–1760
- Charles Lawrence (merchant) (1776–1853), chairman of the Liverpool & Manchester Railway
- Charles Lawrence (cricketer) (1828–1916), Anglo-Australian cricketer
- Charles Lawrence (mathematician), American bioinformatician and mathematician
- Charles Lawrence (priest) (1847–1935), Archdeacon of Suffolk (1901–1917)
- Charles B. Lawrence (judge) (1820–1883), American jurist
- Charles B. Lawrence (artist) (c. 1790–1864), American painter
- Charles Drummond Lawrence (1878–1975), judge for the United States Customs Court
- Charles Frederick Lawrence (1873–1940), English antiquarian
- Charles Radford Lawrence (1915–1986), African-American sociologist and Episcopal Church (USA) official
- Charles R. Lawrence (born 1989), American ultramarathon runner
- Charles S. Lawrence (1892–1970), United States army colonel
- Charles Lawrence, 1st Baron Lawrence of Kingsgate (1855–1927), Chairman of the London and North Western Railway
- Charles Lawrence, 2nd Baron Trevethin (1879–1959), British peer
- USS Charles Lawrence, a 1943 Buckley-class destroyer escort

== See also ==
- Charles Laurence (1931–2013), actor and playwright
- Charles Lawrance (1882–1950), designer of aircraft engines
