= St Michael and All Angels, Middlewich =

Coordinates: 53.1926°N 2.4446°W

St Michael and All Angels Church, Middlewich
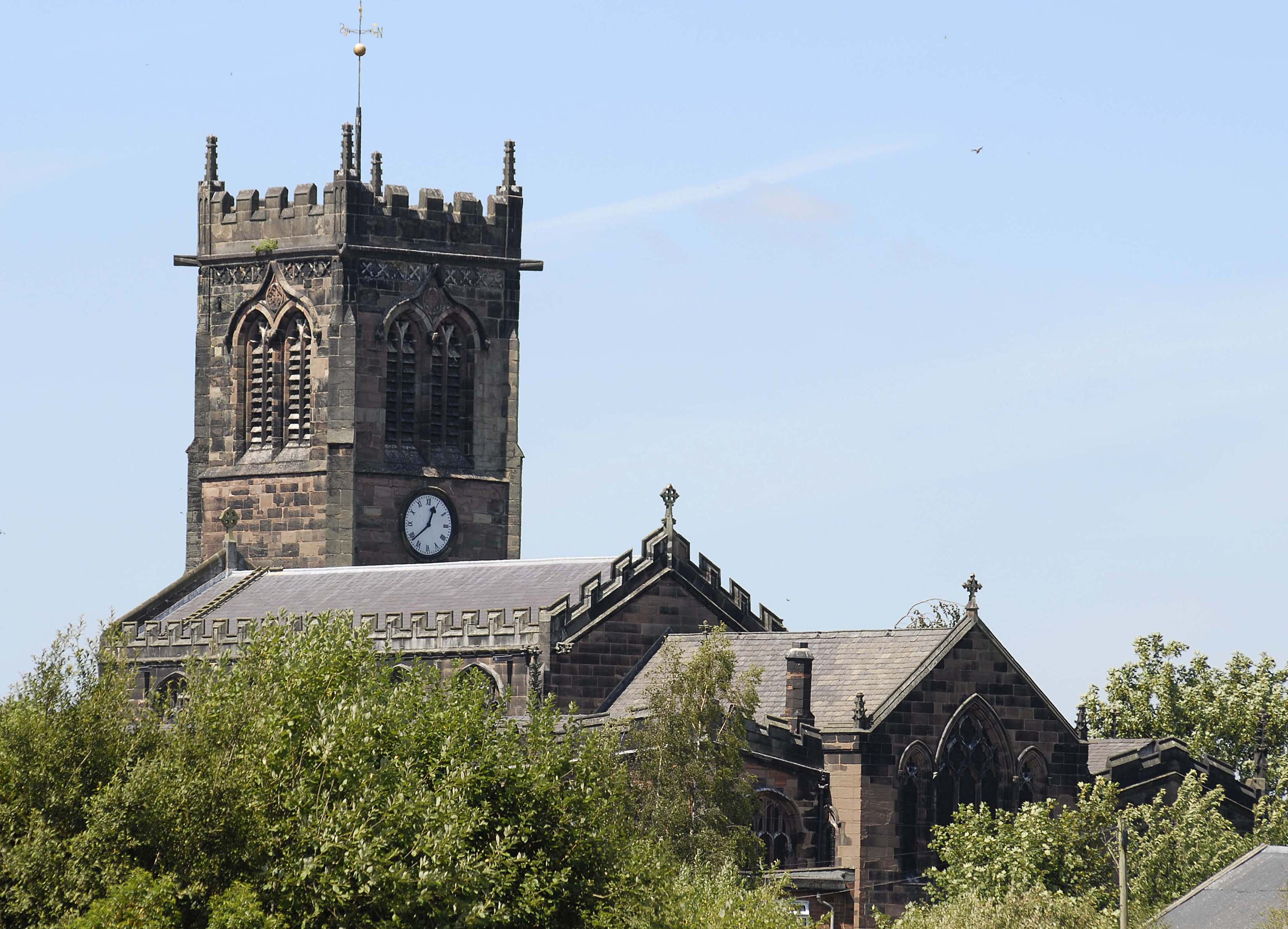
- St Michael and All Angels Church, Middlewich, from the southeast

- Location in Cheshire
- OS grid reference: SJ 703 662
- Location: Middlewich, Cheshire
- Country: England
- Denomination: Anglican
- Website: St Michael and All Angels, Middlewich

History
- Status: Parish church
- Dedication: St Michael and All Angels

Architecture
- Functional status: Active
- Heritage designation: Grade II*
- Designated: 5 December 1986
- Architectural type: Church
- Style: Norman, Perpendicular

Specifications
- Materials: Red sandstone

Administration
- Province: York
- Diocese: Chester
- Archdeaconry: Chester
- Deanery: Middlewich

Clergy
- Rector: Rev Simon Drew

St. Michael and All Angels is the parish church for the town of Middlewich in Cheshire, England. It stands at the junction of the A54 and A533 roads. The church is recorded in the National Heritage List for England as a designated Grade II* listed building. It is an active Anglican parish church in the diocese of Chester, the archdeaconry of Chester and the deanery of Middlewich. Its benefice is combined with that of St John, Byley. In 1947 the architectural historian Raymond Richards described the church as "the one building, in a depressing town, which is mellow and dignified".

== History ==
Parts of the church date from the 12th century, possibly the lower portion of the tower, but more likely the narrow arcade of the east bay. Most of the church was built during the period between about 1480 and 1520 when the nave clerestory was added, new windows were inserted, the Lady chapel was built at the east end of the south aisle and a two-storey porch was added to the south side. In the following century the Kinderton chapel was added at the east end of the north aisle. The church was damaged during the English Civil War, particularly during the First Battle of Middlewich in March 1643, when the Royalists used it as a place of sanctuary. In 1801 restorations were carried out, including moving the Venables screen into the tower. In 1857 a window was added to the memory of John Hulse. In 1857–60 the north aisle and Kinderton chapel were remodelled by Joseph Clarke. This was a part of a general remodelling of the church, which included removing the whitewash from the interior of the church to reveal the sandstone appearance seen today.

== Architecture ==
=== Exterior ===
The church is built of sandstone and is mainly Perpendicular in style. The plan of the church consists of a tower at the northwest, a four-bay nave with a clerestory, broad north and south aisles, a two-bay chancel and a south porch. At the east end of the north aisle is the Kinderton chapel, built in the 16th century, and at the east end of the south aisle is a chapel which was formerly a Lady chapel.

=== Interior ===
The timber roof of the chancel was originally built by Sir William Brereton in 1621. This was replaced in 1951 with a design copying the original. The Kinderton Chapel (also known as the Bostock Chapel) is now used as the rector's vestry, and it contains the oldest monument in the church, a brass dated 1591 in memory of Elizabeth Venables, wife of Baron Kinderton. A Jacobean screen with the carved arms of the Venables family was originally at the entrance to the Kinderton chapel but is now inside the tower. The organ was built in 1908 by Conacher and radically rebuilt in 1964 by Rushworth and Dreaper. There is a ring of eight bells. Three of these were cast in 1711 by Rudhall of Gloucester, one bell was cast in 1841 by Thomas Mears II at the Whitechapel Bell Foundry, and the other four are dated 1897 by John Taylor and Company. The parish registers begin in 1604 and the churchwardens' accounts in 1636.

== External features ==
In the churchyard is a sundial probably dating from the late 18th century. It consists of a vase baluster on a circular stone step on brick base. The copper dial has a date which is illegible and the gnomon is broken. It is designated as a Grade II listed building.

== Clock ==
The parish registers record a payment to Thorley in 1640 to repair the clock and make a key for the doors. In 1699 the clock was carried to Nantwich for repair and returned, but this was then replaced by a new clock constructed by Gabriel Smith of Nantwich in 1708. The clock had an hour hand only, and the dial was painted on the stonework of the tower.

The clock of 1708 was replaced by a new one by J. B. Joyce & Co of Whitchurch in 1846 at a cost of £200 (equivalent to £20,158 in 2025). This included a ting-tang quarter chime and hour strike, the mechanism for this continued in operation until 1887. This clock was restored in 1902 and improved by the replacement of copper dials with illuminated ones and the addition of Westminster Chimes at a cost of £180 (equivalent to £19,129 in 2025). The chimes were inaugurated at the service held on 9 August 1902 to mark the Coronation of King Edward VII.

== Priests and Vicars of Middlewich ==
Priests
~1200	Warin	1342	John de Leysthorp	1429	Thomas Thikenes
~1250	Thomas	1349	John Bele	1459	John Heynes
1306	Richard Tuchet	1352	John Folvill	1484	John Bressnel
1329	John de Offord	1361	Thomas Fraunceys	1494	William Sutheworthe
1330	Andrew de Offord	1402	John Tochet
Vicars
1504	William Bithewaithe	1695	William Handford	1877	Francis Minton
1504	John Fornebye	1702	John Cowper	1902	Hesketh France Hayhurst
1525	Amerus Burdet	1719	John Cartwright	1904	Arthur Gascoigne Child
1563	John Knightley	1731	John Swinton	1921	Wilfrid Rawton Ingham
1568	Peter Presland	1737	Robert Moreton	1937	Albert William Harrison-Harlow MC
1580	William Kinsey	1780	William Kyffin	1947	George Richardson Kemp
1616	Robert Halliley	1787	Joshua Powell	1952	Leslie Edgar Evans
1646	Thomas Langley^{*}	1797	William Henry Heron	1957	Laurence Roy Ridley
1647	Matthew Clayton^{*}	1811	James Stringer	1969	Eric Alexander Owen
1662	Lawrence Griffith	1819	Isaac Wood	1971	Eric William Cox
1680	Thomas Faulkner	1864	Henry Goodwin

^{*}denotes joint ministers

== Gallery ==
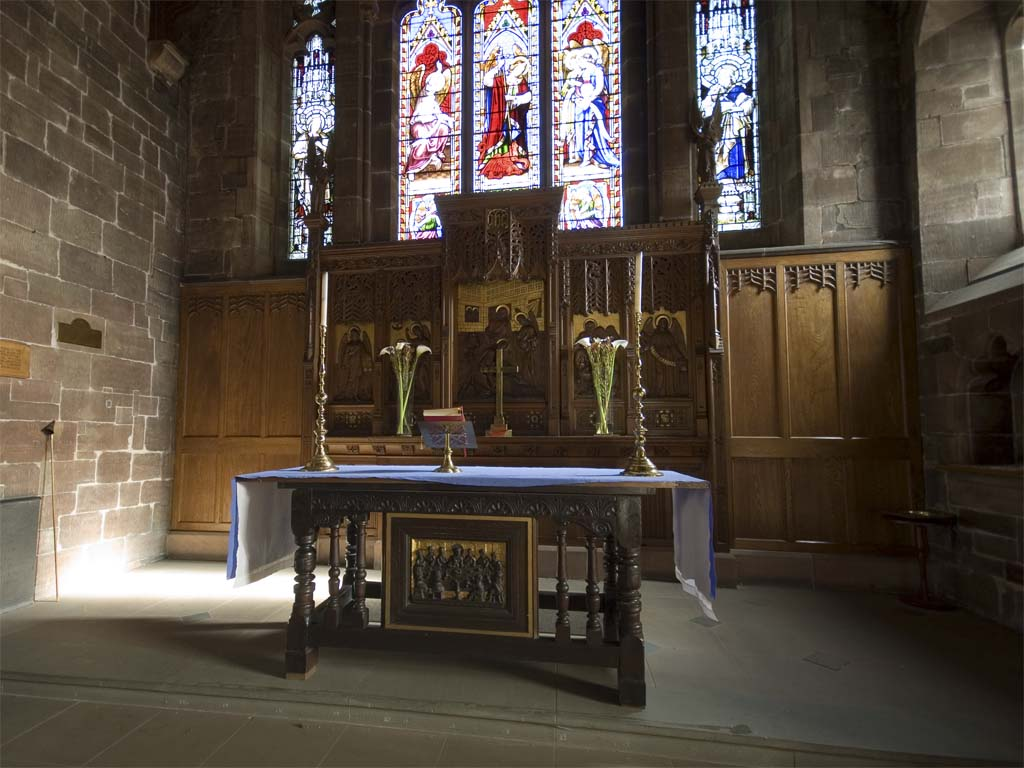
The main altar

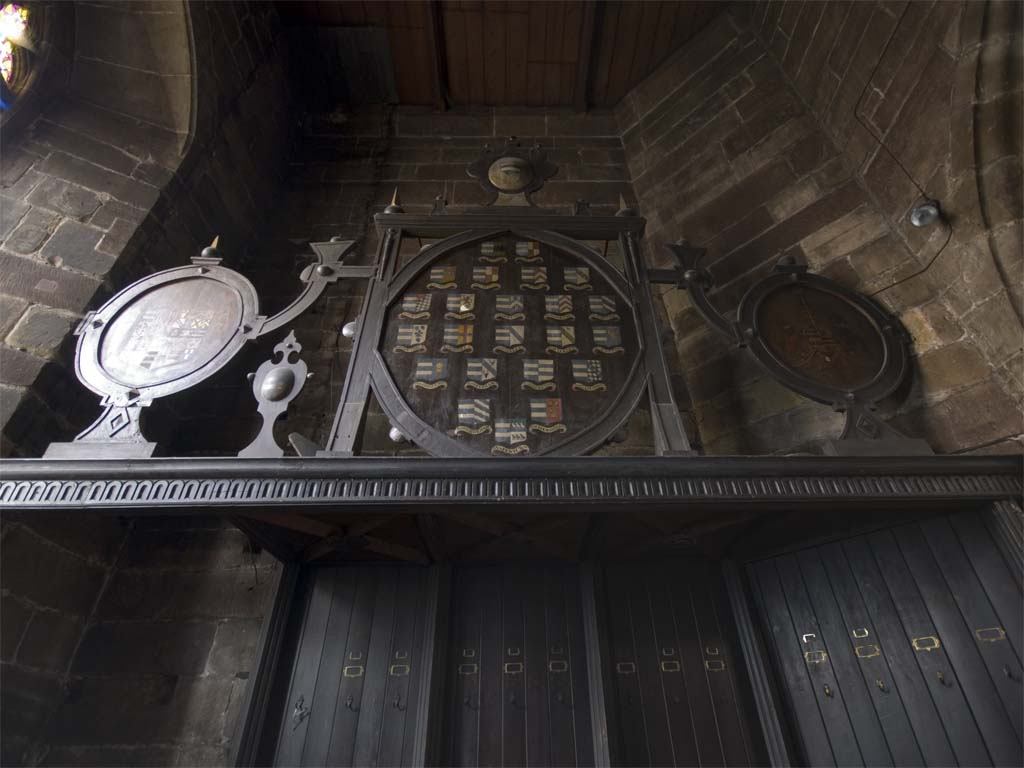
The Venables screen

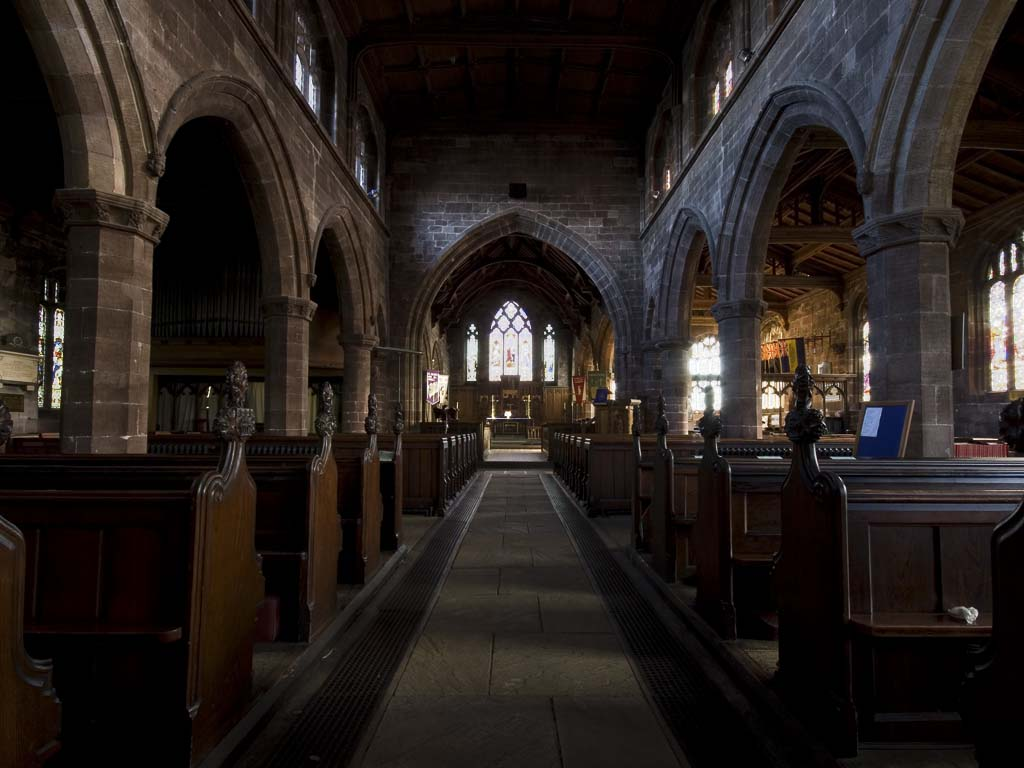
Interior of the church

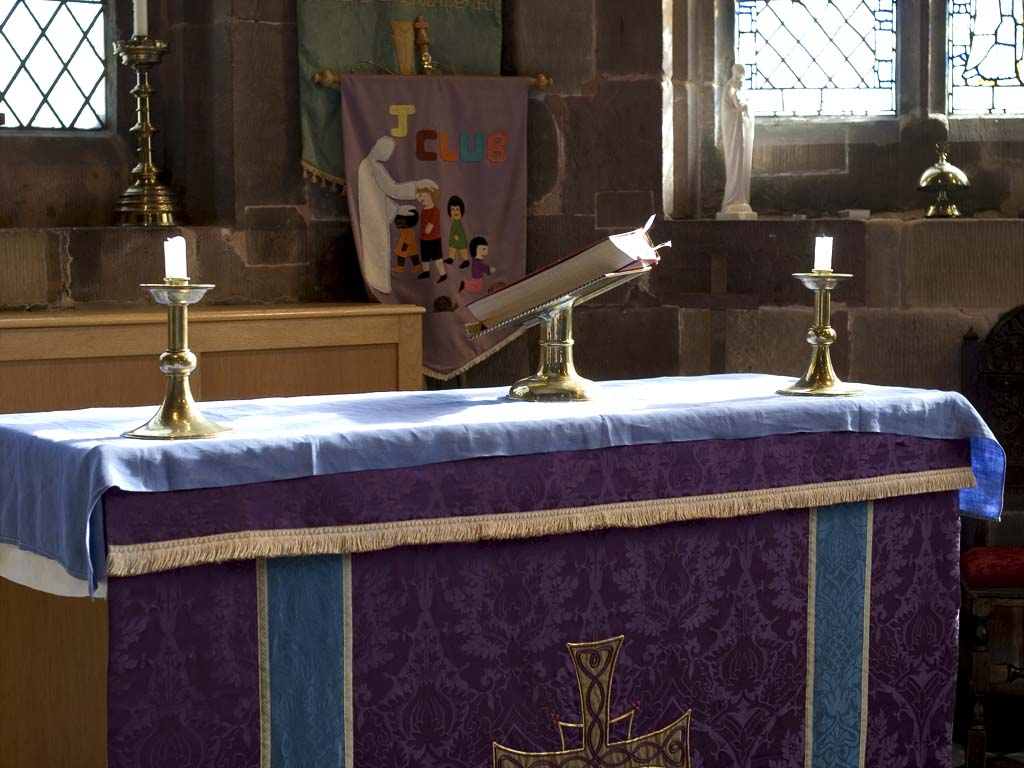
Closeup view of the South Altar

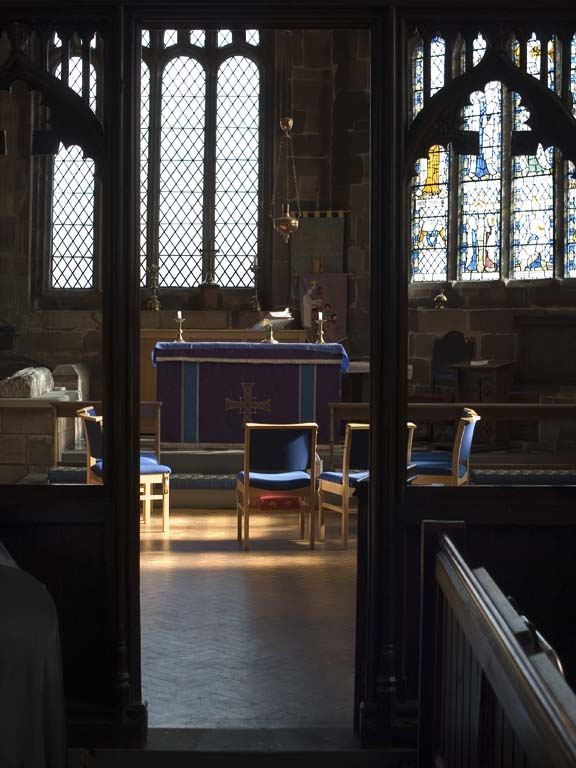
Distant view of the South Altar

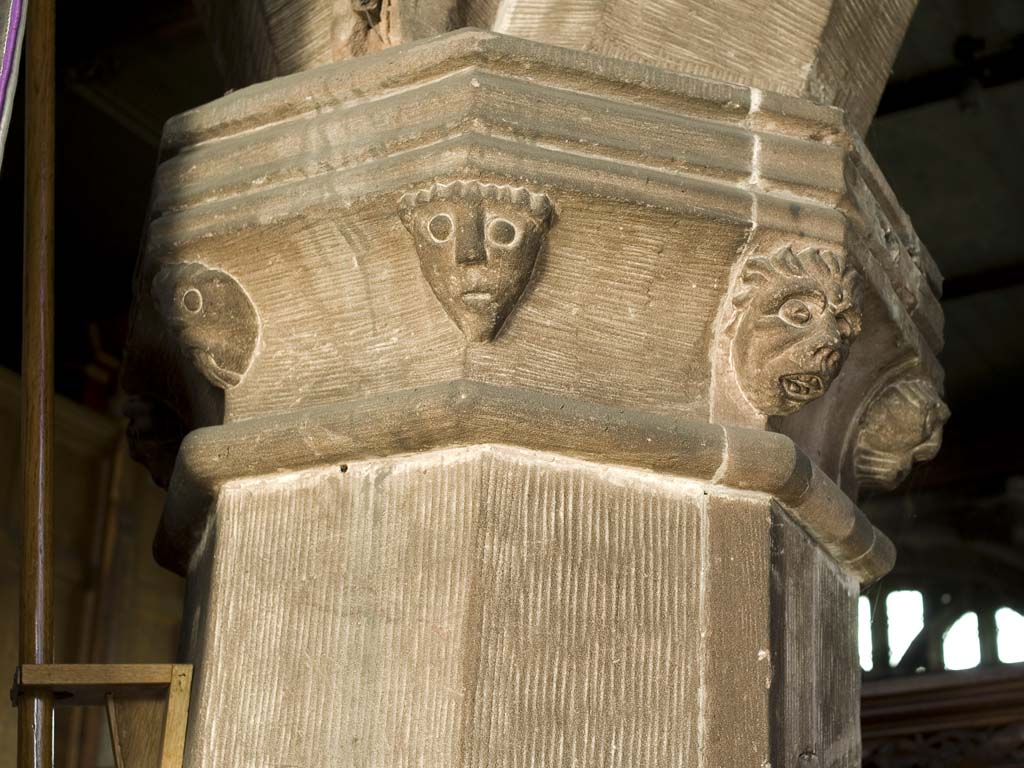
Detail of carving on one of the pillars

== See also ==
- Grade II* listed buildings in Cheshire East
- Listed buildings in Middlewich
