= John Wright Oakes =

English painter

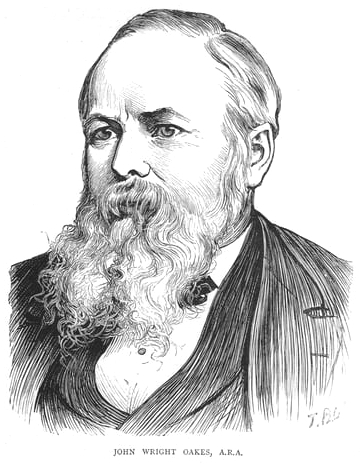
John Wright Oakes, by Theodore Blake Wirgman for The Graphic, 1876

John Wright Oakes ARA (9 July 1820 – 8 July 1887) was an English landscape painter.

He was born at Sproston House, near Middlewich, Cheshire, which had been in the possession of his family for several generations. He was educated in Liverpool, and studied art under John Bishop in the school attached to the Liverpool Mechanics' Institution. His earliest works were fruit-pieces. These he exhibited in 1839 and the following years at the Liverpool Academy, of which he became a member, and afterwards honorary secretary for several years.

About 1843 Oakes began painting landscapes from nature, and in 1847 the first picture exhibited by him in London, 'Nant Frangcon, Carnarvonshire,' appeared at the British Institution, and was followed in 1848 by 'On the River Greta, Keswick,' at the Royal Academy. He continued to send pictures, chiefly of Welsh mountain, moorland, and coast scenery, to these exhibitions, as well as to the Society of British Artists, Dudley Gallery, Portland Gallery, and elsewhere, and in 1859 came to reside in London.

He painted also in water-colours, and in 1874 was elected an associate of the Institute of Painters in Water-Colours, but resigned this position in 1875. He was elected an associate of the Royal Academy in 1876, and an honorary member of the Royal Scottish Academy in 1883. During the last six years of his life ill-health greatly interfered with the practice of his art. He still, however, exhibited annually at the Royal Academy, where a picture entitled 'The Warren' appeared the year after his death. Among his best works were 'A Carnarvonshire Glen,' 'A Solitary Pool,' 'Glen Derry,' 'Malldraeth Sands,' 'Aberffraw Bay,' 'Marchlyn Mawr,' 'Linn of Muick,' 'Dunnottar Castle,' 'The Bass Rock,' 'The Fallow Field,' 'The Border Countrie,' 'The Dee Sands,' and 'Dirty Weather on the East Coast.'

Oakes died at his residence, Leam House, Addison Road, Kensington, and was buried in Brompton Cemetery.

As of 1894, the South Kensington Museum had an oil painting by him entitled 'Disturbed,' an effect of early spring twilight. 'A North Devon Glen' was in the Walker Art Gallery, Liverpool, and 'Early Spring' in the Glasgow Corporation galleries.

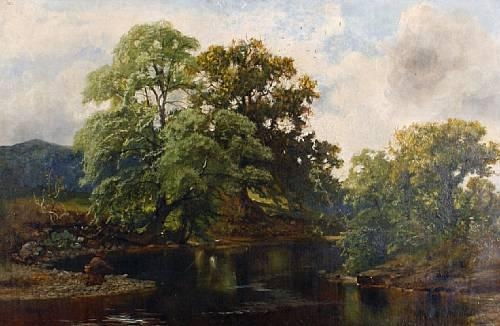
River landscape with an angler in the foreground, ca. 1887

== Sources ==
- Lee, Sidney, ed. (1895). "Oakes, John Wright" . Dictionary of National Biography. Vol. 41. London: Smith, Elder & Co. p. 289.
- Times, 13 July 1887; Athenæum, 1887, ii. 89; Bryan's Dict. of Painters and Engravers, ed. Graves and Armstrong, 1886–9, ii. 768; Exhibition Catalogues of the Royal Academy, British Institution (Living Artists), Society of British Artists, and Liverpool Academy, 1839–1888.
