= James Hargreaves (chemist) =

British chemist

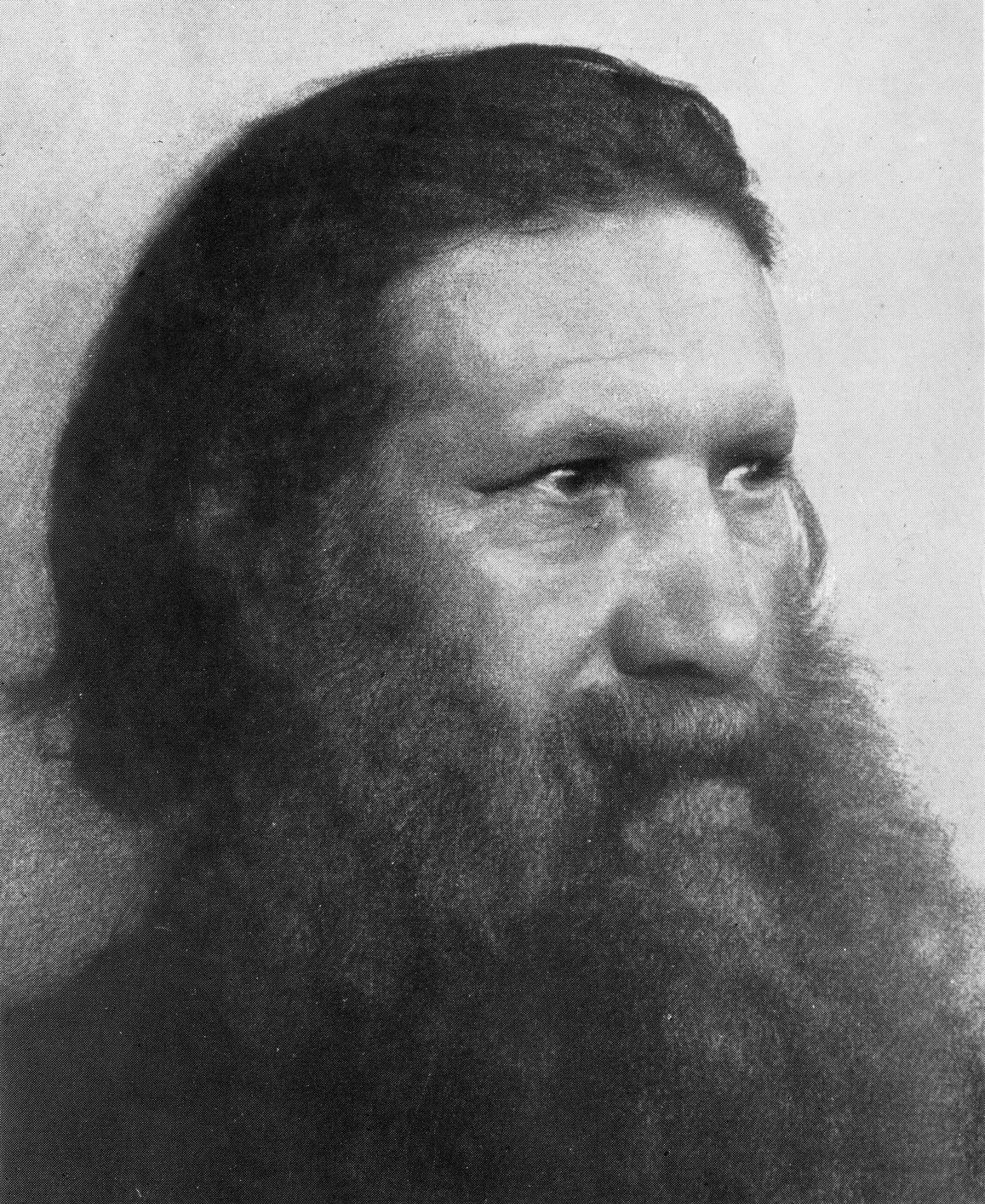
James Hargreaves

James Hargreaves (May 1834 – 4 April 1915) was a British chemist and an inventor. He was born at Hoarstones in Fence, Lancashire, the eldest child of James Hargreaves, a schoolmaster at Slaithwaite near Marsden. His father moved to Sabden but as he found his salary to be insufficient the father became a druggist in 1844, later moving to Preston.

== Inventions ==
Hargreaves worked with his father for a time and began to experiment in chemistry. One of his interests was to attempt to recover sulfur from alkali waste. At the same time William Gossage was working at the same project at his factory in Widnes. In 1859, at the age of 25, Hargreaves moved to Widnes and worked for Gossage. Here he made his first two important discoveries; the recovery of chromates which were used in the bleaching of fats and oils, and a method of bleaching brown soap. He was also involved with developing the process for making the commercially successful blue mottled soap. Around 1865 he left Gossage and worked with two other soap making firms, Hazlehurst & Sons in Runcorn and then Stephen Cox and Company in Liverpool.

In 1871 he set up a business with his brother, John, who had studied chemistry in Preston, as consulting chemists. James then embarked on further experiments. He suggested using sodium nitrate instead of air in the Bessemer process for manufacturing steel but this proved to be too expensive. He developed a process for recovering phosphates from blast furnace slag.

In association with Thomas Robinson, ca. 1870 he developed a process for producing saltcake (sodium sulfate) from salt without the use of sulfuric acid. The idea of treating sodium chloride with sulfur dioxide (sodium sulfite forms and is immediately oxidized by oxygen in the air) in order to omit sulfur acid production was tried by many chemists in the 1850s but no one managed to commercialize it before them. The Atlas Chemical Company was established in Widnes to use this Hargreaves-Robinson process. It was cheaper to produce alkali by this process than by the Leblanc process. The Atlas Chemical Company was absorbed by the United Alkali Company in 1890 but the process continued to operate until 1918.

With Thomas Bird, Hargreaves developed a process for the electrolysis of brine using asbestos diaphragms. In 1893 the General Electric Parent Company was established to develop this process. Bird died in 1895 and 1899 the General Electrolytic Alkali Company was set up at Middlewich, with Hargreaves as a director and his son Luke as general manager. Hargreaves cells were also built in France, Norway, and the United States. The process was in direct competition with the electrolysis of brine in mercury cells in the Castner-Kellner process but Hargreaves considered that mercury was too toxic a substance for workers to be exposed to.

Hargreaves produced other ideas and inventions. He advocated the use of chlorine rather than bleaching powder to disinfect sewage. He developed a "thermo-motor" which anticipated the diesel engine and at the time of his death he was developing a new type of cattle food. He also wrote articles for scientific encyclopaedias, gave lectures and travelled widely, becoming a good linguist. He died at his home in Widnes in 1915.

== See also ==
Coley, N.G. 'Hargreaves, James (1834–1915)', rev., Oxford Dictionary of National Biography, Oxford University Press, 2004
