= Middlewich Town Hall =

Municipal building in Middlewich, Cheshire, England

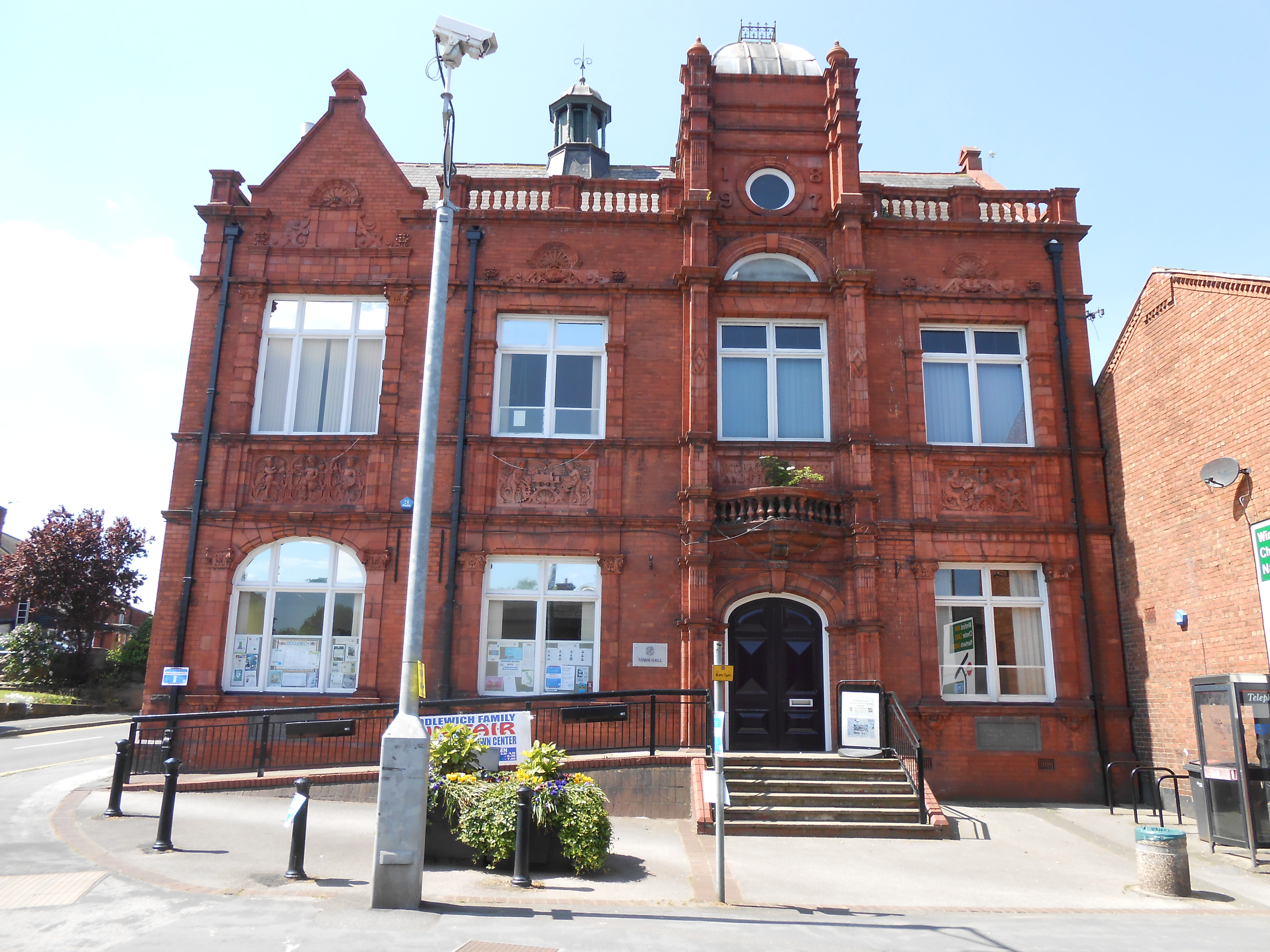
- Middlewich Town Hall

- Shown in Cheshire
- 53.1910°N 2.4439°W
- Location: Lewin Street, Middlewich

History
- Built: 1898

Site notes
- Architectural style: Renaissance style

Middlewich Town Hall, also known as Victoria Buildings, is a municipal structure in Lewin Street, Middlewich, Cheshire, England. The building, which was originally commissioned as a technical school and public library, is now the meeting place of Middlewich Town Council.

== History ==
The first municipal building in the town was a town hall on the Bull Ring, facing the street called Hightown, which was designed in the Gothic Revival style and completed in 1844. It was owned by the lord of the manor, James France of Bostock Hall. The building accommodated a butter market on the ground floor and an assembly room on the first floor. It was used for petty session hearings once a month and also incorporated facilities for the local Literary and Scientific Institute as well as a public library.

Following significant population growth, largely due to the status of Middlewich as a market town and the salt industry, Middlewich was made a local government district in 1869, administered by an elected local board, which was reconstituted as an urban district council in 1894. The town hall was gifted to the local board by its owners, the France-Hayhurst family, in 1887.

In 1897, the council decided to commission a new technical school and public library for the town as part of celebrations for the Diamond Jubilee of Queen Victoria. The site selected, which was occupied by a private residence known as Naylor House, was donated to the council by the industrialist and member of parliament, Sir John Brunner.

The foundation stone for the new building was laid by Councillor Edward Howard Moss of Cheshire County Council on 2 October 1897. It was designed in the Renaissance style, built with terracotta facings and officially opened by the Earl of Crewe in November 1898. The design involved an asymmetrical main frontage with four bays facing onto Lewin Street; the third bay from the left featured a three-stage tower with a round headed doorway with a keystone in the first stage, a semi-circular balcony and a cross-window in the second stage and section with a Diocletian window and an oriel window surmounted by a dome making up the third stage. The first bay, which was gabled, featured a round headed window on the ground floor and a cross-window on the first floor while the other bays were fenestrated by cross-windows. Terracotta panels were installed on the front of the building to illustrate the town's industrial history and there was a central lantern at roof level. Internally, the principal rooms were the classrooms together with a library and a reading room.

The urban district council remained based at the old town hall on Hightown until 1930, when the rear part of that building, including the council's offices, was demolished to allow for street widening. The council then moved to the Victoria Buildings on Lewin Street. The remainder of the old town hall was subsequently demolished in the early 1970s and the area redeveloped.

The Victoria Buildings ceased to be the local seat of government when the enlarged Congleton Borough Council was formed in 1974 and, instead the Victoria Buildings, as Middlewich Town Hall, became the meeting place of Middlewich Town Council.
