= Charles Frederick Lawrence =

English antiquarian

Charles Frederick Lawrence (April 15, 1873 – June 29, 1940) was an antiquarian who discovered a number of Neolithic celts in Middlewich in Cheshire, England. C F Lawrence was also the clerk to Middlewich town council, and wrote two histories of the town.

== Life ==
Charles Lawrence was the eldest son of John Lawrence, a builder in Middlewich. He was educated at the Church of England School, and in 1893 married Hannah Ramsell of Sandbach, at St. Mary's church, Sandbach. He was appointed the clerk to Middlewich Council in 1904 and remained in this position until retiring in 1938.

"Quite accidentally [Lawrence] realised his greatest antiquarian ambition when he found a Neolithic stone celt among some stones which had been thrown out in digging in Lawrence Gardens. This led to a considerable amount of spare-time digging, with the result that some rudely worked stones were unearthed in the underlying gravel, which have been pronounced to be Palæolithic. These are now in the Grosvenor Museum, Chester. A beautifully chipped Neolithic spear-head of flint, of the shouldered form rarely found in England, a bone needle, a done pin, two stone celts, and a bronze-flanged socketed celt, have also been discovered, some of which are preserved at Chester, and others in the town." (Bygone Middlewich, 1905)

== Bibliography ==
- History of Middlewich, 1895
- Bygone Middlewich, 1905 (reprinted 1936)
