= John Hulse =

English clergyman (1708–1790)

John Hulse (15 March 1708 – 14 December 1790) was an English clergyman. He is now known mainly as the founder of the series of Hulsean Lectures at the University of Cambridge.

== Early life ==
John Hulse was born at Middlewich, in Cheshire, the eldest of nineteen children from Thomas Hulse of Elworth Hall, Sandbach and Anne Webb of Middlewich. After attending Congleton grammar school, he entered St John's College, Cambridge in 1724 at the age of sixteen and graduated B.A. in 1728.

== Career ==
In 1732 he was ordained and served small cures, first at Yoxall, Staffordshire, and afterwards at Goostrey, a chapel under Sandbach. In 1733 he married Mary Hall of Hermitage and had a son. On the death of his father in 1753 he inherited Elworth.

== Personal life ==
In 1733 he married Mary Hall of Hermitage and they had one son Edward, who died at age 22.

== Death ==
Due to delicate health, Hulse resigned his clerical duties and lived there in seclusion until his death. He was buried in the parish church of Middlewich. The fullest account of his life appears to be the memoir prefixed to Richard Parkinson's 1837 Hulsean lectures, Rationalism and Revelation.

== Will ==
Hulse's will, dated 21 July 1777, is a curious and very lengthy document. It may be read in full in Cambridge University statutes. He bequeathed his estates to Cambridge University for the advancement and reward of religious learning, to be applied, first, to maintain two divinity scholars at St John's College, Cambridge; secondly, to found a prize for a dissertation; thirdly, to found and support the office of Christian advocate; and fourthly, that of the Hulsean lecturer or Christian preacher. Later editions of the endowments detail changes made in 1830 and 1860. The latest version of the statutes and ordinances are now available online at the Cambridge University web site. The Hulsean Fund is Statute E, Chapter VI and is discussed in the Ordinances Chapter 12, Trust Emoluments, Section 2.

=== Christian Advocate ===
By a statute in 1860 the Hulsean professorship of divinity was substituted for the office of Christian-advocate.

=== Hulsean Lectures ===
The Hulsean Lectures were originally to be given by a clergyman in the University, holding the degree of Master of Arts, who was under the age of forty years. Though the will made provisions for the lectureship, the funds were not sufficient to begin the lectures until 1820. In 1830 the number of annual lectures or sermons was reduced from twenty to eight; after 1861 they were further reduced to a minimum of four.
