= Middlewich =

Town in Cheshire, England

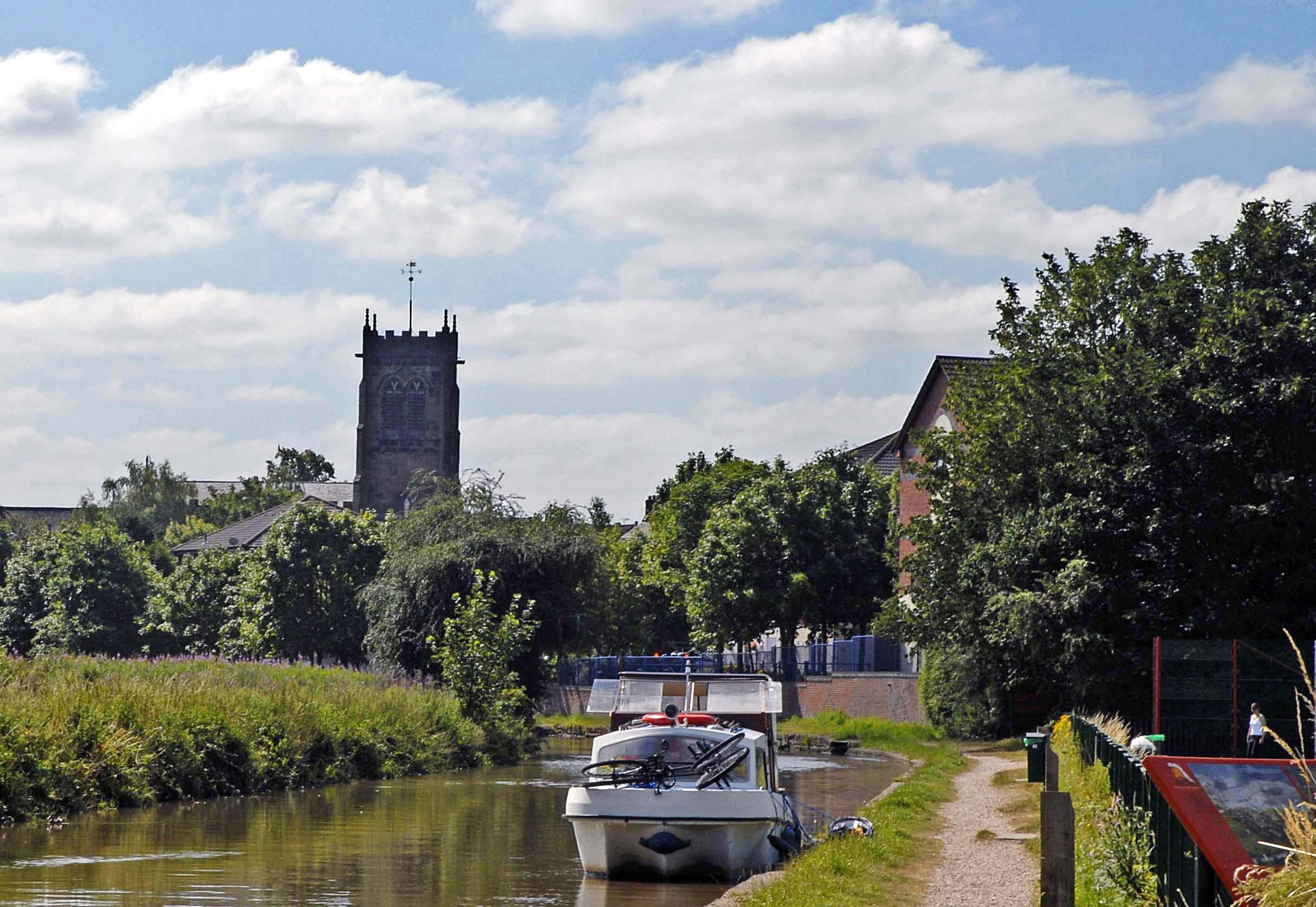
- The parish church of St. Michael and All Angels seen over the Trent and Mersey Canal

- Location within Cheshire
- Population: 14,421 (Parish, 2021)
- OS grid reference: SJ704663
  - London: 153 miles (264 km) SE
- Civil parish: Middlewich
- Unitary authority: Cheshire East
- Ceremonial county: Cheshire
- Region: North West
- Country: England
- Sovereign state: United Kingdom
- Post town: MIDDLEWICH
- Postcode district: CW10
- Dialling code: 01606
- Police: Cheshire
- Fire: Cheshire
- Ambulance: North West
- UK Parliament: Mid Cheshire

Middlewich is a market town and civil parish in the Cheshire East district of Cheshire, England. It is located 20 miles (32.2 km) east of Chester, 3 miles (4.8 km) east of Winsford, 5 miles (8.0 km) south-east of Northwich and 5 miles (8.0 km) north-west of Sandbach. The population of the parish at the 2021 census was 14,421.

Middlewich lies at the confluence of three rivers: the Dane, Croco and Wheelock. Two canals also pass through the town: the Shropshire Union and the Trent & Mersey, both connected by the short Wardle Canal. The town has three major roads: the A533, A54 and A530; there are also good motorway links to the nearby cities of Manchester and Liverpool. The town's population has doubled since 1970, despite a reduction in the number of manufacturing jobs in salt and textile manufacturing.

Since 1990, there have been initiatives to increase the volume of tourism into the town, through events such as the annual folk and boat festival, the Roman and Norman festivals, and regular farmers' markets.

== History ==
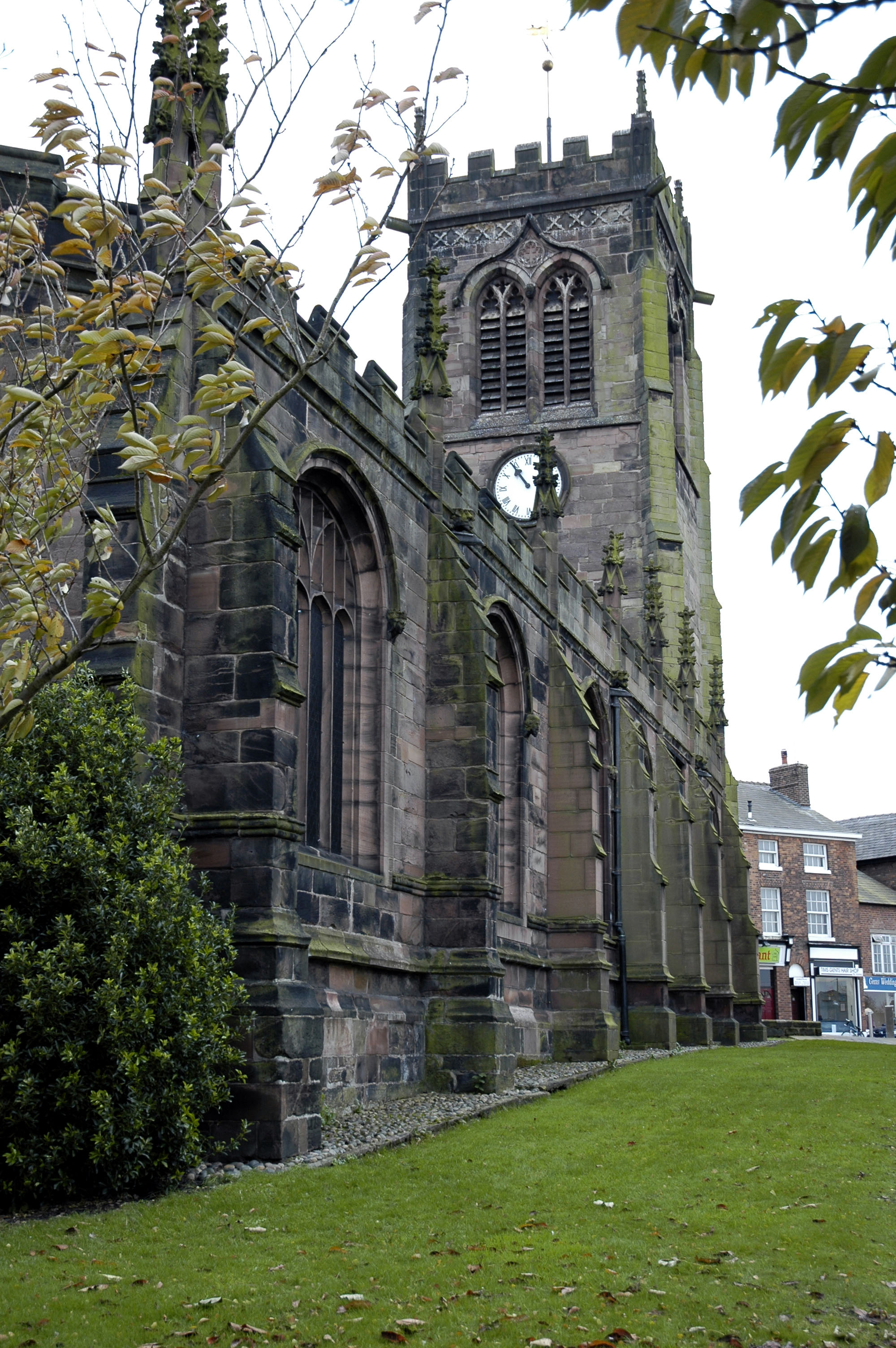
The Parish Church of St Michael and All Angels

In the Domesday Book Middlewich is spelt "Mildestvich"; the termination wic or wyc in Old English refers to a settlement, village or dwelling. It is also supposed that "wich" or "wych" refers to a salt town, with Middlewich being the middle town between Northwich and Nantwich.

Middlewich was founded by the Romans, who gave it the name Salinae because of its surrounding salt deposits. It became one of the major Roman sites for salt production, an activity that was centred on the township of Kinderton, about a quarter of a mile north of the present-day parish church of St Michael and All Angels. It has been suggested that pre-Roman salt production also occurred in the same area, but there is no supporting archaeological evidence. Whittaker's History of Manchester claims that the Iron Age Cornovii made Kinderton their capital, but it is more likely that the Cornovii inhabited Kinderton for its salt-making potential. There was once thought to have been a medieval castle at Kinderton, but that is now thought to have been unlikely.

Middlewich lies across the Queen Street fault, which roughly follows the Roman road, King Street, from Northwich to Middlewich. During their occupation the Romans built a fort at Harbutts Field (grid reference SJ70216696), and excavations to the south of the fort have found further evidence of Roman activity including a well and part of a preserved Roman road. An excavation in 2004, in Buckley's Field, also uncovered signs of Roman occupation.

Salt manufacture has remained the principal industry for the past 2,000 years, and it has shaped the town's history and geography. Before the Norman invasion of England in 1066, there is thought to have been one brine pit in Middlewich, between the River Croco and the current Lewin Street. In the Domesday Book the area is described as being "wasted", having been cleared by King William around 1070 as an "act of rage against his rebellious barons". Gilbert de Venables became the first Baron of Kinderton shortly after the Norman Conquest, the title being conferred by Hugh Lupus. A manor house was built to the east of the town and became the baronial seat of the Venables family. A Jacobean screen in the church of St Michael and All Angels has the carved Venables coat of arms. The title "Baron of Kinderton" is now vested in the Lord Vernon.

On 13 March 1643 the town was the scene of the first Battle of Middlewich, between the Parliamentarians, under Sir William Brereton, and the Royalist supporters of King Charles I of England, under Sir Thomas Aston. The second Battle of Middlewich took place on 26 December 1643, and claimed the lives of about 200 Parliamentarians, along with a number of Royalists under the command of Lord Byron.

The population of Middlewich rose during the 19th and 20th centuries. Some of this rise is attributable to a number of parishes being combined, for example parts of Newton were added to Middlewich in 1894, with Sutton having previously been added to Newton in 1892. Some will also be due to a general increase in population of the United Kingdom, and some of the increase would have been required to provide a labour force for the increased number, and scale, of salt and chemical works in the town. In the middle of the 19th century Middlewich was described as a town with principal works being the surrounding farming district, a silk factory, and the salt works in Kinderton and Newton. In 1887 the town was described as having an antique appearance, with its principal trade being salt, along with fruit and vegetables, and small silk and heavy cotton works. The town had one bank and one newspaper. By 1911 the Encyclopædia Britannica Eleventh Edition mentions the existence of chemical works and the manufacture of condensed milk.

Unveiling of the cenotaph

In common with the rest of the United Kingdom, Middlewich's young male population was decimated during the First World War. The cenotaph, near to the parish church, lists the names of the 136 men who died in that conflict, representing around 10% of the male population of the town aged between 15 and 45. Forty-two of Middlewich's inhabitants lost their lives in the Second World War, with a further fatality in the Korean War. The Brunner Mond salt works in Brooks Lane also erected a cenotaph in memory of the 16 men from the works killed in the First World War, and the two who died during the Second World War.

In the period between the end of the First World War until shortly after the Second World War, there was extensive housebuilding in the town; a significant number of houses were built in the King Street area to the north, the area bounded between Nantwich Road and St. Anne's Road to the west, and especially in Cledford to the south. The 1970s commenced with the building of a new road, St. Michael's Way, which allowed traffic moving from east to west through the town to bypass the main shopping street, Wheelock Street. Along with the bypass there was significant remodelling of the town centre, with the old town hall and library being demolished. This bypass successfully eased the flow of traffic away from the main shopping street, but the joining of three major roads remains a bottleneck, which will be eased by a proposed eastern bypass.

Since the early 1980s Middlewich has seen a significant quantity of new housing development, initially in the Sutton Lane and Hayhurst Avenue areas. New developments have recently been built on the sites of old salt workings to the south of the Roman Fort at Harbutt's Field, near the Norman Baron's moated manor house at Kinderton Manor, and on the site of the old railway station. One of the latest developments is on the old silk works next to the Big Lock public house. In common with other local towns such as Holmes Chapel, Northwich and Winsford, people are attracted to Middlewich because of its good road links via the M6 motorway and the relatively low price and availability of suitable building land.

== Governance ==
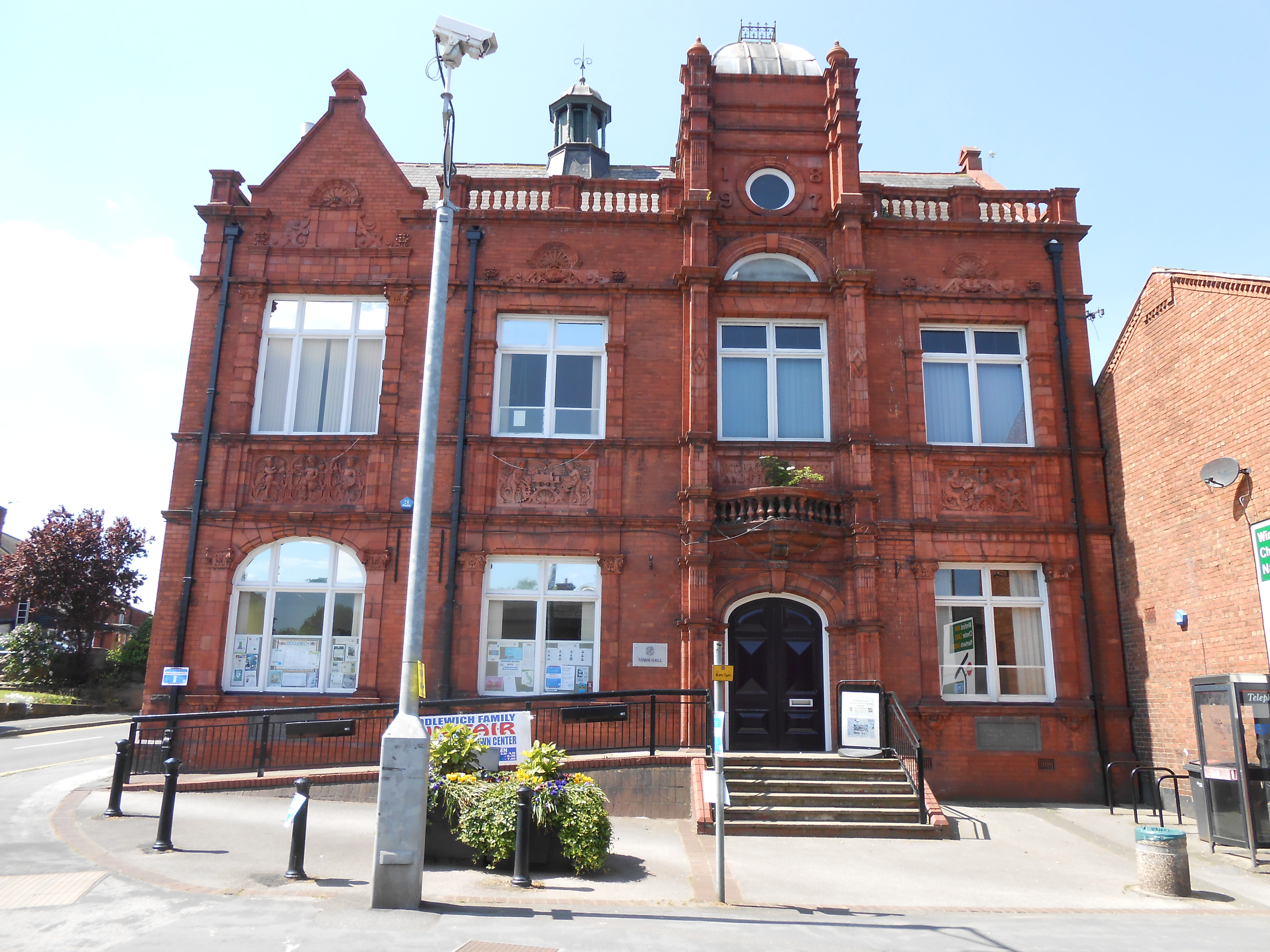
Middlewich Town Hall

There are two tiers of local government covering Middlewich, at civil parish (town) and unitary authority level: Middlewich Town Council and Cheshire East Council. The town council is based at the Town Hall, formerly known as Victoria Buildings, on Lewin Street. For national elections, the town forms part of the Mid Cheshire constituency.

=== Administrative history ===
Middlewich was an ancient parish. It was subdivided into fifteen townships: (Note: The parish also included some fields and a couple of houses in the township of Leese, the majority of which was in the parish of Sandbach.)

- Byley cum Yatehouse
- Clive
- Croxton
- Kinderton cum Hulme
- Middlewich
- Minshull Vernon
- Mooresbarrow cum Parme
- Newton
- Occlestone
- Ravenscroft
- Sproston
- Stublach
- Sutton
- Weaver
- Wimboldsley

Weaver was in Eddisbury Hundred, and the rest of the parish was in Northwich Hundred. The Middlewich township covered just 37 acres (15 ha) around the parish church and adjoining streets in the town centre; by the 19th century, the urban area extended into the adjoining townships of Kinderton cum Hulme to the north and east and Newton to the south and west.

From the 17th century onwards, parishes were gradually given various civil functions under the poor laws, in addition to their original ecclesiastical functions. In some cases, including Middlewich, the civil functions were exercised by each township separately rather than the parish as a whole. In 1866, the legal definition of 'parish' was changed to be the areas used for administering the poor laws, and so the townships also became civil parishes.

In 1869, a Middlewich local government district administered by an elected local board was established, covering a newly defined area which encompassed the township of Middlewich and parts of the neighbouring townships of Kinderton cum Hulme and Newton. The district was enlarged in 1893 to take in further parts of Kinderton cum Hulme and Newton, plus part of Byley. Such districts were reconstituted as urban districts under the Local Government Act 1894. The 1894 Act also directed that civil parishes could no longer straddle district boundaries, and so Middlewich parish was enlarged to match the urban district, and the parts of Kinderton cum Hulme and Newton outside the urban district were merged into a parish called Kinderton. The urban district was enlarged in 1936, notably gaining a large area from the parish of Kinderton, which was abolished.

The urban district council was initially based at the old Town Hall on Hightown, which had been built in 1844 and was gifted to the local board by its private owners in 1887. The rear part of that building, including the council's offices, was demolished in 1930 to allow for street widening, at which point the council moved to the Victoria Buildings on Lewin Street, which had been built as a technical school and library in 1898. The remainder of the old Town Hall was demolished in the early 1970s.

Middlewich Urban District was abolished in 1974 under the Local Government Act 1972. A successor parish called Middlewich was established covering the area of the abolished urban district, with its parish council taking the name Middlewich Town Council. District-level functions passed to Congleton Borough Council. In 2009, Cheshire East Council was created, taking over the functions of the borough council and Cheshire County Council, which were both abolished. In 2013, the ownership of Victoria Buildings and the adjoining Civic Hall was transferred to Middlewich Town Council from Cheshire East Council; they were renamed the Town Hall and Victoria Hall respectively.

== Geography ==
Middlewich

Climate chart (precipitation, max. and min. temperature)
J	F	M	A	M	J	J	A	S	O	N	D
70 6 1	50 7 1	60 9 3	50 12 4	60 15 7	70 18 10	70 20 12	80 20 12	70 17 10	80 14 8	80 9 4	80 7 2
- █ Average max. and min. temperatures in °C
- █ Precipitation totals in mm
- Source: "Records and averages". Yahoo! Weather. 2008. Archived from the original on 23 September 2005.
Imperial conversion
J	F	M	A	M	J	J	A	S	O	N	D
2.8 43 34	2 45 34	2.4 48 37	2 54 39	2.4 59 45	2.8 64 50	2.8 68 54	3.1 68 54	2.8 63 50	3.1 57 46	3.1 48 39	3.1 45 36
- █ Average max. and min. temperatures in °F
- █ Precipitation totals in inches

Middlewich is located at 53°11′31″N 2°26′35″W (53.192, −2.443), on the confluence of three rivers, the Dane, the Croco and the Wheelock. The town is approximately 2.5 miles (4.0 km) from junction 18 of the M6 motorway. The main westward traffic route between the motorway and Winsford, and also southbound traffic to Crewe, go through the town. There are three canals in Middlewich, the Middlewich Branch of the Shropshire Union Canal, the Trent and Mersey Canal, and the Wardle Canal, the United Kingdom's shortest canal at 100 feet (30 m) long.

The town sits less than 98 feet (30 m) above sea level, on Upper Triassic Mercia mudstone laid down with large salt deposits as part of the Cheshire plain, a boulder clay plain separating the hills of North Wales and the Peak District of Derbyshire, formed following the retreat of ice age glaciers.

The climate is generally temperate with few extremes of temperature or weather. The mean average temperature is slightly above average for the United Kingdom as is the average amount of sunshine. The average annual rainfall is slightly below the average for the UK. There are few days when snow is lying on the ground, although there are some days of air frost.

== Demography ==
Population growth in Middlewich since 1801

At the 2001 UK census, the Middlewich wards of Cledford and Kinderton had a total population of 13,101. Middlewich's population is relatively young; the proportion of children (aged 0–15) is 3% higher than the national average. Households are larger than average, consistent with a younger population, with an average of 2.51 people per household, compared to the national average of 2.36. Approximately 25% are single person households, compared to 30% nationally; the majority (almost 85%) of Middlewich's housing stock is owner-occupied.

Three-quarters of the 9,500 people between the ages of 16 and 74 are classed as "economically active", that is, either in full or part-time employment, or full-time students. Unemployment runs at around 2.2%, compared to 3.4% nationally. Eighty-seven percent of households own at least one car, primarily used for travel to and from work; nearly 77% of residents travel to work by car, 10% work from home, and the remainder use public transport, walk, or cycle.

Population of Middlewich since 1801
Year	1801	1841	1851	1891	1901	1911	1921	1931	1939	1951	1961	1971	1981	1991	2001	2011
Population	1,190	1,242	1,235	3,706	4,669	4,909	5,115	5,458	6,390	6,736	6,863	7,853	8,300	11,913	13,101	13,595

At the 2001 census, 16.3% of the population of Middlewich either did not answer the question about religion, or stated that they had no religion. The breakdown for Congleton showed that 99.3% of those that replied, and did not state that they had no religion, were Christian; the figures for Middlewich will be broadly similar.

== Economy ==
Middlewich has a traditional high street, with small shops on Wheelock Street, Hightown and Lewin Street. There are also five supermarkets, Lidl, Tesco Express, Morrisons and Morrisons Daily. Historically the major employers have been the salt industry and agriculture. Salt is still manufactured at British Salt, which employs around 125 people. The close proximity to the M6 motorway has led to the creation of a large distribution and business park, with companies such as Tesco and ERF locating to the site. Approximately 300 people are employed at the Ideal Standard factory, which since 1937 has been making vitreous china sanitaryware.

Tourism is one of the fastest growing industries in Cheshire, and Congleton Borough Council recognised the importance of Middlewich's canals in its attempts to promote tourism in the borough. Visitors to the 2003 Middlewich Folk and Boat Festival were estimated to have spent £2.3 million in the town over the two days of the festival.

Power for the town is provided from the National Grid for electricity, and National Grid Gas plc for natural gas. Fresh water supply and foul water collection is by United Utilities.

== Culture and community ==
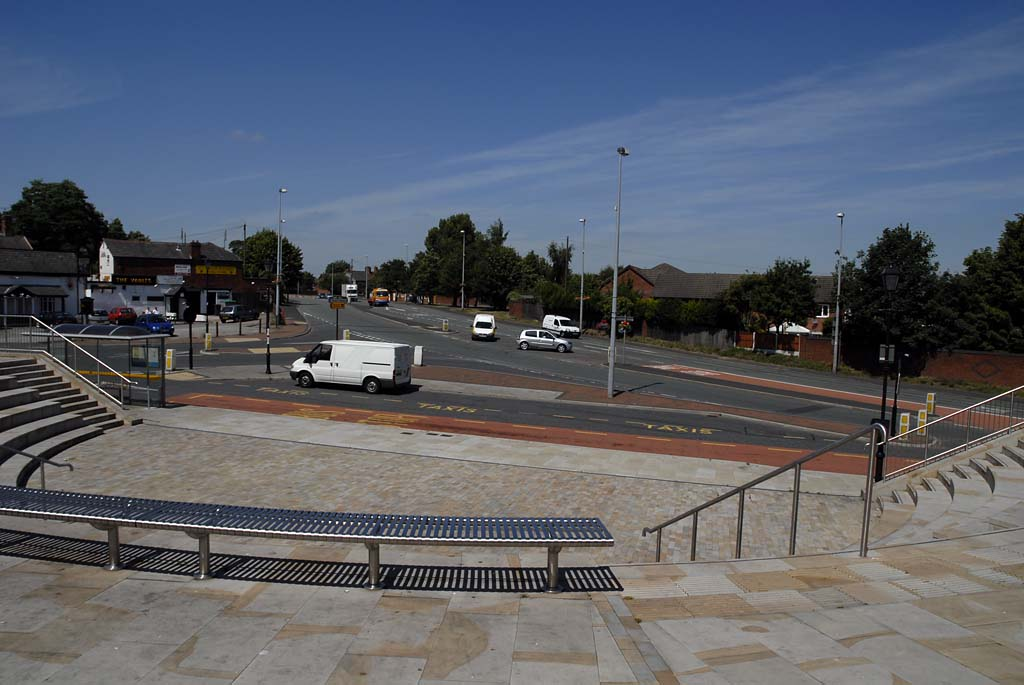
The Roman theatre in the Bull Ring

A highly regarded folk and boat festival has been run in the town every year since 1990, except for 2001 when it was cancelled because of a foot and mouth epidemic. It was also cancelled in 2020, due to the coronavirus pandemic. During the three-day festival (which takes place over a long weekend) folk artists play at a number of locations in the town, and it is estimated to bring in an extra 30,000 visitors to the town during the festival period, along with 400 narrowboats.

In addition to this annual event there have been a number of ad-hoc events, including the Middlewich Roman Festival in 2001. This Roman Festival led to a Heritage lottery fund grant which allowed the construction of a Roman theatre at the Bull Ring near to St Michaels and All Angels church. Since its construction this has regularly been used for other purposes, such as an open-air music stage and an ice-rink. Following the Roman festival in 2001, further Roman festivals were held in 2003 and 2007. Tim Strickland, a consultant archaeologist, was awarded a MBE for services to archaeology for his work in organising the Roman Middlewich Project. In 2005 a Norman Festival was put on in the town, and there are plans for an Industrial Festival. A series of arts and music events "@ the Bull Ring" was started in 2006.

The library, in Lewin Street, was built in the 1970s to replace the old library which was demolished to build St Michael's Way. It has examples of finds from Middlewich's Roman past on display. Fountain Fields on Queen Street is a traditional town park, with a number of facilities including a bowling green. It has been owned by the council since 1926.

Middlewich has had a football club since at least 1902. The current club, Middlewich Town, was formed in 1998, and plays in the Mid-Cheshire League. Middlewich also has a cricket club on Croxton Lane. There is a leisure centre which shares facilities with the high school. Middlewich is one of two large towns in the former borough of Congleton without a public swimming pool, in spite of the various initiatives that have been started to provide one.

Middlewich's hospital is Leighton Hospital near Crewe, part of the Mid Cheshire Hospitals NHS Foundation Trust. Primary care services are provided by the Central and Eastern Cheshire Primary Care Trust. GP services are provided by two medical practices. There are two dental practices.

== Media ==
Local news and television programmes are provided by BBC North West and ITV Granada. Television signals are received from the Winter Hill TV transmitter. Local radio stations are BBC Radio Stoke, Hits Radio Staffordshire & Cheshire, Greatest Hits Radio Staffordshire & Cheshire and Silk Radio. A radio station, Cheshire FM, launched in 2007, covered the mid-Cheshire area including Middlewich but closed in 2012. Mid-Cheshire Radio, launched in 2013, covers Middlewich, Northwich and Winsford. The town's local newspapers are the Middlewich Guardian and Chester Chronicle.

== Landmarks and religious sites ==
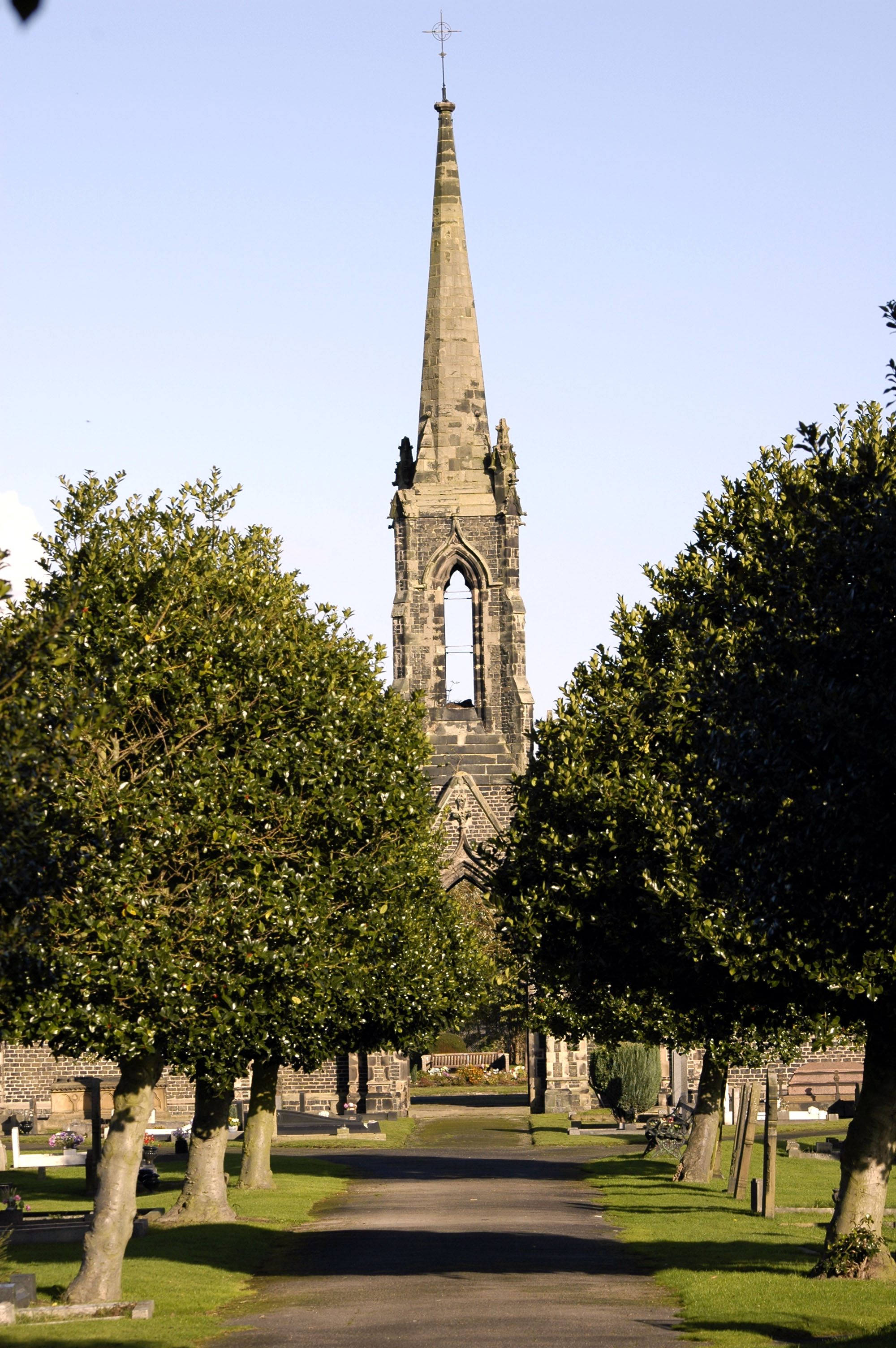
Middlewich cemetery showing the chapel

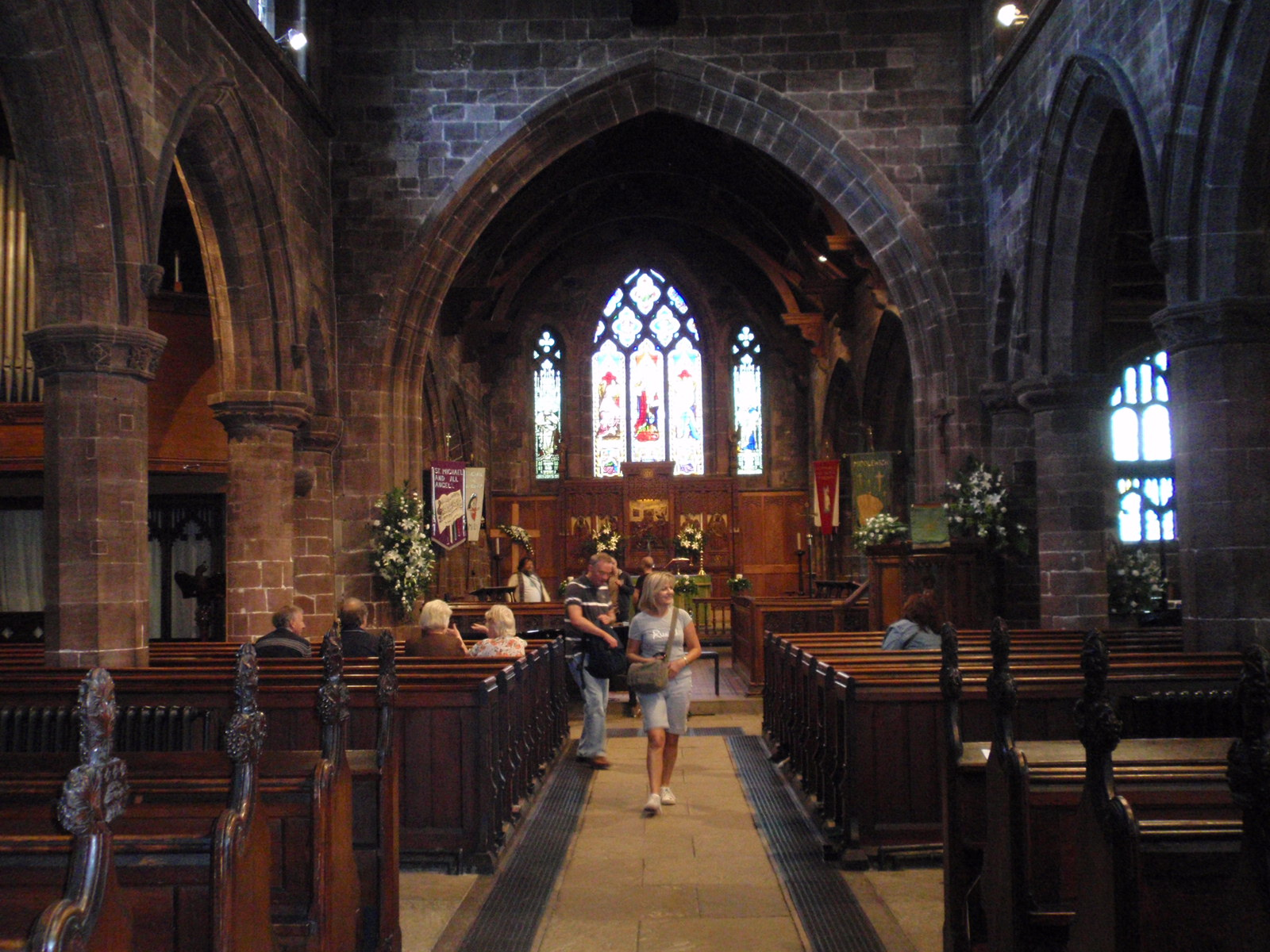
Inside St Michael and All Angels church, Middlewich, Cheshire, England

The principal landmark in Middlewich is the Anglican parish church of St Michael and All Angels, parts of which date back to the 12th century, although the majority was built during the 14th, 15th and 16th centuries. There was a general remodelling of the church during the 19th century, which included removing the whitewash from its interior to reveal the sandstone appearance seen today. The church was the site of fierce fighting in the first and second Battles of Middlewich during the English Civil War.

Other landmarks include: the Roman Theatre built on the Bull Ring on the site of the old town hall and library; and the town bridge, opened in 1931 as a replacement for an earlier bridge. Middlewich has a town cemetery with a twin chapel dating from 1859 by Bellamy & Hardy; it contains the Commonwealth war graves of 21 British service personnel, 17 from World War I and 4 from World War II. The Victoria technical school and library, which was opened in 1897, is a red brick and red terracotta building, "with a cupola but otherwise vaguely in the Loire style". Since 1900, the building on Lewin Street has been used as offices by the Town Council. One mile north of the town centre along King Street lies Ravenscroft Hall, which dates from 1837.

There are places of worship for five Christian denominations within the town: Church of England, Methodist, United Reformed Church, Catholic and Pentecostal. There are no places of worship for non-Christian faiths.

Middlewich Methodist Church was built in 2000 in Booth Lane, replacing the earlier chapel in Lewin Street. Middlewich United Reformed Church was founded in 1797, with the current church (the second on this site) in Queen Street being built in 1870, and completed in 1871. The church celebrated its bicentenary in 1997 with the publication of a history of the church, Two Hundred Years (not out).

Catholic masses were held in a cottage near the cemetery from 1848 until the building of the first Catholic church in the town in Wych House Lane in 1864. This church was enlarged to include the first Catholic school in the town in 1869. The church was later replaced by the modern St Mary's Catholic Church on New King Street in 1890, with the stone cross from the church on Wych House Lane being kept within the porch of the new church.

Middlewich Community Church is a Pentecostal church located in the former social club for the Brunner Mond works in Brooks Lane.

== Transport ==
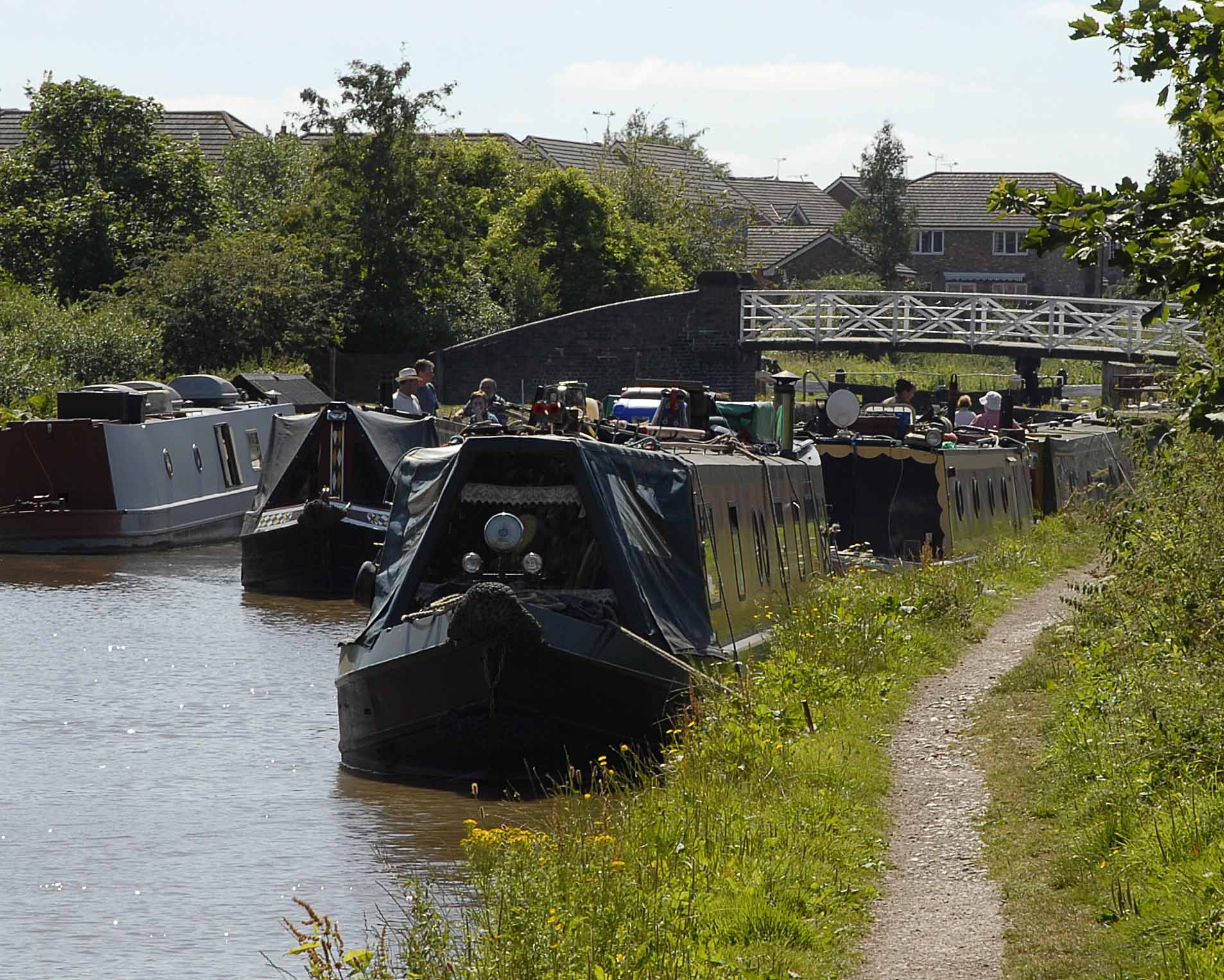
Narrowboats on the Northwich side of the Big Lock

=== Roads ===
Middlewich lies on the following roads:

- The A533 links the town to Northwich and Runcorn in the north, and Sandbach to the south
- The A54 connects it to Chester and Winsford to the west, and Holmes Chapel and Buxton to the east,
- The A530 links it to Crewe and Nantwich to the south.

In January 2026, Cheshire East Council approved construction of the £108m Middlewich Eastern Bypass scheme, to be built by Balfour Beatty. Due to open in Spring 2028, the 1.6 miles (2.6 km) bypass will connect Pochin Way (north of Middlewich) to the A533 Booth Lane in the south, and include bridges over the Sandbach-Northwich railway line and the Trent and Mersey Canal. Construction is scheduled to start in May 2026.

=== Buses ===
Two local bus routes to Crewe, Northwich and Congleton are operated by D&G Bus.

=== Railway ===
The nearest National Rail stations are at:

- Winsford, 2.3 miles (3.7 km) away, for London Northwestern Railway services between Crewe and Liverpool Lime Street
- Holmes Chapel, 4.3 miles (6.9 km) away, for Northern Trains services to Crewe, Stockport and Manchester Piccadilly.

Middlewich lies on a railway branch line between Sandbach and Northwich, but Middlewich railway station was closed to passenger traffic in 1959 and was demolished; the branch line is still used by freight trains. Efforts to get the line reopened to passenger traffic and have a new station built have been ongoing for nearly 30 years. In 2018, a request from the government to create an outline business case was announced. The request is being handled by Cheshire East Council, in conjunction with Cheshire West & Chester Council and the Cheshire & Warrington Local Enterprise Partnership, and will consider the cost and benefits of reopening the line and building new stations at Middlewich and Gadbrook Park.

=== Canals ===
Following a petition in 1766, the Trent and Mersey Canal was diverted from its original course to provide transport to the town and now links with a branch of the Shropshire Union Canal. The link between the two canals, which was opened in 1833, is actually a third canal known as the Wardle Canal; at about 100 feet (30 m) in length, it is the shortest canal in the United Kingdom.

=== Airports ===
Middlewich is 19 miles (31 km) from Manchester Airport, the busiest airport in the UK outside London, and 26 miles (42 km) from Liverpool John Lennon Airport.

== Education ==
There were three schools in Middlewich in the mid-19th century: the British School in Newton Bank; the National School in Cow Lane (Brooks Lane); and the Grammar School, close to the site of the largest Tesco store. A Church of England school was erected in Lewin Street in 1854 and extended in 1871. It soon became known as the National School, with the result that the earlier school was demolished. The later National School was itself demolished in the 1980s and is the site of the Salinae Day Care Centre, opened in 1995. At the turn of the 20th century two new schools were built: St Mary's Catholic school, whose keystone was laid in 1899 by Col. France-Hayhurst, and the secondary school, opened by France-Hayhurst in 1906. At the start of the 21st century there were seven schools in Middlewich: one infant, one junior, four primary schools and one secondary school. Cledford Primary School tends to accept students from the South of the town. It has now amalgamated with Cledford Infant And Nursery School. It is also in federation with Gainsborough Primary School. Middlewich Primary School caters for children from the older, northern, part of the town, whilst St Mary's Catholic Primary School receives Catholic children from the town. Work began on the original buildings for the secondary school, Middlewich High School, in 1906, with later additions improving the teaching areas and providing a sports hall which could also be used by the wider community. The school opened on 1 November 1906. In 2007 it was ranked 34 out of 50 by GCSE results for schools in Cheshire in the 2007 league tables. Byley Primary School and Wimboldsley Community Primary School serve children from outside the immediate bounds of the town.

== Notable residents ==
Notable residents include the theologians John Hulse (1708–1790) who founded the Hulsean lectures at Cambridge University, and Theophilus Lindsey (1723 OS – 1808) who inspired the Feathers Tavern Petition against clerical subscription to the Thirty-Nine Articles, and so helped start one of the most profound debates within the Church of England in the 18th century. Elizabeth Ashbridge (1713–55), an 18th-century Quaker minister, was born in the town, as was William Benbow (1787–1864), a nonconformist preacher, pamphleteer and publisher. He was a prominent figure of the Reform Movement for widening the franchise.

The France-Hayhurst family were local landowners responsible for the development of the model village at Bostock, and Charles Frederick Lawrence (1873–1940) was a local antiquarian who documented much of the early history of Middlewich, and also discovered a Neolithic stone celt whilst digging in the town. John Wright Oakes (1820–1887) born at Sproston House, was a landscape painter who exhibited regularly at the Royal Academy. Craig McDean (born 1964) is a British fashion photographer who was born in the town and is now based in New York City.

James Hargreaves (1834–1915) was a chemist and inventor, who, along with Thomas Bird, developed a process for the electrolysis of brine using asbestos diaphragms. In 1899, he became director of the newly opened General Electrolytic Alkali Company at Middlewich.

Jack Wilkinson (1931–1996), also born in the town, was an English footballer for eight years who scored 81 goals in 158 league games.

=== Freedom of Middlewich ===
The following is a list of people who have had freedom of Middlewich and when the freedom was bestowed.

- Janet Chisholm, David Cooke, Ken Kingston (2023)
- Linda Boden, Jean Eaton (later stripped of the honour), Poppy Maskill (2024)

== See also ==
- Listed buildings in Middlewich
- Middlewich Manor
