= Charles B. Lawrence (artist) =

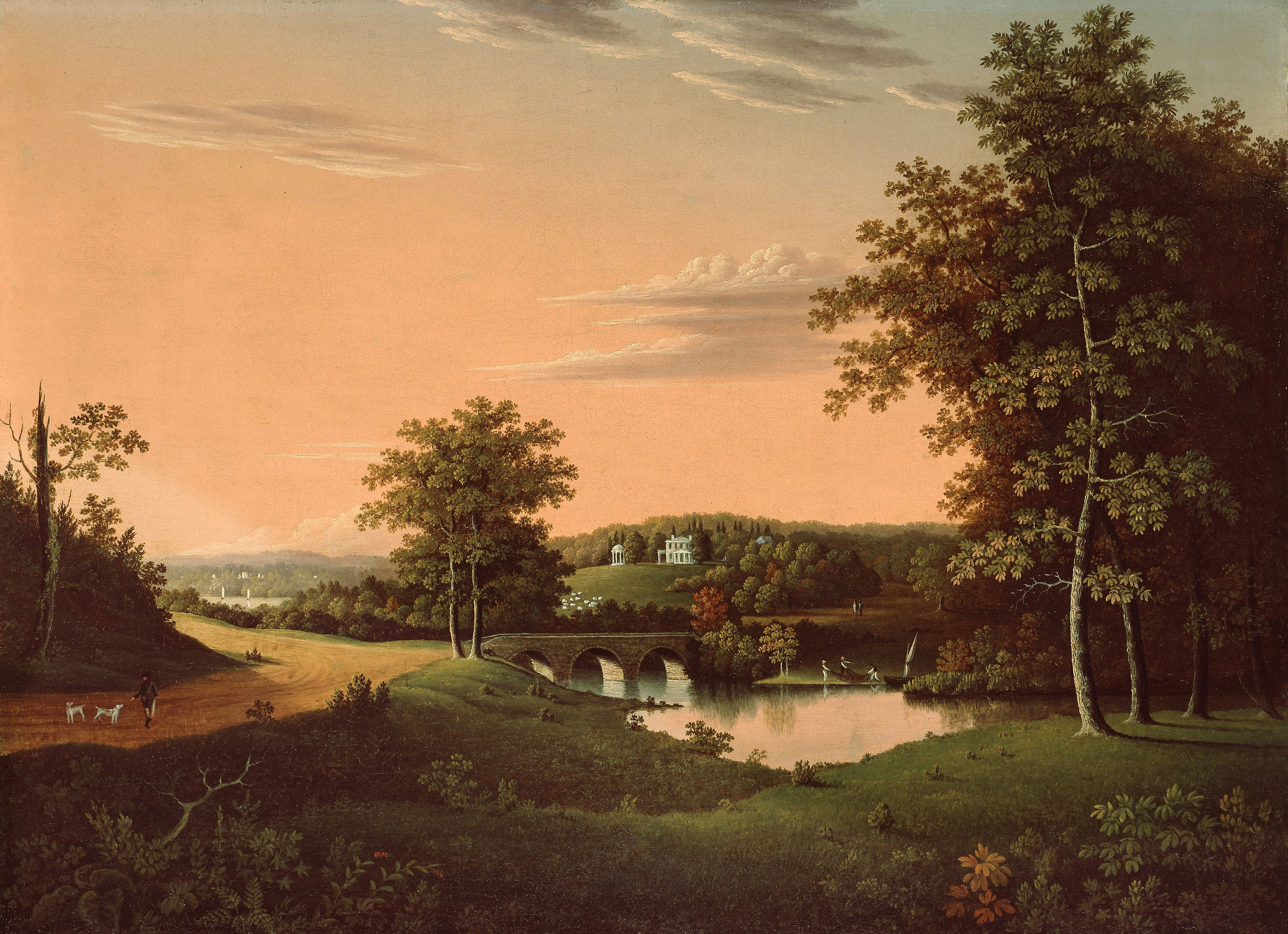
Point Breeze, the estate belonging to Joseph Napoleon Bonaparte near Bordentown

Charles B. Lawrence (c. 1790, Bordentown, New Jersey – 1864, Philadelphia (?)) (Charles Bird Lawrence) was an American painter; primarily of portraits and landscapes. He also produced copies of popular paintings by other artists.

== Biography ==
He is said to have studied with Gilbert Stuart and Rembrandt Peale. His first known paintings were of Bordentown. One was published as an engraving in an issue of The Port Folio in 1816.

Between 1813 and 1837, he worked in Philadelphia and exhibited at the Pennsylvania Academy of Fine Arts. He appears to have given up painting after that time.
