= USS Charles Lawrence =

Buckley-class destroyer escort

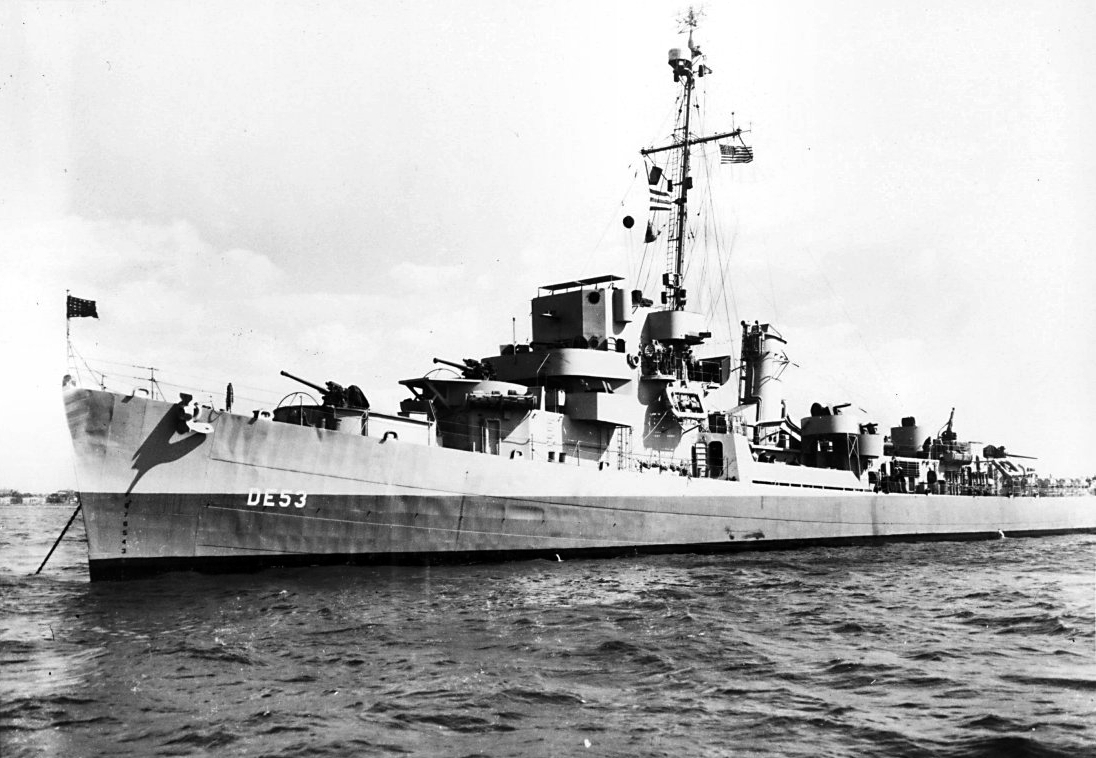

History

United States
- Name: USS Charles Lawrence
- Awarded: 10 February 1942
- Builder: Bethlehem Hingham Shipyard
- Laid down: 1 August 1942
- Launched: 16 February 1943
- Commissioned: 31 May 1943
- Decommissioned: 21 June 1946
- Reclassified: APD-37, 23 October 1944
- Stricken: 1 September 1964
- Honors and awards: 1 battle star (World War II)
- Fate: Sold for scrap, 17 November 1965

General characteristics
- Class & type: Buckley-class destroyer escort
- Displacement: 1,400 long tons (1,422 t) light; 1,740 long tons (1,768 t) standard
- Length: 306 ft (93 m)
- Beam: 37 ft (11 m)
- Draft: 9 ft 6 in (2.90 m) standard; 11 ft 3 in (3.43 m) full load
- Propulsion: 2 × boilers; General Electric turbo-electric drive; 12,000 shp (8.9 MW); 2 × solid manganese-bronze 3,600 lb (1,600 kg) 3-bladed propellers, 8 ft 6 in (2.59 m) diameter, 7 ft 7 in (2.31 m) pitch; 2 × rudders; 359 tons fuel oil
- Speed: 23 knots (43 km/h; 26 mph)
- Range: 3,700 nmi (6,900 km) at 15 kn (28 km/h; 17 mph); 6,000 nmi (11,000 km) at 12 kn (22 km/h; 14 mph)
- Complement: 15 officers, 198 men
- Armament: 3 × 3-inch/50-caliber guns; 1 × quad 1.1-inch/75-caliber gun; 8 × single 20 mm guns; 1 × triple 21 inch (533 mm) torpedo tubes; 1 × Hedgehog anti-submarine mortar; 8 × K-gun depth charge projectors; 2 × depth charge tracks

USS Charles Lawrence (DE-53) was a Buckley-class destroyer escort of the United States Navy, commissioned in 1943. She was converted to a high-speed transport in 1944 and redesignated APD-37. After being decommissioned in 1946, she was finally scrapped in 1965.

== History ==
USS Charles Lawrence was named in honor of Ordnanceman Charles Lawrence (29 December 1916–7 December 1941), who was killed in action during the Japanese attack on Pearl Harbor 7 December 1941.

Charles Lawrence was laid down on 1 August 1942 at the Bethlehem-Hingham Shipyard, Inc., in Hingham, Massachusetts, launched on 16 February 1943, sponsored by Mrs S. Lawrence and commissioned on 31 May 1943.

=== Battle of the Atlantic ===
Assigned first to escort central Atlantic convoys of tankers between Norfolk, Virginia, and Casablanca, Charles Lawrence made one such voyage between 16 August and 24 September 1943. She was then transferred to the high-speed tanker convoys formed at New York City from ships which had sailed independently up the east coast, now swept of the submarine menace, from West Indian oil ports. Between 13 October 1943 and 23 September 1944, Charles Lawrence escorted eight such convoys to Northern Ireland, returning with the tankers in ballast to New York. These convoys only lost one tanker in their passages. Along with the constant alertness against submarine attack, Charles Lawrence maintained a high standard of seamanship to keep the seas in all kinds of weather. At one time, during what was known as the "Christmas Hurricane" of 1943, the ships of her convoy were virtually hove-to for 20 hours.

=== Pacific War ===
Charles Lawrence was reclassified APD-37 on 23 October 1944, and was converted to a high-speed transport at Sullivan Drydock and Repair Corporation in Brooklyn, New York City, and became the name ship of the class. After a brief shakedown, she cleared Norfolk, Virginia, on 27 January 1945 for Pearl Harbor, where she replenished between 22 February and 5 March. She was routed on to Ulithi, where she arrived on 23 March to join the Northern Attack Force Screen for the assault on Okinawa.

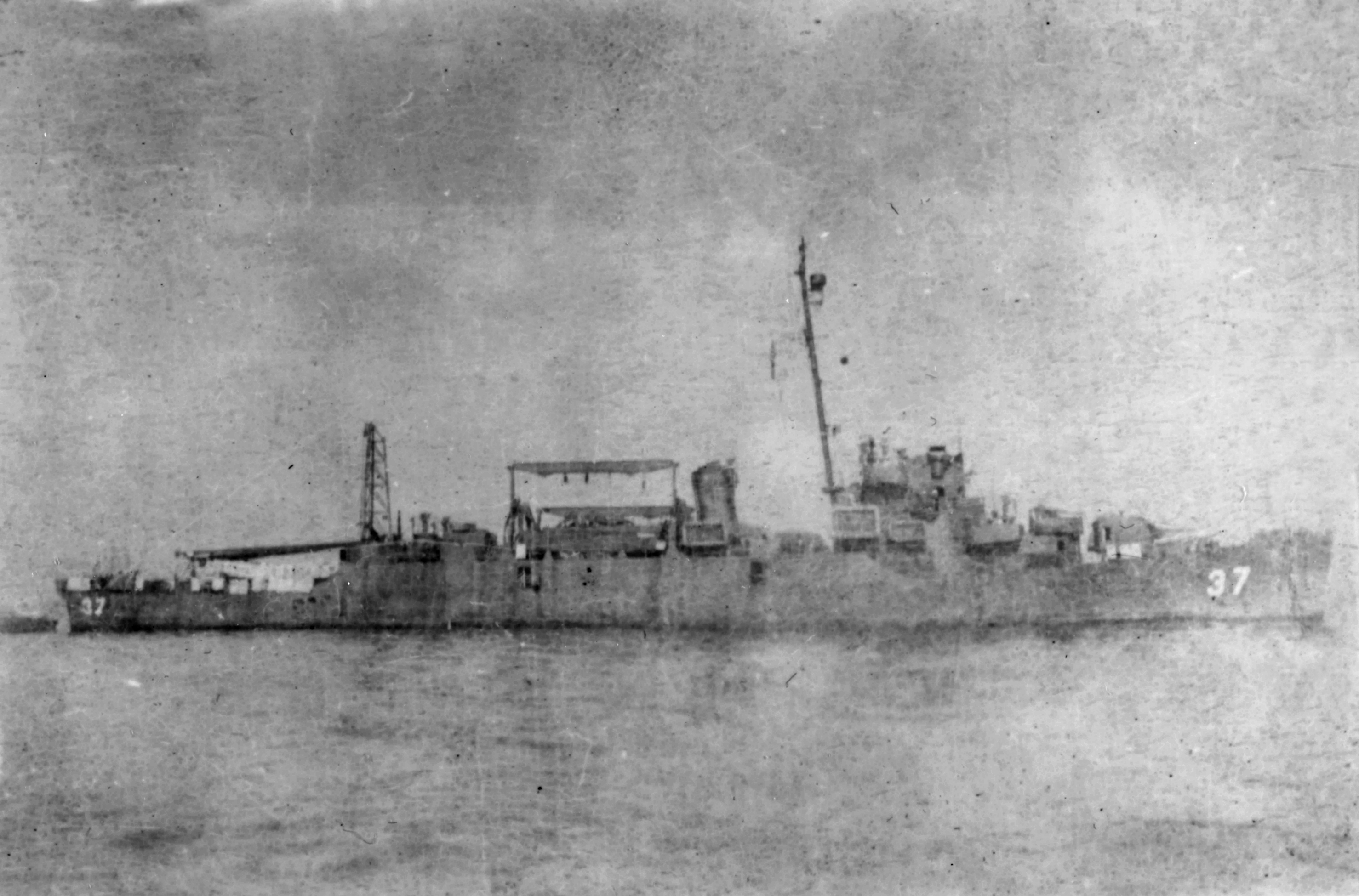
Charles Lawrence after her conversion, in 1945.

Charles Lawrence arrived off the Hagushi beaches on 1 April 1945, in the screen for a group of 20 transports. She remained close inshore to guard the launching of the initial assault waves, then moved out to sea to take her place on the semi-circular screen around the transport area. For three months, she continued to patrol off Okinawa, guarding against attack by suicide boats, aircraft or submarines. The only interruptions to this vigil came when she was ordered to escort shipping away from the island to ports in the Philippines, Marianas, and Carolines.

After the war, Charles Lawrence covered the landing of occupation forces in the Inland Sea, then acted as transport between the Philippines and Manus. She returned to San Diego on 16 December 1945, and to Norfolk, Virginia, on 30 December. On 21 June 1946 she was decommissioned, in reserve at Green Cove Springs, Florida. She was sold for scrap in 1965.

== Awards ==
Charles Lawrence received one battle star for World War II service.
