= Sutton, Middlewich =

Hamlet in Cheshire, England

Coordinates: 53.175°N 2.451°W

Sutton
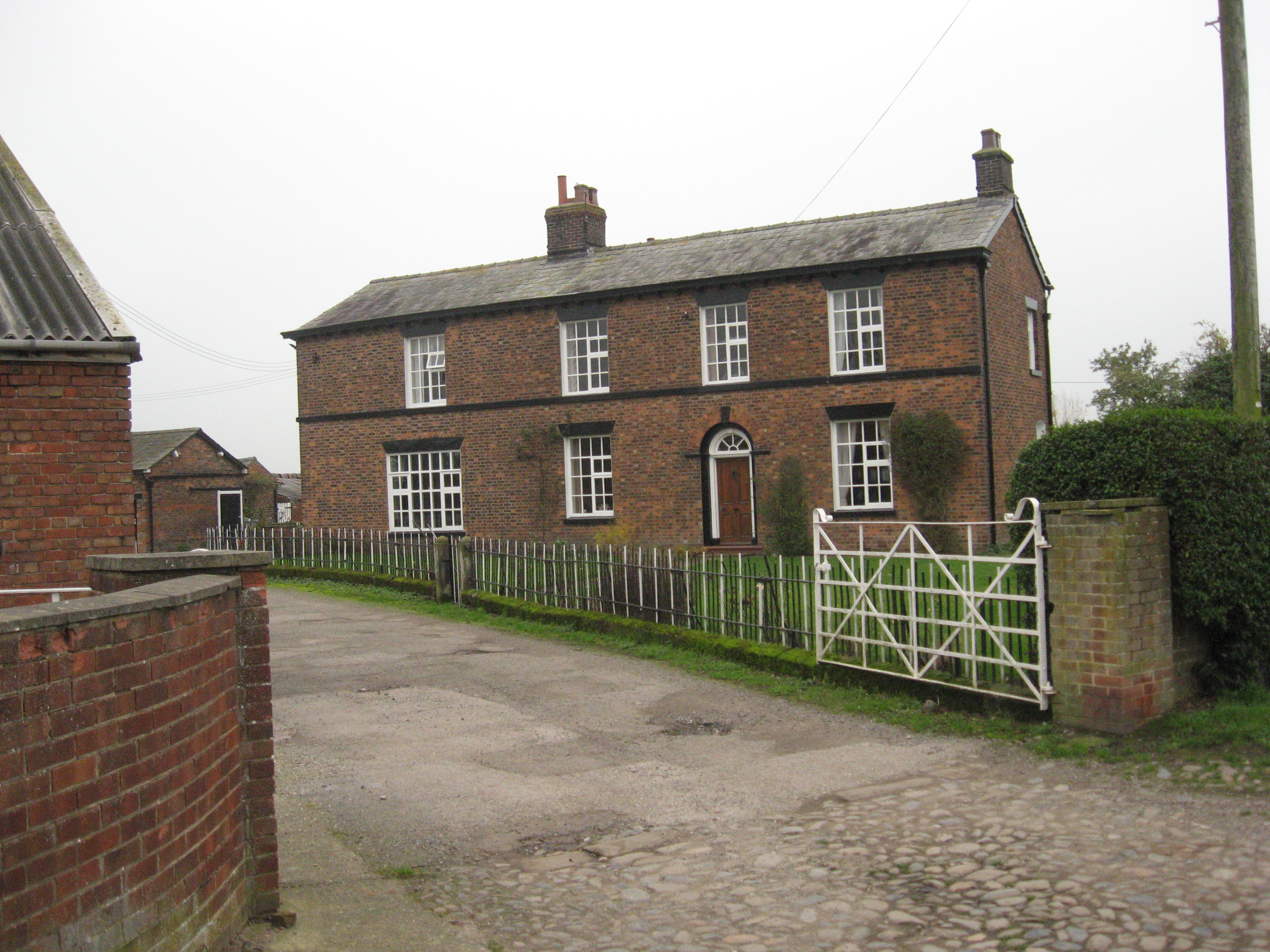
- Sutton Hall farmhouse in Sutton (2011)

- Location within Cheshire
- Civil parish: Middlewich
- Unitary authority: Cheshire West and Chester
- Ceremonial county: Cheshire
- Region: North West
- Country: England
- Sovereign state: United Kingdom

Sutton was a hamlet near to Middlewich in Cheshire, England.

== History ==
Sutton was formerly a township in the parish of Middlewich, in 1866 Sutton became a separate civil parish, on 25 March 1892 the parish was abolished and merged with Newton. In 1881 the parish had a population of 32. From 1974 to 2009 it was in Congleton district when it became part of Cheshire West and Chester.
