= William Vaughan (Royalist) =

Sir William Vaughan
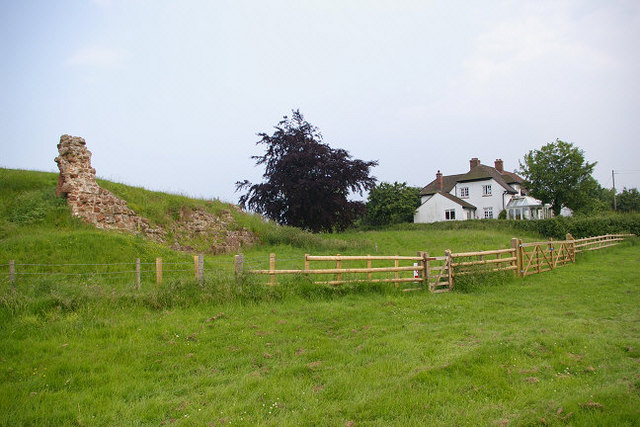
- Remains of Shrawardine Castle, held by Vaughan for the Royalists during 1644-5
- Born: c.1585 possibly Wales
- Died: 2 August 1649; Rathmines
- Military career
- Allegiance: Royalists
- Branch: Cavalry
- Service years: 1640s
- Rank: Major General
- Nickname: "The Devil of Shrawardine"
- Conflicts: First English Civil War; Battle of Marston Moor; Relief of Montgomery Castle; Battle of Naseby; Battle of Rowton Heath; Battle of Denbigh Green; Battle of Stow-on-the-Wold; Irish Confederate Wars; Battle of Rathconnell; Battle of Rathmines †

Sir William Vaughan (died 1649) was a cavalry officer in the armies of Charles I of England. Initially serving in Ireland during the Confederate Wars, the outbreak of the First English Civil War led to him being sent to England in 1644, at the head of an Anglo-Irish cavalry regiment, to reinforce the Royalist army.

Appointed General of Horse for the area of Wales and the Marches, he was involved in a large number of battles and skirmishes in the north and west, including the defeat of the last Royalist field army at Stow, where he was wounded but escaped capture.

Vaughan subsequently rejoined Royalist forces in Ireland, where he was killed at the Battle of Rathmines.

== Life ==
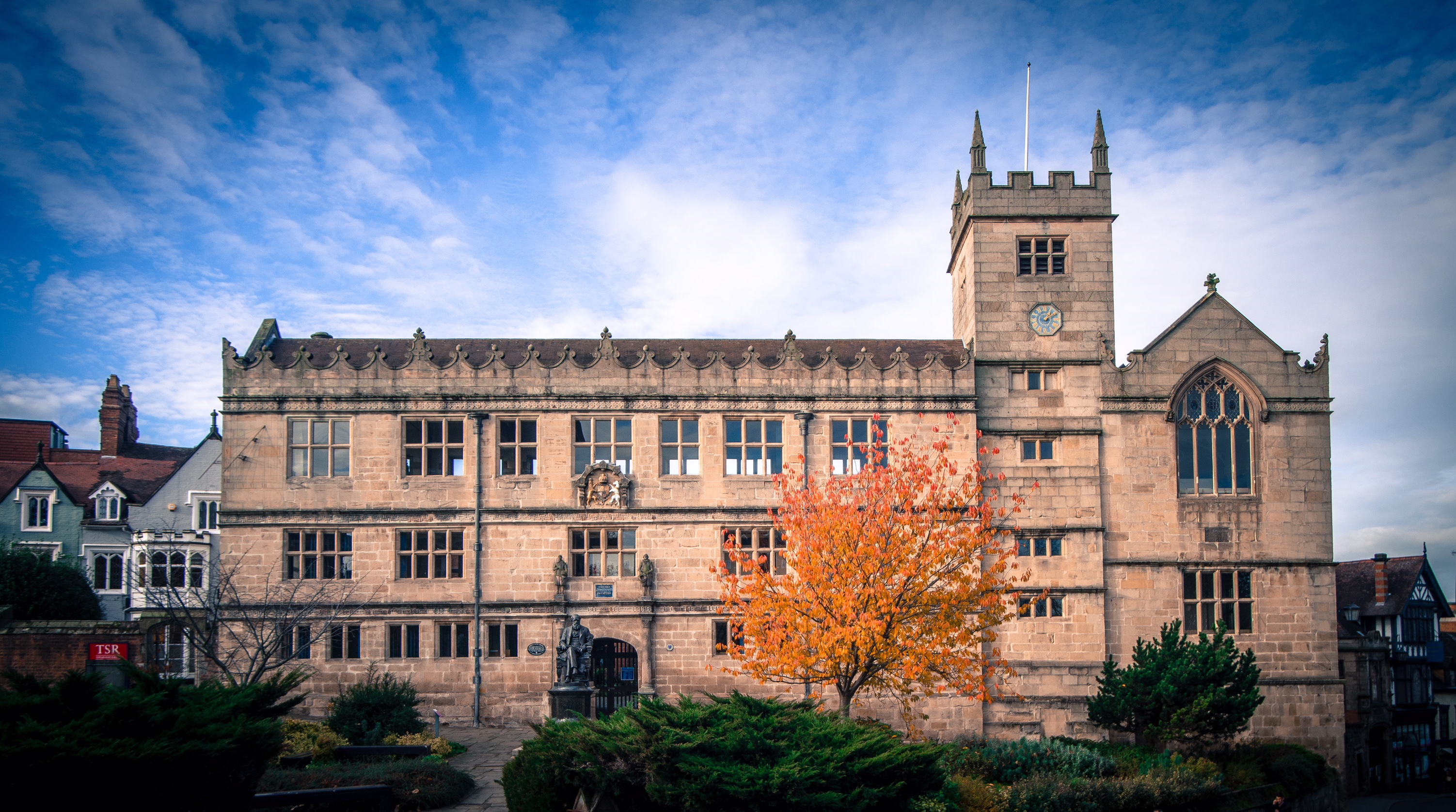
The original buildings of Shrewsbury School; Vaughan was probably admitted here in 1596

Almost nothing is known of Vaughan's early life, though he is often supposed to have been a member of one of the several landowning Vaughan families of Shropshire or Herefordshire. He is usually identified as the William Vaughan who was admitted to Shrewsbury School in 1596, based on a note by a later school headmaster Thomas Challoner, which would suggest his birth date was around 1585. He had at least two brothers: Charles, a parson, and James, noted as a captain in William's regiment in 1645; records suggest the three were nephews of Sir John Vaughan, a Welsh associate of Lord Docwra who came to Ireland in 1599 before becoming governor of Derry.

Having previously served on the Continent, by 1643 Vaughan had joined the forces of Charles I fighting the Confederate rebels in Ireland; he was knighted by the Lords Justices for his service under Grenville at the Battle of Rathconnell in February. At the end of January 1644 the Royalist commander Ormonde gave him a cavalry regiment originally intended for Sir Thomas Lucas and sent them to England. Landing at Neston, Vaughan's regiment joined Byron's Royalist forces at Chester and on 25 March Vaughan and Colonel Ellice defeated local Parliamentarian commander Thomas Mytton in a skirmish at Lilleshall.

Following a further cavalry skirmish at Much Wenlock on 9 May, Vaughan's regiment joined the Royalist campaign to relieve the besieged city of York, which ended with their defeat at Marston Moor on 2 July. In September Byron, Vaughan and Sir Michael Ernely attempted to recapture Montgomery, which had been surrendered to Mytton by Lord Herbert of Cherbury; Vaughan advanced from Shrewsbury to attack a force under Thomas Myddelton. The subsequent destruction of much of Byron's army at Montgomery put the Royalist garrisons across Wales on the defensive, hampering their ability to contribute to the wider conflict.

Later the same month Vaughan was made governor of Shrawardine Castle in Shropshire, with his brother Charles as deputy governor. In October he was taken prisoner by a party led by Mytton, supposedly while receiving the sacrament on his knees in Shrawardine church; the Parliamentarian newspaper Perfect Occurrences reported that when Mytton allowed Vaughan back into the castle to negotiate a surrender, he had the drawbridge raised and escaped, "so little trust is there in their words". Vaughan, who was given the nickname "the Devil of Shrawardine" according to the Royalist news-sheet Mercurius Aulicus, used his regiment to man the Shropshire garrisons of High Ercall Hall, Lilleshall Abbey, Dawley and Caus Castle during the winter of 1644–5. However, by this time Royalist control of the county was beginning to unravel, partly due to their policy of requisitioning supplies locally; clubmen were operating in the south of Shropshire by the end of 1644, while Bridgnorth refused to admit a Royalist force and Much Wenlock to supply food.

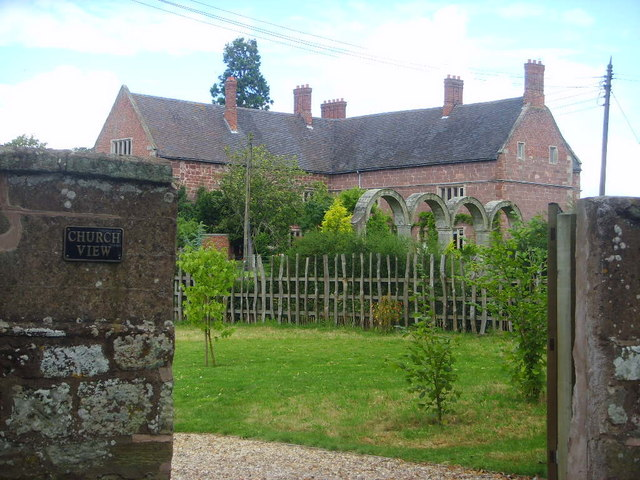
High Ercall Hall; held by a detachment from Vaughan's regiment under Captain Nicholas Armorer, it is typical of the small garrisons held by the Royalists in Shropshire

Vaughan was defeated by Cromwell on 27 April in a cavalry skirmish at Bampton-in-the-Bush in Oxfordshire. He linked up with Charles's main field army at Newport, Shropshire or Evesham in May, and took part in the cavalry charge in the critical Royalist defeat at Naseby on 14 June. He then fell back on Shropshire, fighting two minor actions on 4–5 July to relieve the garrison at High Ercall. After rejoining Charles in the Welsh Marches Vaughan accompanied him to Newark, where Charles appointed him Royalist general of horse in Wales, Shropshire, Worcestershire, Staffordshire, and Herefordshire.

Vaughan returned to Denbighshire to organise an attempt to relieve Chester, vital to maintain links with Royalists in Ireland and then besieged by Sir William Brereton. This resulted in the Battle of Rowton Heath in September, where Vaughan commanded a brigade of 1,000 cavalry; the Royalist defeat there ended Charles's hopes of lifting the siege. Vaughan was ordered to Wales to rebuild a relief force, but on 1 November was attacked and defeated by Mytton and Colonel Michael Jones at Denbigh Green. His routed horse made their way to Knighton, Radnorshire, where on 13 November the party broke up. Early in December he received orders to renew the attempt to relieve Chester and began efforts to reinforce his troops, mainly in the area around Leominster and Ludlow.

In January 1646 Vaughan joined his remaining men with those of Jacob Astley. On 22 March Vaughan and Astley's forces, the last effective Royalist field army, were completely broken up at the battle of Stow-on-the-Wold in Gloucestershire by Brereton; Vaughan was wounded, but escaped.

With the war at an end, Vaughan joined other Royalist exiles at The Hague. In November 1648 Prince Rupert gave him the command of a ship, which he probably used to rejoin the Royalists still fighting in Ireland. In Ireland he was appointed major-general of horse under Ormonde, but was killed while leading a counter-charge against Michael Jones at the Battle of Rathmines on 2 August 1649, dying "bravely at the head of his men".

On 8 October 1651 his brother and administrator Rev. Charles Vaughan was granted permission to compound for his estate.
