= Battle of Denbigh Green =

Site of a battle during the English Civil War, in Wales

- Part of the First English Civil War
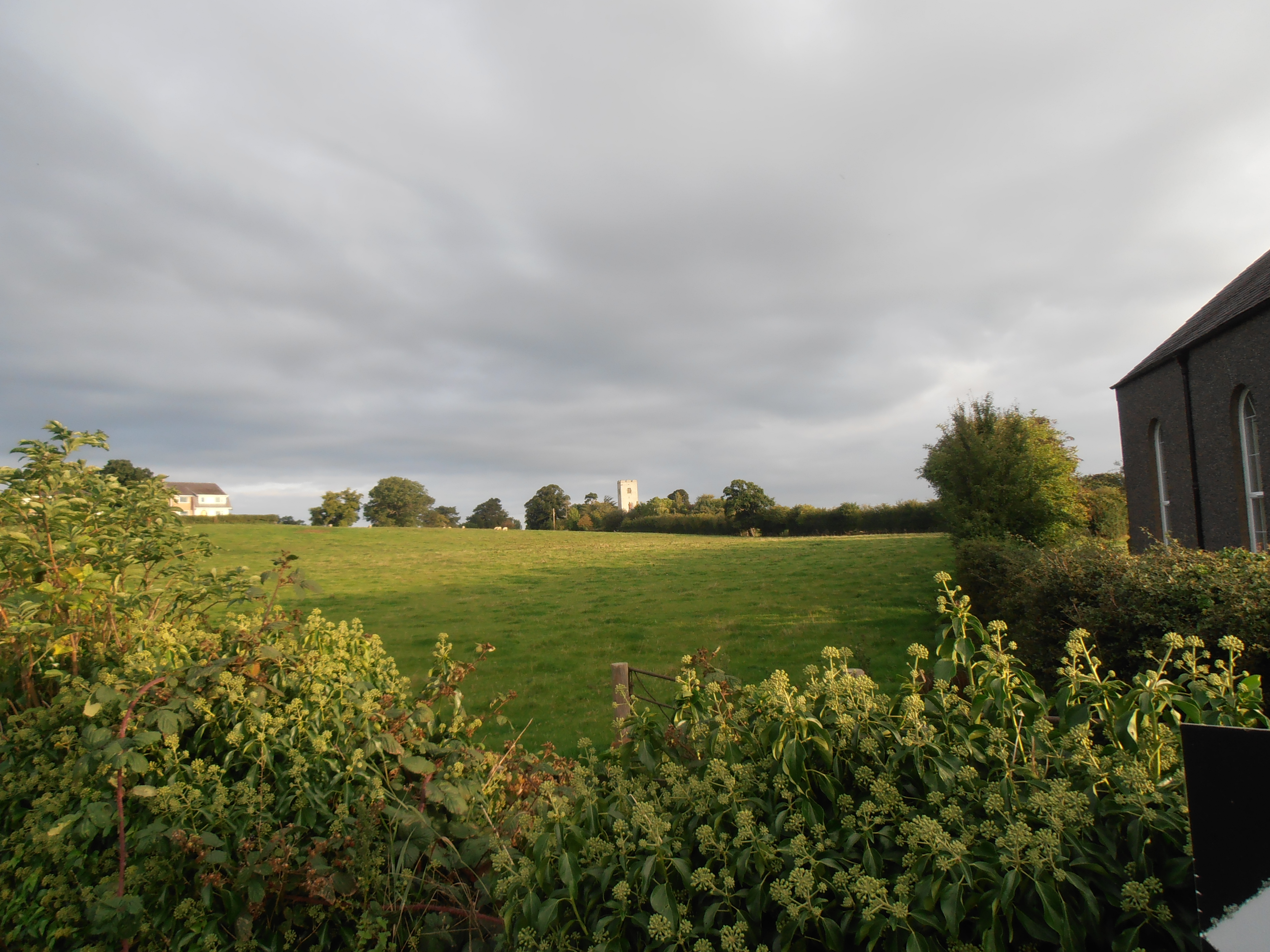
- St Marcella's Church, also known as Whitchurch or Yr Eglwys Wen, which stood on Denbigh Green
Date	1 November 1645
Location	Denbigh Green, Denbigh, Wales 53°11′06″N 3°23′27″W
Result	Parliamentarian victory

Belligerents
Royalists	Parliamentarians

Commanders and leaders
William Vaughan	Thomas Mytton; Michael Jones

Strength
280–400 foot; 700–1,100 horse	1,000–1,500 foot; 1,500 horse

Casualties and losses
100 killed 400 captured	Unknown

The Battle of Denbigh Green (1 November 1645) took place during the closing stages of the First English Civil War. Fought just outside the Royalist garrison of Denbigh, it has been described as probably the only action in the North Wales theatre of the war "meriting the description of battle".

In a last-ditch attempt to relieve the strategic port of Chester, Royalist cavalry commander Sir William Vaughan ordered the mustering of around 2,000 men, drawn from garrisons across Shropshire and north-east Wales, at Denbigh Green. Before gathering all his forces he was attacked by a larger Parliamentarian force under Thomas Mytton and Michael Jones; after a hard-fought action, the Royalists were routed and dispersed.

== Background ==
=== Strategic situation ===
The last substantial Royalist field army was destroyed at Naseby in June 1645. Following a failed attempt to link up with Royalists in Scotland, and with his supporters increasingly confined to a series of small garrisons in the West of England and Wales, Charles I pinned his hopes on reinforcement from Ireland. This required holding the strategic port of Chester, where Lord Byron's garrison had been intermittently blockaded since December 1644.

The siege resumed in earnest in September under Sir William Brereton. A Royalist attempt to relieve the city was defeated on 24 September at Rowton Heath, following which Charles ordered Sir William Vaughan, an experienced cavalryman who had served in Ireland until 1644, to return to Wales with the remains of his brigade and gather forces for another relief attempt.

=== Royalists gather ===
Vaughan hurriedly began to assemble men at Ludlow from a variety of garrisons, including Ludlow itself, Bridgnorth and High Ercall. His force eventually included remnants of at least ten regiments, though the collapse in Royalist supply lines meant they were poorly armed: it was reported that of the cavalry "scarce a tenth man hath a pistol". By mid-October he had potentially 2,000–3,000 horse available, and issued an order for a general rendezvous with the foot within sight of Salesbury's Royalist garrison at Denbigh Castle.

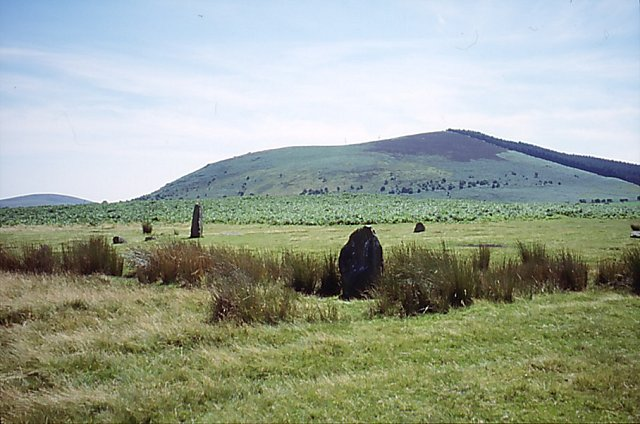
Vaughan's force was seen marching north near Corndon Hill.

Vaughan's forces and their probable destination were reported to Brereton as they marched north over Corndon Hill. He ordered 1,500 horse and a similar number of infantry detached from the siege of Chester to engage them, under Colonel Michael Jones and Adjutant-General James Lothian. Jones reached Ruthin on 30 October, where Thomas Mytton, the Parliamentarian commander for North Wales, assumed overall command.

Vaughan's attempt to relieve Chester, October–November 1645; key locations

Vaughan's advance guard had reached Chirk Castle, where they picked up a few additional infantry, on the morning of 23 October, Vaughan himself arriving by 26th. By 31 October, Vaughan was encamped on Denbigh Green, an open four-mile tract of commonland outside the town, where he received news Mytton had left Ruthin. Most forces ordered to the rendezvous from the North Wales garrisons had yet to arrive and diarist Richard Symonds, a volunteer with Vaughan, counted the Royalist cavalry at just 700, although this may have been exclusive of several hundred lightly armed Irish. Despite the option of withdrawing to the Royalist stronghold of Rhuddlan, Vaughan chose to stand and fight - a "suicidal" decision given the odds.

The alarm was sounded for Mytton's approach along the Ruthin road at noon the following day. Vaughan positioned his musketeers and dragoons along the roadside hedges near the church of St. Marcella, or "Whitchurch", while the main body of cavalry were drawn up on open ground to the west of the road; Mytton responded by detaching a "forlorn hope" of 40 musketeers to precede his advance guard.

== The battle ==
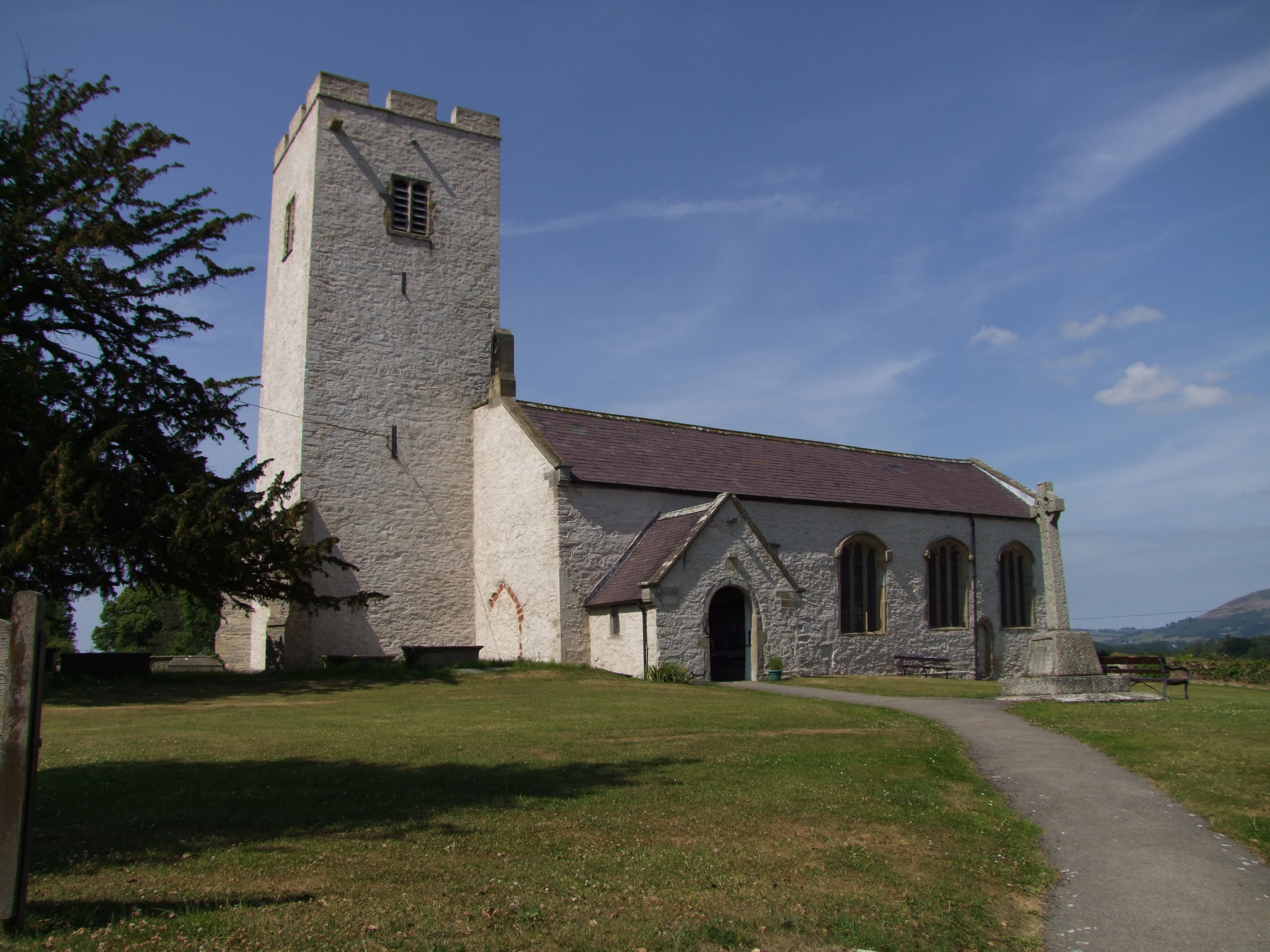
St Marcella's Church was where the initial fighting took place.

The battle opened with Mytton's forlorn hope and advance guard attempting to dislodge Vaughan's men from the hedges at Whitchurch. Symonds noted that "their approach was handsomely disputed by our horse and foot above an howre in the hedges and lane".

Finding that his men "could not breake in upon them, but trifled out the time", Mytton left his advance guard in place while making a flanking manoeuvre with the rest of his forces. This involved a "laborious detour" of several miles to reach the Green, but resulted in Vaughan pulling back some of his men to face the new threat. Dislodged from their defensive positions, the Royalist infantry broke and fled towards Denbigh castle. Salesbury later wrote to Vaughan "On your Foot being perceived under the Castle wall, I received them in [...] their valour and good service withall meriting my compassion".

Mytton brought forward the Warwick and Derbyshire Horse, who charged the Royalist cavalry. Vaughan managed to reform them around two miles from the church on Denbigh Green, where they were charged again. Some dragoons of the High Ercall garrison, supported by troopers of Prince Maurice's Lifeguard, countercharged and briefly checked Mytton's advance, but following a third charge the Royalists broke.

The pursuit of the defeated cavalry went on over 8 miles; over 100 Royalists were killed and 400 captured, and the remainder broken up into scattered groups. One party was finally brought to bay at Llangernyw, where the dead were interred in a mass grave in the churchyard. Vaughan and a large group reached Llanrwst before quartering at Gwydir, home of Richard Wynn, which they pillaged.

In the interim Mytton occupied the town of Denbigh, though lacking siege equipment he could not take the castle; Salesbury was to continue to hold out until October 1646. With his objective of scattering Vaughan's force completed, Mytton retired to continue the siege of Chester.

== Aftermath ==
After Mytton's departure Vaughan regrouped at Denbigh, where he was rejoined by his infantry, before retreating southwards. Symonds recorded that they reached Newtown by 10 November and Knighton, "a pretty towne", the next day. On 12th the group broke up, "Prince M[aurice's] guards to Bewdley, Bridgnorth horse thither, the rest with Sir William V. to Lemster".

Vaughan was to make one final attempt to rebuild a relief force for Chester, but with supplies exhausted Byron was to capitulate in January 1646. Vaughan instead combined his remaining men with those of Jacob Astley; this last effective Royalist field army was eventually destroyed at Stow-on-the-Wold in March.

== Sources ==
- Barratt, John (2000). Cavaliers: the Royalist Army at War 1642-1646. Sutton.
- Clark, David (2010). The English Civil War. Pocket Essentials.
- Dore, Robert, ed. (1990). The Letter Books of Sir William Brereton, Volume 2. Record Society of Lancashire and Cheshire.
- Mangianello, Norman (2004). Concise Encyclopedia of the Revolutions and Wars of England, Scotland, and Ireland, 1639-1660. Scarecrow.
- Owen, Leonard (1962). "A Seventeenth Century Commonplace Book". Transactions of the Honourable Society of Cymmrodorion (Session 1962).
- Symonds, Richard (1859). Diary of the Marches of the Royal Army During the Great Civil War. Camden Society.
- Tucker, Norman (1958). North Wales in the Civil War. Gee.
- Williams, John (1836). Ancient and Modern Denbigh. J. Williams.
- Worden, Blair (2012). God's Instruments: Political Conduct in the England of Oliver Cromwell. OUP.
