= Theophilus Jones (soldier) =

Irish soldier & official (c.1606/10–1685

Sir Theophilus Jones MP, JP
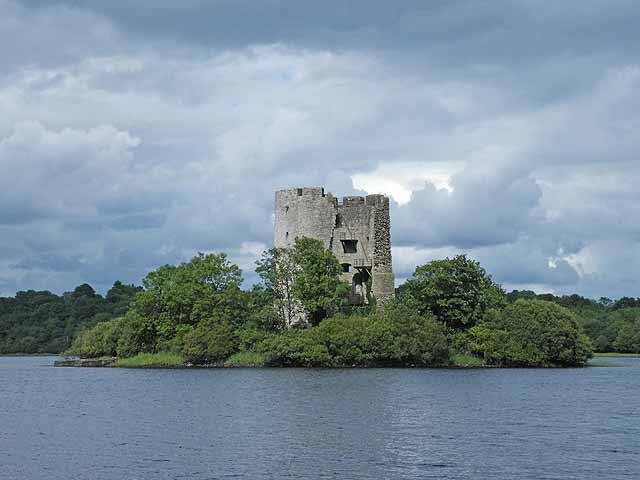
- Cloughoughter Castle, which surrendered to Jones in the final action of the Irish War

Privy Council of Ireland
- In office 1661–1685

Scoutmaster General
- In office 1661–1685

Member of the Irish Parliament for County Meath
- In office May 1661 – April 1666

Member of the Third Protectorate Parliament for County of Dublin
- In office January 1659 – April 1659

Member of the Second Protectorate Parliament for Westmeath, Longford, and King's County
- In office September 1656 – February 1658

Personal details
- Born: circa 1606 to 1610
- Died: 2 January 1685 Osbertstown, County Kildare
- Resting place: Naas, County Kildare
- Spouse: Alicia Ussher (1625–1690)
- Relations: Henry; Michael; Ambrose; Oliver
- Children: Arthur; Judith; Mabella
- Parent(s): Lewis Jones; Mabel Ussher
- Occupation: Politician and soldier

Military service
- Allegiance: Royalist; Commonwealth
- Years of service: 1641 to 1653
- Rank: Lieutenant-Colonel
- Unit: Lieutenant-General Ludlow's regiment
- Commands: Governor of Lisburn 1644–1646
- Battles/wars: Irish Confederate Wars; Benburb; Rathmines; Scarrifholis; Lisnagarvey; Cloughoughter Castle

Sir Theophilus Jones, (circa 1606–1610 to 1685) was an Irish soldier and government official of Welsh descent. One of five sons born to Lewis Jones, Bishop of Killaloe in the Church of Ireland, he formed part of a close-knit and powerful Protestant family.

A grandson of James Ussher, head of the Church of Ireland from 1625 to 1656, in 1648 he married his cousin Alicia Ussher, another of his grandchildren. Of his four brothers, Henry and Ambrose were also bishops in the Church of Ireland, while Michael and Oliver were senior soldiers and politicians.

Little is known of his career prior to the Irish Rebellion of 1641 when he fought in the Irish Confederate Wars, first with the Earl of Ormonde's Royal Irish Army, then later under Oliver Cromwell. When Ireland was part of the Commonwealth of England from 1653 to 1660, he sat as MP in the Second and Third Protectorate Parliaments. Prior to The Restoration in 1660, he and his brother Henry were instrumental in securing Ireland for Charles II and he participated in the Irish Convention.

In return, he was appointed to the Privy Council of Ireland, made Clerk of the Pells in the Exchequer of Ireland, Scoutmaster of Ireland and elected for County Meath in the 1661 to 1666 Parliament of Ireland. He largely withdrew from public life after 1664 and died in Osbertstown, County Kildare on 2 January 1685.

== Personal life ==
Theophilus Jones was born sometime between 1606 and 1610, probably in Ardagh, County Longford, third of five sons of Lewis Jones (1560–1646), a Welsh priest who joined the Church of Ireland in 1605 and became Bishop of Killaloe in 1633. His mother Mabel was sister to James Ussher, head of the church from 1625 to 1656, while his brothers Henry (1605–1681) and Ambrose (died 1678), also became bishops. His other brothers, Michael (ca 1606/1610–1649) and Oliver (ca 1612–1664), were soldiers and politicians.

In 1648, he married Alicia Ussher (1625–1690), daughter of Sir Arthur Ussher; they had at least three children who survived to adulthood, Arthur, Judith and Mabella. His daughter Judith married Francis Butler (1634–1702), Member of Parliament for Belturbet from 1661 to 1666.

== Career ==
=== Irish Confederate Wars; 1641 to 1653 ===
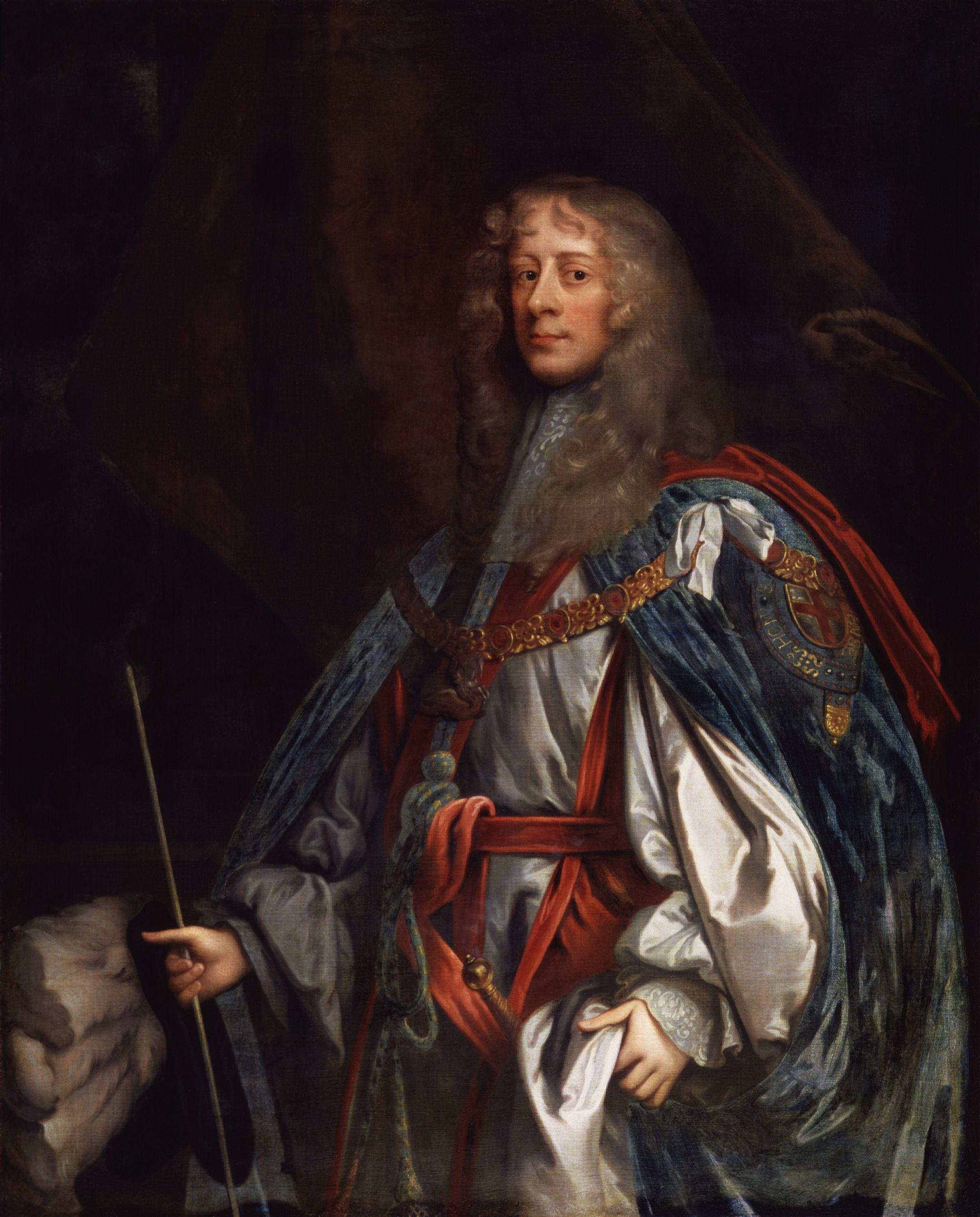
The Earl of Ormond, Royalist commander who dominated Irish politics for much of the 17th century

Almost nothing is known of Jones' career prior to the outbreak of the Irish Rebellion in October 1641; like his brothers Michael and Oliver, he joined the Royal Army raised to suppress it, commanded by the Earl of Ormond. His brother Henry was taken prisoner at the family home in Ballinagh; released in December, he prepared a report of alleged Catholic atrocities, titled "A remonstrance of divers remarkable passages concerning the church and kingdom of Ireland". Later published by the Parliament of England, it played a key role in shaping English and Protestant views of the rebellion.

In December 1641, Theophilus was appointed captain in Lord Edward Conway's regiment, an infantry unit raised in Ulster. Ormond's forces in the north were supported by Scots Covenanters under Alexander Leslie, who captured Dungannon in September 1642; Jones was appointed garrison commander before the Catholic Confederacy took it back in spring 1643. The outbreak of the First English Civil War in August 1642 meant the Irish Army could no longer receive reinforcements or money from England; by mid-1643, the Confederacy held most of Ireland, apart from Ulster, Dublin and Cork City.

Charles I wanted to use troops from Ireland to defeat his Parliamentarian opponents in England, and in September 1643, Ormond agreed a truce or "Cessation" with the Confederacy. Factions on both sides objected to the terms, which included negotiations on freedom of worship for Catholics and constitutional reforms. In Ulster, it created a three-way contest between Ormond's Royalists, Confederate troops under Gaelic Catholic leader Eoghan Ó Néill, and Presbyterian militia, known as the Laggan Army, supported by Covenanters under Robert Munro, who were allies of Parliament.

Michael Jones was among the Irish troops sent to England and defected to Parliament; although they shared his opposition to the truce, Henry and Theophilus remained loyal to Ormond. In return, Theophilus was knighted in early 1644, while Henry was appointed Bishop of Clogher in 1645. Promoted to Lieutenant-Colonel, Jones was made governor of Lisburn in early 1644. In May, he refused entry to troops led by Munro, appointed Parliamentarian commander in Ulster, but despite refusing to acknowledge orders issued by Parliament the two sides generally co-operated. Jones' regiment was present when Munro was defeated at Benburb in June 1646, although it is not clear whether he was.

Theophilus Jones; 1641–1653 campaigns in the North

The First English Civil War ended a few days later when Charles surrendered, and with his approval Ormond signed an alliance with the Confederation to restore him to the throne. However, non-negotiables for Charles, Ormond and Irish Royalists like Theophilus and his brothers was the supremacy of the Protestant Church of Ireland, and acceptance of land settlements made prior to 1641. As a result, the terms were rejected by Ó Néill, whose estates in Ulster had been confiscated in 1610, and a rebel faction who insisted on Catholicism as the national religion.

Placed in command of Kells, County Antrim, Jones was taken prisoner when it was captured by Ó Néill in December 1646. In June 1647, his brother Michael was appointed Parliamentarian Governor of Dublin in place of Ormond, and the revitalised Protestant army won decisive victories at Dungans Hill and Knocknanauss in August and September 1647. The Confederation now re-opened talks with Ormond, once again opposed by Ó Néill, who agreed a separate truce in August 1648 with Michael Jones; negotiated by Henry Jones, its terms included the release of Theophilus.

Now firmly on the side of Parliament, Theophilus was sent to London in October to raise fresh troops and money and was present at the Execution of Charles I on 30 January. This action led to an alliance between Ormond, the Confederation, the Laggan Army and Munro's Covenanters, with the objective of restoring his son Charles II. In early summer, Theophilus returned to Dublin and took part in the Battle of Rathmines, a decisive victory won by his brother Michael over the Ormond-Confederate alliance. After Oliver Cromwell landed with the main expeditionary force in August, Theophilus was left in Dublin; Michael accompanied Cromwell on his autumn campaign and died of disease in December.

For the next three years, Jones served with Robert Venables in the campaign to subdue Leinster and Ulster, including the battles of Scarrifholis and Lisnagarvey. In April 1653, the last of the rebel leaders in Ulster surrendered to him at Cloughoughter Castle.

=== Post 1653 ===
With hostilities at an end, Jones and his brothers remained active in politics, although both Henry and Ambrose refused to accept the removal of bishops from the Church of Ireland. Scotland and Ireland were made part of the Commonwealth of England, with one unified Parliament and in 1656 he was elected to the Second Protectorate Parliament, representing a combined seat for Westmeath, Longford, and King's counties. He also sat in the short-lived Third Protectorate Parliament in 1659, before falling from favour and joining with Henry, Charles Coote and others in overthrowing the Commonwealth government in Ireland.

Following the Restoration of Charles II in 1660, Jones was appointed to the new Privy Council of Ireland and made Clerk of the Pells in the Exchequer of Ireland. He succeeded his brother Henry as Scoutmaster-General of Ireland in 1661 and represented County Meath in the restored Parliament of Ireland from 1661 to 1666; his brother Oliver was MP for Knocktopher. The diarist Samuel Pepys records having dinner with him in London in September 1661, along with Sir George Ayscue and Sir William Penn, senior officers in the Royal Navy who served in Ireland with Cromwell.

He helped suppress a Presbyterian-backed plot to seize Dublin Castle in 1662, and effectively retired from public life in 1664; thereafter, much of his time was spent on legal battles over Lucan Manor, an estate awarded to him in 1654. This had been confiscated from Patrick Sarsfield, a senior commander in the Confederacy, whose eldest son Wllliam married Mary Croft, sister of Duke of Monmouth, an illegitimate son of Charles II. William used this connection to have the family lands returned in 1674 and Jones was compensated with lands elsewhere.

He died in Osbertstown, County Kildare on 2 January 1685, leaving his property to his son Arthur.

== Sources ==
- BCW. "The Cessation of Arms". BCW Project.
- Brooke-Tyrrell, Alma (1970). "Michael Jones: Governor of Dublin". Dublin Historical Record. 24 (1): 159–172. JSTOR 30103903.
- Clarke, Aidan (2004a). "Jones, Sir Theophilus". Oxford Dictionary of National Biography (online ed.). Oxford University Press. doi:10.1093/ref:odnb/15084. (Subscription, Wikipedia Library access or UK public library membership required.)
- Clarke, Aidan (2004b). "Jones, Henry". Oxford Dictionary of National Biography (online ed.). Oxford University Press. doi:10.1093/ref:odnb/15010. (Subscription, Wikipedia Library access or UK public library membership required.)
- Dodd, Arthur. "JONES, MICHAEL (died 1649), soldier". Dictionary of Welsh Biography. National Library of Wales.
- Dunlop, Robert (1913). Ireland under the commonwealth; being a selection of documents relating to the government of Ireland from 1651 to 1659. Manchester University Press. OCLC 473591132.
- Forkan, Kevin (2005). "Army List of the Ulster British Forces, 1642–1646". Archivium Hibernicum. 59: 51–65. doi:10.2307/40285202. JSTOR 40285202.
- Lodge, John (1754). The Peerage of Ireland, Or, A Genealogical History of the Present Nobility of that Kingdom Volume III. William Johnson.
- MS 87 (1630). Funeral Certificate of Sir Theophilus Jones, Knight, with Arms who died at his house at Osbertstown, Jan. 2, 1684. National Library of Ireland, Genealogical Office.
- Pepys, Samuel (6 September 2004). "Friday 6 September 1661". Pepysdiary.com.
- Royle, Trevor (2004). Civil War: The Wars of the Three Kingdoms 1638–1660. Little Brown. ISBN 978-0-316-86125-0.
- Scott, David (2003). Politics and War in the Three Stuart Kingdoms, 1637-49. Palgrave. ISBN 978-0333658741.
- Wedgwood, C.V. (1958). The King's War, 1641–1647 (1983 ed.). Penguin Classics. ISBN 978-0-14-006991-4.

Commonwealth Parliament

Preceded by Sir Robert King, John Hewson, Henry Cromwell, John Clark, Daniel Hutchinson, Vincent Gookin (as MPs for Ireland)	Member of Parliament for King's County, Longford and Westmeath; 1654–1658; With: Thomas Scot 1654–1655; Henry Owen 1656–1658	Succeeded by The Lord Aungier; Sir Henry Piers
Preceded by John Bysse	Member of Parliament for County Dublin; 1659	Succeeded by Commonwealth Parliament abolished
Parliament of Ireland
Preceded by Sir John Temple; Thomas Ashe; 1642 to 1649	Member of Parliament for County Meath; 1661–1666; With: Sir Robert Forth	Succeeded by Sir William Talbot; Sir Patrick Barnewall
