= Oliver Jones (Irish MP) =

Welsh-Irish politician (??–1664)

Lieutenant Colonel Oliver Jones, M.P. (died 1664) was a Welsh-Irish soldier and politician from an influential Protestant family.

The fourth son of Church of Ireland Bishop Lewis Jones (1542–1646) and the nephew of Primate of All Ireland James Ussher, Oliver Jones' brothers were either Protestant clerics (Henry Jones, Ambrose Jones), soldiers and politicians (Theophilus Jones, Michael Jones), or both – his brother Henry was the Church of Ireland Bishop of Clogher, but also served as Scoutmaster General for Cromwell.

Oliver fought in the Irish Rebellion of 1641 and was promoted to the rank of lieutenant colonel. He was appointed governor of Leighlinbridge in 1651. After the Restoration he was elected to the Parliament of Ireland from Knocktopher in 1661, serving until his death in 1664.

Oliver Jones had at least two children, Rebecca and Ambrose. Rebecca married the Reverend John Congreve of Kilmacow and had several children including Elizabeth, mother of the prominent judge Richard Power, who committed suicide in 1794.
