= Lewis Jones (bishop) =

Welsh priest (1560-1646)

The Right Reverend Lewis Jones
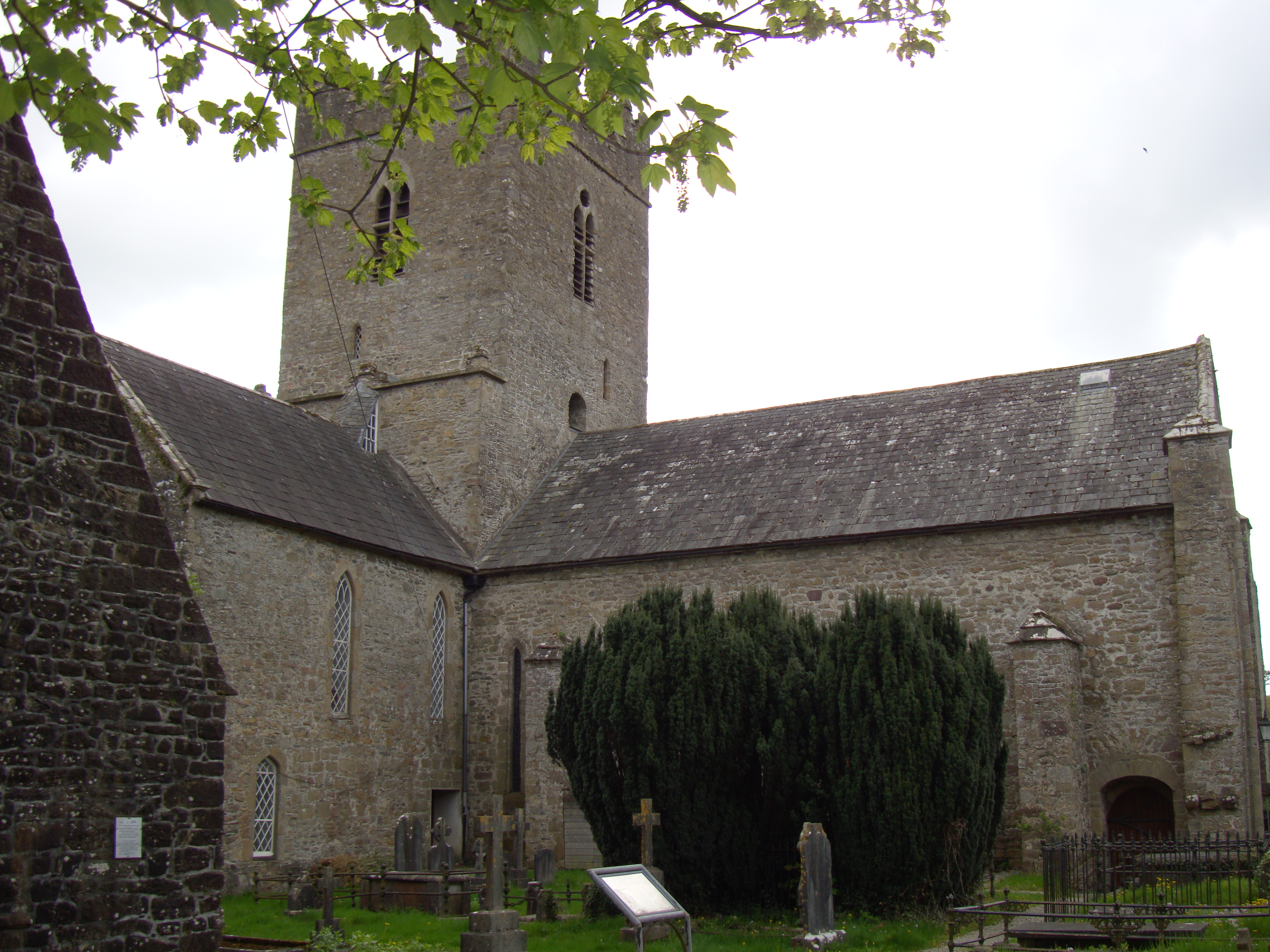
- St Flannans Cathedral, Killaloe
- Church: Church of Ireland
- Diocese: Killaloe
- In office: 1633–1646
- Predecessor: John Rider
- Successor: Edward Parry

Orders
- Consecration: 12 April 1633 by James Ussher

Personal details
- Born: c. 1560 Dol-y-moch, Merionethshire
- Died: 2 November 1646 (aged 86) Dublin, Ireland
- Education: Brasenose College, Oxford

Lewis Jones (c. 1560 – 2 November 1646), was a Welsh priest, who joined the Church of Ireland in 1606, and became Bishop of Killaloe in 1633.

== Biography ==
Jones was educated at Brasenose College at Oxford (Fellowship at All Souls, 1569) and married Mabel Ussher, sister of James Ussher (later Primate of All Ireland) in Ireland c. 1602. Irish historian James Ware claimed he was called "the vivacious Bishop of Killaloe" for having married a young wife at the age of threescore (60). He held several church posts in Ireland, finally becoming Bishop of Killaloe in 1633. His Puritan leanings were deplored by Archbishop Laud, but he remained in office until his death in 1646 at the reputed age of 104. He was buried in St. Werburgh's Church, Dublin.

He was Dean of Ardagh (1606–1625) and Dean of Cashel (1609–1633), when he renovated Cashel Cathedral and instituted a choir there.

Two of his sons were themselves bishops – Henry Jones (1605–1682) and Ambrose Jones (d. 1678). Three other sons, Michael Jones (d. 1649), Oliver Jones (d. 1664), and Theophilus Jones (d. 1685), were soldiers and politicians.

== Disputes ==
A good deal of confusion exists about Jones' career and age. Several writers believe Jones graduated from Brasenose College in 1580, which would correspond to a date given for his age in a letter of Archbishop Laud and make him about 86 at his death. On the other hand, the story of Jones as "the vivacious Bishop" given by James Ware and his editor Walter Harris – in a work supposedly printed by Jones' granddaughters – would argue for the earlier date of graduation. Genealogist Robert Leech, in a 19th-century work on the Jones family, posited that there were several Lewis Joneses active at the time, and the Dean of Ardagh was a different Lewis Jones, the son of Thomas Jones, Archbishop of Dublin.

== Sources ==
- McCafferty, John (2004). "Jones, Lewis". Oxford Dictionary of National Biography (online ed.). Oxford University Press. doi:10.1093/ref:odnb/15059. (Subscription, Wikipedia Library access or UK public library membership required.)
