= Relief of Montgomery Castle =

1644 battle of the First English Civil War

Coordinates: 52.56253°N 3.15061°W

Battle of Montgomery
- Part of First English Civil War
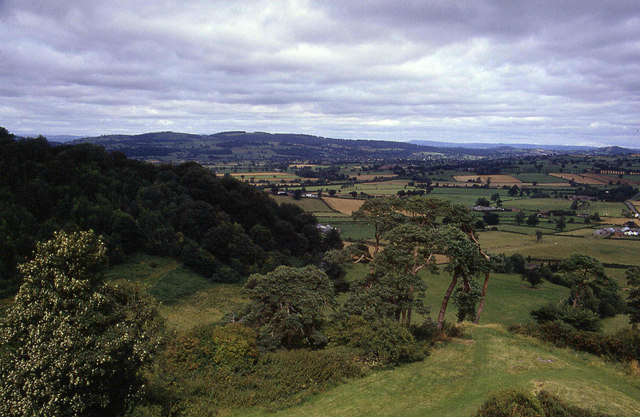
- View north from Montgomery Castle, towards the battlefield (in the level ground)
Date	18 September 1644
Location	Montgomery, Powys
Result	Parliamentarian victory

Belligerents
Royalists	Parliamentarians

Commanders and leaders
Lord Byron	Sir John Meldrum; Colonel Thomas Mytton

Strength
2,800 infantry 1,400 cavalry 300 dragoons	2,000 infantry 1,500 cavalry

Casualties and losses
500 killed 1,500 captured	40

Wales

The Battle of Montgomery took place during the First English Civil War of 1642–1646. On 17 September 1644, a Parliamentarian force commanded by Sir John Meldrum advanced to engage a Royalist army led by Lord Byron which was besieging Montgomery Castle in mid Wales. The battle was fought the next day. After the Royalists gained an initial advantage, the Parliamentarians counter-attacked and destroyed Byron's army.

The Royalists retained a presence in North and Mid Wales after their defeat, but could not again gather a field army in the region until the end of the civil war.

== Prelude ==
The Royalists enjoyed local support in much of Wales. During much of 1643, local Royalist commanders skirmished in the Welsh Marches with Parliamentarian forces based in the Midlands and commanded by Sir Thomas Myddelton and Colonel Thomas Mytton among others. Late in 1643, King Charles attempted to create a field army in North Wales and Cheshire under Lord Byron, using English regiments returned from Ireland following a negotiated armistice with Confederate Ireland, but Byron suffered a setback at the Battle of Nantwich in January 1644.

In the spring of 1644, Prince Rupert, the King's nephew and most popular field commander, established himself at Shrewsbury. In May, he led his own and Byron's armies into Lancashire, on his way to relieve the Siege of York. Myddelton and other Parliamentarians under the Earl of Denbigh took advantage of Rupert's and Byron's absence to capture Oswestry on 22 June.

On 2 July, Rupert was defeated at the Battle of Marston Moor, outside York, and retreated with his surviving forces into Lancashire and subsequently into Cheshire. He was unable to raise fresh forces in North Wales or obtain further reinforcements from Ireland, and went south to rejoin Charles, leaving Byron's weakened forces to hold the area. In August, Byron was driven from Lancashire, leaving Liverpool as the only major Royalist position in the county, under siege by forces under Sir John Meldrum.

Early in September, Parliamentarians under Myddelton and Mytton advanced from Oswestry into the upper River Severn valley and captured Newtown by surprise. With the town, they also seized a vital convoy of gunpowder which the besieged Royalists at Liverpool desperately needed. They then advanced to Montgomery. The medieval defences of the town were in ruins but the castle, which stood on a hill to the west of the town, was a formidable position. However its commander and owner, Lord Herbert, was ill and apparently unwilling to play any part in the war. He surrendered on terms on 5 September.

== Royalist siege ==
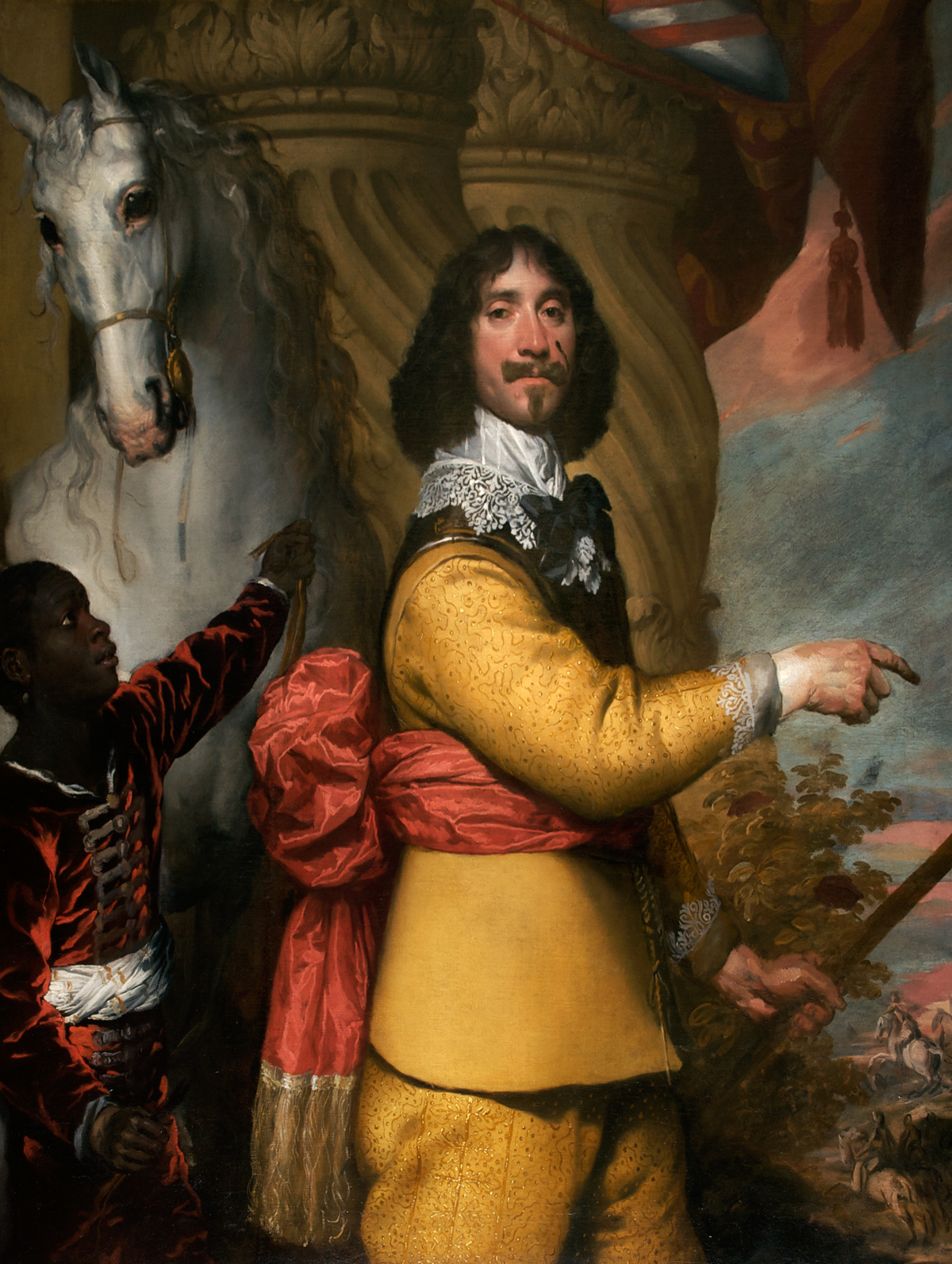
Portrait of Lord Byron by William Dobson, 1643

Three days later, Royalists under Sir Michael Erneley and Sir William Vaughan advanced on the castle from Shrewsbury, taking the Parliamentarians by surprise while they were dispersed to forage. Mytton retreated into the castle with 500 infantry while Myddelton rode away with the cavalry to seek help. The Royalists began to dig trenches and construct earthworks around the castle, preparing for a formal siege. They were joined by Byron and other detachments, including possibly some "Northern Horse" under Sir Marmaduke Langdale, eventually raising their forces to 2,800 infantry, 1,400 cavalry and 300 dragoons (mounted infantry).

The Parliamentarians also collected an army from several sources to relieve the castle. In addition to Myddelton's 300 cavalry, Sir William Brereton gathered infantry from Cheshire, Meldrum drew forces from the siege of Liverpool and Sir William Fairfax (cousin of Sir Thomas Fairfax) brought a contingent from the Parliamentarian army in Yorkshire. They ultimately numbered 2,000 infantry and 1,500 cavalry, with Meldrum in overall command.

== Battle ==
The events of the battle are poorly documented.

On 17 September, as the Parliamentarians approached, Byron left a detachment to guard the siege works around the castle and formed up on a hill, crowned by ancient earthworks, northwest of the castle. Meldrum formed up on flat ground 2 miles (3.2 km) to the north near the River Camlad, with part of Offa's Dyke protecting his flank. There was no action that day. The next day, about a third of the Parliamentarian cavalry rode off to forage. Byron ordered an attack, intending to capture Salt Bridge over the Camlad and cut off Meldrum's retreat.

Colonel Marcus Trevor's regiment of cavalry drove back the Parliamentarian cavalry, but the Parliamentarian Cheshire foot rallied. The Royalists were discouraged by the Parliamentarian stand. It is also possible that the Parliamentarian foraging parties returned, giving the Parliamentarian cavalry parity or even superiority in numbers. When the Parliamentarians counter-attacked, Myddelton's cavalry routed the Royalist horsemen, and Brereton's infantry drove back the Royalist infantry. Behind Byron, Mytton sallied from Montgomery Castle to defeat the detachments left to defend the siege works.

== Casualties ==
The Royalists were routed. 500 of them were killed, and 1,500 taken prisoner.

Among the Parliamentarians, Sir William Fairfax was mortally wounded. It was said that after his Yorkshire infantry had been repulsed three times, he led them in a final victorious charge against Royalist pikemen, but received up to 15 wounds. He lingered for sixteen hours, and asked Brereton to tell Parliament he accounted his life well spent in Parliament's services and to look after his widow and children.

== Aftermath ==
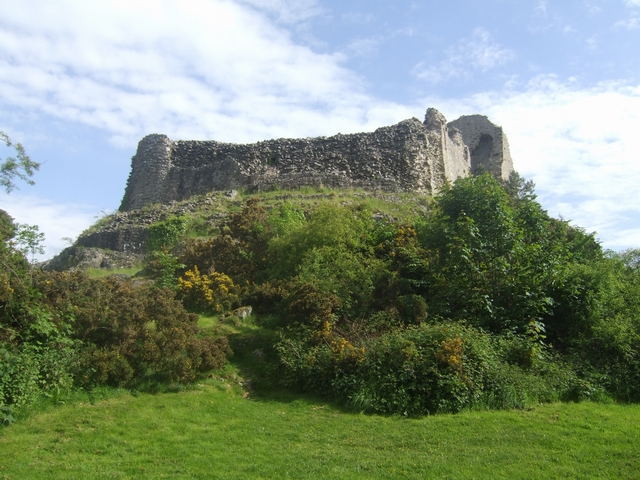
Montgomery Castle. Although "slighted" in 1648, its strength is apparent

After the battle, Meldrum returned to the siege of Liverpool, which surrendered on 1 November. He allowed the Irish soldiers in the garrison to depart to Ireland after they had undertaken not to serve the King again, despite Parliament having passed the Ordinance of no quarter to the Irish.

Many of Byron's defeated forces were already survivors of the defeat at Marston Moor. They included six regiments (including Vaughan's cavalry) which had returned from Ireland. Though the "Irish" regiments later joined the King's main "Oxford Army", the remnants of five regiments of infantry numbered barely 500 men when they took part in the Battle of Naseby.

Byron continued to defend Chester and the Royalists retained other medieval castles and walled towns in North Wales (including Myddelton's own seat at Chirk Castle). In April 1645, a Royalist detachment from the King's "Oxford Army" under Lieutenant General Charles Gerard recovered parts of Cheshire and recaptured Newtown. Gerard imposed harsh taxes and levies of troops before moving on to Pembrokeshire and South Wales. However, Gerard rejoined the King in May 1645, having alienated many Welsh Royalists with his severe requisitions, and the Parliamentarians reoccupied much of the territory he had taken.

Later in 1645, Byron was besieged in Chester. Charles, who was then based in Raglan Castle in South Wales, led his remaining forces to relieve Chester, but was defeated at the Battle of Rowton Heath, just outside the city. Although Byron held out in Chester, the Royalists in North Wales played little further active part in the war.
