= Battle of Oswestry =

Battle of the First English Civil War

Coordinates: 52.86111°N 3.05524°W

- Part of the First English Civil War
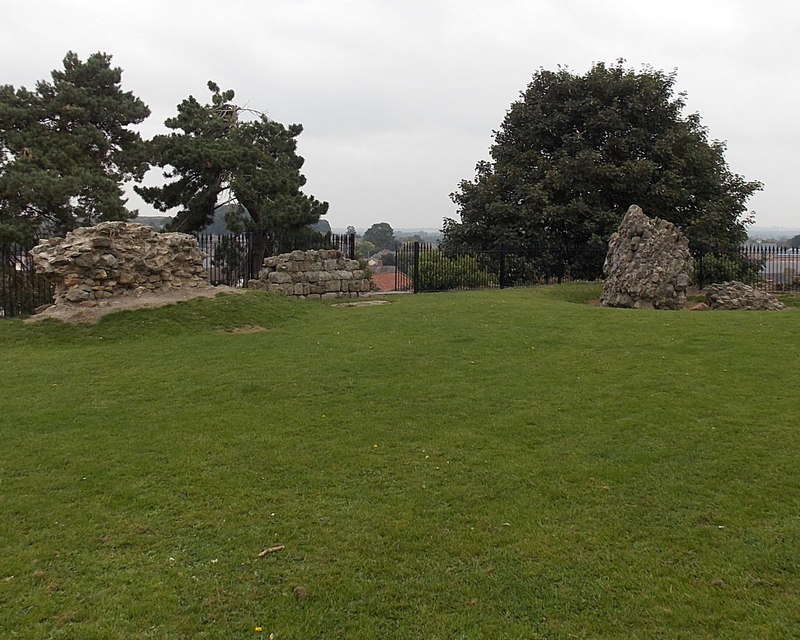
- Remains of Oswestry Castle
| Date | 22–23 June 1644 |
| Location | Oswestry, Shropshire |
| Result | Parliamentarian victory |

Belligerents
| Royalists | Parliamentarians |

Commanders and leaders
| Edward Lloyd | Lord Denbigh; Thomas Mytton |

Strength
| Unknown | 200 foot |

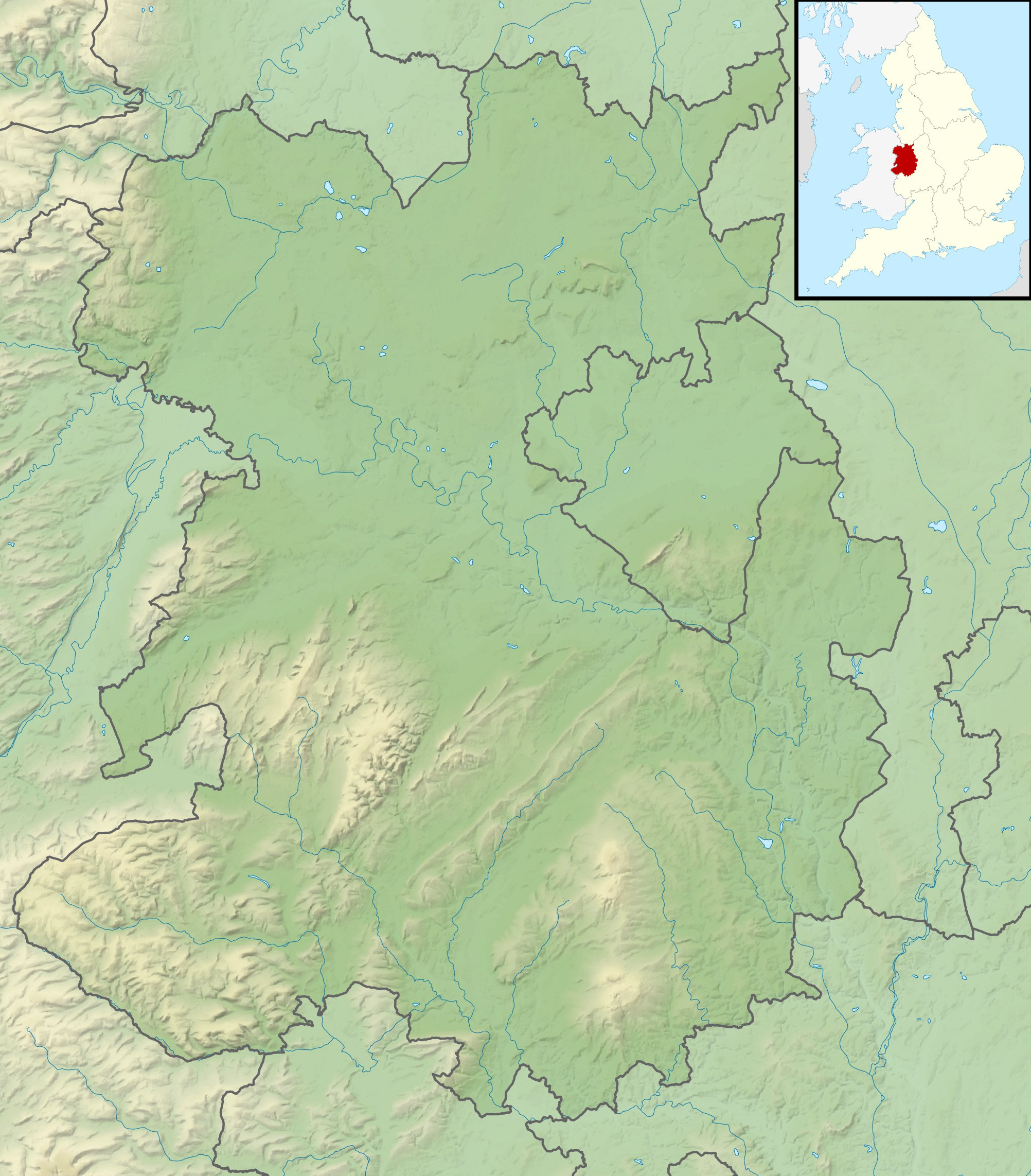
Shropshire and Oswestry

The Battle of Oswestry took place during the First English Civil War on 22–23 June 1644 when Parliamentarians led by Lord Denbigh attacked and took control of the Royalist garrison in Oswestry, Shropshire.

== Background ==
In February 1644, the Royalist commander Prince Rupert moved to Wales to take up his new post of President of Wales. In May of the year, however, he marched with his available forces to Lancashire, leaving Oswestry garrisoned by a small force under the command of Colonel Edward Lloyd. At that time, the Royalists of the Oswestry garrison were responsible for the control of Wales and the Marches. With the absence of Prince Rupert, the local Parliamentarians led by Lord Denbigh and Colonel Thomas Mytton decided in June 1644 to take control of the walled town and castle.

== Battle ==
The attack began at 14:00 hours on 22 June as the Parliamentarians had learned from spies that the garrison at that time was not fully defended as the Governor had taken some Parliamentary prisoners to Shrewsbury. The Parliamentarian cavalry was deployed in the rear to guard against relief attempts while 200 foot moved up to attack the town. In their initial attack, the Parliamentarians first captured the defended St Oswald's church which stood outside the town walls and then demolished the main gate of the town with cannon fire. The Royalist defenders withdrew to Oswestry Castle and the Parliamentarians occupied the town. The following morning the Royalist garrison was persuaded to surrender. Lord Denbigh then set off in pursuit of Prince Rupert, leaving Colonel Mytton to garrison the town.

== Aftermath ==
As the loss of Oswestry severed communications between Chester and Shrewsbury, Sir Fulke Huncke, the Royalist commander in Shrewsbury, felt obliged to recover the town and set off on a relief mission with 2000 infantry and 600 cavalry. Lord Denbigh, who had by now reached Cheshire, sent back Sir Thomas Myddelton with a force of cavalry to support the Parliamentarian defenders. Colonel Marrow led out the Royalist cavalry to intercept Myddelton's force, but was routed on 2 July by the Parliamentary cavalry at Whittington, some three miles from Oswestry.

Faced by the loss of his cavalry, Huncke was forced to return to Shrewsbury. Oswestry Castle was later destroyed by the Parliamentarians by 1650.

== Sources ==
- Cathrall, William (1855). The History of Oswestry. Oxford: Oxford University.
- Lancaster, James (2019). "Oswestry Castle and Oswestry Town Walls". CastlesFortsBattles.co.uk. CastlesFortsBattles.co.uk.
- Plant, David. "Oswestry, Shropshire, June-July 1644". BCW Project.
