= Ambrose Jones =

Welsh-Irish cleric (??–1678)

Ambrose Jones (died 15 December 1678) was a Welsh-Irish cleric who served as Anglican Bishop of Kildare 1667–1678. He was from a prominent family - his Oxford-educated father, Lewis Jones, served as Anglican Bishop of Killaloe, his oldest brother Henry Jones was Anglican Bishop of Clogher and later Meath, and his brothers Theophilus Jones, Oliver Jones, and Michael Jones were soldiers and politicians. His mother was Mabel Ussher, sister of James Ussher, Archbishop of Armagh.

Ambrose Jones was educated at Trinity College, Dublin, earning a Doctorate in divinity, and took up his father's post as prebend of Emly in February 1637/8. He later held church office as treasurer (1639) and precentor (1641) of Limerick, archdeacon of Meath (Feb. 1660/1), rector of Castletown, Meath (1665) and finally bishop of Kildare and prebend of Maynooth in 1667. As bishop, he made efforts to recover property that had been alienated from the see.

In May - June 1642 he was besieged with his father, Bishop Lewis Jones, and others in King John's Castle, Limerick by Irish forces; he was one of the representatives who negotiated the castle's surrender, and a surviving diary of the siege has been attributed to him.
