= Battle of Dungan's Hill =

1647 battle of the Irish Confederate Wars

Coordinates: 53.4494°N 6.7300°W

- Part of the Irish Confederate Wars
| Date | 8 August 1647 |
| Location | Dungan's Hill, near Summerhill, County Meath |
| Result | Parliamentarian victory |

Belligerents
| English Parliamentarians | Irish Confederates: Redshanks |

Commanders and leaders
| Michael Jones | Thomas Preston |

Strength
| 5,000 foot 1,500 horse | 7,000 foot 1,000 horse |

Casualties and losses
| Low | Over 3,000 killed |

Ireland and Dungan's Hill

The Battle of Dungan's Hill took place in County Meath, in eastern Ireland on 8 August 1647. It was fought between the armies of Confederate Ireland and the English Parliament during the Irish Confederate Wars. The Irish army was intercepted on a march towards Dublin and destroyed. Although it is a little-known event, even in Ireland, the battle was very bloody (with over 3000 deaths) and had important political repercussions. The Parliamentarian victory there destroyed the Confederate Leinster Army and contributed to the collapse of the Confederate cause and the Cromwellian conquest of Ireland in 1649.

== Background ==
By 1647, The Irish Catholic Confederation controlled all of Ireland except for Parliamentarian enclaves around Dublin and Cork and a Scottish outpost in Ulster. The previous year they had rejected a treaty with the English Royalists in favour of eliminating the remaining British forces in Ireland.

In August, the Confederate Leinster army under Thomas Preston was attempting to take Dublin from the English Parliamentarian garrison under Michael Jones, when it was intercepted by the Roundheads and forced to give battle. Jones had marched 32 miles to Trim to relieve the Parliamentarian garrison at Trim Castle. Preston, who had been shadowing Jones' movements, attempted to march on Dublin before Jones' army returned, but covered only 12 miles before being caught at Dungan's Hill, where the Confederate forces had to form up for battle.

The battle took place two miles south of the village of Summerhill.

== Battle ==
From a Parliamentarian point of view, victory in this battle was presented to them by the incompetence of the Irish commander. Preston was a veteran of the Thirty Years' War, where he had been a commander of the Spanish garrison at Leuven, but had no experience of open warfare or handling cavalry. Jones, by contrast, had been a cavalry officer in the English Civil War. As a result, Preston tried to move his cavalry along a narrow covered lane (site of the present-day main road), where they were trapped and subjected to enemy fire without being able to respond. Even worse, Preston had placed a large number of his troops in wheat fields over seven feet tall. As a result, these troops were unable to see the Parliamentarians until it was too late. With the Confederate army spread out and in confusion, Jones' troops fell in amongst them causing the demoralised Irish cavalry to flee the field, leaving the remainder of Preston's infantry unsupported.

The Confederate army's infantry were primarily equipped with pikes and heavy muskets and trained to stand in tercios in the Spanish manner. This meant they were difficult to break, but also highly immobile, without cavalry to cover their cumbersome formation when it moved. What was worse, Preston had positioned them in a large walled field, so that when their cavalry had run away, the Parliamentarians could surround and trap them. Some of the Irish infantry, Scottish Highlanders ("redshanks") brought to Ireland by Alasdair MacColla, managed to charge and break through Jones's men and escape into a nearby bog, where the English cavalry could not follow. Preston and about 2,000-3,000 of his regular infantry managed to follow the Highlanders to safety, but the remainder were trapped.

What happened next is disputed. The Irish infantry managed to hold off several assaults on their position, before trying to follow their comrades into the safety of the bog. This made them lose their formation and the Parliamentarians got in amongst them and then surrounded them in the bogland. Parliamentarian accounts simply say that the Irish force was then destroyed. Irish accounts, however, claim that the Confederate troops surrendered and were then massacred. One account, by a Catholic friar named O Meallain, says that the corpses of the Irish foot soldiers were found with their hands tied. A recent study suggests that the Irishmen probably tried to surrender, but that, according to the conventions of 17th-century warfare, this had to be accepted before it entitled them to safety. In this case, it was not accepted and the infantrymen were butchered.

Around 3,000 Confederate troops and a small number of Parliamentarians died at Dungan's Hill. One of the English regimental commanders, Colonel Anthony Hungerford, was shot in the mouth, a wound that invalided him out of the English Army. Most of the dead were Irish infantrymen killed in the last stage of the battle. Those prisoners who were taken were mainly officers, whom the Parliamentarians could either ransom or exchange for prisoners of their own. Richard Talbot (later Earl of Tyrconnell and Lord Deputy of Ireland, but then a junior cavalry officer) was among the Confederate prisoners, as was Edmund O'Dwyer.

In the immediate aftermath of the battle, Owen Roe's Ulster Army marched through the pass of Portlester Mill to mount an effective rearguard action, routing Jones' advanced brigade and enabling the survivors of the Leinster army to escape. Jones, fearing O'Neill's army, did not continue the pursuit and returned to Dublin. O'Neill and his Ulstermen returned four months later to bury the dead Confederates.

== See also ==
- Confederate Ireland
- Irish battles
- Irish Confederate Wars

== General References ==
- Lenihan, Padraig. "A Discussion of the battle and war in 17th century Ireland".
- McKeiver, Philip. A New History of Cromwell's Irish Campaign, Manchester 2007.
