= Thomas Mytton =

Welsh Puritan, soldier and politician (c. 1597 – 1656)

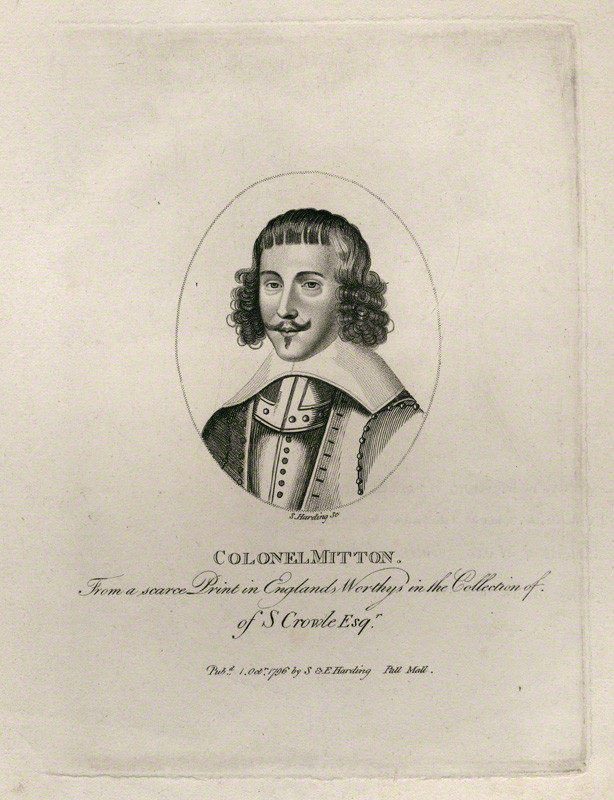
- Thomas Mytton, 1796 engraving of original portrait

Member of Parliament for Shropshire
- In office September 1654 – January 1655

Vice-admiral, North Wales
- In office 1647–1649

High Sheriff of Shropshire
- In office 1644–1645

Personal details
- Born: 1597 Halston, Shropshire
- Died: 29 November 1656 (aged 59) London
- Resting place: Old St Chad's Church, Shrewsbury (Note: The original collapsed in 1788 and was entirely rebuilt; only the crypt and churchyard remain)
- Party: Parliamentarian
- Spouse(s): (1) Magdalen Napier (1629-1648) (2) Barbara Leonard (1649-his death)
- Children: Margaret (1626-1647), Richard (1637-1670), Mary (?) and Sarah (1638-1698)
- Education: Balliol College, Oxford
- Occupation: Lawyer, soldier and administrator

Military service
- Allegiance: England
- Years of service: 1642 to 1648
- Rank: Major General
- Battles/wars: Wars of the Three Kingdoms; Oswestry; Montgomery Castle; Denbigh Green; North Wales campaign 1646; Battle of Red Hill 1648

Major General Thomas Mytton, also spelt Mitton, (1597-November 1656), was a lawyer from Oswestry who served in the Parliamentarian army during the Wars of the Three Kingdoms and as MP for Shropshire in the First Protectorate Parliament.

Part of a long-established local family, Mytton was one of the few members of the mostly Royalist Shropshire gentry to support Parliament. Despite his lack of military experience, he proved a determined and competent officer, eventually rising to command operations in North Wales. In December 1647 he was also appointed Vice-admiral, North Wales.

After helping to suppress a rising in North Wales during the 1648 Second English Civil War, he resigned his military posts and was appointed MP in 1654. He died in London and was buried in the churchyard of Old St Chad's Church, Shrewsbury on 29 November 1656.

== Personal details ==
Thomas Mytton was born in 1597, son of Richard Mytton of Halston in Shropshire, and Margaret Owen, daughter of Thomas Owen (ca 1542–1598), a judge who owned Condover Hall. His uncle Roger (1573-1617), was MP for Shrewsbury from 1601 to 1614 and High Sheriff of Shropshire in 1604. His sister Sarah (1598-1677) married Sir Edward Acton (1610-1659), who was MP for Bridgnorth.

In 1629, Mytton married Magdalen Napier (1610-1648), daughter of Sir Robert Napier (1560–1637), and sister-in-law of Sir Thomas Myddelton. They had at least seven children who survived into adulthood, including Margaret (1626-1647), Mary (1626-?), Edward (1633-1660), Magdalen (1636-?), Richard (1637-1670), Sarah (1638-1698) and Christian (1638-?). In 1649 he married again, this time to Barbara Lennard, daughter of the current Baron Dacre; they had no children.

== Early career and First Civil War ==
After attending Shrewsbury School, Mytton graduated from Balliol College, Oxford in 1615, then joined Lincoln's Inn in 1616 where he completed his legal training. There are few details available on his pre-war career but he supported Parliament during the Wars of the Three Kingdoms, despite most of the Shropshire gentry being Royalist, including his sister's husband. Both his mother and wife's families were Puritan sympathisers who opposed the policies of Charles I, although Mytton himself seemed less committed to 'Godly reforms".

Shropshire and North Wales, key locations, 1642 to 1648

When the First English Civil War began in August 1642, the regional centre of Shrewsbury was used to assemble recruits and supplies from Royalist areas in Wales and the North West, making the area important to both sides in June 1643, Parliament appointed the Earl of Denbigh military commander of Shropshire, Warwickshire, Worcestershire and Staffordshire, Sir Thomas Myddelton filling the same role in North Wales.

Mytton raised an infantry regiment in Cheshire and joined Myddelton to take Wem in September 1643, becoming Governor of the first Parliamentarian garrison in Shropshire (see Map). For the next twelve months, he used the town as a base for operations in support of Sir William Brereton's campaign against Chester and other Royalist positions in the region. Tensions developed with local Parliamentarians whom he accused of refusing to follow orders, a dispute that influenced subsequent events.

In June 1644, he and Denbigh took Oswestry, isolating Shrewsbury from Chester and providing a route for Parliamentarian offensives into Wales. A joint offensive with Myddleton led to the capture of Montgomery Castle in early September, while a Royalist attempt to retake it was repulsed on 18th in the biggest battle of the war in Wales and a major victory for Parliament. The new Parliamentarian governor was Sir John Pryce, a Royalist defector who switched sides again in May 1645.

His capture of Shrewsbury on 22 February 1645 forced the evacuation of remaining Royalist garrisons in central Shropshire, but local opposition to the appointment meant he did not become Governor. The war had become increasingly bitter on both sides, illustrated when Mytton hung twelve Irish Catholic prisoners taken at Shrewsbury, in accordance with the October 1644 Parliamentarian "Ordinance of no quarter to the Irish". Prince Rupert of the Rhine promptly responded by hanging the same number of English Protestants, which did little to improve his reputation for brutality but effectively ended the practice.

When Myddelton and Denbigh resigned their military offices in April 1645 under the self-denying ordinance, Mytton was promoted to Major General, made commander in North Wales and appointed High Sheriff of Shropshire. By late 1645, the Royalists were close to collapse and at Denbigh Green on 1 November, he defeated an attempt to relieve Chester, which capitulated in February 1646. Next he was ordered to reduce Royalist strongpoints in North Wales, which provided a potential bridgehead for supporters in Ireland; on 10 June, Charles instructed his remaining garrisons in England and Wales to yield, although most ignored this. By the end of August, Mytton had taken Ruthin, Caernarfon and Beaumaris on Anglesey. Denbigh Castle surrendered in October only after Charles sent its commander a personal note, Conwy held out until November, with Harlech the last to fall in March 1647.

== Second Civil War and Interregnum ==
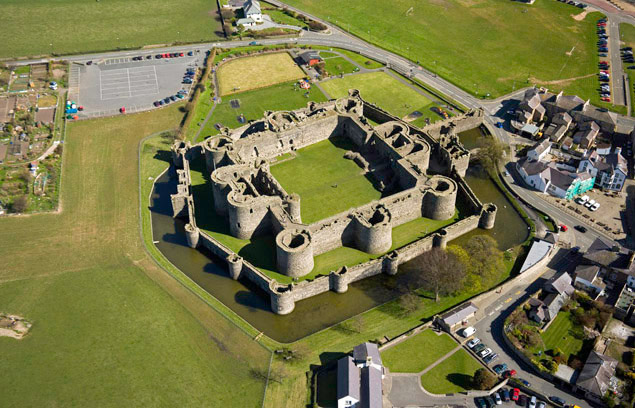
Beaumaris Castle; captured by Mytton in June 1646 and October 1648

Arguments over the settlement with Charles led to conflict between moderate MPs, who held a majority in Parliament, and a radical minority, who were supported by the New Model Army. The economic cost of the war, a poor 1646 harvest, and recurrence of the plague meant by March 1647 the troops in Wales had not been paid for eighteen months, while the New Model was owed over £3 million, an enormous sum at the time. Parliament ordered it to Ireland, stating only those who agreed would be paid; when their representatives demanded full payment for all in advance, the army was disbanded on 8 April 1647.

Since his troops were not part of the New Model, Mytton retained his position. In December, he was appointed Vice-admiral of North Wales in place of Thomas Glynn and granted £5,000 of confiscated Royalist estates. The Second English Civil War began in April 1648 when unpaid Parliamentarian garrisons in South Wales defected but Mytton remained loyal. The revolt in the south was quickly suppressed, that in the north collapsed after he and Myddelton defeated a Royalist force at Red Hill on 1 October and recaptured Beaumaris Castle.

This ended his military career and he played a relatively minor role under the Interregnum. He was part of the court-martial which sentenced the Earl of Derby to death for his part in the 1651 Third English Civil War and represented Shropshire in the First Protectorate Parliament. He died in London in November 1656 and was buried on 29 November in the original St Chad's Church, Shrewsbury.

== Sources ==
- BCW. "Colonel Thomas Mytton's Regiment of Foot". BCW Project.
- Helms, MW (1983). ACTON, Sir Walter, 2nd Bt. (c.1621-65), of Aldenham Hall, Salop in The History of Parliament: the House of Commons 1660-1690. Boydell & Brewer.
- Hutton, Ronald (2003). The Royalist War Effort 1642–1646. Routledge. ISBN 978-0-415-30540-2.
- Ibbetsen, David (2004). "Owen, Thomas (died 1598)". Oxford Dictionary of National Biography (online ed.). Oxford University Press. doi:10.1093/ref:odnb/21032. (Subscription, Wikipedia Library access or UK public library membership required.)
- Plant. "Battle of Montgomery". BCW Project.
- Rees, John (2016). The Leveller Revolution. Verso. ISBN 978-1-78478-390-7.
- Roberts, Stephen (2004). "Mytton, Thomas". Oxford Dictionary of National Biography (online ed.). Oxford University Press. doi:10.1093/ref:odnb/19714. (Subscription, Wikipedia Library access or UK public library membership required.)
- Royle, Trevor (2004). Civil War: The Wars of the Three Kingdoms 1638–1660 (2006 ed.). Abacus. ISBN 978-0-349-11564-1.
- St Chads. "History of St Chad's with St Mary's, Shrewsbury". St Chads Church.
- Williams, Richard. "Mytton of Halston".
