= Michael Jones (soldier) =

Irish soldier of the Irish Confederate War and English Civil War

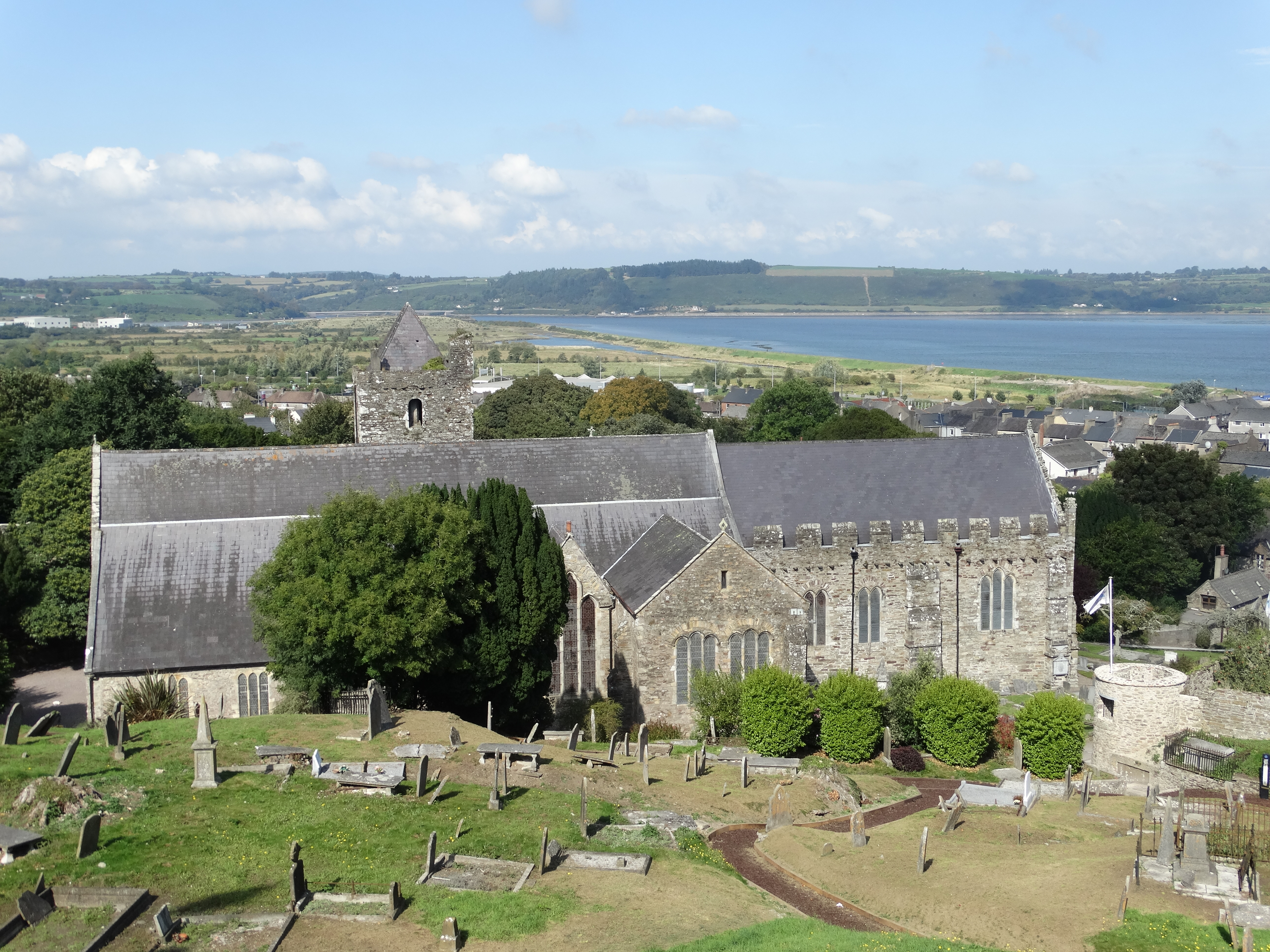
- St Mary's, Youghal, where Jones was buried

Governor of Dublin
- In office 1647–1649

Governor of Chester
- In office 1646–1647

Personal details
- Born: c. 1606 to 1610 Ardagh, County Longford
- Died: 10 December 1649 (aged 42–43) Dungarven, County Wexford
- Spouse: Mary Culme (1646–his death)
- Relations: Lewis Jones, Bishop of Killaloe (1560–1646)

Military service
- Years of service: 1641–1649
- Rank: Lieutenant-General
- Battles/wars: Wars of the Three Kingdoms; Dungan's Hill; Chester; Denbigh Green; Rowton Heath; Rathmines; Drogheda; Wexford; Waterford

Michael Jones (c. 1606 to 10 December 1649) was an Irish-born Protestant soldier of Welsh descent who fought in the War of the Three Kingdoms, primarily in Ireland. Third son of Lewis Jones, Bishop of Killaloe, his brothers Henry and Ambrose were also bishops in the Church of Ireland.

After the outbreak of the Irish Rebellion of 1641, he served in the army raised by Charles I of England against the Catholic Confederacy. The First English Civil War began in August 1642, and in September 1643 Charles agreed a truce with the Confederacy. Intended to allow the transfer of Irish Royalist troops to England, like many Protestants Jones objected to the deal. Sent to England in 1644 as part of a delegation to argue their case, when Charles refused to change he joined Parliamentarian forces in Cheshire.

In June 1647, Parliament appointed him governor of Dublin, and military commander in Leinster. He won significant victories over Royalist/Confederate armies at Dungan's Hill and Rathmines, and after Oliver Cromwell arrived in August 1649, served under him at Drogheda and Wexford. The Commonwealth army then besieged Waterford, but suffered severely from sickness, and was forced to retreat. Jones died of fever on 10 December 1649.

== Personal details ==
Michael Jones was born between 1606 and 1610 in Ardagh, County Longford, third of five sons of Lewis Jones (1560–1646), a Welshman who became Bishop of Killaloe in 1633. His maternal uncle James Usher was head of the Church of Ireland from 1625 to 1656, while two of his brothers also became bishops, Henry (1605–1681) and Ambrose (died 1678). His other two brothers, Oliver (c. 1612–1664) and Theophilus (c. 1606–1685) were soldiers and politicians.

In February 1646, he married Mary Culme (?–1661), widow of Sir Hugh Culme (died 1630); they had no children, and in 1650 she applied to the English House of Commons for payment of a pension promised to her husband. He left his few possessions to his nephew and namesake Michael, son of his brother Henry and Mary's daughter Jane Culme.

== Career ==
=== 1641 to 1646 ===
In 1631, Jones began studying law at Lincoln's Inn in London. In November 1640, he became a qualified lawyer a member of King's Inns, Dublin. When the Irish Rebellion erupted in November 1641, he joined the Royal Army raised to suppress it. In the initial stages of the Irish Confederate Wars, he fought under the Earl of Ormonde, a Royalist loyal to Charles I. He took part in a number of outpost skirmishes around Lismore, County Waterford, quickly becoming known as an energetic and capable leader of cavalry. However, the outbreak of the First English Civil War in August 1642 meant Ormonde could no longer receive reinforcements or money from England, and by mid-1643, the Catholic Confederacy held most of Ireland, with the exception of Ulster, Dublin and Cork City.

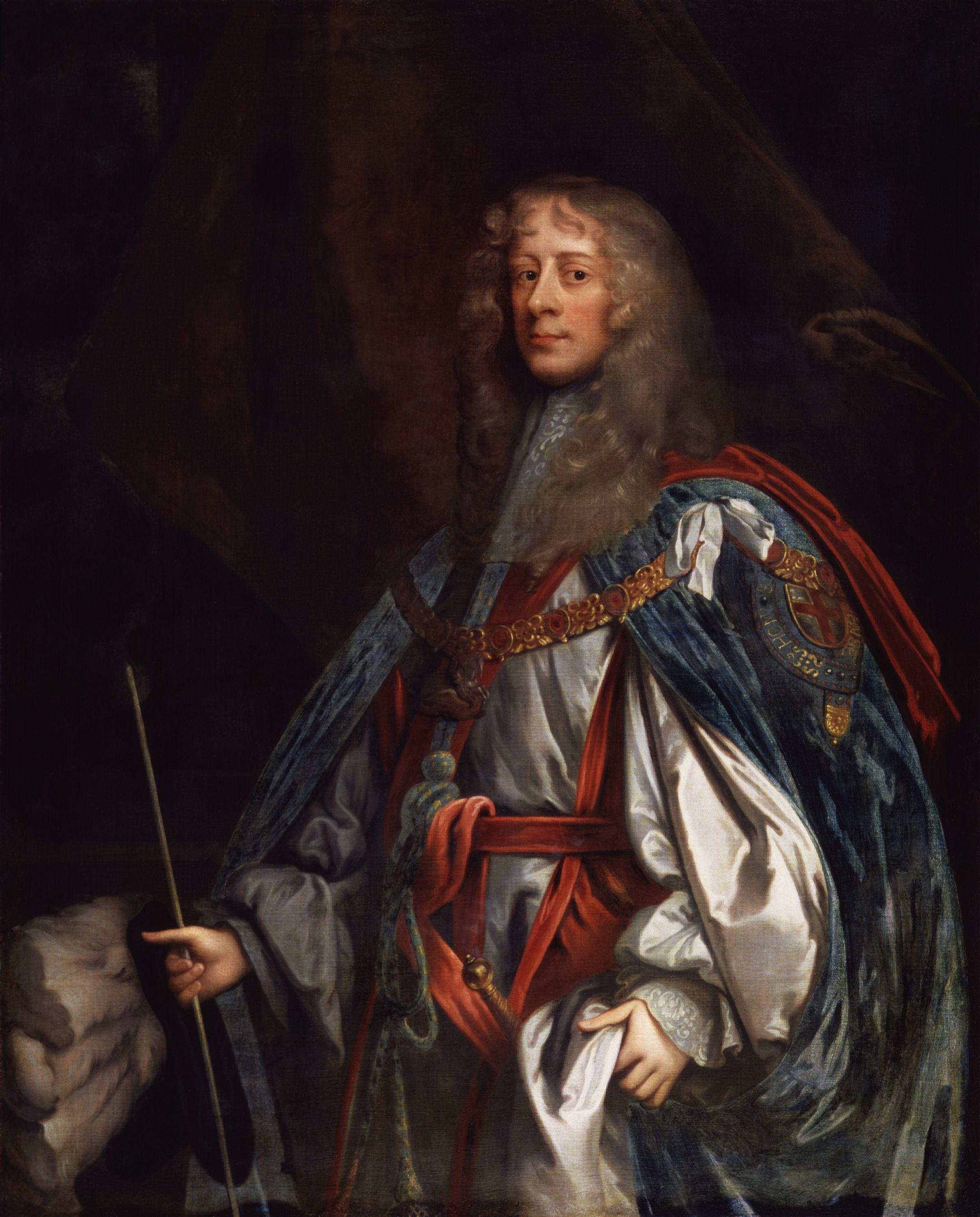
The Earl of Ormonde, Royalist commander who dominated Irish politics for much of the 17th century

Charles was anxious to use his Irish troops to help him win the war in England, and in September 1643, Ormonde agreed a truce or "Cessation" with the Confederacy. Factions on both sides objected to the terms, which included limited freedom of worship for Catholics and constitutional reforms. Protestants saw this as a threat, while many Confederates felt they were on the verge of victory and gained nothing from the truce, particularly since any concessions Charles made to Catholics in Ireland undermined his position in England and Scotland. Nevertheless, in early 1644 the Confederacy sent a delegation to the Royalist war-time capital in Oxford to begin talks.

Now a Major in the Earl of Kildare's regiment, Jones was selected by his Protestant colleagues as part of an informal Commission to represent their views. Ormonde transferred 6,000 troops from Ireland to the Royalist army in England, including Jones; on discovering this, he withdrew from the Commission and joined Parliamentarian forces under Sir William Brereton in Cheshire. While his reasons are disputed, the consensus is he believed only a Parliamentarian victory could secure the Church of Ireland, and opposed negotiations with the Confederation. Despite his own dislike of the truce, his brother Henry remained loyal to Ormonde and was rewarded by being appointed Bishop of Clogher in 1645.

The war in Ireland cut across religious and political lines, with both Ormonde and the Confederacy claiming to be loyal to Charles. In Ulster, there was a three sided war between Ormondist Royalists, Gaelic Catholics under Eoghan Ó Néill, and Presbyterian militia, known as the Laggan Army, supported by Scots Covenanters led by Robert Munro. This made loyalties extremely complex, as demonstrated by Michael's brother Theophilus, commander of a Royalist garrison at Lisburn; although hostile to the Confederacy, in May 1644 he refused entry to Munro, his nominal ally, and later disregarded orders from Parliament.

Jones spent the next two years blockading the key Royalist possession of Chester. The nature of this warfare is demonstrated by a raiding party he led through Herefordshire in April 1645, which stole 6,000 sheep, 500 cows and killed 21 people, most of whom died in defence of their property. In September, he fought in the Battle of Rowton Heath, a Parliamentarian victory that scattered the last significant Royalist field farmy outside the West Country. He also prevented relief forces reaching the city at Denbigh Green in November, and was appointed Governor when Chester finally surrendered on 6 February 1646. For reasons that are unclear, he fell out with Brereton, who ended the war as one of the most influential Parliamentarians and arranged for his transfer to Ireland.

=== Governor of Dublin; 1647 to 1649 ===
1647–1649 campaign in Ireland; key locations

In April 1646, Parliament appointed Lord Lisle as Lord Lieutenant of Ireland, with Jones as one of his military commanders, although he was unable to take up his position as Ormonde still held Dublin for Charles I. The blockade imposed by the Parliamentarian navy brought trade in the city to a standstill, forcing Ormonde to agree terms in early March 1647. Named Governor of Dublin, Jones landed on 6 June 1647 with 2,000 troops and quickly enforced a series of measures, including the expulsion of Catholics and arrest of Protestant Royalists; in late July, Ormonde himself was exiled.

At the beginning of August, Jones left Dublin with around 4,000 foot and 800 horse for Trim, which was besieged by a Confederate army under General Thomas Preston. As he approached, Preston lifted the siege and withdrew across the River Boyne, apparently intending to march on Dublin. On 8 August, Jones won a crushing victory at the Battle of Dungans Hill; more than half of Preston's army of 8,000 was killed or captured, along with their artillery and baggage, and the Confederates lost control of Leinster. In September, his colleague Inchiquin won a similarly decisive victory at Knocknanuss, securing Munster.

The outbreak of the Second English Civil War in February 1648 prevented Jones fully exploiting his success while Inchiquin changed sides in April. Despite defeat in England and Scotland, Charles still hoped to regain his throne with Irish support, and on 17 January 1649, Ormonde and Inchiquin signed a treaty with the Confederation; after Charles was executed on 30 January, they were joined by the Laggan Army and Munro's Covenanters. However, the alliance was opposed by the Gaelic Catholic faction led by Ó Néill and split the Confederates; Jones sent his elder brother Henry to negotiate a truce with Ó Néill, who also released their younger brother Theophilus, captured in Kells, County Antrim in December 1646.

Despite this split, by the end of May the Royalist/Confederate alliance controlled most of Ireland. After capturing Drogheda and Dundalk in June, Ormonde moved onto Dublin, hoping to prevent its use by the expeditionary force being assembled in England by Cromwell. On 22 July, he arrived outside the town with 11,000 men; four days later Jones received reinforcements from Chester under Robert Venables, increasing his strength to 4,000 infantry, and 1,200 cavalry. Although outnumbered, the Parliamentarian troops were experienced veterans, while their opponents were largely poorly trained and equipped. On 2 August, Jones defeated Ormonde at Rathmines, a victory described as the 'decisive battle of the Engagement in Ireland.'

One of the Royalist officers captured at Rathmines was Richard Elliott, son of Michael's sister Mary; Jones demonstrated the bitterness engendered by over eight years of war by executing his nephew. He also displayed typical energy in immediately seeking to take advantage of this success by marching on Drogheda, but the town refused to surrender and he had insufficient troops to storm it. He returned to Dublin, where Oliver Cromwell landed on 15 August with 12,000 troops, and appointed him Lieutenant-general of the cavalry, with John Hewson becoming Governor. Leaving his brother Theophilus in command of the Dublin garrison, Jones supported Cromwell in the capture of Drogheda and Wexford.

He fell ill during the unsuccessful Siege of Waterford in late November and was taken to Dungarvan, where he died on 10 December 1649. In a letter reporting his death to Parliament, Cromwell wrote "What England lost hereby is above me to speak". Jones was a close associate of Lord Broghill, later a senior member of the Commonwealth government, whose father was the Richard Boyle, 1st Earl of Cork. In a gesture of their personal friendship, he was buried in the Boyle family vault at St. Mary's Church in Youghal, with Cromwell giving the funeral oration. 24 Church Street, the house where he died in Dungarven, has a plaque commemorating the fact.

== Sources ==
- BCW. "The Cessation of Arms". BCW Project.
- Bernard, Toby (2004). "Butler, James, first duke of Ormond". Oxford Dictionary of National Biography (online ed.). Oxford University Press. doi:10.1093/ref:odnb/4191. (Subscription, Wikipedia Library access or UK public library membership required.)
- Brereton, Sir William (2007). Carr, Ivor (ed.). Civil War in Staffordshire in the spring of 1646:Sir William Brereton's Letter Book April–May 1646. Staffordshire Records Society. pp. 73–74, 94. ISBN 978-0901719379.
- Brooke-Tyrrell, Alma (1970). "Michael Jones: Governor of Dublin". Dublin Historical Record. 24 (1): 159–172. JSTOR 30103903.
- Carlton, Charles (1992). Going to the Wars; The experience of the British Civil Wars, 1638–1651. Routledge. ISBN 0-415-03282-2.
- Clarke, Aidan (2004). "Jones, Michael". Oxford Dictionary of National Biography (online ed.). Oxford University Press. doi:10.1093/ref:odnb/15063. (Subscription, Wikipedia Library access or UK public library membership required.)
- Clarke, Aidan (2004). "Jones, Henry". Oxford Dictionary of National Biography (online ed.). Oxford University Press. doi:10.1093/ref:odnb/15010. (Subscription, Wikipedia Library access or UK public library membership required.)
- Clarke, Aidan. "Jones, Henry". Dictionary of Irish Biography.
- Clarke, Aidan. "Jones, Sir Theophilus". Dictionary of Irish Biography.
- de Courcy, J.W. (1996). The Liffey in Dublin. Gill & Macmillan. p. 468. ISBN 0-7171-2423-1.
- Dodd, Arthur. "JONES, MICHAEL (died 1649), soldier". Dictionary of Welsh Biography. National Library of Wales.
- Finnegan, David (2014). "The Irish Catholic clergy, Stuart sovereignty and the 1650 appeal to the Duke of Lorraine". Revue électronique d'études sur le monde anglophone. 11 (4). doi:10.4000/erea.3734.
- Fraher, Willie. "24 Church Street, Dungarven". The Memory Trail.
- Hayes-McCoy, Gerard Anthony (1990) [1969]. Irish Battles: A Military History of Ireland. Belfast: The Appletree Press. ISBN 0-86281-250-X.
- HMSO (1802). Journal of the House of Commons; Volume VI 25 June 1650. HMSO.
- Lenihan, Padraig (2001). Confederate Catholics at War. Cork University Press. ISBN 978-1859182444.
- Little, Patrick. "Jones, Michael". Dictionary of Irish Biography.
- Plant, David. "Michael Jones". BCW Project.
- Royle, Trevor (2004). Civil War: The Wars of the Three Kingdoms 1638–1660 (2006 ed.). Abacus. ISBN 978-0-349-11564-1.
- Scott, David (2003). Politics and War in the Three Stuart Kingdoms, 1637-49. Palgrave. ISBN 978-0333658741.
- Wedgwood, CV (1958). The King's War, 1641-1647 (2001 ed.). Penguin Classics. ISBN 978-0141390727.
