= Battle of Stow-on-the-Wold =

Battle of the First English Civil War

Coordinates: 51°57′06.15″N 1°43′41.87″W

- Part of First English Civil War
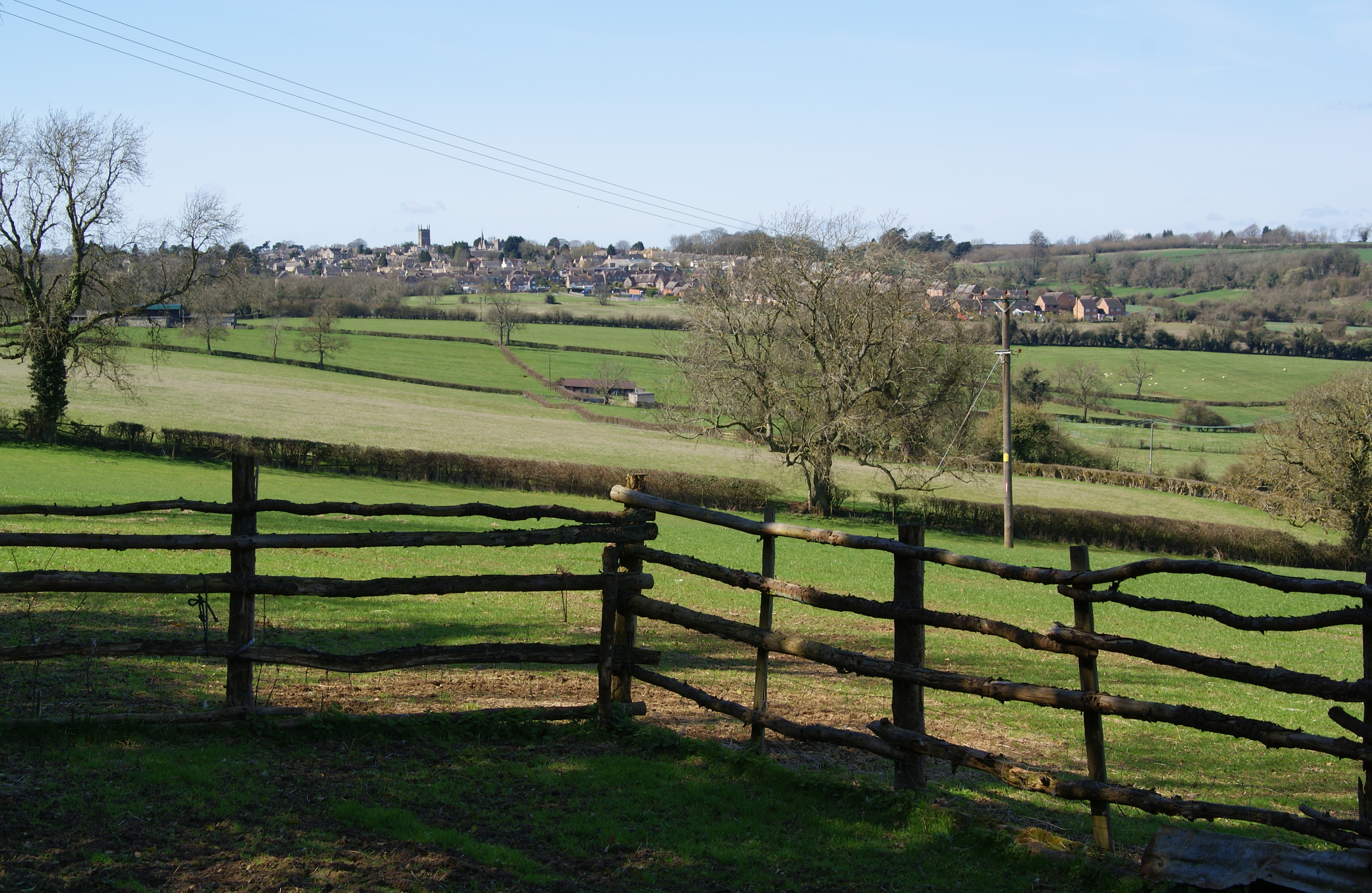
Date	21 March 1646
Location	Near Stow-on-the-Wold, Gloucestershire
Result	Parliamentarian victory

Belligerents
Royalists	Parliamentarians

Commanders and leaders
Sir Jacob Astley	Sir William Brereton; Colonel Thomas Morgan

Strength
3,000 foot 500 horse	2,500 foot 600 horse

Casualties and losses
Fewer than 1,000 killed 1,000 captured	Light
- Gloucestershire

The Battle of Stow-on-the-Wold (21 March 1646) took place near Stow-on-the-Wold in Gloucestershire during the First English Civil War. It was a Parliamentarian victory by detachments of the New Model Army over the last Royalist field army.

In the spring of 1646, King Charles I of England was getting ever more desperate to hold the Royalist cause together whilst waiting for the long promised relief forces from Ireland, Scotland and France. Sir Jacob Astley took command of the Royalist forces in the west and began to gather up the remnants from the handful of Royalist garrisons still left in the West Midlands to create a new field army. At this point in the war, Royalist morale was low. However, Astley, a stalwart of the Royalist commanders and an experienced soldier, was able to cobble together a force of 3,000. While returning to Oxford he was intercepted and defeated at Stow-on-the-Wold.

== Prelude ==
The year of 1646 began badly for Charles I. On no side was there the smallest break in the gloom that surrounded him. He had no army, and there was but small chance of his being able to raise one. All his resources were exhausted. Without money, without arms, without supplies, his fate was clear but, what was still worse, if possible, was the disunion among the Royalists: Charles' quarrel with his nephews, although patched up, might break out again at any minute.

It was obvious to all, Royalists or Parliamentarians, that whatever the rights or wrongs of the struggle might originally have been, its continuance could do no good to either party, and only aggravated the prevailing discontent.

Lord Astley left Oxford on 22 December 1645, to go round the different garrisons in the West Midlands, trying to raise an army. His task was a difficult one, and not the less so by his extreme want of money. Had Astley a good supply of this, he might have raised a fairly formidable force, without it he could do nothing with the drunken dissolute bands of robbers who formed the bulk of the soldiers in the Royalist garrisons. Astley arrived at Worcester early in 1646. One of his first acts was to march out to Madresfield. The Royalist garrison there had been besieged since October, by men from the Gloucester and Evesham Parliamentary garrisons, but it had held out, and Astley was now able, with a party from the Worcester garrison, to drive off the besiegers and raise the siege.

Astley went from Worcester to Ludlow, intending to unite with Sir William Vaughan, but the presence of Parliamentarian troops and the floods arising from the breaking up of the great frost and the thaw made movement impossible, and prevented Astley from attempting anything. He fell back towards Bewdley. On 5 February 1646, the besieged royalist city of Chester surrendered. Lord Byron had held out to the last and had to yield from want of fuel and of food. Horses, dogs, and cats had been eaten, and Byron was unable to do more. He had held the place for sixteen weeks, and there was no hope of relief.

The fall of Chester was a serious blow to the Royalist cause, in that it set free a large force who would now operate upon the other Royalist garrisons. Astley, finding that it was useless to look towards Chester, set to work to collect men to go to the relief of the King at Oxford (see Siege of Oxford (1646)) but he was too late. In the Cotswolds, barring his way, was Sir Thomas Morgan, the governor of the Gloucester garrison, with a formidable force. On his right flank was John Birch, the governor of Hereford, with a force more than equal to any that Astley could bring into the field, while in his rear, pushing him onwards towards Morgan and Birch, was Sir William Brereton, his army now able to act as Chester had fallen.

Astley had visited Stafford and other garrisons to collect his force. He had tried to relieve the besieged High Ercall Hall, but had failed. At last, he perceived that, if he was to join the Charles I at Oxford, the time had come to do so. Therefore, in the beginning of March, he gave orders for all the men from the different garrisons who would join him, to rendezvous at Bridgnorth; here he collected some 3,000 men.

Astley was in dire need of money, so much so that he had to borrow from the corporation of Bridgnorth to pay his personal expenses there. It may be imagined to what straits the Royalists were reduced when it is said that out of these more than half were "reformado" officers, that is, officers of regiments that had either ceased to exist, from being destroyed or disbanded, or become so reduced in numbers there was no need for such officers. They formed a desperate band of broken men, who had all to gain by plunder and everything to lose by peace.

Having collected his men Astley advanced from Bridgnorth to Kidderminster. Some sort of a post, probably a look-out post, to watch any movement of men, was kept at Trimpley. A skirmish took place near Kidderminster, as the registers show that Captain Charles Dungham and one of his soldiers were killed and buried.

From Kidderminster, Astley marched to Worcester, where he halted for a few days, and his troubles began. He was aware that Morgan and Birch were waiting for him at Broadway, and Brereton was moving up in his rear and pressing him forward. Astley's task was a difficult one. Evesham had a Parliamentary garrison and the River Avon could not be crossed there. In the hills, on his road to Oxford, were Morgan and Birch, waiting for the first sight of his men to unite and fall on him; while still nearer Oxford, if he got past these forces, Charles Fleetwood was waiting between Stow and Oxford to intercept any Royalist attempt to relieve Astley, or to cut off any of Astley's men who got past Morgan.

Astley's first move quite deceived his opponents. He sent some of his men forward towards Evesham, but with the main body he marched back to Droitwich, thus leading Brereton to think he was about to attack him. Then making across country by Feckenham and Inkberrow to Bidford and Cleve Prior, he crossed the Avon, and pushed down Buckle Street to Honeybourne, leaving Morgan at Broadway on his right, he marched past his flank to Campden, Blockley, Bourton-on-the-Hill, for Stow.

== Battle ==
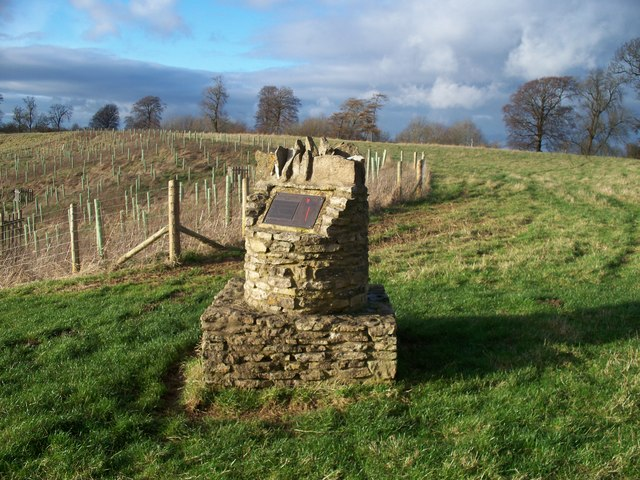
Battle viewpoint

On 20 March, Morgan, finding that Astley had out-manoeuvred him, made a series of attacks on his rearguard, harassing and delaying their march, so as to give time for Birch to come up in front and Brereton to advance in the rear. Astley, by pushing on, had reached Donnington, a village in Gloucestershire about two miles from Stow-on-the-Wold.

Astley chose a low hill just to the west of Donnington to make his last stand. (Note: The low hill just west of Donnington is the traditional site of the battle, however "Survey work carried out at the traditional site, the A424 site and the ridge between the A424 and A429 by the Battlefields Trust in October 2015 failed to identify battlefield remains. This opens the possibility that the battle was fought much closer to Stow than has hitherto been suggested. Further survey work is required on all possible locations before any conclusion can be drawn.") Brereton having now come up, Morgan attacked the wearied Royalists in the dark, two hours before dawn, on 21 March. Birch in front, and Morgan in the rear tried to surround the Royalists. Morgan charged Astley's rear commanded by Richard Mustoe, with 200 firelocks and 400 horse. He was repulsed twice, and Astley nearly succeeded in breaking through the ring that was surrounding him but as Astley pressed through Morgan's men in the rear, Birch pressed his charges home in the front. Still Astley showed a stubborn resistance. Birch's horse was shot under him, his regiment had 32 men killed. The Royalists fought a running retreat into the streets of Stow.

In spite of all the Royalist efforts, the ring gradually tightened round Astley. At last, seeing a possible way of escape, some of the Royalists broke and fled; through their broken ranks Birch's horse rode in; there was nothing then left but to surrender.

== Aftermath ==
With the surrender, the last Royalist field army ceased to exist. Lord Astley, Sir Charles Lucas, Colonel Corbet, Colonel Gerrard, Colonel Molesworth, Lieutenant Colonel Broughton, and Major Billingsley were among the prisoners. Out of the 3,000 men Astley had with him Morgan returned 1,600 prisoners. Many were killed, more were wounded, the rest dispersed. Those who had broken through were possibly the worst off; they were overtaken, cut down and killed by Fleetwood's dragoons. All the Royalist arms and ammunition were taken.

The rout was complete; Astley's force, which he had collected with so much care and manoeuvred with so much skill, was destroyed. Astley fully recognised this. Worn out by his marches, his manoeuvres and his fight, he sat down on a drum and, addressing Morgan's men, said:

You have done your work, boys, and may go play, unless you will fall out among yourselves.

This was a fitting epitaph to the last major battle of the First Civil War from the man who is often quoted for his soldiers' prayer at the first major battle. (Note: For his prayer at the Battle of Edgehill "O Lord, Thou knowest how busy I must be this day. If I forget Thee, do not forget me.") So ended the last Royalist field army, because as Clarendon wrote in his history: "There remained from that time no possibility for the King to draw any other troops into the field". Charles had fought from August, 1642, to March, 1646, with the result that the Parliament only had to reduce the few strongholds that still held out for him. When this was done Parliament's military victory was completed.

== Legacy ==
In St Edward's Church, Stow-on-the-Wold, there is a monument to Sir Hastings Keyte, who was a Royalist captain killed in the battle, aged 23.
