= Jacob Astley, 1st Baron Astley of Reading =

British Royalist commander (1579–1652)

The Lord Astley of Reading
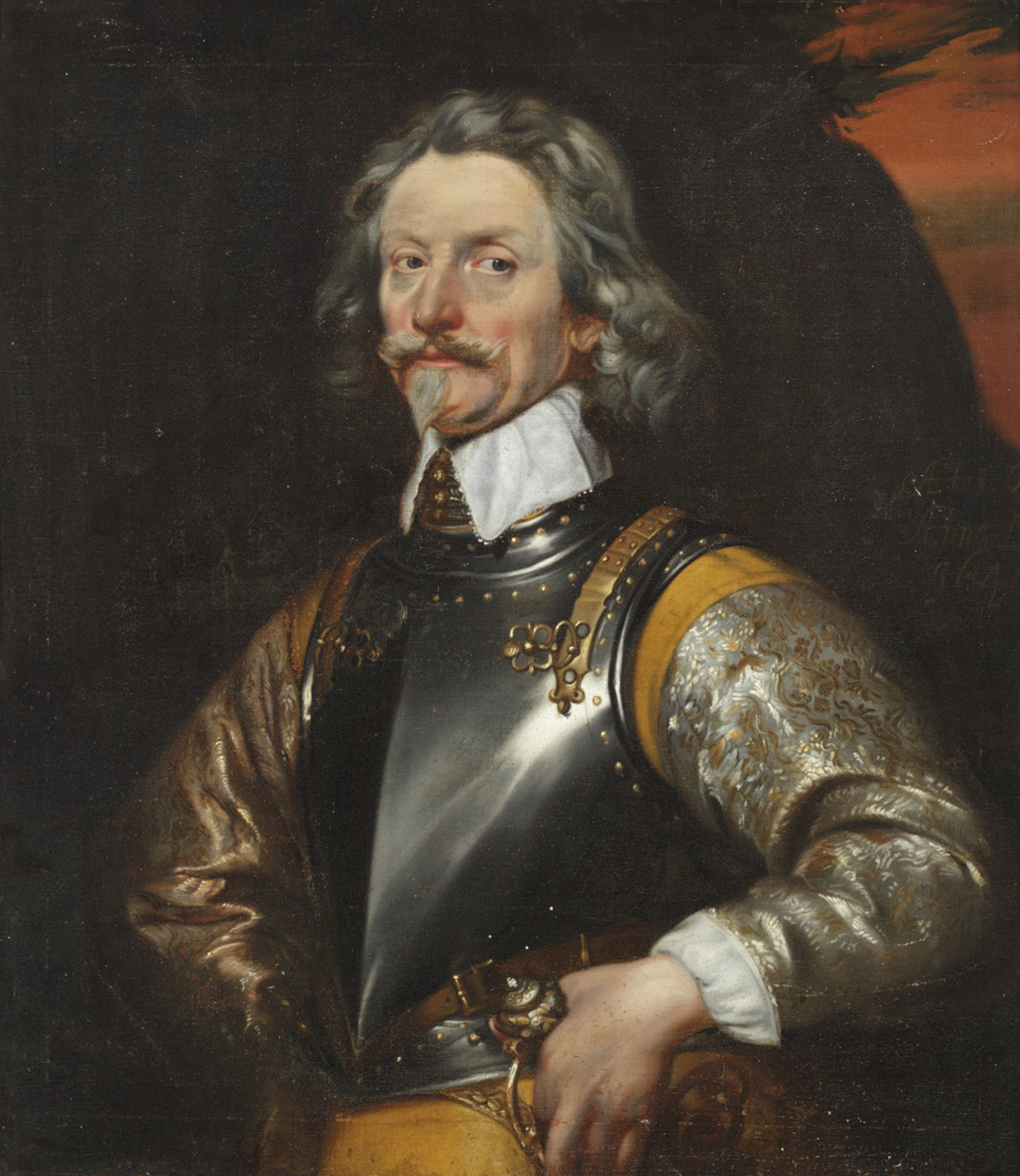
- Born: 1579; Melton Constable Hall
- Died: February 1652 (aged 72–73)
- Military career
- Allegiance: Royalist
- Rank: Major General of the Infantry
- Conflicts: Battle of Edgehill, Siege of Gloucester, First Battle of Newbury, Battle of Naseby, Battle of Stow-on-the-Wold

Jacob Astley, 1st Baron Astley of Reading (1579 – February 1652) was a Royalist commander in the English Civil War and most famously served during the Battle of Newbury and Naseby. He also was involved in the Dutch Revolt and the Thirty Years War. After the second phase of the Civil War, he was imprisoned and then retired in Maidstone. He died shortly after in 1652.

== Life ==
He came from an established Norfolk family, and was born at Melton Constable Hall. His first experiences of war were at the age of 18 when he joined the Islands Voyage expedition in 1597 under the Earl of Essex and Sir Walter Raleigh to the Azores. In 1598 he joined Maurice of Nassau and Henry of Orange in the Netherlands, where he served with distinction in the Dutch Revolt. Afterwards he fought under Frederick V, Elector Palatine and Gustavus Adolphus in the Thirty Years' War. He was evidently thought highly of by the States-General, for when he was absent, serving under Christian IV of Denmark, his position in the Dutch army was kept open for him.

In 1622 Astley joined the household of Elizabeth, daughter of James I of England and her husband Frederick, King of Bohemia serving as military tutor to Frederick's son Prince Rupert.

Returning to England with a well-deserved reputation, he was in the employment of Charles I in various military capacities. As "Sergeant-Major-General" of the infantry, he went north in 1639 to organize the defence against the expected Scottish invasion. Here his duties were as much diplomatic as military, as the discontent which ended in the Civil War was now coming to a head. He went north again in 1640 as Sergeant-Major-General of the infantry and colonel of the combined Oxfordshire and Berkshire Trained Bands. In the ill-starred Bishops' Wars, Astley provided service to the king, and he was involved in the so-called "Army Plot".

At the outbreak of the First English Civil War in 1642 he at once joined Charles, and was made Major-General of the Foot (infantry)—the cavalry was under the command of his former student Prince Rupert. His characteristic battle-prayer at the Battle of Edgehill has become famous: "O Lord, Thou knowest how busy I must be this day. If I forget Thee, do not thou forget me" which he followed promptly with the order "March on, boys!" Both sides' troops were poorly trained and both sides claimed the battle to be a victory, but the outcome was inconclusive and it would take a further three years of civil war before the Royalists lost to the Parliamentarians.

Astley was loyal supporter of the Crown throughout the First Civil War, while his own region of East Anglia was strongly Parliamentarian. His opposite number in the Parliamentarians was Philip Skippon, another Norfolkman. At Gloucester Astley commanded a division, and at the First Battle of Newbury he led the infantry of the royal army. With Ralph Hopton, in 1644, he served at Arundel and Cheriton. He was not present at Cheriton, although his son, Bernard, probably was, as his regiment of foot was certainly there. At the second Battle of Newbury he made a gallant and memorable defence of Shaw House. He was made a baron by King Charles, and at the Battle of Naseby he once more commanded the main body of the infantry.

He afterwards served in the west, and with 3,000 men fought stubbornly but vainly at the Battle of Stow-on-the-Wold (March 1646), the last pitched battle of the First Civil War. He surrendered to the Parliamentarians with the prophetic words "Well, boys, you have done your work, now you may go and play—if you don't fall out among yourselves".

His scrupulous sense of honour forbade him to take any part in the Second Civil War, as he had given his parole at Stow-on-the-Wold; but he had to undergo his share of the discomforts that were the lot of the vanquished royalists. He was imprisoned initially but able to retire to Maidstone. He died in February 1652. The barony became extinct in 1688.

== Notes ==
Peerage of England
New creation	Baron Astley of Reading; 1644–1652	Succeeded by Isaac Astley
