= Henry Jones (bishop) =

Welsh-Irish Anglican priest (c.1605–1681)

Henry Jones (c.1605 – 5 January 1681) was the Anglican Bishop of Clogher and Bishop of Meath.

== Early life ==
He was born in Wales, eldest of the five sons of Lewis Jones, Bishop of Killaloe and Mabel Ussher. His brothers included Michael Jones, Governor of Dublin and Ambrose Jones, Bishop of Kildare. He was educated at Trinity College, Dublin, graduating B.A. in 1621 and M.A. in 1624.

== Career ==
In 1625 he succeeded his father as dean of Ardagh until he was appointed Dean of Kilmore in 1637. In 1638 he was also collated Archdeacon of Kilmore.

=== Irish Rebellion ===
During the Irish Rebellion of 1641 he was forced to surrender his castle at Belananagh, County Cavan to the O'Reillys. Whilst in captivity he offered to go to Dublin to present a petition on behalf of the rebels, where he was able to report on their plans. In December 1641 he was able to escape with his family to Dublin. He then did much to mitigate the sufferings of the Protestants during the war, including making a trip to London to collect money for their relief. He served as the head of a "Commission for the Dispoiled Subject" which documented losses of Loyalists at the hands of the Irish rebels; Jones presented a report to the British House of Commons in March 1642, and in 1652 published An Abstract of some few of those barbarous, cruell massacres and murthers of the Protestants and English in some parts of Ireland, drawn from the commission's depositions.

=== Bishop ===
On 27 October 1645, he was raised to the episcopacy as the bishop of Clogher on the recommendation of the Marquis of Ormonde and was consecrated in Christ Church, Dublin, on 9 November. He was allowed to retain the archdeaconry of Killaloe and other preferments in commendam. In the following year, he was appointed Vice-Chancellor of the University of Dublin, to which he presented the Book of Durrow and the Book of Kells, and in 1651 the exotically designed oak staircases which led to the gallery of the new library. In 1657 he was appointed the principal trustee of an educational trust established by Erasmus Smith. On 25 May 1661 he was translated to the bishopric of Meath. The sermon he gave at the consecration of his brother Ambrose as Bishop of Kildare in June 1667 was published.

He was an ardent Protestant, and in the 1670s was involved in the downfall of Oliver Plunkett, the Roman Catholic Archbishop of Armagh.

Jones died in Dublin in 1681/2, and was buried the following day in St. Andrew's Church. He had married a niece of Archbishop James Ussher, and had several children, some of whom became Roman Catholics. His daughter Mary married Sir Henry Piers, 1st Baronet.
