= Edward Howard, 1st Baron Lanerton =

Royal Navy Admiral and politician (1809–1880)

Admiral The Right Honourable The Lord Lanerton

Member of Parliament for Morpeth
- In office 1833-1837; 1840-1852

Personal details
- Born: 23 December 1809
- Died: 8 October 1880 (aged 70)
- Party: Whig
- Spouse: Diana Ponsonby (m. 1842)
- Parents: George Howard (father); Georgina Cavendish (mother)
- Relatives: George Howard (brother); Harriet Sutherland-Leveson-Gower (sister); William Howard (brother); Blanche Cavendish (sister); Charles Howard (brother); William Cavendish (grandfather); Georgiana Spencer (grandmother); Frederick Howard (grandfather)
- Military career
- Branch: Royal Navy
- Rank: Admiral

Admiral Edward Granville George Howard, 1st Baron Lanerton (23 December 1809 – 8 October 1880), was a British naval commander and politician.

== Background ==
Howard was the fourth son of George Howard, 6th Earl of Carlisle, and his wife Lady Georgiana Dorothy, daughter of William Cavendish, 5th Duke of Devonshire. George Howard, 7th Earl of Carlisle, was his elder brother.

== Naval and political career ==
He served in the Royal Navy and achieved the rank of admiral in 1870, and also sat as Whig Member of Parliament for Morpeth from 1833 to 1837 and from 1840 to 1852. In 1874 he was raised to the peerage as Baron Lanerton, of Lanerton in the County of Cumberland.

== Personal life ==
Lord Lanerton married Diana, daughter of the Hon. George Ponsonby, in 1842. The marriage was childless. He died in October 1880, aged 70, when the barony became extinct. Lady Lanerton died in 1893.

== See also ==
- O'Byrne, William Richard (1849). "Howard, Edward Granville George" . A Naval Biographical Dictionary . John Murray – via Wikisource.

Parliament of the United Kingdom
Preceded by Frederick George Howard	Member of Parliament for Morpeth; 1833–1837	Succeeded by Lord Leveson
Preceded by Viscount Leveson	Member of Parliament for Morpeth; 1840–1852	Succeeded by Sir George Grey, Bt
Peerage of the United Kingdom
New creation	Baron Lanerton; 1874–1880	Extinct
