= George Howard, 7th Earl of Carlisle =

British statesman, orator, and writer (1802–1864)

The Right Honourable The Earl of Carlisle KG KP PC
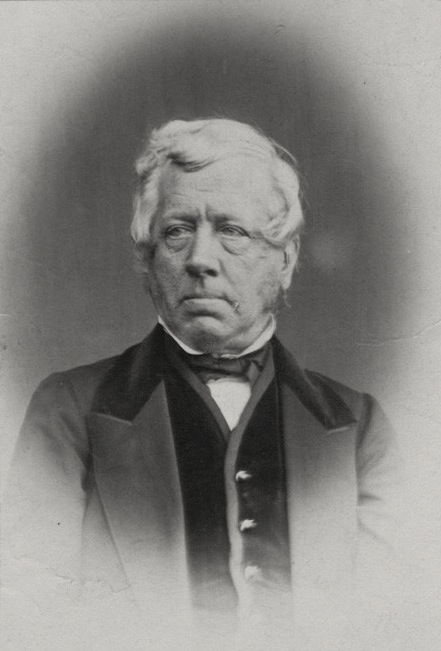
- Carlisle in the 1860s

Chancellor of the Duchy of Lancaster
- In office 6 March 1850 – 21 February 1852
- Monarch: Victoria
- Prime Minister: Lord John Russell
- Preceded by: The Lord Campbell
- Succeeded by: Robert Adam Christopher

Chief Secretary for Ireland
- In office 22 April 1835 – 1841
- Monarchs: William IV; Victoria
- Prime Minister: The Viscount Melbourne
- Preceded by: Sir Henry Hardinge
- Succeeded by: The Lord Eliot

Personal details
- Born: 18 April 1802 Berkeley Square, Westminster, England
- Died: 5 December 1864 (aged 62) Castle Howard, Yorkshire, England
- Party: Whig Party
- Parents: George Howard, 6th Earl of Carlisle (father); Lady Georgiana Cavendish (mother)
- Relatives: Edward Howard (brother); Charles Howard (brother); Frederick Howard (brother); Harriet Howard (sister); William Howard (brother); Blanche Howard (sister)
- Education: Eton College
- Alma mater: Christ Church, Oxford

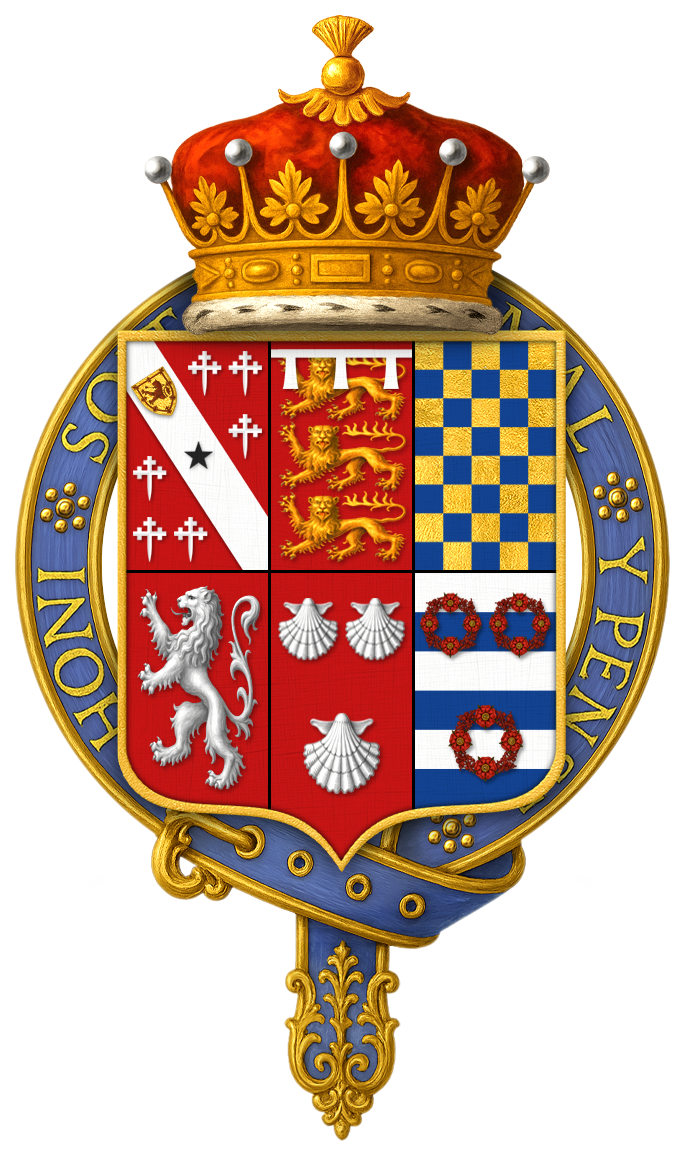
Quartered arms of George Howard, 7th Earl of Carlisle, KG, PC

George William Frederick Howard, 7th Earl of Carlisle (18 April 1802 – 5 December 1864), styled Viscount Morpeth from 1825 to 1848, was a British statesman, orator, and writer.

== Life ==
Carlisle was born in Westminster, London, the eldest son of George Howard, 6th Earl of Carlisle by his wife Lady Georgiana Cavendish, eldest daughter of William Cavendish, 5th Duke of Devonshire. Lord Lanerton and Charles Howard were his younger brothers. He was educated at Eton and Christ Church, Oxford, where he earned a reputation as a scholar and writer of graceful verse, obtaining in 1821 both the chancellor's and the Newdigate prizes for a Latin poem, Paestum, and an English one. He maintained his interest in poetry throughout his life, exchanging sonnets with William Wordsworth. In 1826 he accompanied his maternal uncle, the Duke of Devonshire, to the Russian Empire, to attend the coronation of Tsar Nicholas I, and became a great favourite in society at St Petersburg.

At the general election in 1826 Carlisle was returned to parliament as member for the family borough of Morpeth (in Northumberland), a seat he held until 1830, and then represented Yorkshire until 1832 and the West Riding of Yorkshire from 1832 to 1841 and from 1846 to 1848. The latter year he succeeded his father in the earldom and entered the House of Lords.

Carlisle served under Lord Melbourne as Chief Secretary for Ireland between 1835 and 1841, under Lord John Russell as First Commissioner of Woods and Forests from 1846 to 1850 and as Chancellor of the Duchy of Lancaster from 1850 to 1852 and under Lord Palmerston as Lord Lieutenant of Ireland from 1855 to 1858 and again from 1859 to 1864. In 1835 he was appointed to the Privy Councils of the United Kingdom and Ireland. He served as a Lord in Waiting to the Queen's mother, the Duchess of Kent at the coronation of Queen Victoria in 1838.

On 2 April 1853, he was given the Freedom of the City of Edinburgh, and in 1855, he was made a Knight of the Garter.

In the six weeks after he stepped down as Chief Secretary of Ireland in 1841, the signatures of 160,000 men and women who appreciated his service were gathered on 652 sheets of paper and stuck together, creating the Morpeth Roll, a continuous roll measuring 420 metres.

Lord Carlisle died unmarried at Castle Howard in December 1864, aged 62, and was buried in the family mausoleum. He was succeeded in the earldom by his younger brother, Reverend William George Howard.

== Legacy ==
On Bulmer Hill, about a mile from Bulmer village in North Yorkshire, is the Carlisle Memorial Column, erected by public subscription to his memory in 1869–70. It is inscribed:

AD MDCCCLXIX: IN PRIVATE LIFE WAS LOVED
BY ALL WHO KNEW HIM
BY HIS PUBLIC CONDUCT
WON the RESPECT of his COUNTRY
and LEFT THE BRIGHT EXAMPLE
OF A TRVE PATRIOT
AND EARNEST CHRISTIAN
VIIth EARL of CARLISLE

Statues of him by the Irish sculptor John Henry Foley were also erected in Phoenix Park, Dublin, and in Brampton, Carlisle in Cumbria, both in 1870. The statue in Brampton stands on Brampton motte and depicts him in the robes of a Knight of the Garter. The statue in Phoenix Park stood in the Peoples' Garden until 1956, when it was blown off its plinth in an explosion, and subsequently removed to Castle Howard in Yorkshire. The plinth it once stood on remains in place.

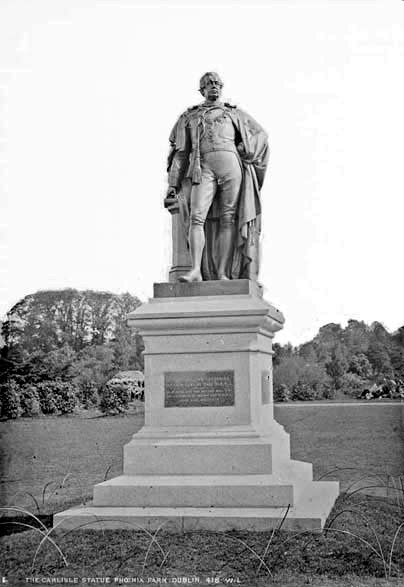
The statue of Lord Carlisle, which stood in the Phoenix Park, Dublin, from 1870 to 1956

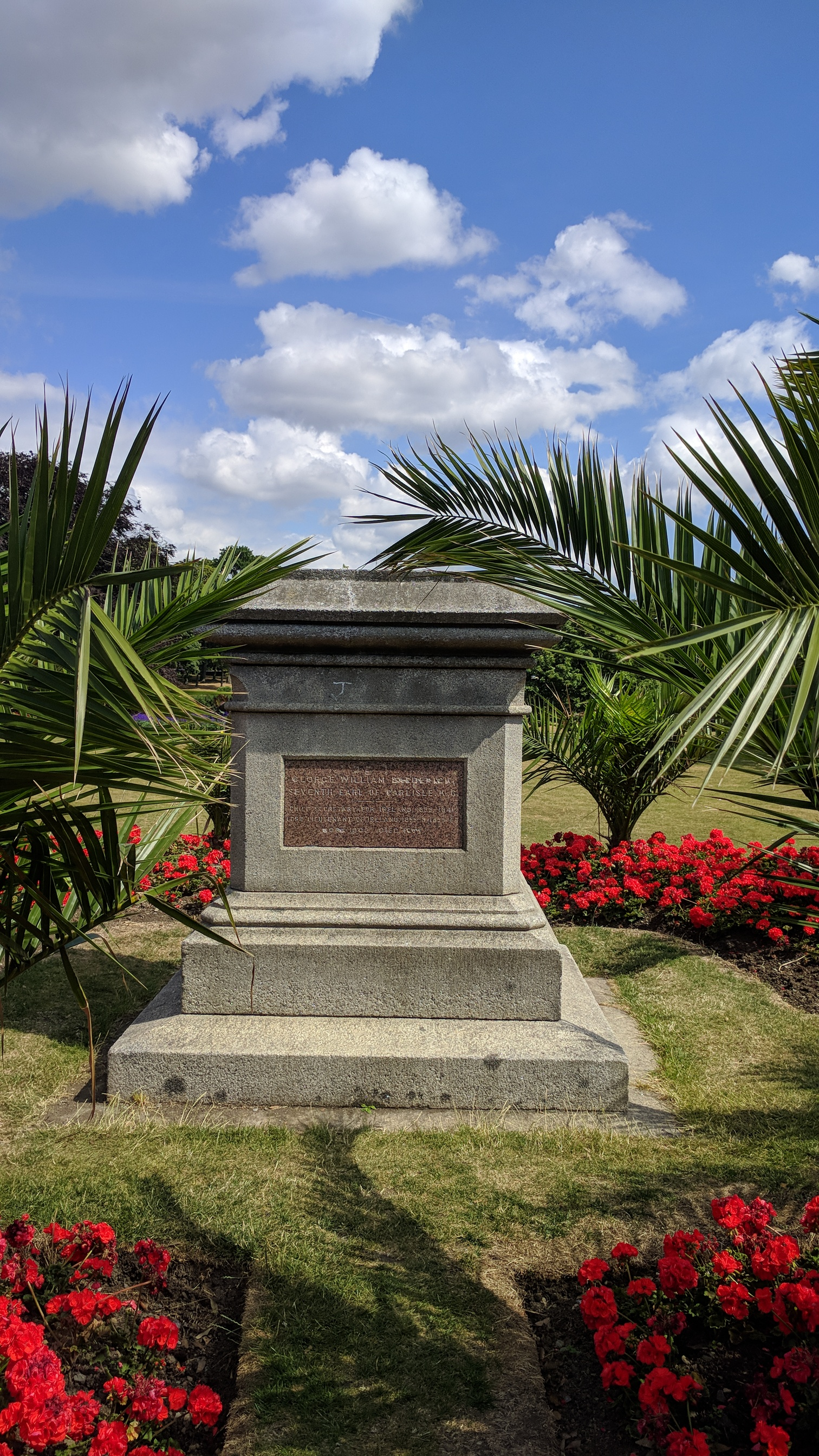
The plinth of the former statue today

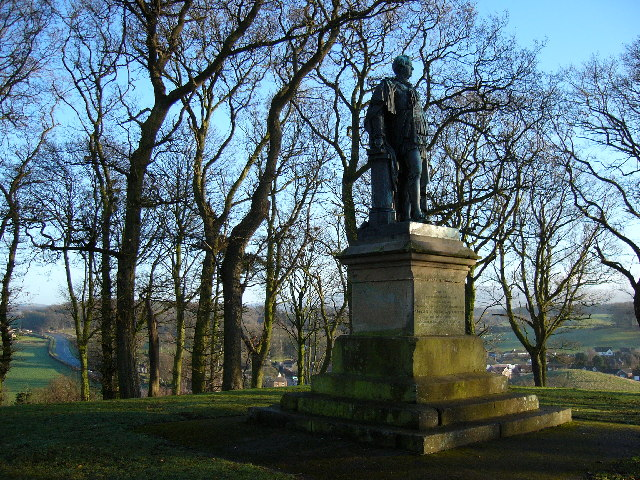
Statue of Lord Carlisle on Brampton Motte

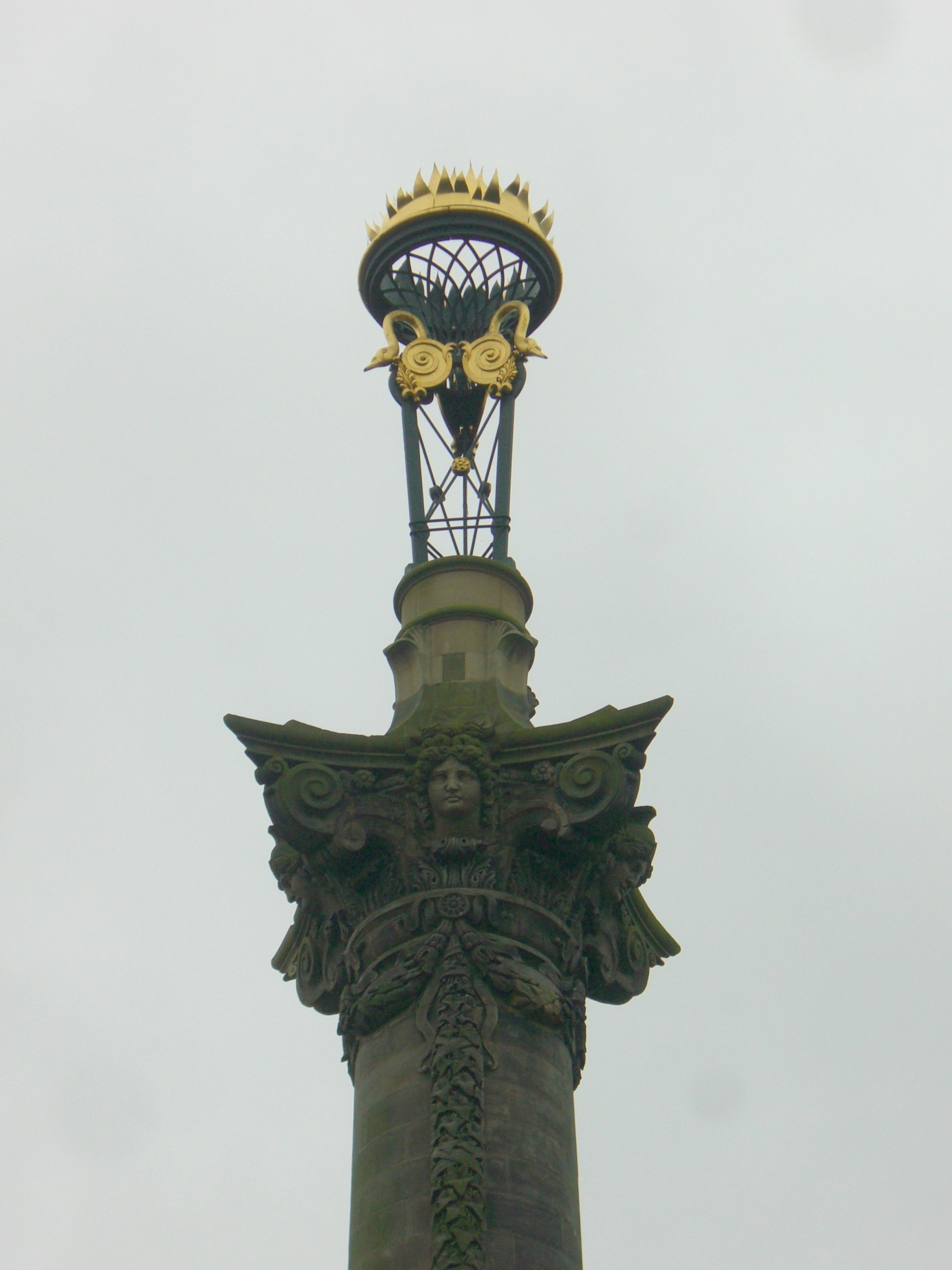
Obelisk at top of Bulmer Hill

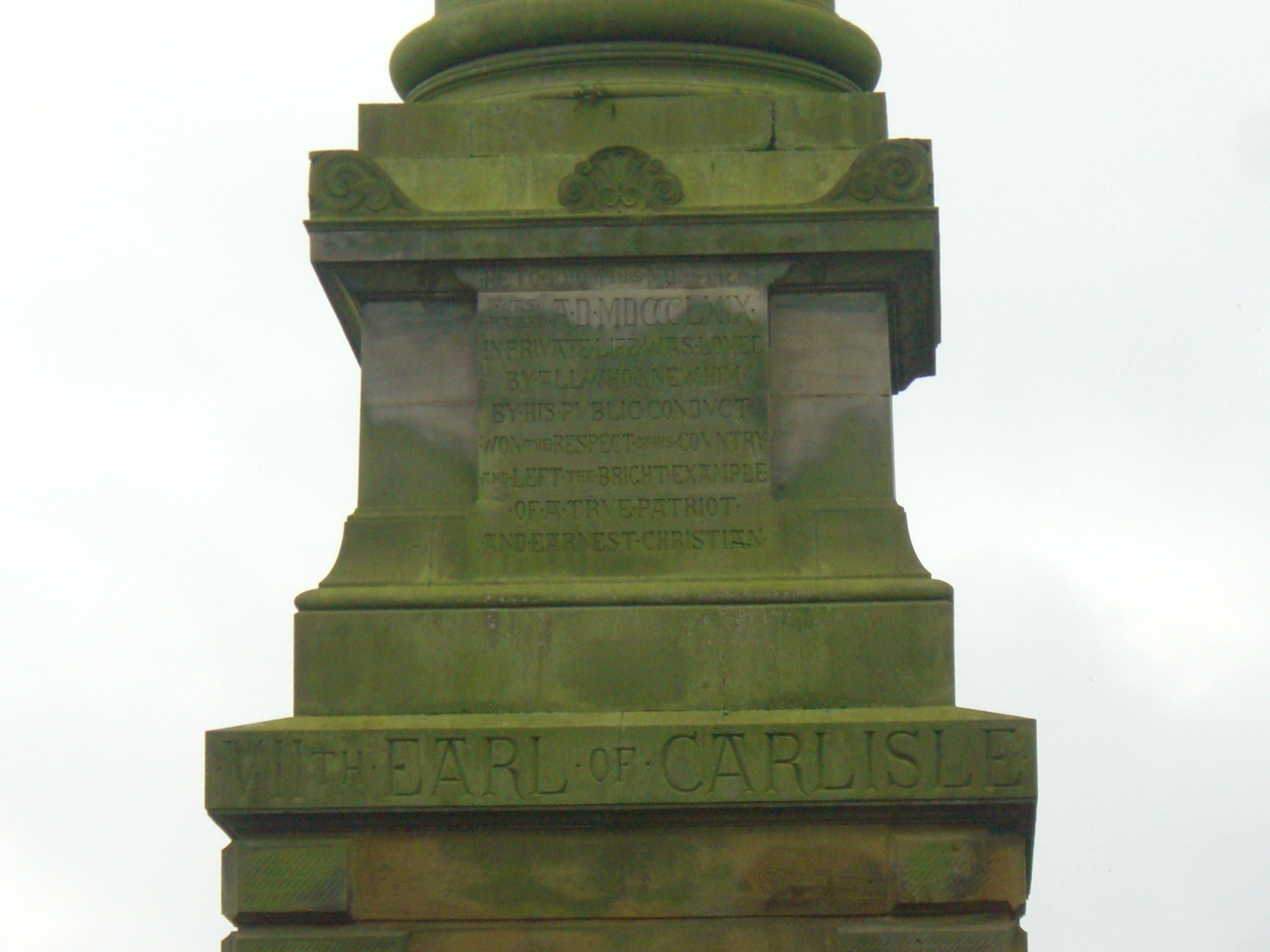
Inscription on obelisk (see text)

== See also ==
- Column of the Temple of Poseidon at Chatsworth

Parliament of the United Kingdom
Preceded by William Ord; Hon. William Howard	Member of Parliament for Morpeth; 1826–1830; With: William Ord	Succeeded by William Ord; Hon. William Howard
Preceded by Viscount Milton; William Duncombe; Richard Fountayne-Wilson; John Marshall	Member of Parliament for Yorkshire; 1830–1832; With: William Duncombe 1830–1831; Henry Brougham 1830; Richard Bethell 1830–1831; Sir John Vanden-Bempde-Johnstone, Bt 1830–1832; George Strickland 1831–1832; John Charles Ramsden 1831–1832	constituency divided
New constituency	Member of Parliament for the West Riding of Yorkshire; 1832–1841; With: Sir George Strickland, Bt	Succeeded by Hon. John Stuart-Wortley-Mackenzie; Edmund Beckett Denison
Preceded by Hon. John Stuart-Wortley-Mackenzie; Edmund Beckett Denison	Member of Parliament for the West Riding of Yorkshire; 1846–1848; With: Edmund Beckett Denison 1846–1847; Richard Cobden 1847–1848	Succeeded by Richard Cobden; Edmund Beckett Denison
Political offices
Preceded by Sir Henry Hardinge	Chief Secretary for Ireland; 1835–1841	Succeeded by Lord Eliot
Preceded by The Earl Canning	First Commissioner of Woods and Forests; 1846–1850	Succeeded by Lord Seymour
Preceded by The Lord Campbell	Chancellor of the Duchy of Lancaster; 1850–1852	Succeeded by Robert Adam Christopher
Preceded by The Earl of St Germans	Lord Lieutenant of Ireland; 1855–1858	Succeeded by The Earl of Eglinton
Preceded by The Earl of Eglinton	Lord Lieutenant of Ireland; 1859–1864	Succeeded by The Lord Wodehouse
Academic offices
Preceded by The Earl of Eglinton	Rector of Marischal College, Aberdeen; 1853–54	Succeeded by William Henry Sykes
Honorary titles
Preceded by The Lord Wenlock	Lord Lieutenant of the East Riding of Yorkshire; 1847–1864	Succeeded by The Lord Wenlock
Peerage of the United Kingdom
Preceded by George Howard	Earl of Carlisle; 1848–1864	Succeeded by William George Howard
