= Frederick George Howard =

British politician

Capt. Hon. Frederick George Howard (8 June 1805 – 18 November 1834) was a British politician and soldier from the aristocratic Howard family.

Howard was the second son of George Howard, 6th Earl of Carlisle, and Georgiana Howard, Countess of Carlisle (née Lady Georgiana Dorothy Cavendish), eldest daughter of the 5th Duke of Devonshire and his wife Georgiana Cavendish, Duchess of Devonshire (née Lady Georgiana Spencer).

== Career ==
Howard served as a captain in the 90th Regiment of Foot. He stood in the 1832 UK general election in Morpeth. He won election as a Whig, and focused on free trade and the abolition of monopolies.

== Death ==
In 1834, while stationed at Stephens Barracks in Kilkenny, Howard was travelling in a curricle near Bagenalstown, when the horse bolted. He attempted to jump clear of the vehicle, but hit his head hard and died two days later.

Had he survived three more decades, he would have succeeded his elder brother, George Howard, 7th Earl of Carlisle, who died unmarried in 1862. His younger brother William George Howard, 8th Earl of Carlisle instead succeeded.

Parliament of the United Kingdom
Preceded by William Ord; William Howard	Member of Parliament for Morpeth; 1832–1833	Succeeded by Edward Howard
