= George Howard, 6th Earl of Carlisle =

British politician

The Right Honourable The Earl of Carlisle KG PC FRS
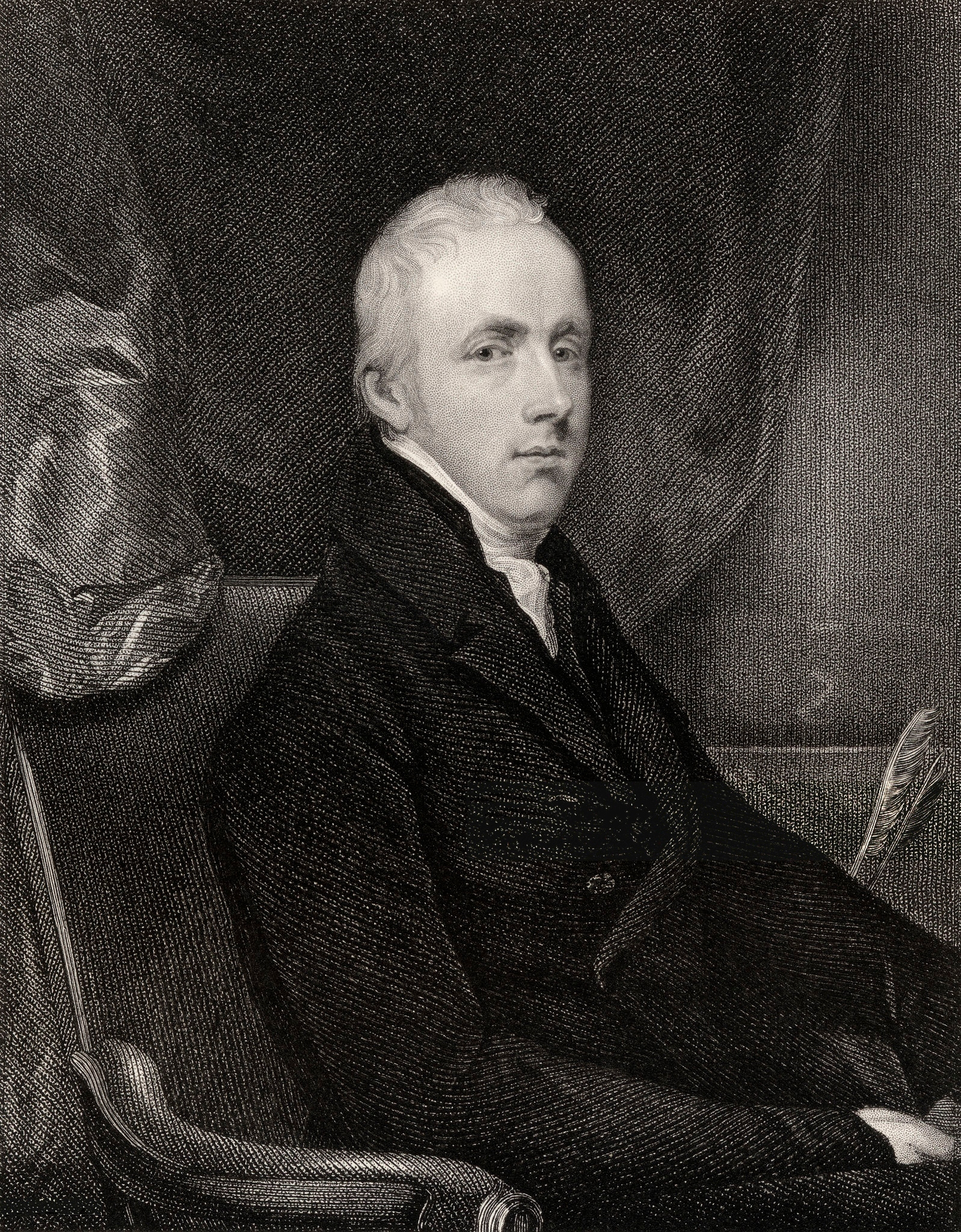
- Engraving of The Earl of Carlisle

Lord Privy Seal
- In office 16 July 1827 – 21 January 1828
- Monarch: George IV
- Prime Minister: George Canning; The Viscount Goderich
- Preceded by: The Duke of Portland
- Succeeded by: The Lord Ellenborough
- In office 5 June 1834 – 14 November 1834
- Monarch: William IV
- Prime Minister: The Viscount Melbourne
- Preceded by: The Earl of Ripon
- Succeeded by: The Earl of Mulgrave

Personal details
- Born: 17 September 1773 London, England
- Died: 7 October 1848 (aged 75) Castle Howard, Yorkshire, England
- Party: Tory; Whig
- Spouse: Lady Georgiana Cavendish (m. 1801)
- Children: George Howard, 7th Earl of Carlisle; Lady Caroline Lascelles; Georgiana Agar-Ellis, Baroness Dover; Hon. Frederick Howard; Harriet Sutherland-Leveson-Gower, Duchess of Sutherland; William George Howard, 8th Earl of Carlisle; Edward Howard, 1st Baron Lanerton; Blanche Cavendish, Countess of Burlington; Hon. Charles Howard; Lady Elizabeth Grey; Hon. Henry George Howard; Mary Labouchere, Baroness Taunton
- Parent(s): Frederick Howard, 5th Earl of Carlisle; Lady Margaret Leveson-Gower
- Education: Eton College; Christ Church, Oxford

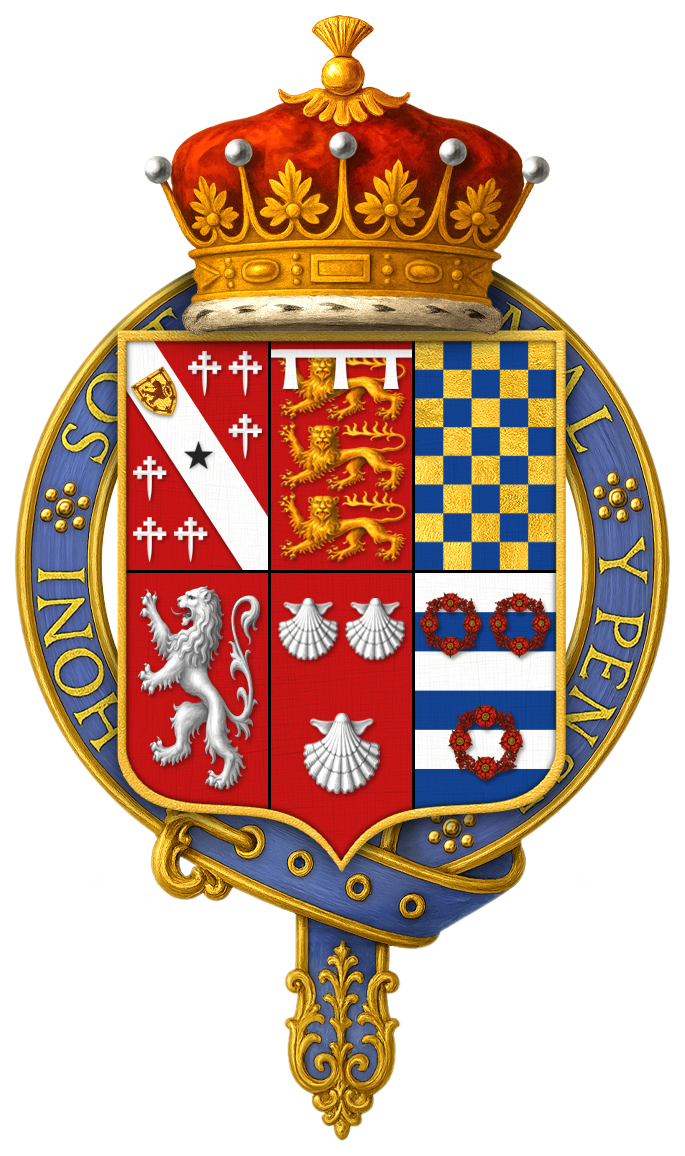
Quartered arms of George Howard, 6th Earl of Carlisle, KG, PC, FRS

George Howard, 6th Earl of Carlisle (17 September 1773 – 7 October 1848), styled Viscount Morpeth until 1825, was a British statesman. He served as Lord Privy Seal between 1827 and 1828 and in 1834 and was a member of Lord Grey's Whig government as Minister without Portfolio between 1830 and 1834.

== Early life ==
Carlisle was the eldest son of Frederick Howard, 5th Earl of Carlisle of Castle Howard, and his wife Lady Margaret Caroline Leveson-Gower, Among his siblings were brothers: Hon. William Howard, Maj. Hon. Frederick Howard, and the Very Rev. Hon. Henry Howard, Dean of Lichfield; and sisters: Lady Isabella Howard (wife of John Campbell, 1st Baron Cawdor), Lady Elizabeth Howard (wife of John Manners, 5th Duke of Rutland), and Lady Gertrude Howard (wife of William Sloane-Stanley).

His paternal grandparents were Henry Howard, 4th Earl of Carlisle and, his second wife, Hon Isabella Byron (daughter of William Byron, 4th Baron Byron and relative of Lord Byron). His mother was daughter of Granville Leveson-Gower, 1st Marquess of Stafford and his wife Lady Louisa, eldest daughter and co-heiress of Scroop Egerton, 1st Duke of Bridgewater.

He was educated at Eton and Christ Church, Oxford.

== Political career ==
Carlisle was returned to parliament for Morpeth as a Whig in 1795, a seat he held until 1806; he then represented Cumberland until 1820. In 1806 he was sworn on to the Privy Council and appointed to the Indian board in the unity "Ministry of All the Talents", but resigned in 1807. In 1825 he succeeded his father in the earldom and he entered the House of Lords.

He served in the moderate Tory governments of George Canning and Lord Goderich as First Commissioner of Woods and Forests between May and July 1827 and as Lord Privy Seal (with a seat in the cabinet) between July 1827 and January 1828. However, he split with the Tories over electoral reform and later served as a member of the cabinet in the Whig administrations of Lord Grey and Lord Melbourne as Minister without Portfolio between 1830 and 1834 and once again as Lord Privy Seal between July and November 1834.

Apart from his political career Carlisle was Lord Lieutenant of the East Riding of Yorkshire between 1824 and 1840. He was made a Knight of the Garter in 1837.

== Family ==
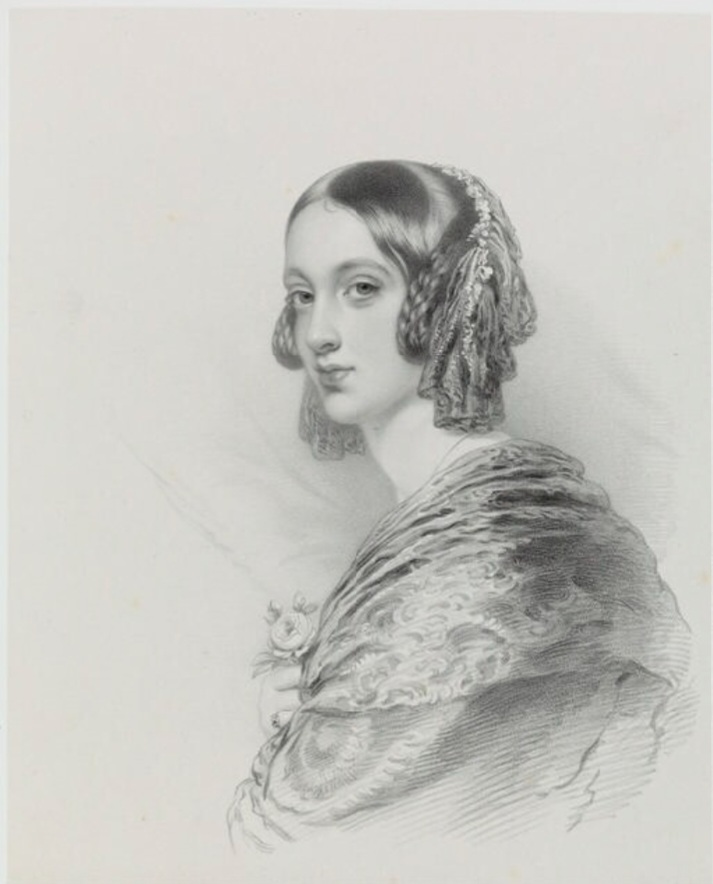
His daughter, Lady Elizabeth Grey

On 21 March 1801, Lord Carlisle was married to Lady Georgiana Cavendish (1783–1858), daughter of William Cavendish, 5th Duke of Devonshire and Lady Georgiana Spencer (the eldest daughter of John Spencer, 1st Earl Spencer). They were parents of twelve children:

1. George Howard, 7th Earl of Carlisle (1802–1864), who did not marry.
2. Lady Caroline Georgiana Howard (1803–1881), who married William Lascelles, Comptroller of the Household.
3. Lady Georgiana Howard (1804–1860), who married George Agar-Ellis, 1st Baron Dover.
4. Hon. Frederick George Howard (1805–1834), who died unmarried before his father.
5. Lady Harriet Elizabeth Georgiana Howard (1806–1868), who married George Sutherland-Leveson-Gower, 2nd Duke of Sutherland.
6. William George Howard, 8th Earl of Carlisle (1808–1889), who did not marry.
7. Edward Granville George Howard, 1st Baron Lanerton (1809–1880), who married Diana Ponsonby, daughter of the Hon. George Ponsonby.
8. Lady Blanche Georgiana Howard (1812–1840), who married William Cavendish, later Earl of Burlington and Duke of Devonshire.
9. Hon. Charles Wentworth George Howard (1814–1879), who married Mary Parke, daughter of James Parke, Baron Wensleydale. They were parents of George Howard, 9th Earl of Carlisle.
10. Lady Elizabeth Dorothy Anne Howard (1816–1891), who married Rev. Francis Richard Grey, son of Charles Grey, 2nd Earl Grey.
11. Hon. Henry George Howard (1818–1879), who married Mary Wellesley McTavish in 1845 at the house of her aunt, the Marchioness Wellesley. Mary was the daughter of John McTavish, British Consul at Baltimore, and Emily Caton (daughter of Richard Caton and granddaughter of Charles Carroll of Carrollton). He served as Secretary of the British Embassy in Paris. His wife died in Paris 21 February 1850, in her 23rd year.
12. Lady Mary Matilda Georgiana Howard (1823–1892), who married Henry Labouchere, 1st Baron Taunton.

Lord Carlisle died at Castle Howard, Yorkshire, in October 1848, aged 75, and was succeeded in the earldom by his eldest son, George. The Countess of Carlisle died at Castle Howard in August 1858, aged 75.

As his eldest son died unmarried and without legitimate issue, his third son became the 8th Earl of Carlisle in 1864. He also died unmarried and without legitimate issue, so the 9th Earl of Carlisle was his grandson, George James Howard, the only son of his fifth son Charles, whose descendants hold the titles to this day.

Parliament of Great Britain
Preceded by Sir James Erskine, Bt; Francis Gregg	Member of Parliament for Morpeth; 1795–1801; With: Sir James Erskine, Bt 1795–1796; William Huskisson 1796–1801	Succeeded by Parliament of the United Kingdom
Parliament of the United Kingdom
Preceded by Parliament of Great Britain	Member of Parliament for Morpeth; 1801–1806; With: William Huskisson 1801–1802; William Ord 1802–1806	Succeeded by William Ord; William Howard
Preceded by Henry Fletcher; Sir John Lowther, Bt	Member of Parliament for Cumberland; 1806–1820; With: Sir John Lowther, Bt	Succeeded by Sir John Lowther, Bt; John Christian Curwen
Political offices
Preceded by Charles Arbuthnot	First Commissioner of Woods and Forests; 1827	Succeeded by William Sturges Bourne
Preceded by The Duke of Portland	Lord Privy Seal; 1827–1828	Succeeded by The Lord Ellenborough
Preceded by –	Minister without Portfolio; 1830–1834	Succeeded by –
Preceded by The Earl of Ripon	Lord Privy Seal; 1834	Succeeded by The Earl of Mulgrave
Honorary titles
Preceded by The Earl of Mulgrave	Lord Lieutenant of the East Riding of Yorkshire; 1824–1840	Succeeded by The Lord Wenlock
Peerage of England
Preceded by Frederick Howard	Earl of Carlisle; 1825–1848	Succeeded by George Howard
