= Arthur Welshe =

16th-century English politician

Arthur Welshe (fl. 1563) was an English politician.

== Life ==
Welshe's life remains obscure. There are other Welshes within Morpeth, Northumberland at this time, indicating that he was probably a local man, and probably a burgess of the town.

== Career ==
He was a member (MP) of the parliament of England for Morpeth in 1563.

Parliament of England
| Preceded by William Ward with Nicholas Purslow | Member of Parliament for Morpeth; 1563; With: William Ward | Succeeded by Francis Gawdy with Nicholas Mynn |
