= Elizabeth Manners, Duchess of Rutland =

English aristocrat

Her Grace The Duchess of Rutland
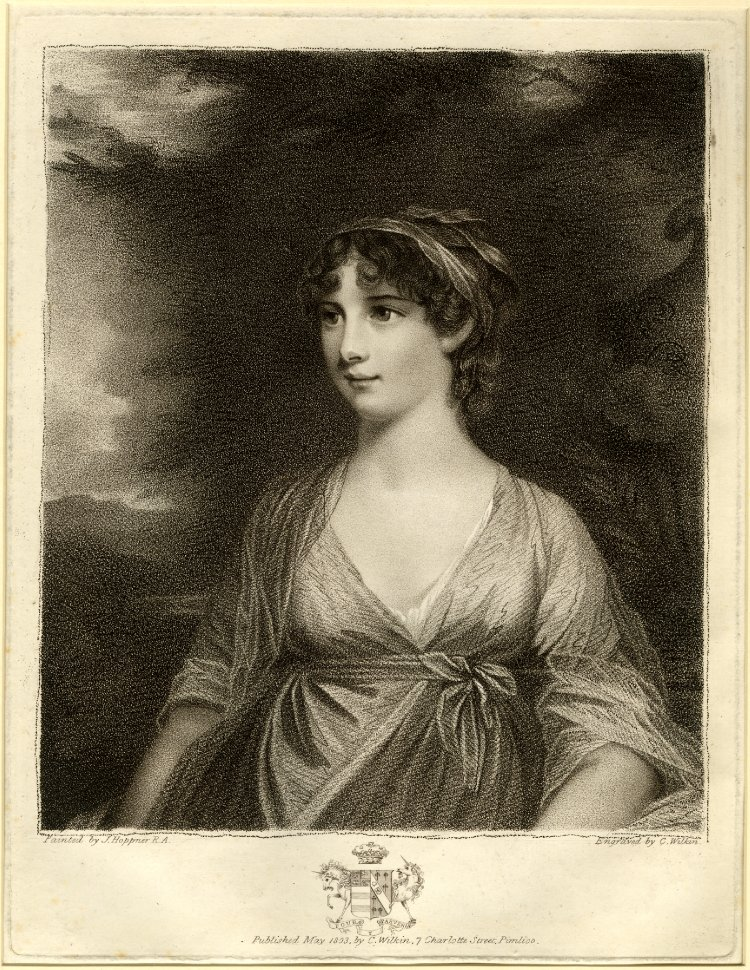
- Elizabeth Howard
- Born: Elizabeth Howard; 13 November 1780
- Died: 29 November 1825 (aged 45)
- Spouse: John Manners, 5th Duke of Rutland (m. 1799; died 1825)
- Children: Lady Caroline Manners; Lady Elizabeth Drummond; Lady Emmeline Stuart-Wortley-Mackenzie; George Manners, Marquess of Granby; Katherine Hervey, Marchioness of Bristol; Lady Adeliza Manners; George Manners, Marquess of Granby; Charles Manners, 6th Duke of Rutland; John Manners, 7th Duke of Rutland; Lord George Manners
- Parents: Frederick Howard, 5th Earl of Carlisle; Lady Margaret Leveson-Gower
- Family: Howard

Elizabeth Manners, Duchess of Rutland (née Howard; 13 November 1780 – 29 November 1825) was an English aristocrat.

== Early life ==
Lady Elizabeth Howard was born on 13 November 1780. She was the daughter of Lady Margaret Caroline Leveson-Gower and Frederick Howard, 5th Earl of Carlisle, who served as Treasurer of the Household and First Lord of Trade. Among her siblings were Lady Isabella Caroline Howard (wife of John Campbell, 1st Baron Cawdor), George Howard, 6th Earl of Carlisle, William Howard, MP, Lady Gertrude Howard (wife of William Sloane-Stanley), Maj. Frederick Howard, and the Rev. Henry Howard.

Her paternal grandparents were Henry Howard, 4th Earl of Carlisle and Isabella Byron (a daughter of William Byron, 4th Baron Byron and the former Frances Berkeley). Her maternal grandparents were Granville Leveson-Gower, 1st Marquess of Stafford and the former Lady Louisa Egerton (a daughter of Scroop Egerton, 1st Duke of Bridgewater).

== Personal life ==
On 22 April 1799, Lady Elizabeth married John Manners, 5th Duke of Rutland, who had succeeded to his father's dukedom in 1787 when he was still a child. He was the eldest son of Charles Manners, 4th Duke of Rutland, by Lady Mary Isabella Somerset (a daughter of Charles Somerset, 4th Duke of Beaufort). Together, they were the parents of ten children:

- Lady Caroline Isabella Manners (1800–1804), who died young.
- Lady Elizabeth Frederica Manners (1801–1886), who married Andrew Robert Drummond of Cadland Park (great-grandson of William Drummond, 4th Viscount Strathallan), and had seven children.
- Lady Emmeline Charlotte Elizabeth Manners (1806–1855), who married Charles Stuart-Wortley-Mackenzie and had three children.
- George John Henry Manners, styled Marquess of Granby (1807–1807), who died young.
- Lady Katherine Isabella Manners (1809–1848), who married Frederick Hervey, 2nd Marquess of Bristol, and had seven children.
- Lady Adeliza Elizabeth Gertrude Manners (1810–1877), who married her cousin Rev. Canon Frederick John Norman, Rector of Bottesford, and had one daughter.
- George John Frederick Manners, Marquess of Granby (1813–1814), who died young.
- Charles Cecil John Manners, 6th Duke of Rutland (1815–1888), a Conservative politician who died unmarried.
- John James Robert Manners, 7th Duke of Rutland (1818–1906), who first married Catherine Marley and had one son; his second wife was Janetta Hughan, and they had four children.
- Lord George John Manners (1820–1874), who married Adeliza Fitzalan-Howard, a daughter of Henry Fitzalan-Howard, 13th Duke of Norfolk, and had five children.

Duchess of Rutland died, aged 45, of "an inflammation of the chest", and was buried in the family vault at Bottesford. Duke of Rutland remained a widower until his death at Belvoir Castle, Leicestershire, in January 1857, aged 79.

=== Legacy ===
A statue of her was later erected at the castle. A pencil portrait of her, by Henry Bone, after John Hoppner, is held by the National Portrait Gallery.

=== Estate management ===
The Duchess's interests included gardening and estate management. She took forward improvements begun by her father-in-law, Charles Manners, 4th Duke of Rutland, but interrupted when he went bankrupt. She supervised landscaping works at Belvoir Castle and included a model farm. A fire in 1816 almost destroyed the castle. The rebuilding was largely entrusted to the Duchess and cost around £82,000. The Gentleman's Magazine commented that "What many individuals would have required a century to execute, her perseverance in a few years achieved."

Elizabeth also made improvements to Cheveley Park, where her husband's famous stud operated, and influenced the building of York House on the Mall on behalf of Prince Frederick, Duke of York and Albany, the brother of King George IV, with whom she had an intimate relationship.

== Coat of arms ==
Coat of arms of Elizabeth Manners, Duchess of Rutland
Escutcheon Or two bars Azure a chief quarterly Azure and Gules in the 1st and 4th quarters two fleurs-de-lis and in the 2nd and 3rd a lion passant guardant Or (John Manners, 5th Duke of Rutland); impaling Gules on a Bend between six Crosses-Crosslet finchée Argent an Escutcheon Argent charged with a Demi-Lion pierced through the mouth with an arrow within a double tressure flory counterflory all Gules and above the escutcheon a mullet Sable for difference (Frederick Howard, 5th Earl of Carlisle).
