= Thomas Bates (disambiguation) =

Thomas Bates (1567–1606) was a member of the Gunpowder Plot.

Thomas Bates may also refer to:

- Thomas Bates (MP) (by 1526–87), MP for Morpeth
- Thomas Bates (surgeon) (fl. 1704–1719), English surgeon
- Thomas Bates (stockbreeder) (1775–1849), English stockbreeder.
- Tom Bates (born 1938), American politician
- Tom Bates (footballer) (born 1985), English footballer
- The 1962 murder of Thomas Bates, a newsagent in Birmingham, England
- Thomas Herbert Bates (1873–1954), New Zealand architect
