= Arthur Welsh =

Arthur Welsh may refer to:

- Arthur L. Welsh (1881–1912), American aviator
- Arthur Welshe (fl. 1560s), MP for Morpeth
- Arthur Welche or Welsh (fl. 1550s), MP for Dunheved

== See also ==
- George Arthur Welsh (1896–1965), Canadian flying ace, farmer and political figure
- Arthur Walsh (disambiguation)
