= 1923 Morpeth by-election =

UK parliamentary by-election

The 1923 Morpeth by-election was a by-election held for the House of Commons constituency of Morpeth in Northumberland on 21 June 1923. The seat had become vacant upon the death in May 1923 of the constituency's Labour Member of Parliament (MP) John Cairns, who had held the seat since the khaki general election of 1918.

== Candidates ==
Labour selected the former leader of the Miners Federation of Great Britain, 66-year old Robert Smillie, a founder of the Independent Labour Party who had stood unsuccessfully at many previous parliamentary elections. Smillie's selection placed many Northumberland miners in a strange position as they had been used to having local miners' candidates to elect to represent them in Cairns and his predecessor, the Liberal Thomas Burt. Smillie on the other hand, was a Scotsman with no links to the local community.

Smillie's only opponent was the Liberal candidate, fifty-year-old Newcastle-based, Frank Thornborough. Unlike Smillie, he could demonstrate commitment to serving the people of Morpeth. Thornborough had been the Liberal candidate at both the last general election, when the Liberals came second and the 1918 khaki general election. He was also a politician of some stature, having been Chairman of the National League of Young Liberals.

The Conservative Party had come third in Morpeth at the 1922 general election, but chose not to field a candidate at this by-election. This was expected to help the Liberal campaign as it was thought that many Conservative voters would not vote for a Scottish socialist. However, for Thornborough to win, he would need to retain his support and pick up virtually all of the Conservative voters support to defeat Smillie.

== Result ==
Smillie held the seat comfortably, with a slightly increased majority;

Morpeth by-election, 1923
Party	Candidate	Votes	%	±%
Labour	Robert Smillie	20,053	60.5	+12.2
Liberal	Frank Crane Thornborough	13,087	39.5	+7.3
Majority		6,966	21.0	+4.9
Turnout		33,140	76.9	+4.8
Labour hold		Swing	+2.4	

== Aftermath ==
Smillie was re-elected at the general election in December 1923 and again at the 1924 general election, but stood down at the 1929 general election due to ill health. Thornborough stood at four other general elections, but was never elected to Parliament.

Morpeth remained a Labour-held constituency until the party split at the 1931 general election, when the Conservative Godfrey Nicholson served one term. Labour's Robert Taylor regained the seat at the 1935 general election, and Morpeth elected successive Labour members until the constituency's abolition for the 1983 general election.

== See also ==
- Morpeth (UK Parliament constituency)
- Morpeth, Northumberland
- List of United Kingdom by-elections (1918–1931)
