= Georgiana Howard, Countess of Carlisle =

British noblewoman (1783–1858)

The Right Honourable The Countess of Carlisle
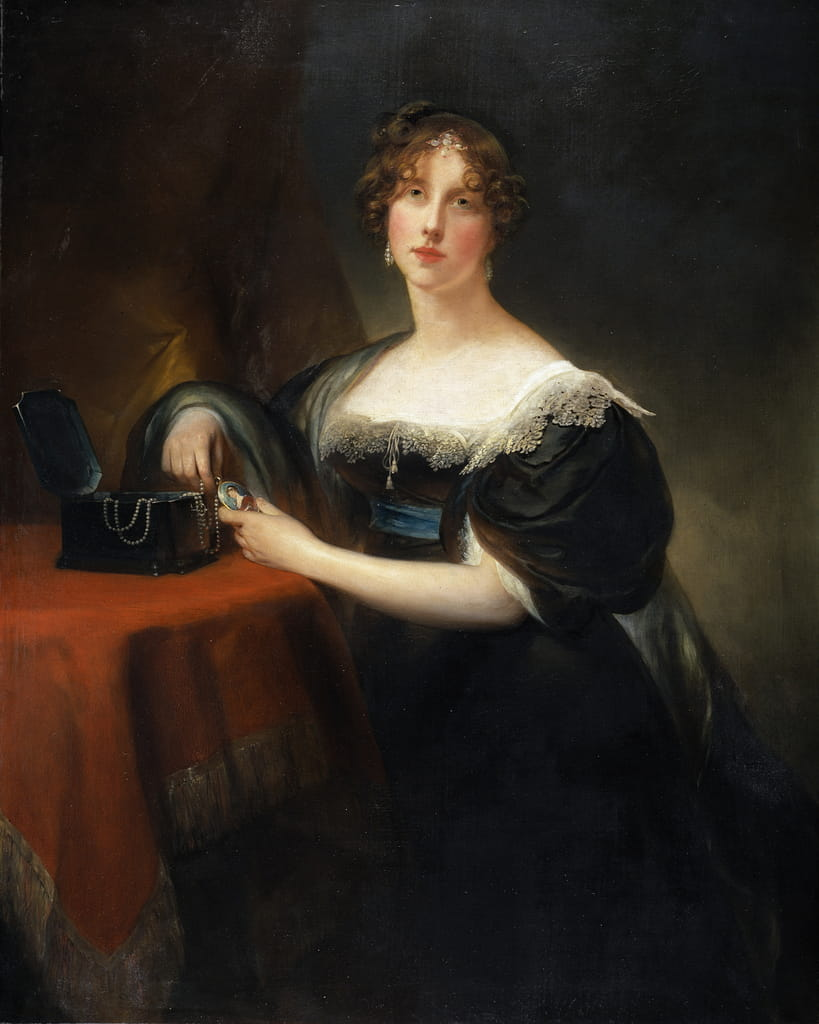
- Lady Georgiana Howard, Countess of Carlisle
- Born: Georgiana Dorothy Cavendish; 12 July 1783; Devonshire House, London
- Died: 8 August 1858 (aged 75); Castle Howard, Malton, Yorkshire
- Spouse: George Howard, 6th Earl of Carlisle (m. 1801; died 1848)
- Issue: George Howard, 7th Earl of Carlisle; Lady Caroline Lascelles; Georgiana Agar-Ellis, Baroness Dover; Hon. Frederick Howard; Harriet Sutherland-Leveson-Gower, Duchess of Sutherland; William George Howard, 8th Earl of Carlisle; Edward Howard, 1st Baron Lanerton; Blanche Cavendish, Countess of Burlington; Hon. Charles Howard; Lady Elizabeth Grey; Hon. Henry George Howard; Mary Labouchere, Baroness Taunton
- Father: William Cavendish, 5th Duke of Devonshire
- Mother: Lady Georgiana Spencer

Georgiana Dorothy Howard, Countess of Carlisle (née Cavendish; 12 July 1783 – 8 August 1858) was a British noblewoman. She was born after nine years of childless marriage between William Cavendish, 5th Duke of Devonshire, and his wife, Lady Georgiana Spencer, the political hostess and socialite. As such, she was a member of one of the country's grandest and richest families.

In 1801, the young Georgiana married George Howard, Viscount Morpeth, later becoming Countess of Carlisle upon her husband's accession in 1825. Their twelve children included the 7th and 8th Earls of Carlisle. Another child, the Duchess of Sutherland, was Mistress of the Robes and a close friend to Queen Victoria.

== Family and early life ==
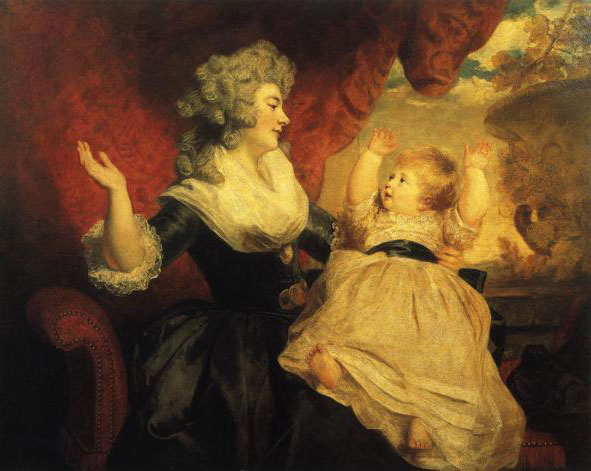
Lady Georgiana with her mother the Duchess of Devonshire

Lady Georgiana Dorothy Cavendish was born on 12 July 1783 at Devonshire House, the eldest child of William Cavendish, 5th Duke of Devonshire, who controlled one of the largest fortunes in England and belonged to one of the country's leading families. Her mother was Lady Georgiana Spencer, the famous political hostess and socialite. The new baby, born during a difficult labour, arrived after nine years of childlessness, and six days after her first cousin Frederick.

Called "Little G" by her mother, the baby was named after Lady Georgiana and her aunt the Duchess of Portland, who also served as a godparent alongside Lord John Cavendish and the Prince of Wales, later George IV. The Duchess of Devonshire chose to breastfeed the infant herself and did not employ a wet nurse, an unusual decision for a member of the upper class; her husband's family was displeased with her choice, as they felt it conflicted with the task of birthing a male heir. A month after her birth, "Little G" was christened alongside her cousin Frederick at the church in Wimbledon Park – the same place the Duke and Duchess married nine years earlier.

The Duke had predicted their first child would be a girl and was disappointed, though the Duchess asserted that at least it proved her capable of bearing a son. The Devonshire title and wealth was still destined to pass to a separate branch of the family unless the couple produced a male heir. A sister, Harriet, was born two years later; the two sisters would remain close all their lives. In 1790 the Duke and Duchess finally had a son, William Cavendish, Marquess of Hartington.

In the early 1790s, the Duke and Duchess separated after she bore an illegitimate child (Eliza Courtney) to her lover, Charles, Earl Grey. She went to the continent, only returning in late 1793. The Duchess had not seen her children for two years, and observed upon her return that "Georgiana is very handsome" while Harriet was "still fat" and William "very cruel to me". The Duchess was also saddened to find that Little G, then ten-years old, lacked self-confidence. The young girl would not let her mother out of her sight, and had developed strong religious sensibilities centring on her own perceived sins. The two shared a love of books and other interests; the Duchess's biographer, Amanda Foreman, writes "Georgiana treasured Little G's company so greatly that she could never bear to say a harsh word towards her".

In 1800, the Duchess prepared Little G for her presentation at court. The task was difficult; débutantes were expected to display grace and dignity or face the ruin of their first London season. However, young Georgiana had not inherited her mother's poise and ease of movement, and tended to keep her head down. Her court dress, complemented with the Cavendish diamonds, was considered a dramatic success. Soon after, she came out in society during a ball held in her honour. Lady Holland observed Georgiana and described her as "a most charming girl–sensible, pleasing, full of information and totally without a particle of affectation, and if she bestows herself upon a man equal to her situation, I have no doubt she will make a most delightful wife".

== Marriage ==
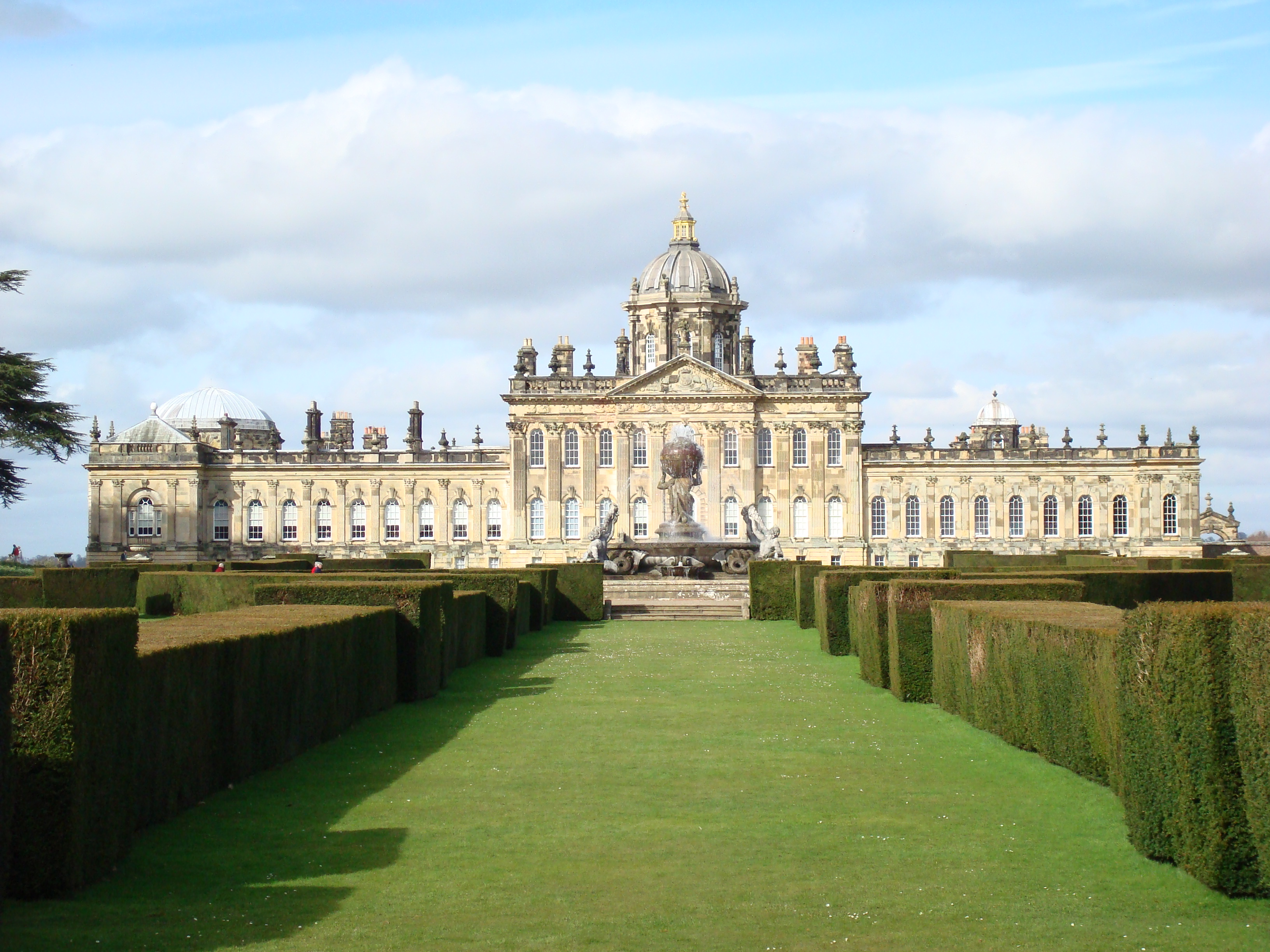
Castle Howard in Yorkshire, seat of Earl and Countess of Carlisle

Potential suitors in marriage included Lord John Russell and George Howard, Viscount Morpeth. Russell was nearly twenty years older than Georgiana, while Howard was approximately eleven years her senior. The Duchess of Devonshire favoured Morpeth, who was the eldest son of the 5th Earl of Carlisle. Morpeth met Georgiana for the first time at the coming out ball, and he was invited back to a house party at Chatsworth House later that year. No engagement occurred, however; to convince his daughter to agree to the match, the Duke of Devonshire offered Georgiana a £30,000 dowry and the use of their London residence Londesborough House. She did not agree until Christmas later that year, marrying Morpeth on 21 March 1801 when she was seventeen. Lady Holland characterised it as "a suitable match in every respect. Without possessing great beauty she has many charms".

The new couple would have a happy marriage. After the wedding, the new Lady Morpeth went to live with her husband's family at Castle Howard in Yorkshire. She was surprised to discover that the family showed little affection to the children, in contrast to her own background being raised by her loving mother. Georgiana's sister Harriet likened the relationship between the 5th Earl of Carlisle and his children to "a Prince and his followers", adding that "Lord Carlisle certainly keeps his children in great awe of him". Lord and Lady Morpeth would have six sons and six daughters together; she raised them all devotedly in contrast to the pre-existing environment of the household. The birth of their third son Edward in December 1809 delayed the marriage of her sister Harriet to Lord Granville Leveson-Gower. Georgiana was present at the birth of Harriet's first child, Susan, in 1810.

In early 1803, Georgiana and Morpeth joined her aunt Lady Bessborough in Paris. There, Bessborough and her niece were popular guests of the French nobility. The Duchess of Devonshire died later that year, on 30 March, having been ill for some time. Georgiana and other close relatives were present at her death. The Duke, aloof and away, had never been close to their three children. Once widowed, he made a greater attempt than before to become acquainted with them. However, the Duke's last unmarried daughter Harriet was unhappy with the presence of her father's long-time mistress, Lady Elizabeth Foster, in the household; Harriet frequently went to live with her elder sister. Harriet's son Frederick later wrote that the experience "strengthened the tie of sisterly affection, which bound them together during the whole of their joint lives". From 1801 onwards, Cavendish wrote to her sister almost daily until the latter's death in 1858. To their dismay, in 1809 the Duke married Foster, whom they had never liked; he died two years later.

=== Countess of Carlisle ===
In 1825, Morpeth succeeded his father as 6th Earl of Carlisle, making Georgiana the Countess of Carlisle.

Georgiana's nephew once remarked that she thought of politics and "nothing else", while her sister cared little for it. In 1838, Lady Carlisle expressed her elitist negative opinion of Charles Dickens, who was then emerging as a successful author. "I know there are such unfortunate beings as pickpockets and streetwalkers. I am very sorry for it and am very much shocked at their mode of life, but I own I do not much wish to hear what they say to one another", she said. Historian Judith Lewis cites this opinion as evidence of the prevalence of class consciousness during the 19th-century, as Lady Carlisle was "one of the more inoffensive of the grand dames of her time".

The Earl of Carlisle died in October 1848 at Castle Howard. The 6th Duke of Devonshire died in 1858; in his will, he left his sister Georgiana Chiswick House in Middlesex, a favourite residence of their parents. She died seven months later, and the house went to Georgiana's sister Harriet, Countess Granville.

== Issue ==
The Earl and Countess of Carlisle had twelve children:

- George Howard, 7th Earl of Carlisle (18 April 1802 – 5 December 1864), died unmarried
- Lady Caroline Georgiana Howard (24 June 1803 – 27 November 1881), married William Lascelles on 14 May 1823. They had nine children.
- Lady Georgiana Howard (10 May 1804 – 17 March 1860), goddaughter of the Prince of Wales; married George Agar-Ellis, 1st Baron Dover, on 7 March 1822. They had four children.
- The Hon. Frederick George Howard (8 June 1805 – 18 November 1834), killed in carriage accident aged 29
- Lady Harriet Elizabeth Georgina Howard (21 May 1806 – 27 October 1868), married George Sutherland-Leveson-Gower, 2nd Duke of Sutherland, on 28 May 1823. They had eleven children.
- William George Howard, 8th Earl of Carlisle (23 February 1808 – 29 March 1889), died unmarried
- Edward Granville George Howard, 1st Baron Lanerton (23 December 1809 – 8 October 1880), married Diana Ponsonby on 16 August 1842
- Lady Blanche Georgiana Howard (11 January 1812 – 27 April 1840), married William Cavendish, 7th Duke of Devonshire, on 6 August 1829. They had five children.
- The Hon. Charles Wentworth George Howard (27 March 1814 – 11 April 1879), married Mary Parke (daughter of James Parke, Baron Wensleydale) on 8 August 1842. They only had one son:
  - George Howard, 9th Earl of Carlisle, succeeded his uncle William as Earl of Carlisle
- Lady Elizabeth Dorothy Anne Georgiana Howard (8 December 1816 – 11 May 1891), married Rev. Francis Richard Grey (son of Charles Grey, 2nd Earl Grey) on 12 August 1840
- The Hon. Henry George Howard (22 May 1818 – 10 August 1879), married Mary McTavish (daughter of John McTavish) on 29 May 1845
- Lady Mary Matilda Georgiana Howard (28 January 1823 – 17 September 1892), married Henry Labouchere, 1st Baron Taunton, on 13 July 1852

== Ancestry ==
Ancestors of Georgiana Howard, Countess of Carlisle

16. William Cavendish, 2nd Duke of Devonshire
8. William Cavendish, 3rd Duke of Devonshire
17. Hon. Rachel Russell
4. William Cavendish, 4th Duke of Devonshire, Prime Minister of Great Britain
18. John Hoskins
9. Catherine Hoskins
19. Catherine Hale
2. William Cavendish, 5th Duke of Devonshire
20. Charles Boyle, 2nd Earl of Burlington
10. Richard Boyle, 3rd Earl of Burlington
21. Juliana Noel
5. Charlotte Boyle, 6th Baroness Clifford
22. William Savile, 2nd Marquess of Halifax
11. Lady Dorothy Savile
23. Lady Mary Finch
1. Lady Georgiana Cavendish
24. Charles Spencer, 3rd Earl of Sunderland
12. The Hon. John Spencer
25. Lady Anne Churchill
6. John Spencer, 1st Earl Spencer
26. John Carteret, 2nd Earl Granville
13. Lady Georgina Carolina Carteret
27. Frances Worsley
3. Lady Georgiana Spencer
28. William Poyntz
14. Stephen Poyntz
29. Jane Monteage
7. Margaret Georgiana Poyntz
30. Lewis Mordaunt
15. Anna Maria Mordaunt
31. Mary Collyer
