= Arthur Walsh =

Arthur Walsh may refer to:

- Arthur Walsh, 2nd Baron Ormathwaite (1827–1920)
- Arthur Walsh, 3rd Baron Ormathwaite (1859–1937), British courtier
- Arthur Walsh (U.S. senator) (1896–1947), American politician from New Jersey
- A. D. Walsh (1916–1977), British chemist
- Arthur Walsh (actor) (1923–1995), Canadian actor and dancer

== See also ==
- Arthur Welsh (disambiguation)
