= George Grant (British politician) =

British politician (1924–1984)

George Grant (11 October 1924 – 27 March 1984) was a Labour politician in the United Kingdom and Member of Parliament for Morpeth in Northumberland from 1970 until 1983.

Prior to his election to Parliament, he had served for eleven years as a member of Bedlingtonshire Council. He was also Chairman of the Ashington branch of the National Union of Mineworkers from 1963 to 1970. In the House of Commons, he served as the Parliamentary Private Secretary to the Minister of Agriculture from 1974 to 1976.

Parliament of the United Kingdom
Preceded by Will Owen	Member of Parliament for Morpeth; 1970–1983	constituency abolished
