= William Howard (1781–1843) =

English politician

The Hon. William Howard (25 December 1781 – 25 January 1843) was an English politician who was a Conservative Member of Parliament for Morpeth (1806–32) and Sutherland (1837–40).

== Early life and family ==
Howard was the second son of Frederick Howard, 5th Earl of Carlisle, and his wife, Lady Margaret Caroline Leveson-Gower, daughter of the 1st Marquess of Stafford. His eldest brother, George, succeeded their father as the 6th Earl of Carlisle in 1825; his second eldest brother, Maj. Frederick Howard, was killed in action at the Battle of Waterloo; and his third brother, the Very Rev. Henry Howard, was Dean of Lichfield. He had six sisters, including Elizabeth, Duchess of Rutland.

== Career ==
At age 24, Howard entered Parliament in 1806 as member for Morpeth, a pocket borough where his father controlled one of the two seats. He represented that borough until 1826, and again from 1830 to 1832, and was Conservative MP for the Scottish county constituency of Sutherland between 1837 and 1840.

Parliament of the United Kingdom
Preceded by William Ord; Viscount Morpeth	Member of Parliament for Morpeth; 1806–1826; With: William Ord	Succeeded by William Ord; Viscount Morpeth
Preceded by William Ord; Viscount Morpeth	Member of Parliament for Morpeth; 1830–1832; With: William Ord	Succeeded by Frederick George Howard
Preceded by Roderick Macleod	Member of Parliament for Sutherland; 1837–1840	Succeeded by David Dundas
