= Thomas Reynell (MP, died 1655) =

English politician

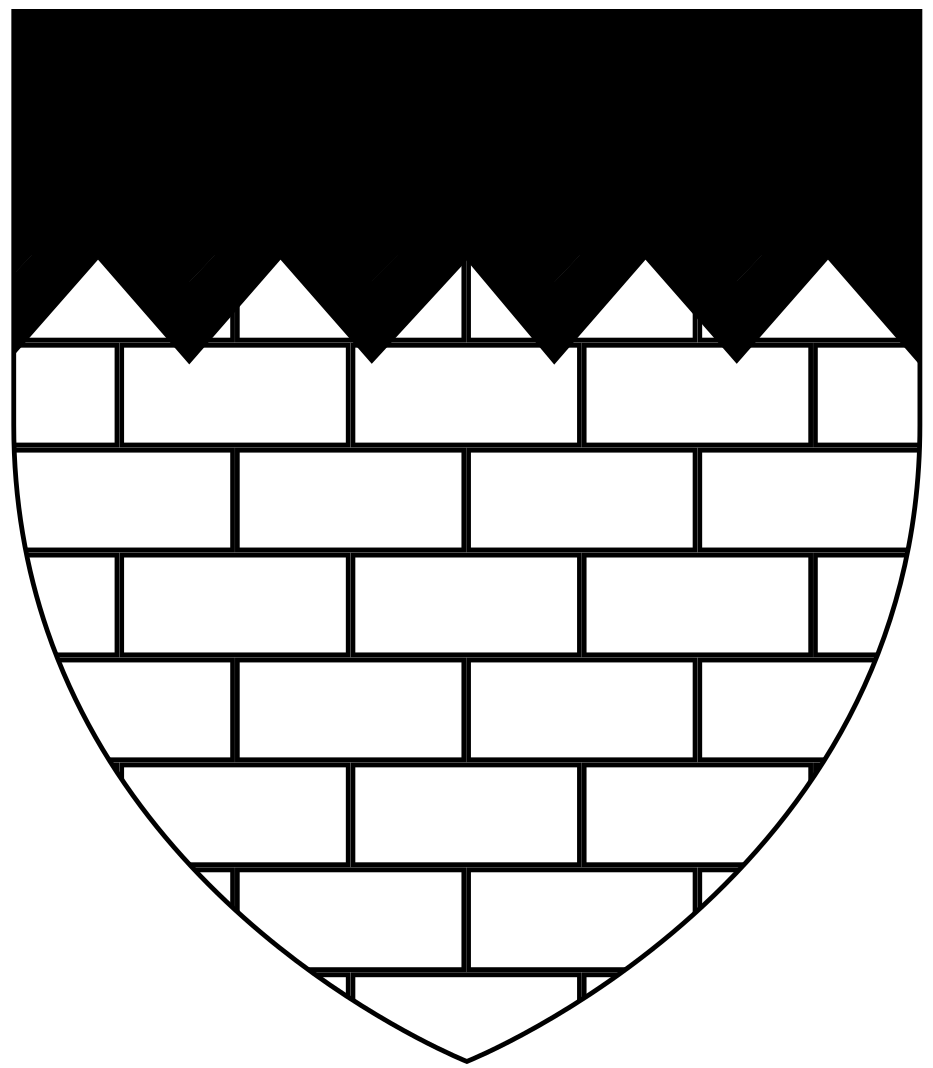
Arms of Reynell: Argent, masonry sable a chief indented of the second

Sir Thomas Reynell (1589 – May 1655) was an English politician who sat in the House of Commons from 1624 to 1629.

Reynell was the son of Sir Thomas Reynell, of West Ogwell, Devon. He matriculated at Exeter College, Oxford on 23 April 1602, aged 12. He was a student of Middle Temple in 1608. In 1624, he was elected Member of Parliament for Morpeth in the Happy Parliament. He was sewer in ordinary to King Charles I and was knighted on 15 September 1625. He was re-elected MP for Morpeth in 1625, 1626, and 1628 and sat until 1629 when King Charles decided to rule without parliament for eleven years.

Reynell died at Laleham, Middlesex, at the age of about 65.

Parliament of England
Preceded by Robert Brandling; Ralph Fetherstonhaugh	Member of Parliament for Morpeth; 1624; With: William Carnaby 1624; Sir Anthony Herbert 1625; John Bankes 1626–1629	Parliament suspended until 1640
