= Thomas Carleton (MP for Morpeth) =

English politician

Thomas Carleton (fl. 1597), of Carleton, Cumbria, was an English politician.

He was a member (MP) of the parliament of England for Morpeth in 1597. There is confusion over whether this MP was Thomas Carleton the father or Thomas Carleton the son.

Parliament of England
Preceded by Edmund Bowyer with Francis Tyndale	Member of Parliament for Morpeth; 1597; With: Robert Printis	Succeeded by
