= John Bankes =

English lawyer and politician

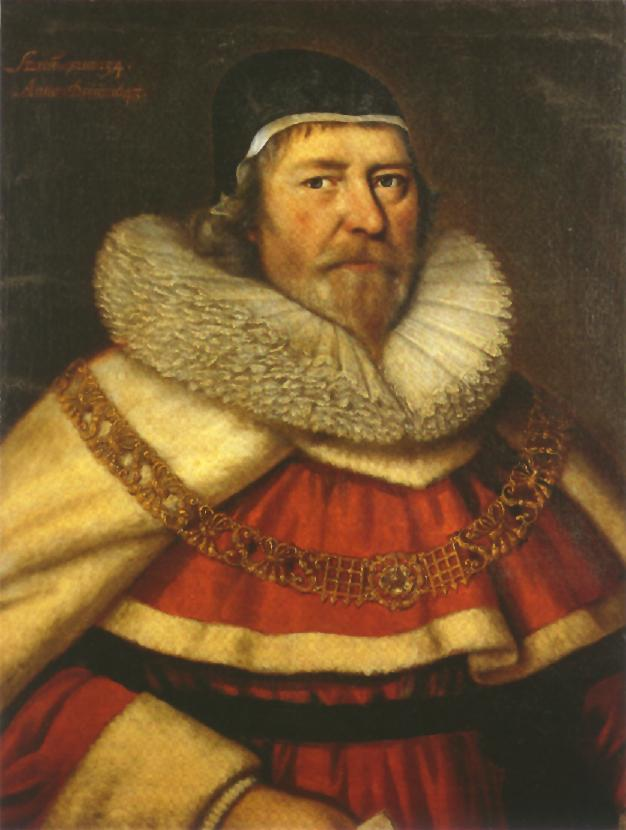
Sir John Bankes, portrait by Gilbert Jackson.

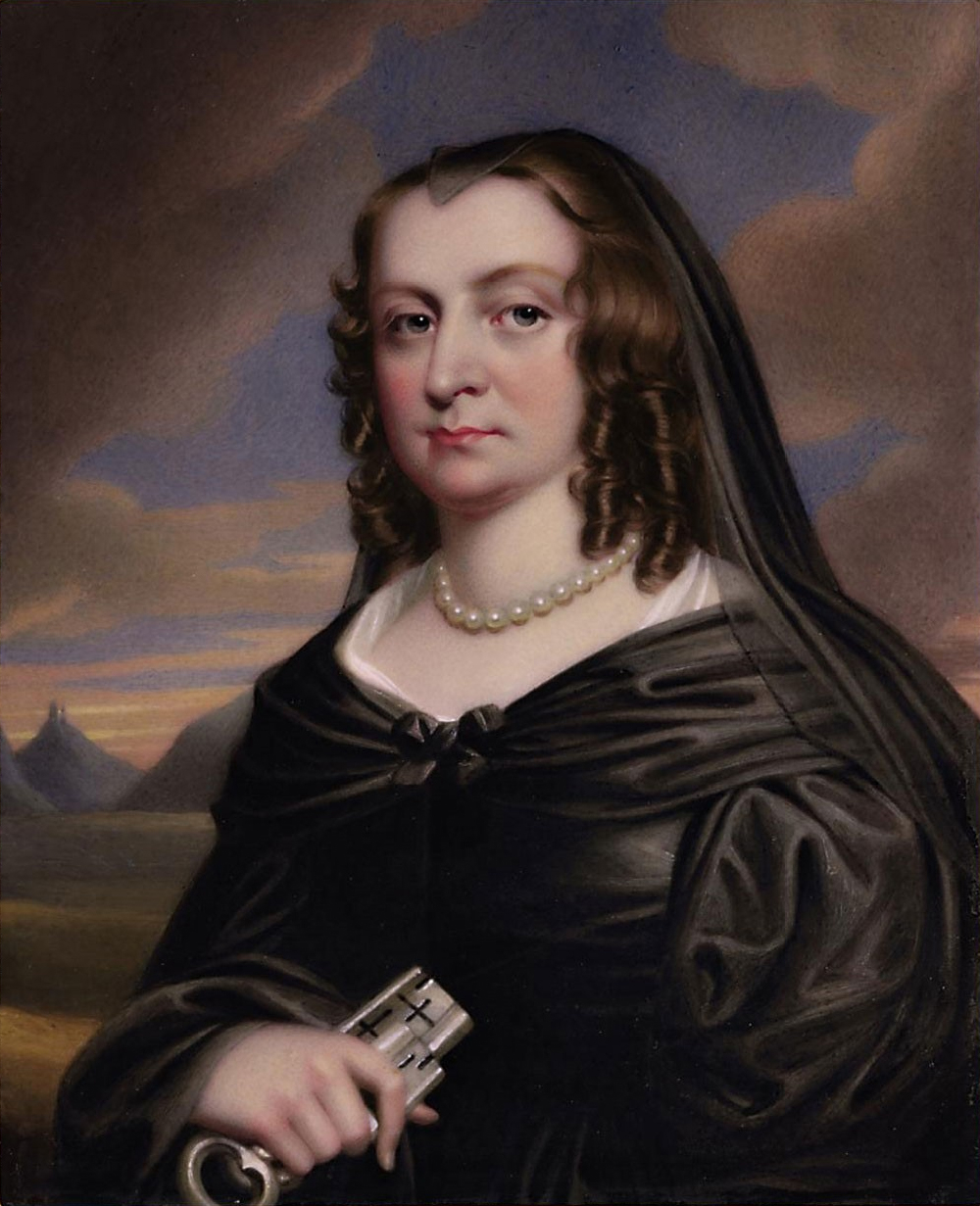
Lady Mary Bankes defended the castle during two sieges in the English Civil War.

Sir John Bankes (1589 – 28 December 1644) was an English lawyer and politician who sat in the House of Commons between 1624 and 1629. He was Attorney General and Chief Justice to Charles I during the English Civil War. Corfe Castle, his family seat was destroyed during a long siege, in which his wife Mary Hawtrey became known as Brave Dame Mary.

== Early life ==
Bankes was of the Bankes family of Keswick, Cumberland. He matriculated at Queen's College, Oxford on 22 February 1605 aged 15. He entered Gray's Inn, where he was called to the bar in 1614. In about 1618 he married Mary Hawtrey, by whom he had eleven children, four sons and seven daughters.

In 1624, he was elected Member of Parliament for Wootton Bassett. He was elected MP for Morpeth in 1626 and in 1628 and sat until 1629 when King Charles decided to rule without parliament for eleven years. He was a major participant in the legal debates surrounding the 1628 Petition of Right, especially concerning martial law for the trial and punishment of those engaged in rebellion.

In 1630, Bankes was Lent Reader of Gray's Inn and was treasurer to the Inn from 1631 to 1635. He was knighted at St James on 5 June 1631. He was also appointed attorney to Prince Charles. In September 1634 he became attorney-general to the king, holding this position during the litigation of John Hampden's famous cause of ship money; and his argument upon that question is still extant. He was also counsel for Cambridge University in 1634–35.

== Corfe Castle ==
Bankes purchased Corfe Castle with all its manors, rights, and privileges in 1635 from Lady Elizabeth Coke (née Hatton), widow of Sir Edward Coke, who had died in 1634. Bankes's ancestors had for many generations held property in and near Keswick in Cumberland. The Title deeds and grants from the Crown of the black lead mine at Borrowdale date back as far as Henry VI. and Edward IV and were again renewed under the seal of James I.

== Lord Chief Justice and death ==
In January 1640 he was made Chief Justice of the Common Pleas. Afterwards he followed the king from Westminster to York; having left his wife, Mary Bankes, to defend Corfe Castle, which she did with great courage until it was betrayed into the hands of the rebels. His name is signed to the engagement with the lords at York, in June 1642. In the same year, he was sworn of the privy council, and the degree of LL.D. conferred upon him at Oxford, where he died on 28 December 1644, aged 55, and was buried in the Cathedral of Christ Church, where there is a monument to his memory. In 1644, he was at first mentioned in the list of those persons meant to be excepted out of the general pardon; his name was afterwards struck out of that list, but he was notwithstanding impeached of high treason. His estates and property however passed to his eldest son Sir Ralph Bankes, who became an MP and built the estate of Kingston Lacy.

== Legacy ==
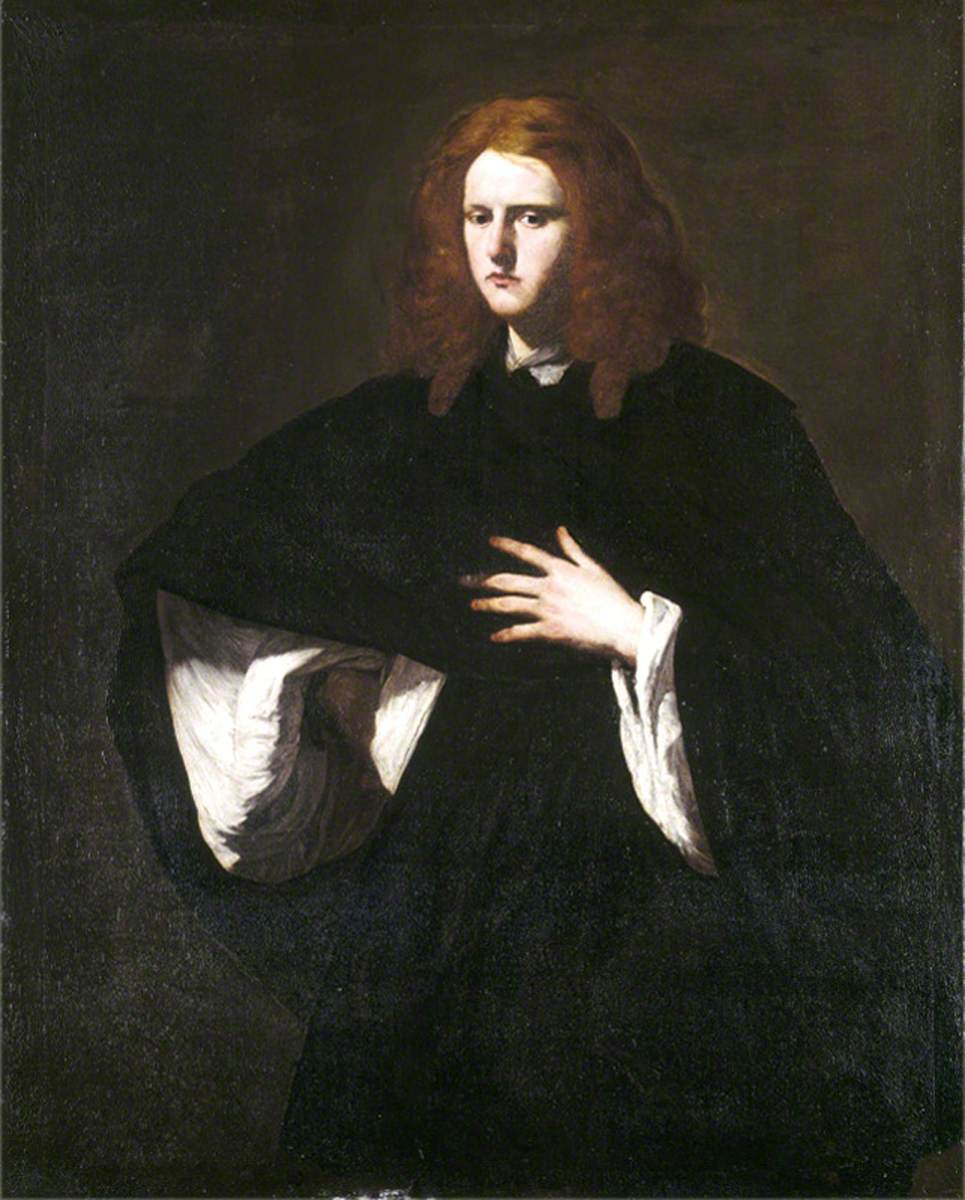
Portrait of Jerome Bankes (1635-1636–1686), the third son of Sir John Bankes.

A Wetherspoon pub in Keswick, Cumbria is named "The Chief Justice of the Common Pleas", this is due to the current building constructed in 1901 been built on land which was formally the site of a ‘workhouse’ - founded in Sir John Bankes will (dated 1642). The current building which housed the towns magistrates’ court and police station until the year 2000, was built next to the towns main post office itself constructed ten years earlier around 1890.

Parliament of England
Preceded by Richard Harrison; John Wrenham	Member of Parliament for Wootton Bassett; 1624; With: Sir Roland Egerton	Succeeded by Robert Hyde; Sir Walter Tichborne
Preceded by Sir Anthony Herbert; Sir Thomas Reynell	Member of Parliament for Morpeth; 1626–1629; With: Sir Thomas Reynell	Parliament suspended until 1640
Legal offices
Preceded by Sir Edward Littleton	Chief Justice of the Common Pleas; 1641–1644	Succeeded by Oliver St John
