= Robert Smillie =

Scottish trade unionist and Labour Party politician

- Robert Smillie in the early 1900s.

Member of Parliament for Morpeth
- In office 1923–1929
- Preceded by: John Cairns
- Succeeded by: Ebby Edwards

Robert Smillie (17 March 1857 – 16 February 1940) was a Scottish trade unionist and Labour Party politician. He was a leader of the coal miners, and played a central role in moving support from the miners away from the Liberal Party to the Labour Party. He had a firm commitment to socialism as an ideal, and militancy as a tactic.

== Early life ==
Born in Belfast, the second son of John Smillie, a Scottish crofter. Until his adult years, he spelt his name as "Smellie"; including on his marriage certificate in 1878. During his early years, he was orphaned and brought up by his grandmother who taught him how to read and write. By the age of nine, he was working as an errand boy and by the age of eleven, he was working at a spinning mill. He was able to obtain some books by authors such as Charles Dickens, Robert Burns and William Shakespeare, but his education suffered as he had to provide income for the family.

By the age of fifteen, he had left Ireland for Glasgow, where he found employment at a brass foundry, but left for the Mines of Larkhall; and later became the Leader of British mineworkers. He was first a hand-pumper at the Sumerlee Colliery, which involved working twelve hours a day with no human contact. He married Ann Hamilton on 31 December 1878, and began to educate himself in the evenings; where he worked his way up through the ranks to become the colliery checkweighman.

== Early career ==
Smillie became secretary of the Larkhall Miners' Association in 1885 after presiding over a mass meeting, which ended in its formation and when the county federation was formed, he became president in 1893. He became the President of the Scottish Miners' Federation in 1894. Employers in a number of districts demanded wage reductions, resulting in strikes. Following a special conference of the Miners Federation of Great Britain, a ballot was taken, and the strike that followed lasted from June until October 1894. Controversy arose between Smillie and Chisholm Robertson in 1900 led to a debate at Glasgow Trades Council, which Smillie won. Strikes left the Scottish miners in a greatly-weakened position, who suffered further wage cuts in 1895 and 1896. In 1897, less than 20% of the workers were organised.

A founder member of the Scottish Labour Party in 1888 and of the Independent Labour Party in 1893, Smillie was a close associate of Keir Hardie during their early careers and remained friends until Hardie's death in 1915. He campaigned for Hardie in many of his election contests, including the first in 1888. Smillie stood for parliament on seven occasions between 1894 and 1910. Later, he could have had the nomination for winnable seats in Glasgow; but chose to remain with his work for the miners.

His early commitment to socialism was moderate, and Lib-Labs were predominant in the leadership, which clashed with the miners' political views. Nevertheless, Smillie's qualities of leadership brought him to the forefront of the miners' struggles, and with the growth of militancy amongst certain sections, opinion changed to his favour.

== STUC ==
In 1899, Smillie compelled the Scottish mineowners to set up a conciliation board after much trouble, and he played an active part in setting up the Scottish Trades Union Congress, which made him such an outstanding activist. At the first STUC meeting in 1897, he came second in the ballot for president, but at the first meeting of the committee he was appointed chairman. Eight out of eleven of the delegates were supporters of the ILP.

== MFGB ==
By 1908, he resolved that the Miners' Federation of Great Britain (MFGB) should affiliate to the Labour Party. By 1910, the group was the largest in organised labour. By 1912, he was elected vice-president of the MFGB and remained in the position until 1921. All the coalfields of Great Britain went on strike in 1912, and the Triple Alliance was set up. In 1915, Smillie became president of the Triple Alliance. He fought to keep the miners outside the provisions of the Munitions Act. In 1918, he resigned from the position of president of the Scottish Miners Federation. He vigorously condemned conscription and was the president of the National Council Against Conscription when it was founded, in 1915.

Meanwhile, Smillie had been trying to gain more than political as well as industrial action. His first attempt was in 1894, when he stood at the by-election at Mid-Lanark, followed by Glasgow Camlachie in 1895 as the ILP, 1901 by-election in Lanarkshire, 1906 as a Labour Candidate for Paisley and at Mid Lanark twice in 1910. All of the attempts were failures, but he eventually was elected in 1923 as the Member of Parliament for Morpeth, but refused office in the short-lived Labour government of 1924 due to his ill health. He sponsored young female member Jennie Lee and his grandson travelled with her in the Spanish civil war and died in a Republican gaol there whilst only 19 years old.

From 1922 to 1928, Smillie again presided the Scottish Miners' Federation until he resigned due to ill health.

== Scottish National Committee ==
In 1919, Smillie served with Joe Duncan, David Kirkwood, Tom Johnston, Willie Graham, Neil MacLean, James Maxton, John MacLean and Angus MacDonald on the Scottish National Committee which sought separate Scottish representation at the Paris Peace Conference after the First World War.

== Death ==
He died at 82, followed by his wife two years later. They were survived by seven sons and two daughters.

== Notes ==
Parliament of the United Kingdom
Preceded by John Cairns	Member of Parliament for Morpeth; 1923–1929	Succeeded by Ebby Edwards
Trade union offices
Preceded by New position	President of the Scottish Miners' Federation; 1894–1918	Succeeded by John Robertson
Preceded by William Muirhead	President of the Scottish Trades Union Congress; 1903	Succeeded by George Murdoch
Preceded by Sam Woods	Vice-President of the Miners' Federation of Great Britain; 1909–1912	Succeeded by W. E. Harvey
Preceded by James Crinion and George Henry Roberts	Trades Union Congress representative to the American Federation of Labour; 1912; With: James Andrew Seddon	Succeeded by Thomas Greenall and Ivor Gwynne
Preceded by Enoch Edwards	President of the Miners' Federation of Great Britain; 1912–1922	Succeeded by Herbert Smith
Preceded by Hugh Murnin	President of the National Union of Scottish Mine Workers; 1922–1928	Succeeded by James Doonan
