= Portrait of the Duke of Devonshire (Batoni) =

Painting by Pompeo Batoni

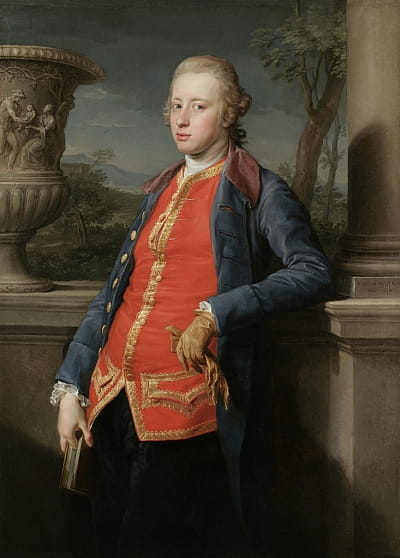
- Artist: Pompeo Batoni
- Year: 1768
- Type: Oil on canvas, portrait painting
- Dimensions: 134.6 cm × 97.9 cm (53.0 in × 38.5 in)
- Location: Chatsworth House; Derbyshire

Portrait of the Duke of Devonshire is a 1768 portrait painting by the Italian artist Pompeo Batoni. It depicts the British aristocrat and politician William Cavendish, 5th Duke of Devonshire. A wealthy landowner, whose father the fourth duke had briefly served as Prime Minister a decade earlier, he succeeded to the title in 1764. He is known for his marriage to the socialite Georgiana, Duchess of Devonshire. It was produced while the Duke was visiting Rome on a Grand Tour. Batoni specialised in producing Neoclassical portraits of British grand tourists. The painting remains in the collection of the Dukes of Devonshire at Chatsworth House.

== Bibliography ==
- Barker, Nicholas & Scarisbrick, Diana. The Devonshire Inheritance: Five Centuries of Collecting at Chatsworth. Art Services International, 2003.
- Bowron, Edgar Peters & Kerber, Peter Björn. Pompeo Batoni: Prince of Painters in Eighteenth-century Rome. Yale University Press, 2007.
- Ingamells, John. National Portrait Gallery Mid-Georgian Portraits, 1760–1790. National Portrait Gallery, 2004.
- Masters, Brian. Georgiana, Duchess of Devonshire. Hamish Hamilton, 1981.
