= John Cairns (politician) =

British politician

John Cairns (1859 – 23 May 1923) was the Labour MP for Morpeth from the 1918 general election until his death, which led to the 1923 Morpeth by-election.

Born at Choppington in Northumberland, Cairns worked as a coal miner and became active in the Northumberland Miners' Association. He was elected as the full-time financial secretary of the union, also serving as secretary of the Joint Committee in the Northumberland Coal Trade, and President of the Northumberland Aged Mine Workers' Homes Association.

In his spare time, Cairns was active in the Primitive Methodist movement, and wrote books including Money and Economics of Industry.

Cairns was a supporter of the Labour Party, for which he was elected in Morpeth in 1918. He served until his death, in 1923.

Parliament of the United Kingdom
Preceded by Thomas Burt	Member of Parliament for Morpeth; 1918–1923	Succeeded by Robert Smillie
Trade union offices
Preceded by Alfred Smalley and W. E. Harvey	Auditor of the Trades Union Congress; 1910; With: Julia Varley	Succeeded by W. E. Harvey and James E. Tattersall
