= 1833 Morpeth by-election =

UK parliamentary by-election

The 1833 Morpeth by-election was held on 31 December 1833, It was won by the Whig candidate Edward George Granville Howard unopposed, He replaced his Whig brother Frederick George Howard.
