= Henry Howard (priest) =

English Anglican clergyman

Henry Edward John Howard (14 December 1795 – 8 October 1868) was an English Anglican clergyman who was Dean of Lichfield.

== Early life and education ==
Howard was born at Castle Howard, Yorkshire, in 1795, the fourth son and youngest child of statesman Frederick Howard, 5th Earl of Carlisle, and his wife, Lady Margaret Caroline Leveson-Gower, daughter of the 1st Marquess of Stafford. His eldest brother, George, succeeded their father as the 6th Earl of Carlisle in 1825, his second eldest brother, Maj. Frederick Howard, was killed in action at the Battle of Waterloo, and his third brother, William Howard, was a Conservative MP. He had six sisters, including Elizabeth, Duchess of Rutland. He was sent to Eton College in 1805, followed by Christ Church, Oxford, earning a B.A. (1818), M.A. (1822), B.D. (1834), and D.D. (1838).

== Career ==
In 1820, he was ordained deacon and priest, and in 1822 appointed succentor of York Cathedral, with the prebendal stall of Holme attached. He became Dean of Lichfield and rector of Tatenhill, Staffordshire (a preferment worth £1,524 a year with a residence), on 27 November 1833, and in the following year he also obtained the rectory of Donington, Shropshire, worth £1,000 per annum (equivalent to £121,000 in 2023). From 1822 to 1833, he held the livings of Slingsby and Sutton-on-the-Forest, Yorkshire. He was a finished scholar and an eloquent preacher. He took a prominent part in, and contributed largely to, the restoration of Lichfield Cathedral. The establishment of the Lichfield Diocesan Training School, afterwards united to that at Saltley, as well as of the Lichfield Theological College, owed much to his efforts.

== Personal life ==
Howard married, on 13 July 1824, Henrietta Elizabeth, sixth daughter of Ichabod Wright of Mapperley Hall, Nottinghamshire, by whom he had five sons and five daughters:

- Julia Marie Howard (25 May 1825 – 27 May 1914), married 1860 Rev. James Peter King Salter
- George Howard (20 June 1826 – 7 April 1917), Librarian of the House of Commons
- Capt. John Henry Howard (30 November 1827 – 31 July 1925) of the Royal Navy
- Charlotte Henrietta Howard (3 June 1829 – 3 October 1896) married in 1853, Rev. Hon. Archibald George Campbell, son of 1st Earl Cawdor
- Emily Georgiana Howard (8 July 1830 – 12 March 1922)
- Vice-Admiral Edward Henry Howard (7 June 1832 – 18 January 1890)
- Capt. Charles John Henry Howard (28 September 1834 – 24 July 1907) of the 71st Foot
- Caroline Octavia Howard (20 March 1839 – 30 July 1922), who married Charles Philip Wilbraham, son of Randle Wilbraham of Rode Hall, Cheshire
- Elizabeth Henrietta Howard (4 November 1842 – 4 March 1915), who married Rev. Nigel Madan
- Rev. Henry Frederick Howard (9 November 1844 – 6 April 1938)

He died, after many years of physical infirmity, at Donington Rectory on 8 October 1868.

== Works ==
1. Translations from Claudian, 1823.
2. Scripture History in Familiar Lectures. The Old Testament, 1840, Vol. II of the Englishman's Library.
3. Scripture History. The New Testament, 1840, Vol. XIV of the Englishman's Library.
4. The Rape of Proserpine. The Phœnix and the Nile, by Claudian, translated 1854.
5. The Books of Genesis according to the Version of the LXX, translated, with notes, 1855.
6. The Books of Exodus and Leviticus according to the Versions of the LXX, translated with notes, 1857.
7. The Books of Numbers and Deuteronomy according to the LXX, translated, with notes, 1857.
