= Frederick Howard (British Army officer) =

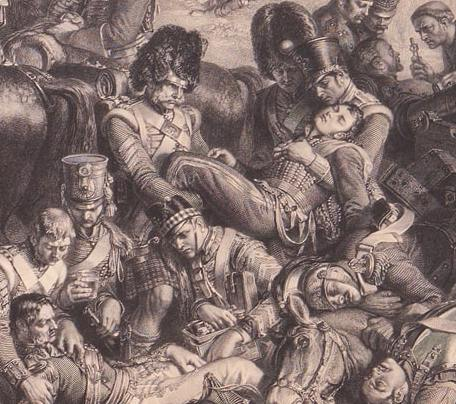
The dying Howard on the field of Waterloo; detail from a print of The Meeting of Wellington and Blücher after the Battle of Waterloo by Daniel Maclise, 1861.

Major Hon. Frederick Howard (6 December 1785 – 18 June 1815) was a British Army officer who fought in the Napoleonic Wars and was killed at the Battle of Waterloo. He is the "young, gallant Howard" mentioned in Lord Byron's poem "Childe Harold's Pilgrimage".

== Biography ==
One of 10 children, Howard was the third of four sons of Frederick Howard, 5th Earl of Carlisle, and Lady Margaret Caroline Leveson-Gower, daughter of the 1st Marquess of Stafford. His eldest brother, George, succeeded their father as the 6th Earl of Carlisle in 1825, his elder brother William Howard was a Conservative MP, and his youngest brother, the Very. Rev. Henry Howard, was Dean of Lichfield. He had six sisters, including Elizabeth, Duchess of Rutland.

Howard, who commanded a squadron of the 10th Hussars in Vivian's Brigade, was killed leading a charge at the very end of the Battle of Waterloo. It is likely he was the last Anglo-Allied officer to be killed. He was buried at Waterloo, but on 3 August 1815 his body was disinterred and re-interred in Streatham. In 1879, his remains were moved again and re-interred in the family mausoleum at Castle Howard, Yorkshire.

== Family ==
On 6 August 1811, Howard married Frances Susan Lambton, the only daughter of MP William Henry Lambton, of Lambton Hall, Durham, and sister of the 1st Earl of Durham. They had one son before his death, Frederick John Howard (1814–1897), and a second son, Villiers Frederick Francis Howard (16 November 1815 – 30 November 1823), who was born after his father's death but died in childhood.

After his death, his widow remarried Henry Frederick Compton Cavendish in 1819, and had a further six children.
