= Morpeth (constituency) =

Parliamentary constituency in the United Kingdom, 1832–1983

- Former borough constituency for the House of Commons

1553–1983
- Seats: 1553–1832: two 1832–1983: one
- Replaced by: Wansbeck and Berwick-upon-Tweed

Morpeth was a constituency centred on the town of Morpeth in Northumberland represented in the House of Commons of the Parliament of England from 1553 to 1707, the Parliament of Great Britain from 1707 to 1800, and then the Parliament of the United Kingdom from 1800 to 1983.

The Parliamentary Borough of Morpeth first sent Members (MPs) to Parliament in 1553. It elected two MPs under the bloc vote system until the 1832 general election, when the Great Reform Act reduced its representation to one MP, elected under the first past the post system. The seat was redesignated as a county constituency for the 1950 general election and abolished for the 1983 general election.

== Boundaries ==
=== 1832–1868 ===
The parliamentary borough, as defined by the Parliamentary Boundaries Act 1832, comprised the township of Morpeth and several surrounding townships, as well as the parish of Bedlington.

=== 1868–1918 ===
Under the Boundary Act 1868, the borough was expanded to include the townships of Cowpen and Newsham, which incorporated the town of Blyth.

No changes were made by the Redistribution of Seats Act 1885.

=== 1918–1950 ===
- the Municipal Borough of Morpeth
- the Urban Districts of Ashington, Bedlingtonshire, and Blyth
- part of the Rural District of Morpeth

The boundaries were largely unchanged, except for the addition of Ashington.

=== 1950–1983 ===
- the Municipal Borough of Morpeth
- the Urban Districts of Ashington and Newbiggin-by-the-Sea
- the Rural District of Morpeth.

Blyth and Bedlington formed the basis of the new constituency of Blyth. Newbiggin-by-the-Sea and the remainder (bulk) of the Rural District of Morpeth was transferred from Wansbeck, which was now abolished.

=== Abolition ===
On abolition in 1983, 6 rural wards to the north of Morpeth were transferred to Berwick-upon-Tweed. The remainder of the seat formed the basis of the re-established constituency of Wansbeck.

== Members of Parliament ==
=== 1553–1640 ===
Parliament	First member	Second member
1553 (Oct)	John Watson	William Ward
1554 (Apr)	Thomas Bates	William Ward
1554 (Nov)	Sir Henry Percy	William Ward
1555	?Cuthbert Horsley	?Thomas Bates
1558	Robert Wheatley	Thomas Bates
1558–9	William Ward	Nicholas Purslow
1562 (Dec)	William Ward	Arthur Welshe
1571	Francis Gawdy	Nicholas Mynn
1572 (Apr)	Sir George Bowes died and replaced Dec 1580 by Richard Drake	Richard Wroth
1584	William Carey	George Gifford
1586	Robert Carey, 1st Earl of Monmouth	Anthony Felton
1588–9	Robert Carey, 1st Earl of Monmouth	Henry Noel
1593	Robert Carey, 1st Earl of Monmouth, sat for Callington, replaced by Edmund Bowyer	Francis Tyndale
1597 (Sep)	Robert Printis	Thomas Carleton
1601 (Oct)	George Savile	John Browne
1604–1611	Sir Christopher Perkins	John Hare
1614	William Button	Arnold Herbert
1621–1622	Robert Brandling	John Robson; Robson declared ineligible, being a priest replaced by Ralph Fetherstonhaugh
1624	Sir Thomas Reynell	Sir William Carnaby
1625	Sir Thomas Reynell	Sir Anthony Herbert
1626	Sir Thomas Reynell	John Bankes
1628	Sir Thomas Reynell	John Bankes
1629–1640	No Parliaments convened	

=== 1640–1832 ===
Year	First member	First party	Second member	Second party
November 1640	Sir William Carnaby	Royalist	John Fenwick	Royalist
August 1642	Carnaby disabled from sitting – seat vacant		John Fenwick	Royalist
January 1643	Carnaby disabled from sitting – seat vacant		Fenwick disabled from sitting – seat vacant	
1645	Hon. John Fiennes		George Fenwick	
December 1648	Fiennes excluded in Pride's Purge – seat vacant		George Fenwick	
1653	Morpeth was unrepresented in the Barebones Parliament and the First and Second Parliaments of the Protectorate			
January 1659	Robert Delaval		Robert Mitford	
May 1659	Morpeth was unrepresented in the restored Rump			
April 1660	Thomas Widdrington jnr (died May 1660)		Ralph Knight	
June 1660	Sir George Downing		Ralph Knight	
1661	Sir George Downing		Henry Widdrington	
1666	Sir George Downing		Edward Howard	
1679	Sir George Downing		Daniel Collingwood	
1685	Sir Henry Pickering		Theophilus Oglethorpe	
1689	Charles Howard	Whig	Roger Fenwick	
1692	George Nicholas		Roger Fenwick	
1695	George Nicholas		Sir Henry Belasyse	
1698	Philip Howard	Whig	Sir Henry Belasyse	
January 1701	William Howard	Whig	Sir Henry Belasyse	
May 1701	Sir Richard Sandford		Sir Henry Belasyse	
December 1701	Emanuel Howe	Whig	Sir John Delaval	Whig
1705	Sir Richard Sandford		Edmund Maine	
1708	Sir Richard Sandford		Sir John Bennett	
1710	Sir Richard Sandford		Christopher Wandesford	Whig
1713	Sir John Germain		Oley Douglas	
1715	Viscount Morpeth		The Viscount Castlecomer	Whig
1717	Viscount Morpeth		Hon. George Carpenter	
1727	Viscount Morpeth		Thomas Robinson	
1734	Viscount Morpeth		Sir Henry Liddell	
1738	Henry Furnese		Sir Henry Liddell	
1741	Robert Ord		Sir Henry Liddell	
1747	Robert Ord		Viscount Limerick	
1754	Robert Ord		Thomas Duncombe	Tory
1755	Sir Matthew Fetherstonhaugh		Thomas Duncombe	Tory
1761	Viscount Garlies		Thomas Duncombe	Whig
1768	Peter Beckford		Sir Matthew White Ridley	
1774	Francis Eyre		Peter Delmé	
1775	Hon. William Byron		Peter Delmé	
1776	Gilbert Elliot		Peter Delmé	
1777	John Egerton	Tory	Peter Delmé	
1780	Anthony Morris Storer		Peter Delmé	
1784	Major Sir James Erskine	Whig	Peter Delmé	
1790	Major Sir James Erskine	Whig	Francis Gregg	
1795	Major Sir James Erskine	Whig	Viscount Morpeth	Whig
1796	William Huskisson	Tory	Viscount Morpeth	Whig
1802	William Ord	Whig	Viscount Morpeth	Whig
1806	William Ord	Whig	Hon. William Howard	Whig
1826	William Ord	Whig	Viscount Morpeth	Whig
1830	William Ord	Whig	Hon. William Howard	Whig
1832	representation reduced to one member			

=== 1832–1983 ===
Year	Member	Party
1832	Frederick George Howard	Whig
1834	Edward Howard	Whig
1837	Granville Leveson-Gower	Whig
1840	Edward Howard	Whig
1853	Sir George Grey	Whig
1874	Thomas Burt	Lib-Lab
1918	John Cairns	Labour
1923	Robert Smillie	Labour
1929	Ebby Edwards	Labour
1931	Godfrey Nicholson	Conservative
1935	Robert Taylor	Labour
1954	Will Owen	Labour
1970	George Grant	Labour
1983	constituency abolished	

== Election results ==
=== Elections in the 1830s ===
General election 1830: Morpeth
Party	Candidate	Votes	%	±%
Whig	William Ord	Unopposed		
Whig	William Howard	Unopposed		
Registered electors		c. 233		
Whig hold				
Whig hold				

General election 1831: Morpeth
Party	Candidate	Votes	%	±%
Whig	William Ord	Unopposed		
Whig	William Howard	Unopposed		
Registered electors		c. 233		
Whig hold				
Whig hold				

General election 1832: Morpeth
Party	Candidate	Votes	%	±%
Whig	Frederick George Howard	Unopposed		
Registered electors		321		
Whig hold				

Howard's death caused a by-election.

By-election, 31 December 1833: Morpeth
Party	Candidate	Votes	%	±%
Whig	Edward Howard	Unopposed		
Whig hold				

General election 1835: Morpeth
Party	Candidate	Votes	%	±%
Whig	Edward Howard	Unopposed		
Registered electors		336		
Whig hold				

Howard resigned, causing a by-election.

By-election, 8 February 1837: Morpeth
Party	Candidate	Votes	%	±%
Whig	Granville Leveson-Gower	Unopposed		
Whig hold				

General election 1837: Morpeth
Party	Candidate	Votes	%	±%
Whig	Granville Leveson-Gower	Unopposed		
Registered electors		360		
Whig hold				

=== Elections in the 1840s ===
Leveson-Gower resigned by accepting the office of Steward of the Chiltern Hundreds, causing a by-election.

By-election, 22 February 1840: Morpeth
Party	Candidate	Votes	%	±%
Whig	Edward Howard	Unopposed		
Whig hold				

General election 1841: Morpeth
Party	Candidate	Votes	%	±%
Whig	Edward Howard	Unopposed		
Registered electors		392		
Whig hold				

General election 1847: Morpeth
Party	Candidate	Votes	%	±%
Whig	Edward Howard	Unopposed		
Registered electors		440		
Whig hold				

=== Elections in the 1850s ===
General election 1852: Morpeth
Party	Candidate	Votes	%	±%
Whig	Edward Howard	Unopposed		
Registered electors		415		
Whig hold				

Howard resigned, causing a by-election.

By-election, 1 January 1853: Morpeth
Party	Candidate	Votes	%	±%
Whig	George Grey	Unopposed		
Whig hold				

Grey was appointed Secretary of State for the Colonies, requiring a by-election.

By-election, 17 June 1854: Morpeth
Party	Candidate	Votes	%	±%
Whig	George Grey	Unopposed		
Whig hold				

General election 1857: Morpeth
Party	Candidate	Votes	%	±%
Whig	George Grey	Unopposed		
Registered electors		391		
Whig hold				

General election 1859: Morpeth
Party	Candidate	Votes	%	±%
Liberal	George Grey	Unopposed		
Registered electors		408		
Liberal hold				

Grey was appointed Chancellor of the Duchy of Lancaster, requiring a by-election.

By-election, 27 June 1859: Morpeth
Party	Candidate	Votes	%	±%
Liberal	George Grey	Unopposed		
Liberal hold				

=== Elections in the 1860s ===
Grey was appointed Home Secretary, requiring a by-election.

By-election, 31 July 1861: Morpeth
Party	Candidate	Votes	%	±%
Liberal	George Grey	Unopposed		
Liberal hold				

General election 1865: Morpeth
Party	Candidate	Votes	%	±%
Liberal	George Grey	Unopposed		
Registered electors		448		
Liberal hold				

General election 1868: Morpeth
Party	Candidate	Votes	%	±%
Liberal	George Grey	Unopposed		
Registered electors		2,006		
Liberal hold				

=== Elections in the 1870s ===
General election 1874: Morpeth
Party	Candidate	Votes	%	±%
Lib-Lab	Thomas Burt	3,332	85.1	N/A
Conservative	Francis Duncan	585	14.9	New
Majority		2,747	70.1	N/A
Turnout		3,917	79.7	N/A
Registered electors		4,912		
Lib-Lab hold				

=== Elections in the 1880s ===
General election 1880: Morpeth
Party	Candidate	Votes	%	±%
Lib-Lab	Thomas Burt	Unopposed		
Lib-Lab hold				

General election 1885: Morpeth
Party	Candidate	Votes	%	±%
Lib-Lab	Thomas Burt	Unopposed		
Lib-Lab hold				

General election 1886: Morpeth
Party	Candidate	Votes	%	±%
Lib-Lab	Thomas Burt	Unopposed		
Lib-Lab hold				

=== Elections in the 1890s ===
General election 1892: Morpeth
Party	Candidate	Votes	%	±%
Lib-Lab	Thomas Burt	Unopposed		
Lib-Lab hold				

Thomas Burt

General election 1895: Morpeth
Party	Candidate	Votes	%	±%
Lib-Lab	Thomas Burt	3,404	73.4	N/A
Conservative	Maltman Barry	1,235	26.6	New
Majority		2,169	46.8	N/A
Turnout		4,639	60.8	N/A
Registered electors		7,627		
Lib-Lab hold		Swing	N/A	

=== Elections in the 1900s ===
General election 1900: Morpeth
Party	Candidate	Votes	%	±%
Lib-Lab	Thomas Burt	3,117	53.5	−19.9
Conservative	Maltman Barry	2,707	46.5	+19.9
Majority		410	7.0	−39.8
Turnout		5,824	68.6	+7.8
Registered electors		8,490		
Lib-Lab hold		Swing	-19.9	

General election 1906: Morpeth
Party	Candidate	Votes	%	±%
Lib-Lab	Thomas Burt	5,518	74.2	+20.7
Liberal Unionist	Stuart Coats	1,919	25.8	−20.7
Majority		3,599	48.4	+41.4
Turnout		7,437	78.9	+10.3
Registered electors		9,425		
Lib-Lab hold		Swing	+20.7	

=== Elections in the 1910s ===
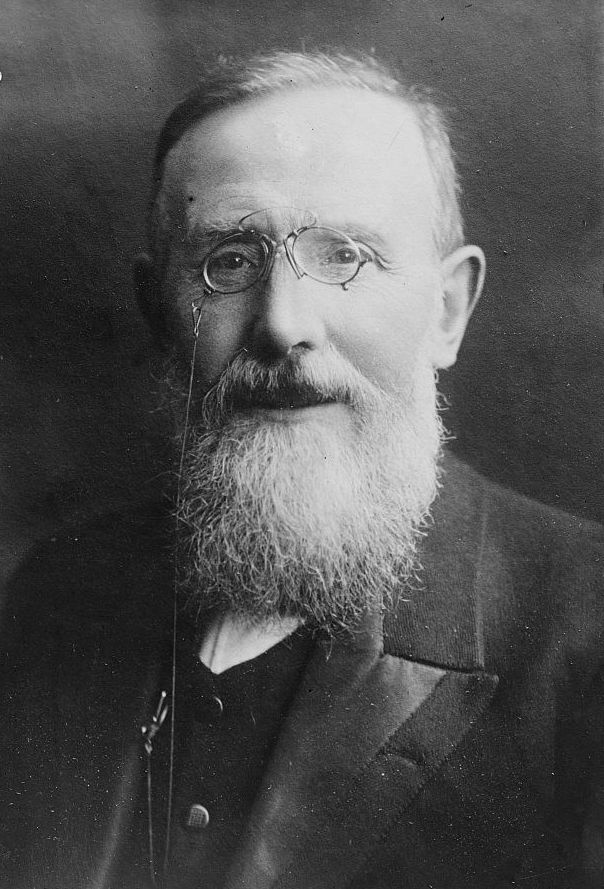
Thomas Burt

General election January 1910: Morpeth
Party	Candidate	Votes	%	±%
Lib-Lab	Thomas Burt	5,874	66.1	−8.1
Conservative	Jasper Ridley	3,009	33.9	+8.1
Majority		2,865	32.2	−16.2
Turnout		8,883	88.7	+9.8
Registered electors		10,010		
Lib-Lab hold		Swing	−8.1	

General election December 1910: Morpeth
Party	Candidate	Votes	%	±%
Lib-Lab	Thomas Burt	Unopposed		
Lib-Lab hold				

General election 1918: Morpeth
Party	Candidate	Votes	%	±%
Labour	John Cairns	7,677	34.3	N/A
Liberal	Frank Thornborough	7,140	31.9	N/A
Unionist	Claud Henry Meares	4,320	19.3	New
Independent	*Gerald Douglas Newton	2,729	12.2	New
National Democratic	Thomas Moffatt Allison	511	2.3	New
Majority		537	2.4	N/A
Turnout		22,377	56.3	N/A
Registered electors		39,773		
Labour gain from Liberal		Swing	N/A	

* Newton received support from the local branch of the National Federation of Discharged and Demobilized Sailors and Soldiers

=== Elections in the 1920s ===
General election 1922: Morpeth
Party	Candidate	Votes	%	±%
Labour	John Cairns	15,026	48.3	+14.0
Liberal	Frank Thornborough	10,007	32.2	+0.3
Unionist	Charles Septimus Shortt	6,045	19.5	+0.2
Majority		5,019	16.1	+13.7
Turnout		31,078	72.1	+15.8
Registered electors		43,098		
Labour hold		Swing	+6.9	

1923 Morpeth by-election
Party	Candidate	Votes	%	±%
Labour	Robert Smillie	20,053	60.5	+12.2
Liberal	Frank Thornborough	13,087	39.5	+7.3
Majority		6,966	21.0	+4.9
Turnout		33,140	76.9	+4.8
Registered electors		43,098		
Labour hold		Swing	+2.5	

General election 1923: Morpeth
Party	Candidate	Votes	%	±%
Labour	Robert Smillie	16,902	64.2	+15.9
Liberal	John Dodd	9,411	35.8	+3.6
Majority		7,491	28.4	+12.3
Turnout		26,313	59.4	−12.7
Registered electors		44,323		
Labour hold		Swing	+6.2	

General election 1924: Morpeth
Party	Candidate	Votes	%	±%
Labour	Robert Smillie	19,248	56.8	−7.4
Unionist	Irene Ward	10,828	32.0	New
Liberal	John Dodd	3,805	11.2	−24.6
Majority		8,420	24.8	−3.6
Turnout		33,881	75.0	+15.6
Registered electors		45,150		
Labour hold		Swing	+8.6	

General election 1929: Morpeth
Party	Candidate	Votes	%	±%
Labour	Ebby Edwards	25,508	61.3	+4.5
Unionist	Irene Ward	9,206	22.1	−9.9
Liberal	John Ritson	6,888	16.6	+5.4
Majority		16,302	39.2	+14.4
Turnout		41,602	75.5	+0.5
Registered electors		55,126		
Labour hold		Swing	+7.2	

=== Elections in the 1930s ===
General election 1931: Morpeth
Party	Candidate	Votes	%	±%
Conservative	Godfrey Nicholson	20,806	51.35	
Labour	Ebby Edwards	19,714	48.65	
Majority		1,092	2.70	N/A
Turnout		39,520	70.28	
Conservative gain from Labour		Swing		

General election 1935: Morpeth
Party	Candidate	Votes	%	±%
Labour	Robert Taylor	28,900	59.17	
Conservative	Godfrey Nicholson	19,944	40.83	
Majority		8,956	18.34	N/A
Turnout		48,844	78.68	
Labour gain from Conservative		Swing		

=== Elections in the 1940s ===
General election 1945: Morpeth
Party	Candidate	Votes	%	±%
Labour	Robert Taylor	38,521	73.23	
Conservative	Gilbert Longden	14,079	26.77	
Majority		24,442	46.46	
Turnout		52,600	79.50	
Labour hold		Swing		

=== Elections in the 1950s ===
General election 1950: Morpeth
Party	Candidate	Votes	%	±%
Labour	Robert Taylor	27,548	71.51	
Conservative	T. Turnbull	10,973	28.49	
Majority		16,575	43.02	
Turnout		38,521	86.55	
Labour hold		Swing		

General election 1951: Morpeth
Party	Candidate	Votes	%	±%
Labour	Robert Taylor	27,718	71.88	
Conservative	Peter Molison Colvin-Smith	10,843	28.12	
Majority		16,875	43.76	
Turnout		38,561	85.47	
Labour hold		Swing		

1954 Morpeth by-election
Party	Candidate	Votes	%	±%
Labour Co-op	Will Owen	23,491	71.27	−0.61
Conservative	William Elliott	9,469	28.73	+0.61
Majority		14,022	42.54	−1.22
Turnout		32,960		
Labour Co-op hold		Swing		

General election 1955: Morpeth
Party	Candidate	Votes	%	±%
Labour Co-op	Will Owen	25,452	70.56	
Conservative	William Elliott	10,619	29.44	
Majority		14,833	41.12	
Turnout		36,071	80.40	
Labour Co-op hold		Swing		

General election 1959: Morpeth
Party	Candidate	Votes	%	±%
Labour Co-op	Will Owen	27,435	71.91	
Conservative	Derek Bloom	10,716	28.09	
Majority		16,719	43.82	
Turnout		38,151	84.11	
Labour Co-op hold		Swing		

=== Elections in the 1960s ===
General election 1964: Morpeth
Party	Candidate	Votes	%	±%
Labour Co-op	Will Owen	26,114	72.70	
Conservative	Derek Bloom	9,805	27.30	
Majority		16,309	45.40	
Turnout		35,919	80.81	
Labour Co-op hold		Swing		

General election 1966: Morpeth
Party	Candidate	Votes	%	±%
Labour Co-op	Will Owen	25,223	74.36	
Conservative	Nigel Porter	8,698	25.64	
Majority		16,525	48.72	
Turnout		33,921	76.93	
Labour Co-op hold		Swing		

=== Elections in the 1970s ===
General election 1970: Morpeth
Party	Candidate	Votes	%	±%
Labour	George Grant	21,826	60.35	
Conservative	K. Ian Tunnicliffe	9,515	26.31	
Liberal	Raymond McClure	4,825	13.34	New
Majority		12,311	34.04	
Turnout		36,166	75.98	
Labour hold		Swing		

General election February 1974: Morpeth
Party	Candidate	Votes	%	±%
Labour	George Grant	22,026	56.40	
Conservative	David Curry	8,992	23.03	
Liberal	Humphrey Devereux	8,035	20.57	
Majority		13,034	33.37	
Turnout		39,053	81.18	
Labour hold		Swing		

General election October 1974: Morpeth
Party	Candidate	Votes	%	±%
Labour	George Grant	22,696	63.80	
Conservative	David Curry	8,009	22.52	
Liberal	Barrie Rogers	4,866	13.68	
Majority		14,687	41.28	
Turnout		35,571	73.32	
Labour hold		Swing		

General election 1979: Morpeth
Party	Candidate	Votes	%	±%
Labour	George Grant	21,744	56.29	
Conservative	Stephen Edwards	9,913	25.66	
Liberal	Alan Thompson	6,972	18.05	
Majority		11,831	30.63	
Turnout		38,629	77.44	
Labour hold		Swing		

== See also ==
- History of parliamentary constituencies and boundaries in Northumberland
- 1923 Morpeth by-election
