= William George Howard, 8th Earl of Carlisle =

English Earl

The Right Honourable Rev. The Earl of Carlisle

Rector of Londesborough
- In office 1836–1889
- Preceded by: Sydney Smith
- Succeeded by: Richard Wilton

Personal details
- Born: William George Howard; 23 February 1808
- Died: 29 March 1889 (aged 81)
- Relations: George Howard, 7th Earl of Carlisle (brother)
- Parent(s): George Howard, 6th Earl of Carlisle; Georgiana Howard, Countess of Carlisle
- Education: Eton College
- Alma mater: Christ Church, Oxford

Rev. William George Howard, 8th Earl of Carlisle (23 February 1808 – 29 March 1889) was an English peer and Anglican clergyman from the Howard family.

== Early life ==
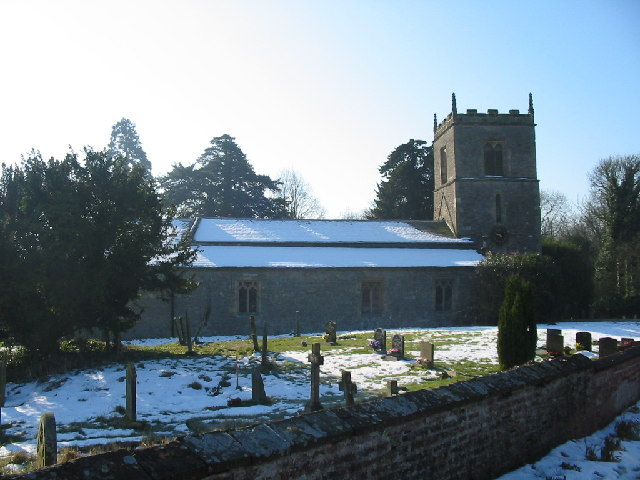
All Saints' Church, Londesborough

Carlisle was born in London, the third son of George Howard, 6th Earl of Carlisle and Lady Georgiana Cavendish. His mother was the daughter of William Cavendish, 5th Duke of Devonshire and Lady Georgiana Spencer (the eldest daughter of John Spencer, 1st Earl Spencer).

Howard was educated at Eton College and Christ Church, Oxford.

== Career ==
Carlisle was Rector of Londesborough (a living in the gift of the Earl of Londesborough) in the East Riding of Yorkshire from 1832 for more than forty years until 1877, although from 1866, due to Lord Howard's mental incapacity, his duties were performed by his replacement.

He succeeded to the title on 5 December 1864 on the death of his elder brother George Howard, 7th Earl of Carlisle, who never married. On his death, the title passed to his nephew George Howard, 9th Earl of Carlisle.

Religious titles
Preceded by Sydney Smith	Rector of Londesborough; 1836–1889	Succeeded by Richard Wilton
Peerage of England
Preceded by George Howard	Earl of Carlisle; 1864–1889	Succeeded by George Howard
