= William Ord (1781–1855) =

English Whig politician and landowner

William Ord (2 January 1781 – 28 July 1855) was an English Whig politician and landowner, the son of William Ord and Eleanor Brandling.

He inherited estates and coal and lead mining interests at Whitfield, Northumberland on the death of his father. His residence was Whitfield Hall. After his father's death, his mother remarried Thomas Creevey in 1803.

Ord was granted the Freedom of Newcastle-on-Tyne in 1808. He was Member of Parliament for Morpeth 1802–32, when one of the seats was eliminated for that constituency. He was defeated that year when standing for South Northumberland, but was returned for Newcastle-upon-Tyne 1835–52. Politically, Ord was a left-wing Whig, a follower of Samuel Whitbread.

He married Mary Scott, daughter of the Rector of St Lawrence, Southampton, Hampshire and sister of Jane Harley, Countess of Oxford.

Their only son, also named William Henry (1803–1838), was a barrister and Member of Parliament for Newport, Isle of Wight, married Frances Vere Lorraine in 1829 but died aged only 36 in 1838. In 1855 his father left his estates to his son's widow Frances (who remarried Sir Edward Blackett, 6th Baronet in 1851) and to his niece, Anne Jane Hamilton, who married Rev John Alexander Blackett, Rector of Wolsingham, the youngest son of Christopher Blackett of Wylam, on condition that he changed his name to Blackett-Ord.

Parliament of the United Kingdom
Preceded by Viscount Howard of Morpeth; William Huskisson	Member of Parliament for Morpeth; 1802–1832; With: Viscount Howard of Morpeth 1802–1806, 1826–1830; William Howard 1806–1826, 1830–1832	Succeeded by Frederick George Howard
Preceded by Sir Matthew White Ridley, Bt; John Hodgson Hinde	Member of Parliament for Newcastle-upon-Tyne; 1835–1852; With: Sir Matthew White Ridley, Bt 1835–1836; John Hodgson Hinde 1836–1847; Thomas Emerson Headlam 1847–1852	Succeeded by Thomas Emerson Headlam; John Blackett
