= Nicholas Purslow =

16th-century English politician

Nicholas Purslow (by 1533 – 8 August 1563), of the Inner Temple, London, was an English politician.

== Career ==
He was a member (MP) of the parliament of England for Appleby in 1558 and for Morpeth in 1559.

== Death ==
He made his will on 5 July 1563, and died on 8 August. He was survived by his wife, Margaret, née Williams.
