= William Ward (MP for Morpeth) =

English politician

William Ward (fl. 1553–1563) was an English politician.

== Family ==
Nothing is known of Ward's years of birth and death, or of his family. There is no record of him after 1563. He is thought to be a different man from William Ward (MP for Lancaster), MP for Lancaster in 1547.

== Career ==
He was a member (MP) of the Parliament of England for Morpeth in October 1553, April 1554, November 1554, 1559 and 1563, and for Carlisle in 1555.
