= Thomas Bates (MP) =

16th-century English politician

Thomas Bates (c. 1526–1587), of Morpeth and Holywell, Northumberland, was an English politician.

== Family ==
His heirs were his brother, Robert, and Robert's sons. Married to Isabelle.

== Career ==
He was a member (MP) of the parliament of England for Morpeth April 1554, ?1555 and 1558.
