= Blanche Cavendish, Countess of Burlington =

British noblewoman (1812–1840)

The Right Honourable The Countess of Burlington
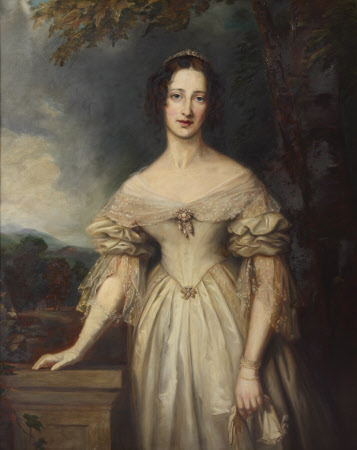
- Portrait by John Lucas

Personal details
- Born: Hon. Blanche Georgiana Howard; 11 January 1812
- Died: 27 April 1840 (aged 28) Westhill Park near Wantage, Oxfordshire, England
- Resting place: St Peter's Church, Edensor
- Spouse: William Cavendish, 2nd Earl of Burlington (m. 1829)
- Children: William Cavendish, Lord Cavendish; Spencer Cavendish, 8th Duke of Devonshire; Lady Louisa Egerton; Lord Frederick Cavendish; Lord Edward Cavendish
- Parents: George Howard, 6th Earl of Carlisle (father); Lady Georgiana Cavendish (mother)

Blanche Cavendish, Countess of Burlington (née Howard; 11 January 1812 – 27 April 1840), was the wife of William Cavendish, 2nd Earl of Burlington, who would later become the 7th Duke of Devonshire.

== Early life and family ==
Born on 11 January 1812, she was the eighth child of George Howard, 6th Earl of Carlisle, and his wife Georgiana, sister of the 6th Duke of Devonshire. The latter, known as the "Bachelor Duke", favoured Blanche and it has been suggested that his decision not to marry and have children of his own may have been coloured by his affection for her and her husband.

In February 1816, Blanche's maternal aunt Harriet described the young girl in a letter to her sister, writing that Blanche is "too great a darling; she is shy in general, and I suppose it is from some likeness in voice and manner that she forgets with me that I am not you, calls me Mama, and is full of jokes and animation. How pretty she is!"

== Marriage and issue ==
Blanche's unmarried maternal uncle, the Duke of Devonshire, favoured a marriage between his heir, William Cavendish, and his niece. The Duke felt Blanche had humility and lacked self-consciousness, while William was intelligent but overly serious. Before the couple were even introduced, the Duke made preparations; he held a ball for Blanche, then seventeen years old and, weeks later, William proposed to her and was quickly accepted.

Blanche married William Cavendish on 6 August 1829, a few years prior to his inheriting the earldom of Burlington from his grandfather, George Cavendish, 1st Earl of Burlington. It would prove to be a happy marriage, as the pair shared the same political views and deeply religious values. The couple had five children, one of whom died in infancy:

- William Cavendish, Lord Cavendish (8 October 1831 – 15 May 1834)
- Spencer Compton Cavendish, 8th Duke of Devonshire (23 July 1833 – 24 March 1908)
- Lady Louisa Caroline Cavendish (1835 – 21 Sep 1907), who married the Hon. Francis Egerton
- Rt. Hon. Lord Frederick Charles Cavendish (30 November 1836 – 6 May 1882)
- Lord Edward Cavendish (28 January 1838 – 18 May 1891)

From 1838 until her death, the countess was a Lady of the Bedchamber to Queen Victoria.

Blanche died at the age of 28, and was deeply mourned by both her husband and her uncle. She and her husband are both interred at St Peter's Church, Edensor, in accordance with Cavendish family tradition. An inscription in the Painted Hall at Chatsworth commemorates her. The 6th Duke completed his reconstruction of the house in the year of her death, 1840, and constructed an "Urn to Blanche" at the top of the Long Walk in the gardens.
