= William Sloane-Stanley =

English politician

- Born: William Sloane; 25 June 1780; South Stoneham, Hampshire
- Died: 11 April 1860 (aged 79); Paultons Park, Southampton, Hampshire
- Education: Eton College
- Alma mater: University of St Andrews
- Occupation: Politician
- Political party: Tory (to 1834); Conservative (until 1860)
- Spouse: Lady Gertrude Howard (m. 1806)
- Children: 5
- Parent(s): Hans Sloane; Sarah Fuller
- Relatives: Frederick Howard, 5th Earl of Carlisle (father-in-law)

William Sloane-Stanley (25 June 1780 – 11 April 1860) was an English politician. He served as the Tory Member of Parliament for Orford from 1807 to 1812, and for Stockbridge from 1830 to 1831.

He was the eldest son of Hans Sloane, who adopted the name and arms of Stanley in 1824, and his wife, Sarah Fuller. In 1806, he married Lady Gertrude Howard, daughter of Frederick Howard, 5th Earl of Carlisle. They had two sons and three daughters.
