= William Cavendish, 5th Duke of Devonshire =

British nobleman

His Grace The Duke of Devonshire KG
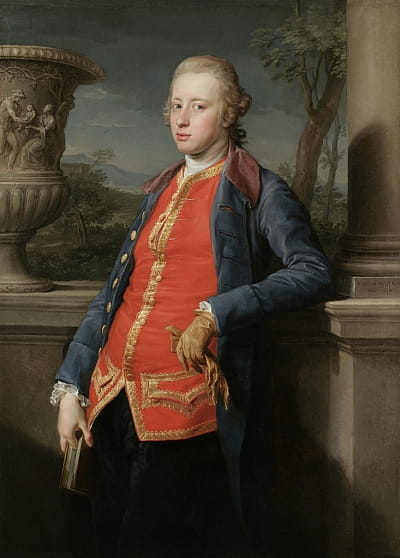
- Portrait of the Duke of Devonshire painted in Rome by Pompeo Batoni, 1768

Lord High Treasurer of Ireland
- In office 13 March 1766 – 1793
- Monarch: George III
- Preceded by: Vacant; William Cavendish, 4th Duke of Devonshire, 1764
- Succeeded by: In Commission; Richard Boyle, 2nd Earl of Shannon, First Lord

Personal details
- Born: 14 December 1748
- Died: 29 July 1811 (aged 62)
- Spouses: Lady Georgiana Spencer (m. 1774; died 1806) Lady Elizabeth Hervey (m. 1809)
- Children: Charlotte Williams (illegitimate); Georgiana Howard, Countess of Carlisle; Harriet Leveson-Gower, Countess Granville; William Cavendish, 6th Duke of Devonshire; Caroline St. Jules (illegitimate); Sir Augustus Clifford, 1st Baronet (illegitimate)
- Parents: William Cavendish, 4th Duke of Devonshire; Charlotte Boyle, 6th Baroness Clifford

William Cavendish, 5th Duke of Devonshire, KG (14 December 1748 – 29 July 1811), was a British nobleman, aristocrat, and politician. He was the eldest son of William Cavendish, 4th Duke of Devonshire, by his wife, the heiress Lady Charlotte Boyle, suo jure Baroness Clifford, who brought in considerable money and estates to the Cavendish family. He was invited to join the Cabinet on three occasions, but declined each offer. He was Lord High Treasurer of Ireland and Governor of Cork, and Lord Lieutenant of Derbyshire. In 1782, he was made a Knight of the Order of the Garter.

The 5th Duke is most widely known for his marriage to his first wife Georgiana, Duchess of Devonshire. At the age of about twenty-one, Devonshire toured Italy with William Fitzherbert which is where they commissioned the pair of portraits by Pompeo Batoni.

== Family and inheritance ==
He was married twice: first, to Lady Georgiana Spencer (1757–1806), daughter of John Spencer, 1st Earl Spencer; second, to Lady Elizabeth Foster, née Hervey (1759–1824), daughter of the 4th Earl of Bristol; Lady Elizabeth had been his mistress and his first wife's friend and confidante for more than twenty years.

=== First marriage ===
By his first wife, he had one son (named William Cavendish, 6th Duke of Devonshire, sometimes called "The Bachelor Duke", who succeeded him and who died unmarried in 1858), and two daughters: Lady Georgiana "Little G" Cavendish, later the Countess of Carlisle (wife of George Howard, 6th Earl of Carlisle), and Lady Harriet "Harryo" Cavendish, later the Countess Granville (wife of Lord Granville Leveson-Gower, who would be created 1st Earl Granville).

Both daughters left descendants and the title of Clifford barony fell into abeyance between them. The dukedom and estates would pass to a grandson of a younger brother of the 5th Duke of Devonshire; however, the 7th Duke of Devonshire would marry a daughter of the 6th Earl of Carlisle, who was thus a granddaughter of the 5th Duke and niece of the 6th Duke.

Georgiana Cavendish eventually became a socialite who had gathered around her a large circle of literary, political friends. Thomas Gainsborough and Joshua Reynolds painted her; the Gainsborough painting would be later disposed of by the 5th Duke and was recovered much later, after many vicissitudes.

=== Second marriage ===
By his second wife, Lady Elizabeth Foster, he had no legitimate issue, but the couple had two illegitimate children born before their marriage. A son, Augustus, was given the surname Clifford and became Sir Augustus Clifford and rose to be an admiral in the Royal Navy and the Gentleman Usher of the Black Rod in the House of Lords; his descendants would die out in the male line in 1895. The Duke's daughter by Lady Elizabeth, Caroline, was given a different surname from her brother, St. Jules. Caroline St. Jules would marry the Hon. George Lamb, a brother of the 2nd Viscount Melbourne (himself married to Lady Caroline Ponsonby, niece of Lady Georgiana Spencer, the 5th Duke's 1st wife). Caroline and George Lamb had no issue.

=== Mistress ===
The 5th Duke had a daughter—Charlotte, given the surname Williams—by his mistress, Charlotte Spencer, the daughter of an indigent clergyman. His first child was born shortly following his marriage to Lady Georgiana Spencer (no relation to his mistress). Charlotte would later marry suitably.

== Militia ==
When the militia was called out during the War of American Independence the duke was appointed colonel of the Derbyshire Militia by his uncle, Lord George Cavendish, Lord Lieutenant of Derbyshire. Taking command in April 1778, he immediately had to deal with a mutiny by his men over pay, and then march them to Coxheath Camp in Kent, where a large encampment had been formed. Here Duchess Georgiana was prominent among the fashionable army wives and appeared in caricatures as 'Lady Gorget', the real colonel in full uniform, interviewing recruits for the regiment. The war ended with the Peace of Paris and the militia were disembodied in March 1783. Having recently taken over as Lord Lieutenant of Derbyshire himself, the Duke resigned the command in October and appointed his younger brother Lord George Henry Cavendish as colonel in his place.

== Buxton ==
The fifth Duke would be closely involved with the nearby spa town of Buxton. He used the profits from his copper mines to transform the town into a replica of Bath, including the Crescent Hotel and an octagonal set of stables, which later became the Devonshire Dome.

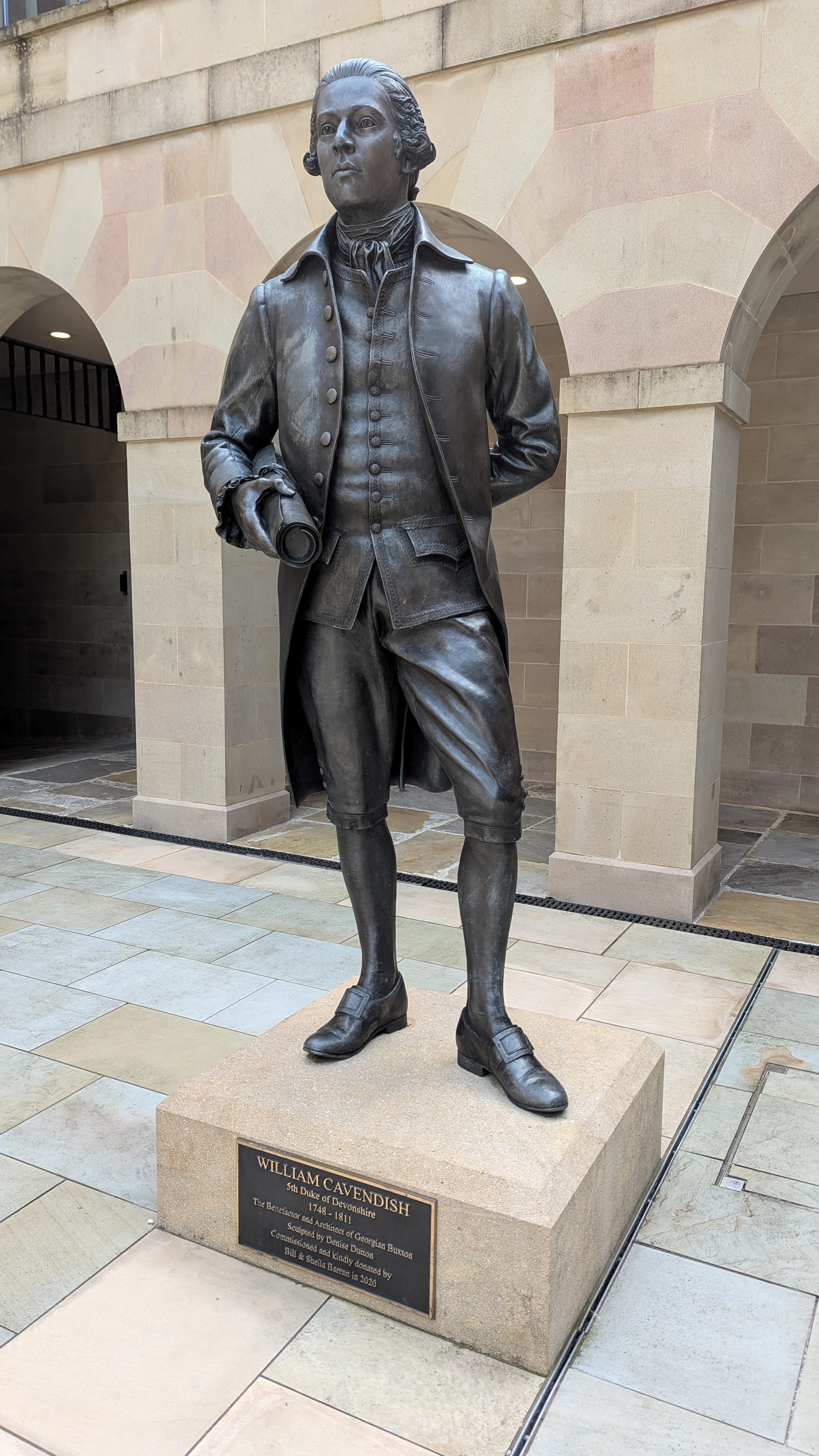
Statue of William Cavendish, 5th Duke of Devonshire in Buxton

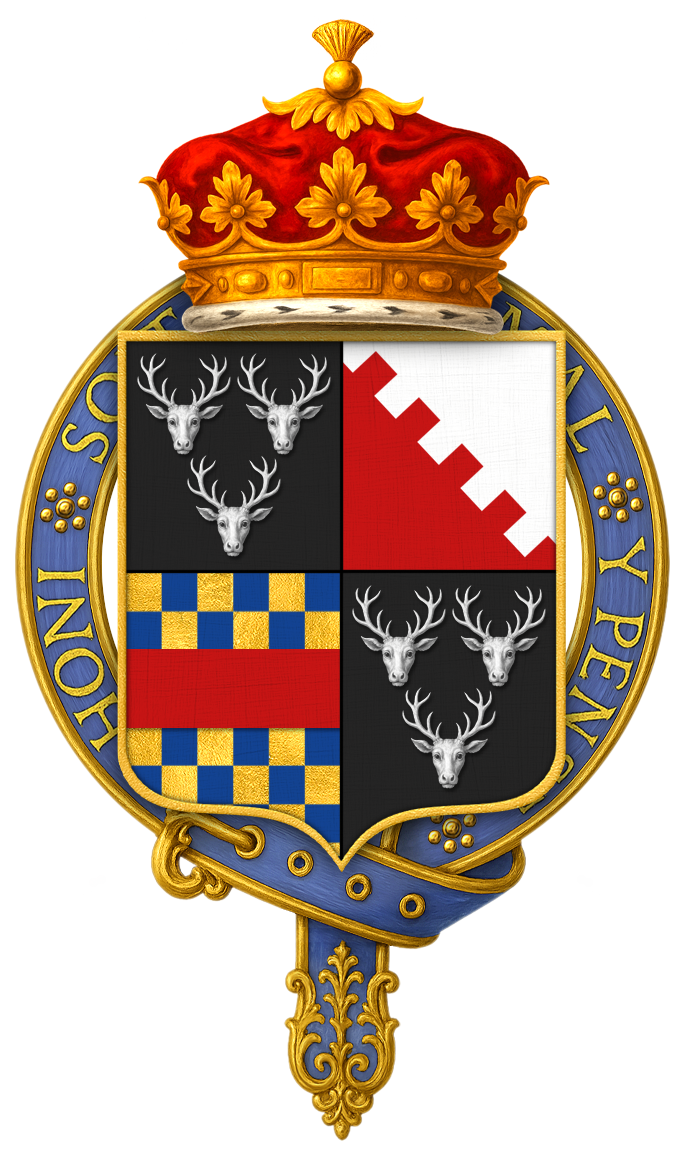
Coat of arms of William Cavendish, 5th Duke of Devonshire, KG

== Ancestors ==
Ancestors of William Cavendish, 5th Duke of Devonshire

William Cavendish, 2nd Duke of Devonshire
William Cavendish, 3rd Duke of Devonshire
Hon. Rachel Russell
William Cavendish, 4th Duke of Devonshire
John Hoskins of Oxted
Catherine Hoskins
Catherine Hale
William Cavendish, 5th Duke of Devonshire
Charles Boyle, 2nd Earl of Burlington
Richard Boyle, 3rd Earl of Burlington
Juliana Noel
Lady Charlotte Boyle, 6th Baroness Clifford
William Savile, 2nd Marquess of Halifax
Lady Dorothy Savile
Lady Mary Finch

== Cavendish in popular culture ==
- In the film The Duchess, about Georgiana, the fifth Duke is played by Ralph Fiennes.

Political offices
Vacant Title last held by The Duke of Devonshire	Lord Treasurer of Ireland; 1764–1793	In commission
Honorary titles
Preceded by Lord George Cavendish	Lord Lieutenant of Derbyshire; 1782–1811	Succeeded by The Duke of Devonshire
Peerage of England
Preceded by William Cavendish	Duke of Devonshire; 1764–1811	Succeeded by William Cavendish
Preceded by Charlotte Cavendish	Baron Clifford; 1754–1811	Succeeded by William Cavendish
