= Frederick Howard, 5th Earl of Carlisle =

British statesman, diplomat and author (1748-1825)

The Right Honourable The Earl of Carlisle KG KT PC
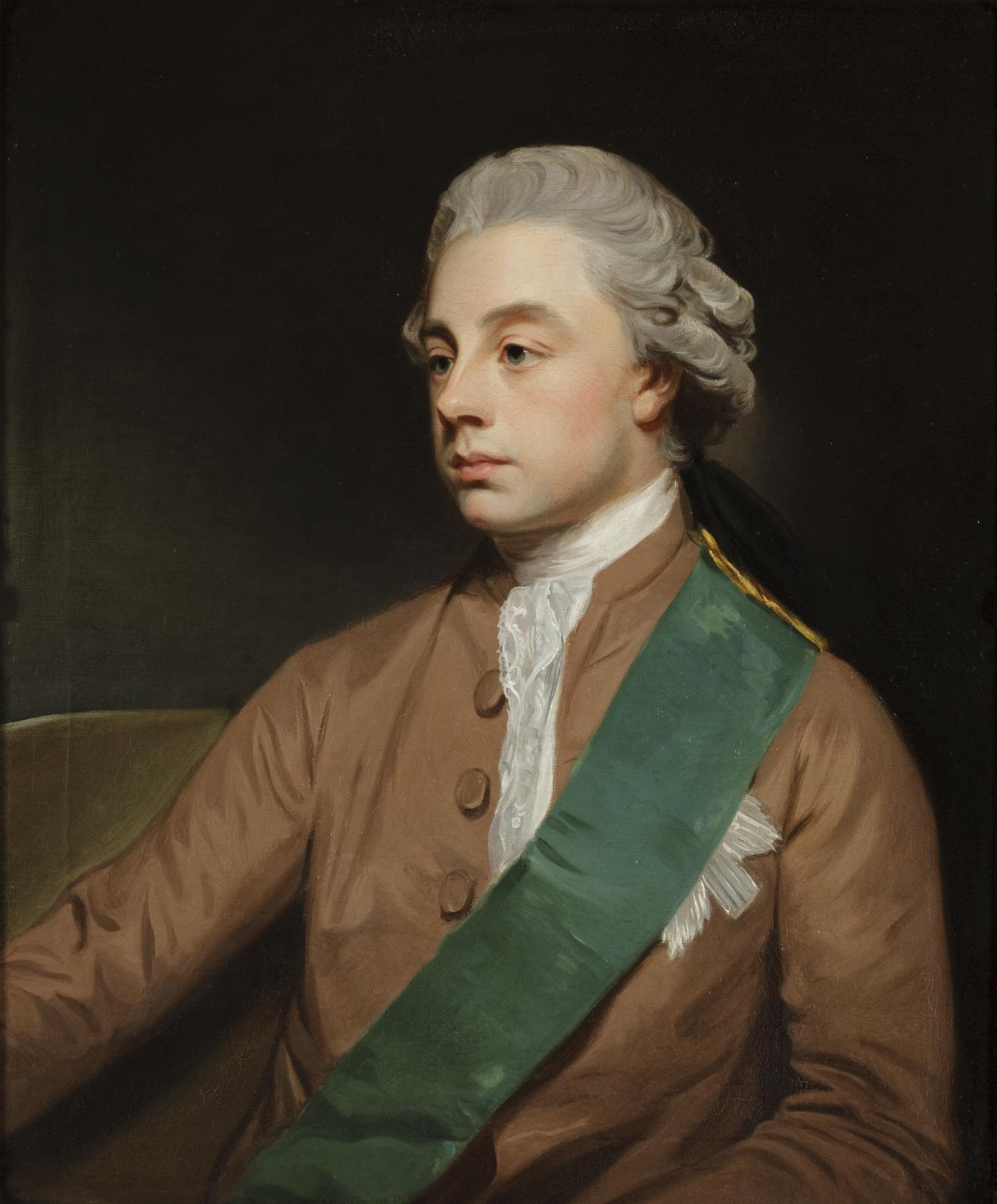
- Portrait by George Romney

First Lord of Trade
- In office 6 November 1779 – 9 December 1780
- Monarch: George III
- Prime Minister: Lord North
- Preceded by: Lord George Sackville-Germain
- Succeeded by: The Lord Grantham

Personal details
- Born: 28 May 1748
- Died: 4 September 1825 (aged 77)
- Spouse: Lady Margaret Caroline Leveson-Gower
- Children: 10, including George, Elizabeth, William, Frederick, and Henry
- Parent(s): Henry Howard, 4th Earl of Carlisle; Isabella Byron

Frederick Howard, 5th Earl of Carlisle (28 May 1748 – 4 September 1825) was a British statesman, diplomat and author.

== Life ==
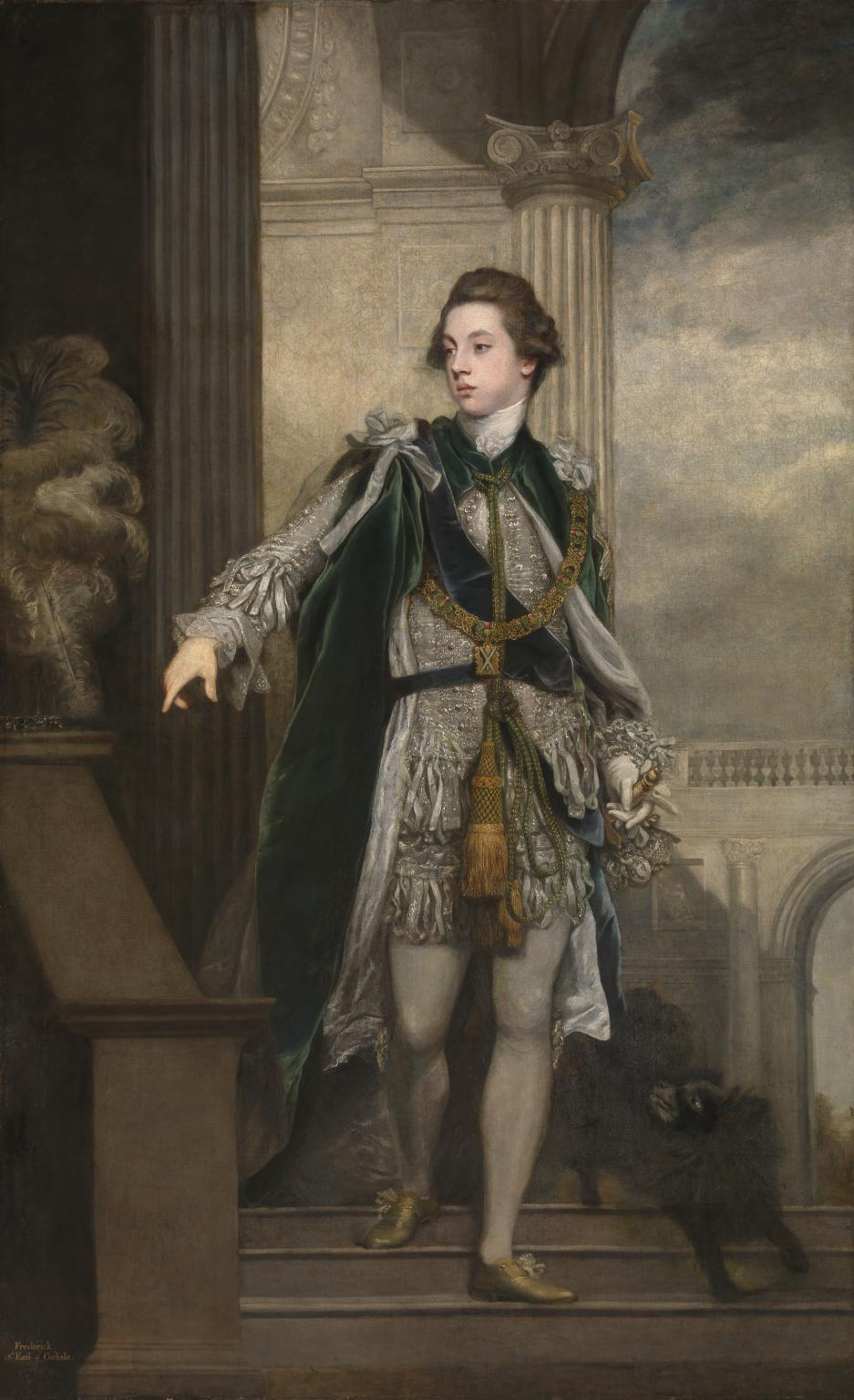
Portrait of the Earl of Carlisle. Lord Carlisle in the ceremonial robes of the Order of the Thistle, by Joshua Reynolds (1769)

He was the son of Henry Howard, 4th Earl of Carlisle and his second wife Isabella Byron. His mother was a daughter of William Byron, 4th Baron Byron and his wife Frances Berkeley, a descendant of John Berkeley, 1st Baron Berkeley of Stratton. She was also a sister of William Byron, 5th Baron Byron and a great-aunt of George Gordon Byron, 6th Baron Byron, the poet. In 1798, Carlisle was appointed guardian to Lord Byron who later lampooned him in English Bards and Scotch Reviewers.

During his youth Carlisle was mentored by George Selwyn and was chiefly known as a man of pleasure and fashion. He was created a Knight of the Thistle in 1767, and entered the House of Lords in 1770. After he had reached thirty years of age, his appointment on a Commission sent out by Frederick North, Lord North, to attempt a reconciliation with the Thirteen Colonies during the American War of Independence was received with sneers by the opposition. The failure of the embassy was not due to any incapacity on the part of the earl, but to the unpopularity of the government from which it received its authority. He was considered to have displayed so much ability that he was entrusted with the viceroyalty of Ireland in 1780.

The time was one of the greatest difficulty; for while the calm of the country was disturbed by the American War of Independence, it was drained of regular troops, and large bands of volunteers not under the control of the government had been formed. Nevertheless, the two years of Carlisle's rule passed in quietness and prosperity, and the institution of a national bank and other measures which he effected left permanently beneficial results upon the commerce of the island. In 1789, in the discussions as to the regency, Carlisle took a prominent part on the side of the prince of Wales.

In 1791 he opposed William Pitt the Younger's policy of resistance to the dismemberment of the Ottoman Empire by the Russian Empire; but on the outbreak of the French Revolution he left the opposition and vigorously maintained the cause of war. He resigned from the Order of the Thistle and was created a Knight of the Garter in 1793. In 1815 he opposed the enactment of the Corn Laws; but from this time till his death, he took no important part in public life.

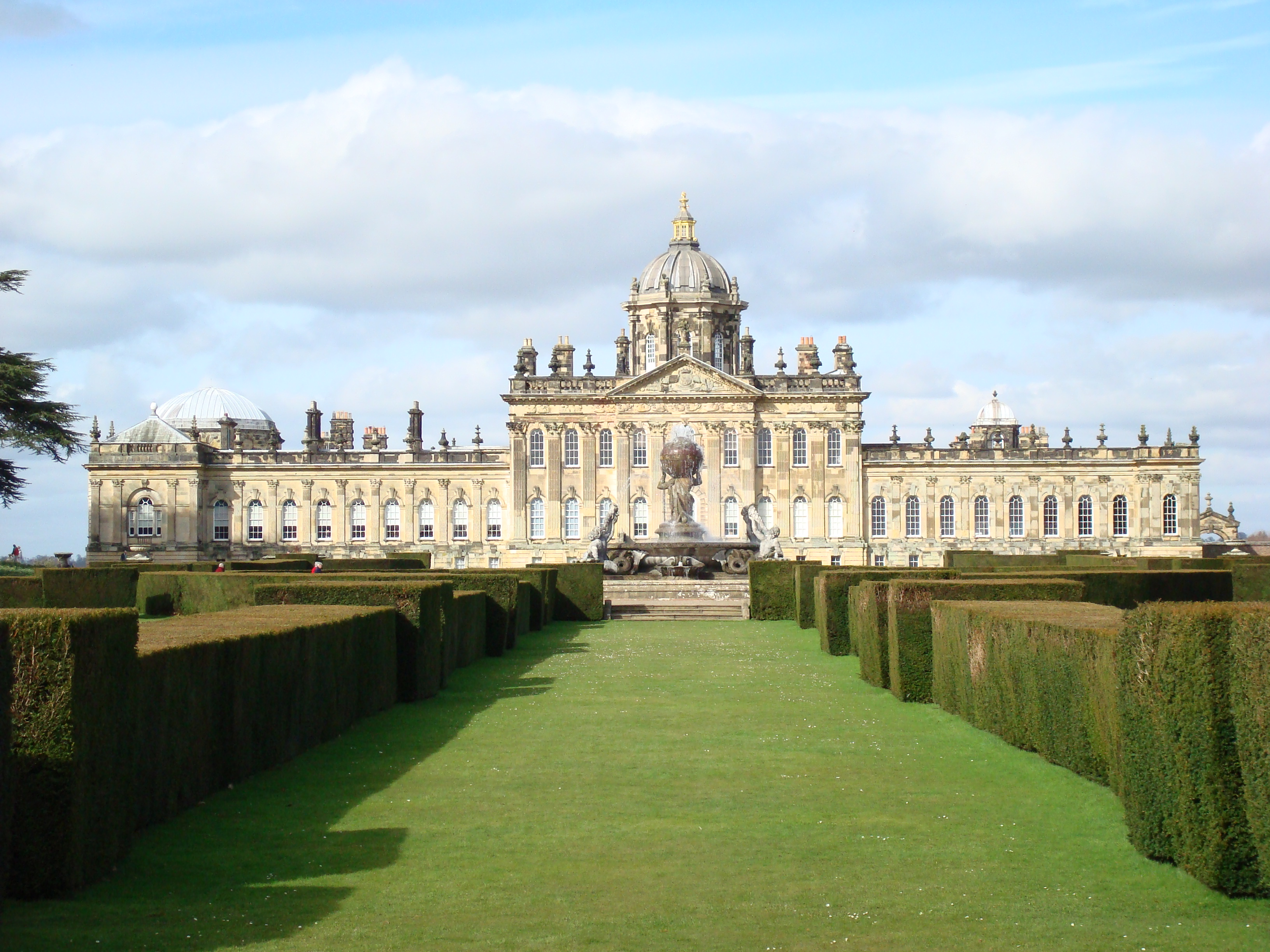
Castle Howard, North Yorkshire

In 1798 he was one of the syndicate who bought the Orleans Collection of paintings, many of his share of which were housed in Castle Howard, where some remain.

== Family ==
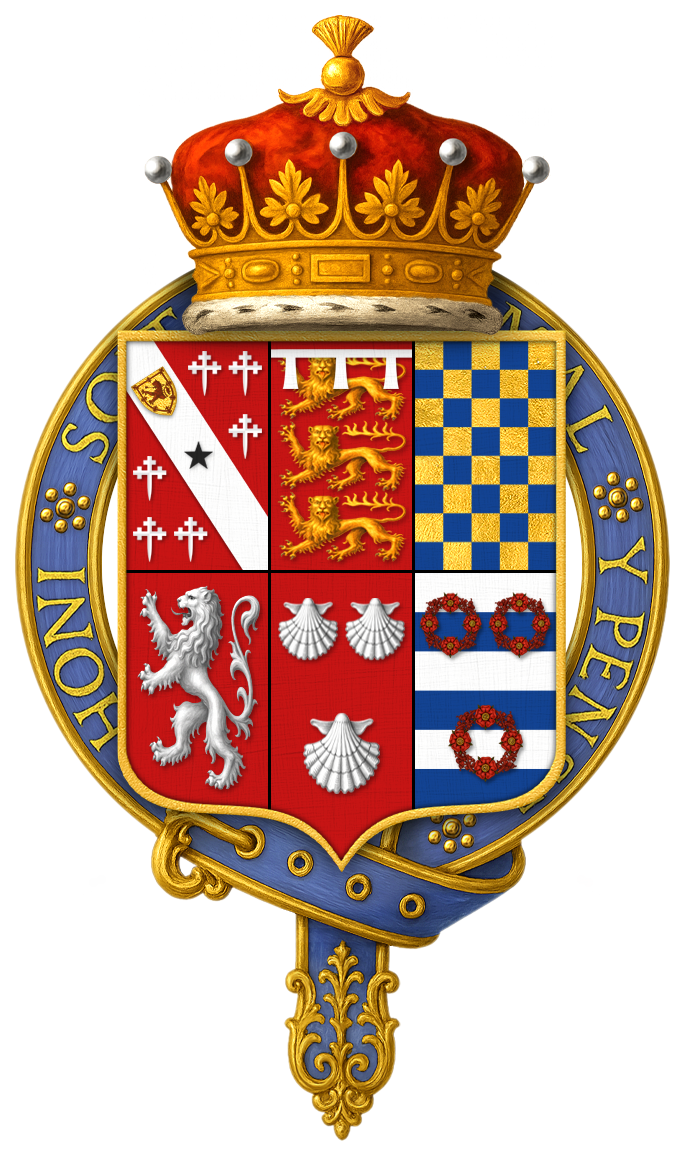
Quartered arms of Frederick Howard, 5th Earl of Carlisle, KG

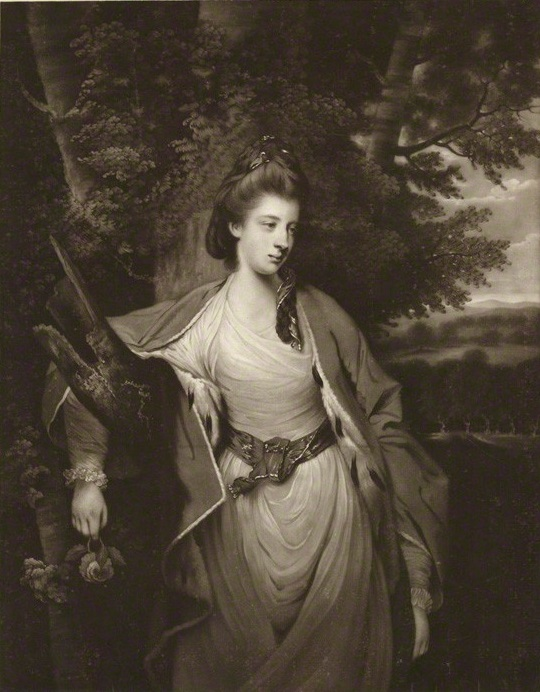
Margaret Caroline Howard, mezzotint by James Watson after Sir Joshua Reynolds, 1773

On 22 March 1770, Frederick married Lady Margaret Caroline Leveson-Gower (died 27 January 1824), daughter of Granville Leveson-Gower, 1st Marquess of Stafford and his wife, Lady Louisa Egerton, herself the daughter of Scroop Egerton, 1st Duke of Bridgewater.

They had ten children:

- Lady Isabella Caroline Howard (1771–1848), who married John Campbell, 1st Baron Cawdor, on 27 July 1789 and had issue
- George Howard, 6th Earl of Carlisle (17 September 1773 – 1848), who married and had issue
- Lady Charlotte Howard (15 November 1774 – 1774)
- Lady Susan Maria Howard (26 February 1776 – 1783)
- Lady Louisa Howard (27 March 1778 – 1781)
- Lady Elizabeth Howard (13 November 1780 – 29 November 1825), who married John Manners, 5th Duke of Rutland, on 22 April 1799 and had issue
- William Howard (1781–1843), Member of Parliament
- Lady Gertrude Howard (1783–1870), who married William Sloane-Stanley on 23 June 1806 and had issue
- Maj. Frederick Howard (6 December 1785 – 18 June 1815), killed in action at Waterloo, who married Frances Susan Lambton and had two sons, including Frederick John Howard
- Henry Edward John Howard (1795–1868), who married and had issue

The 5th Earl was also reputedly the natural father of Howard Staunton (1810–1874), an English chess master regarded as having been the world's strongest player from 1843 to 1851, according to information "gleaned" by chess historian H. J. R. Murray from various sources, although record of Staunton's birth or baptism has never been found.

He was a lover of the famous courtesan Kitty Kennedy.

== Works ==
Carlisle was the author of some political tracts, a number of poems, and two tragedies:

- Poems, London, 1773
- The Father's Revenge (a tragedy in five acts), London, 1783
- To Sir J. Reynolds, (verses), London, 1790
- A Letter to Earl FitzWilliam, London, 1795
- The Crisis, London, 1798
- Unite or Fall, London, 1798
- The Stepmother, (a tragedy), London, 1800
- The Tragedies and Poems of Frederick, Earl of Carlisle, London, 1801
- Verses on the Death on Lord Nelson, London, 1806
- Thoughts on the present Condition of the Stage, London, 1808
- Miscellanies, London, 1820

== Notes ==
Political offices
Preceded by John Shelley	Treasurer of the Household; 1777–1779	Succeeded by The Lord Onslow
Preceded by Lord George Germain	First Lord of Trade; 1779–1780	Succeeded by The Lord Grantham
Preceded by The Earl of Buckinghamshire	Lord Lieutenant of Ireland; 1780–1782	Succeeded by The Duke of Portland
Preceded by The Earl Talbot	Lord Steward; 1782–1783	Succeeded by The Duke of Rutland
Preceded by The Duke of Grafton	Lord Privy Seal; 1783	Succeeded by The Duke of Rutland
Honorary titles
Preceded by Marquess of Carmarthen	Lord Lieutenant of the East Riding of Yorkshire; 1780–1782	Succeeded by Marquess of Carmarthen
Preceded by The Duke of Leeds	Lord Lieutenant of the East Riding of Yorkshire; 1799–1807	Succeeded by The Lord Mulgrave
Peerage of England
Preceded by Henry Howard	Earl of Carlisle; 1758–1825	Succeeded by George Howard
