= Isabella Howard, Countess of Carlisle =

British aristocrat and writer

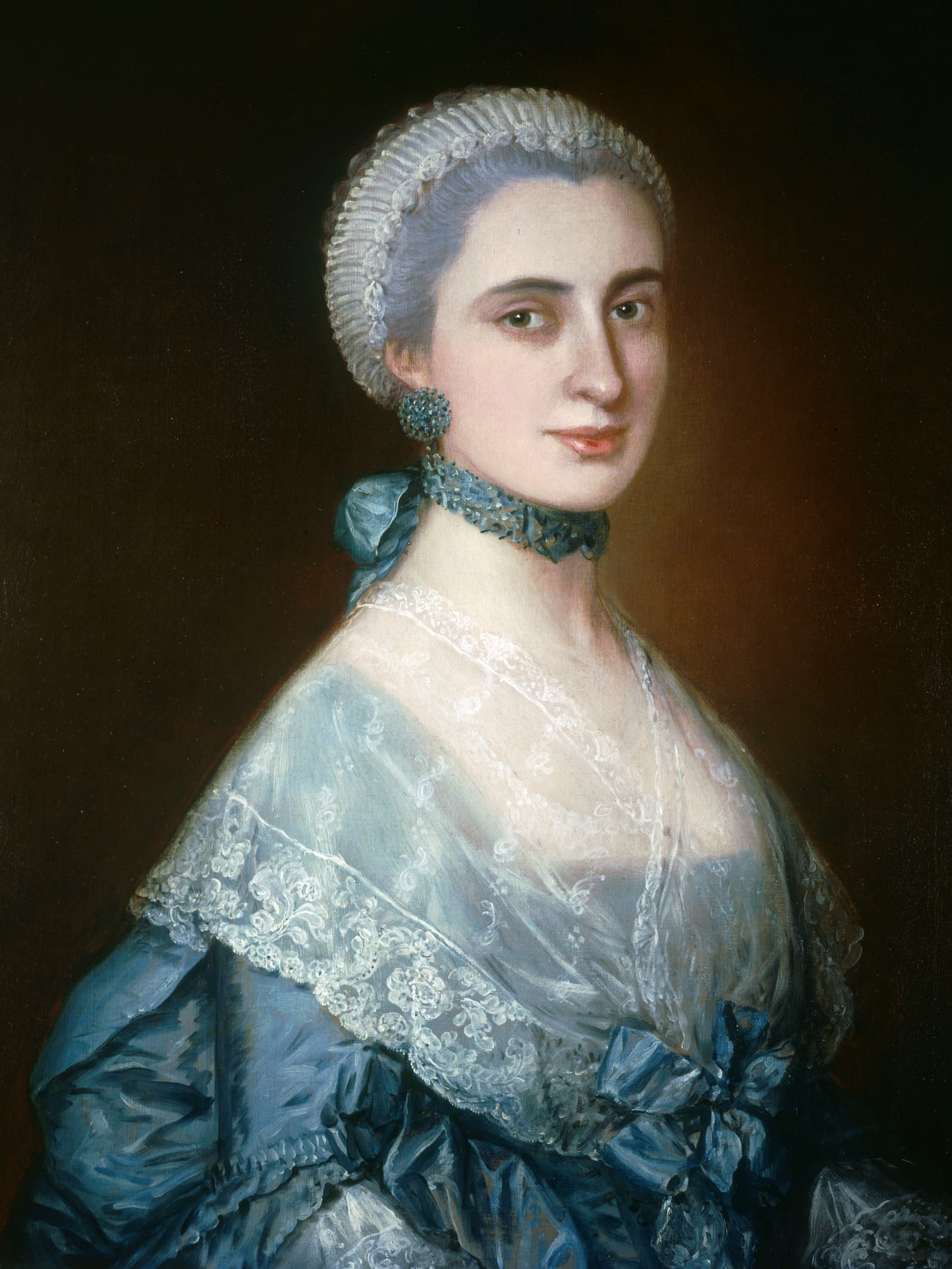
Isabella Howard, Countess of Carlisle painted by Thomas Gainsborough (Castle Howard collection)

Isabella Howard, Countess of Carlisle (née Byron; 10 November 1721 – 22 January 1795), was a British aristocrat, writer, and traveller. On marrying in 1743 she became the Countess of Carlisle, and following her husband's death was styled the Dowager Countess of Carlisle.

== Early life ==
Isabella was the eldest child of William, 4th Baron Byron and his much-younger third wife Frances Berkeley. Five younger brothers quickly followed, including William, 5th Baron Byron and navy officer John Byron (the grandfather of the poet Lord Byron). Her childhood was divided between the Byrons' ancestral seat at Newstead Abbey in Nottinghamshire, and their London townhouse on Great Marlborough Street.

== Marriages and issue ==
At the age of 21, Isabella married 49-year-old widower Henry Howard, 4th Earl of Carlisle and became mistress of Castle Howard in Yorkshire. The couple had five children:

- Anne Howard (1744–99), a Lady of the Bedchamber to Princess Amelia
- Frances Howard (1745–1808), who married John Radcliffe
- Elizabeth Howard (1747–1813), who firstly married Peter Delme and, secondly, Charles Garnier
- Frederick Howard, 5th Earl of Carlisle (1748–1825), who married Caroline Leveson-Gower
- Juliana Howard (1750–1849)

Following the death of her husband in 1758, Isabella rushed into a whirlwind engagement with a lawyer and art historian 14 years her junior, Sir William Musgrave, 6th Baronet. The marriage began happily, but the two slowly discovered they were mismatched and separated in 1769.

== Years abroad and reputation ==
Following her separation, Isabella spent 13 years travelling Europe, taking in France, Switzerland and Italy. Unable to resist the prospect of romance, she incurred the wrath of her frustrated son first by encouraging an unsuitable match for her youngest daughter Juliana, and then becoming increasingly reliant on the company of a German soldier. Though repeatedly urged to return to England, she instead continued on her travels, racking up debts and eventually attempting to pass off her companion as a German aristocrat in order to allow him access to royal courts.

While travelling she entertained herself by writing a compilation of 'maxims' intended as general matrimonial and etiquette advice for younger female relatives and friends. When living in Paris shortly before the French Revolution, she was visited by her notorious nephew Jack Byron (father of the poet Lord Byron) and was persuaded to give him money and attempt to heal the growing rift between him and his long-suffering parents.

== Writing and later life ==
Isabella immersed herself in the arts, being admired as a talented singer, musical hostess, sketcher and poet. Her poetry was circulated amongst fashionable friends, and one particularly admired defense of the passions, written in the 1750s, was published in 1771.

When eventually compelled to return to England, Isabella settled at Bath and sought a publisher for her compilation of etiquette advice – it was published as Thoughts in the Form of Maxims in the winter of 1789, and immediately stirred up interest amongst those who thought her entirely unqualified to be giving advice on proper conduct.

Cut off from society by lack of funds and social disapproval of her escapades abroad, Isabella died at home in Bath on 22 January 1795 and was buried in the nearby village of Weston the following week.

== Bibliography ==
- Emily Brand, The Fall of the House of Byron (John Murray, 2020).
- Christopher Ridgeway, 'Isabella, Fourth Countess of Carlisle: No Life by Halves', in Maids and Mistresses: Celebrating 300 Years of Women and the Yorkshire Country House, ed. Ruth Larson (2004).
