= Samuel Wallis =

Royal Navy officer and explorer (1728–1795)

Captain Samuel Wallis
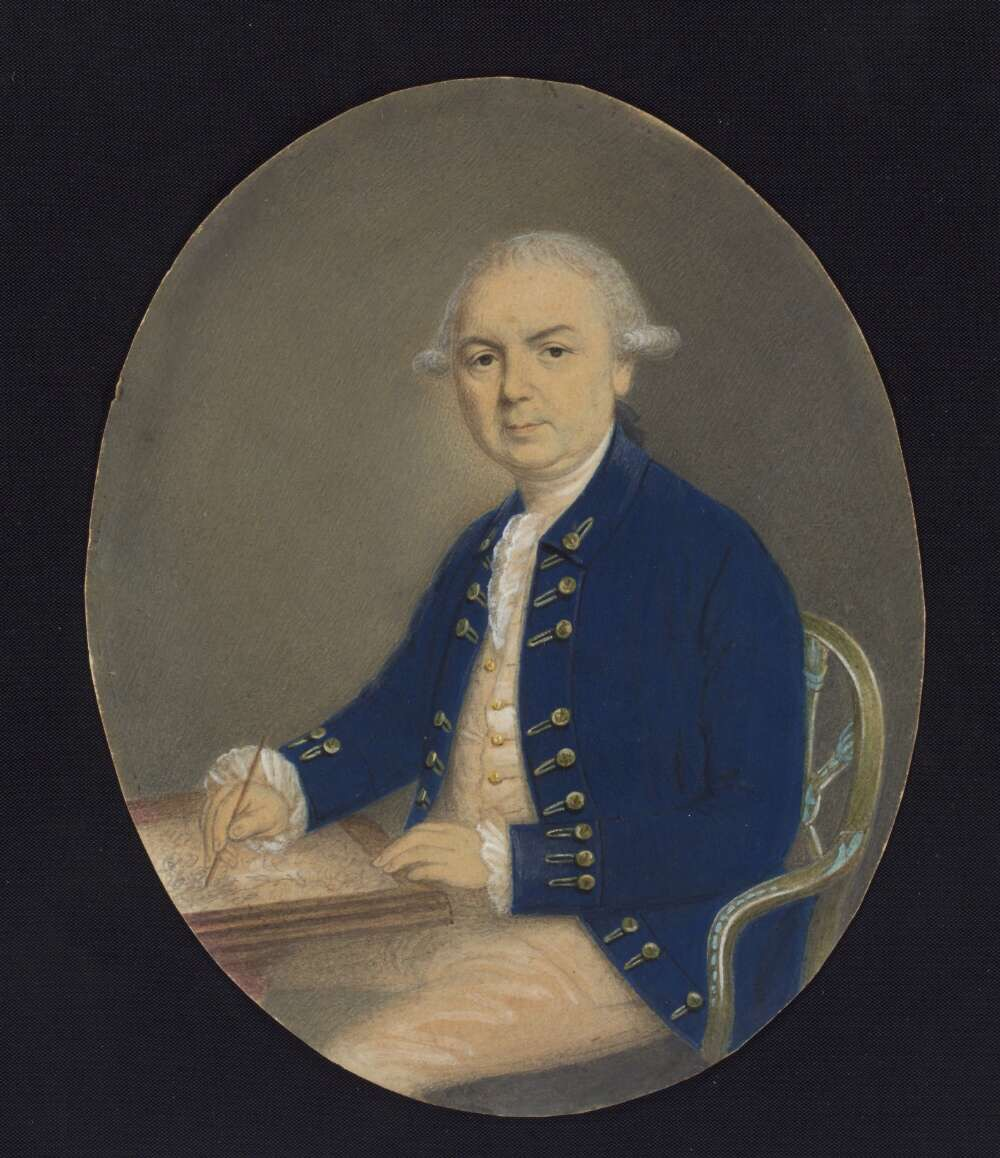
- Portrait of Samuel Wallis by Henry Stubble, c. 1785
- Born: 23 April 1728; Fentenwoon, Cornwall
- Died: 21 January 1795 (aged 71); Devonshire Street, London
- Spouse: Betty Hearle
- Military career
- Allegiance: Great Britain
- Branch: Royal Navy
- Service years: c.1748–1795
- Rank: Captain
- Commands: HMS Swan; HMS Port Mahon; HMS Prince of Orange; HMS Dolphin; HMS Torbay; HMS Dublin; HMS Queen
- Known for: Pacific exploration
- Conflicts: Seven Years' War; Action of 8 June 1755; Louisbourg Expedition; Siege of Louisbourg; Capture of Belle Île; American Revolutionary War
- Other work: Extra Commissioner of the Navy

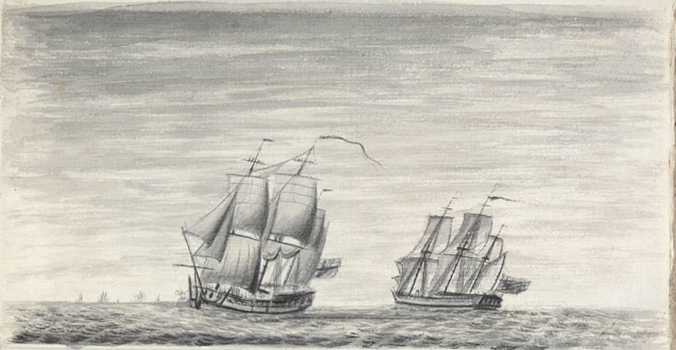
Dolphin and Swallow drawn by Samuel Wallis, c. 1767

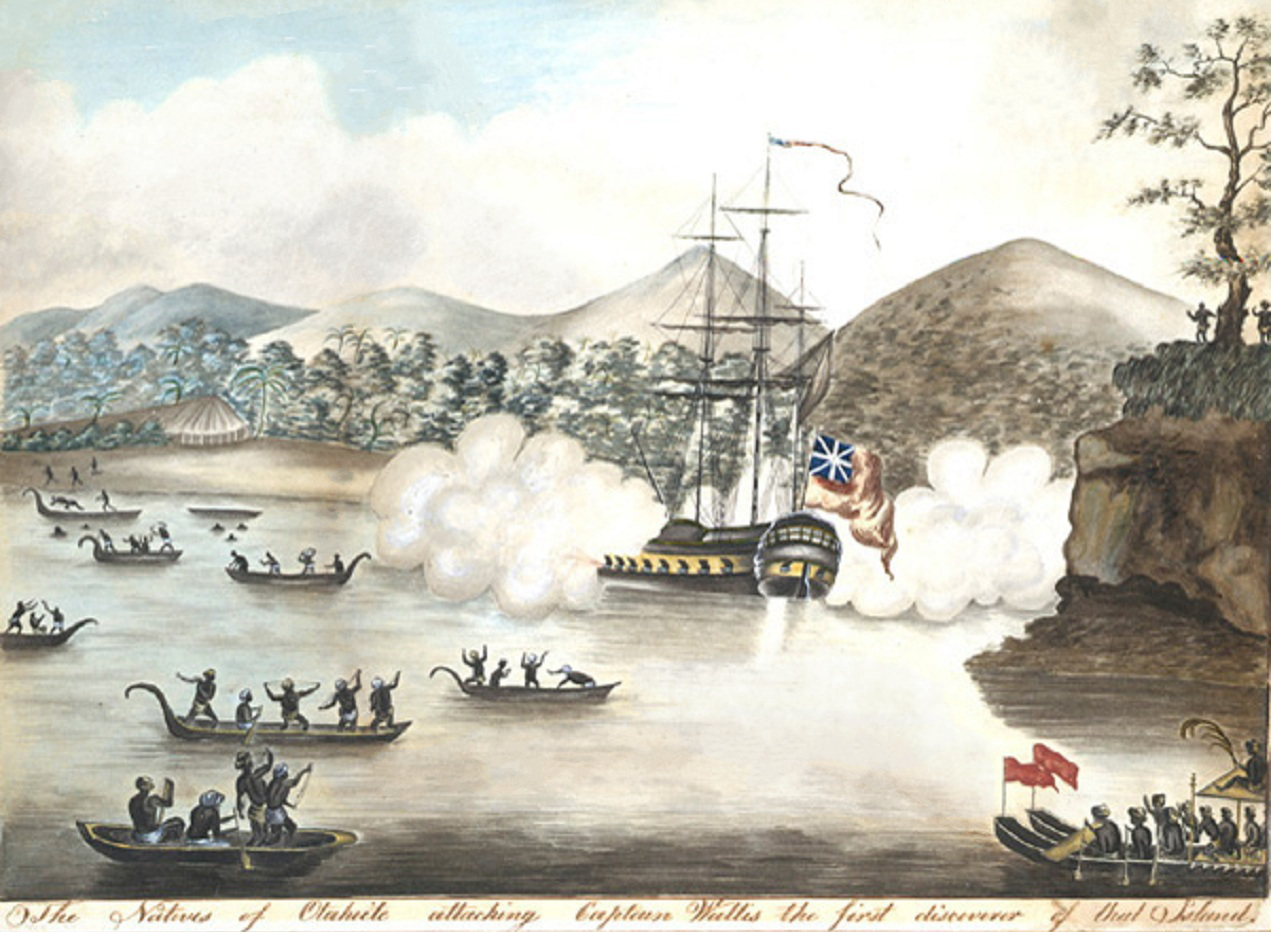
Captain Wallis facing Tahitians' hostility.

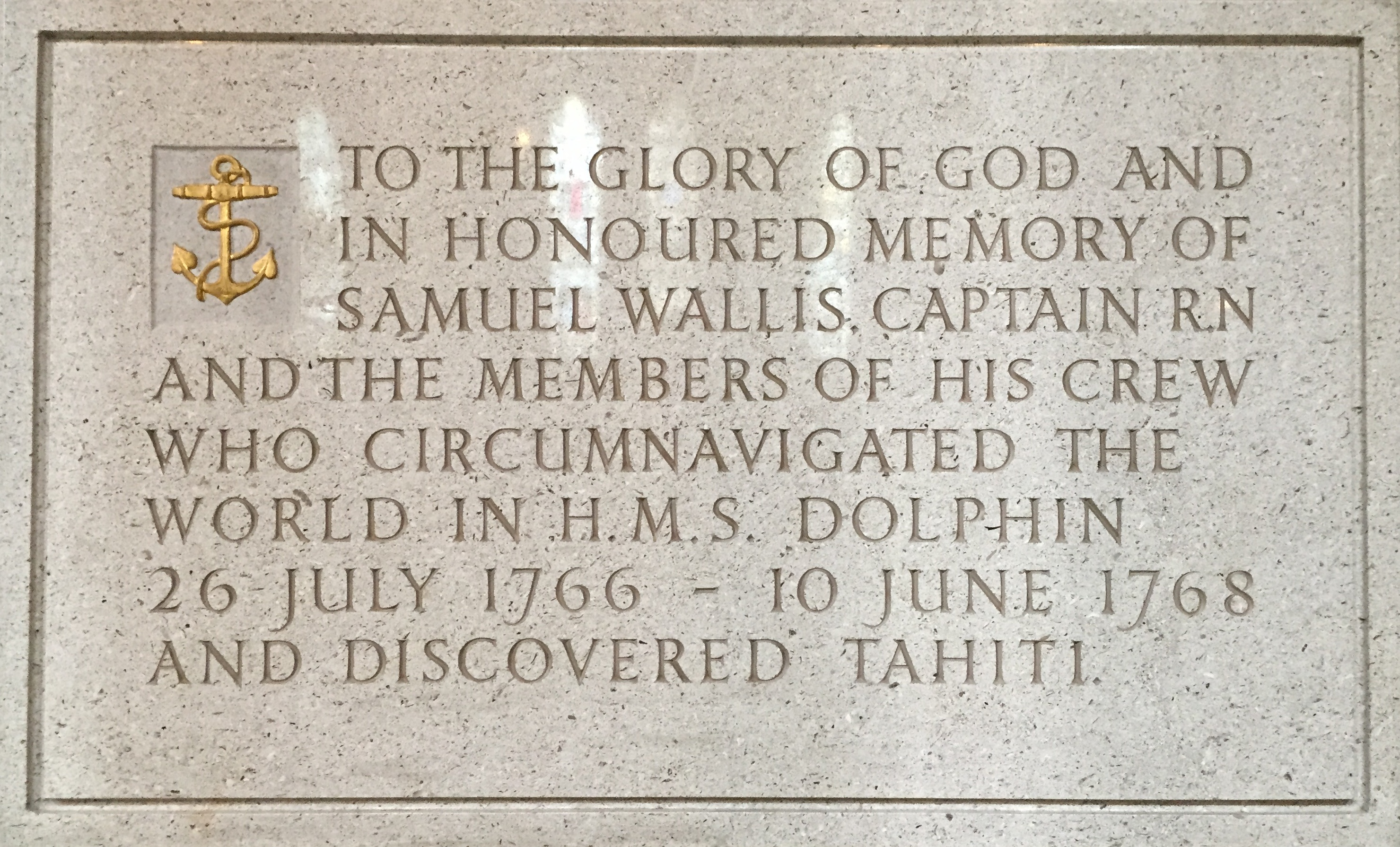
Memorial to Samuel Wallis and the crew in Truro Cathedral, Cornwall.

Captain Samuel Wallis (23 April 1728 – 21 January 1795) was a Royal Navy officer and explorer who made the first recorded visit by a European navigator to Tahiti.

== Biography ==
Wallis was born at Fenteroon Farm, near Camelford, Cornwall. He served under John Byron. On 19 October 1746, he became a lieutenant. On 30 June 1756, he was promoted to commander. On 8 April 1757, he was promoted to captain and was given the command of HMS Dolphin as commander of an expedition accompanied by Philip Carteret on HMS Swallow with an assignment to circumnavigate the globe. As was reported in the press, he was also tasked with discovering the Southern Continent. The two ships were parted by a storm shortly after sailing through the Strait of Magellan. In June 1767, the expedition made the first European landfall on Tahiti, which he named "King George the Third's Island" in honour of the King. Wallis himself was ill and remained in his cabin so lieutenant Tobias Furneaux was the first to set foot, hoisting a pennant and turning a turf, taking possession in the name of His Majesty. He described Tahiti as having a very good climate and the island being 'one of the most healthy as well as delightful spots in the world'.

HMS Dolphin's purser, John Harrison, (Note: Not to be confused with John Harrison, the developer of the first marine chronometer) had the skills necessary to calculate longitude by the Lunar Distance method. This was an early version of the technique, predating the first nautical almanacs which included tables that shortened the calculation process. Consequently, Harrison had lengthy calculations (taking about four hours) to turn each observation into a longitude position. Wallis freely admitted that he did not understand these calculations. Determining the longitude (together with the latitude) of Tahiti meant that the later voyage by James Cook had no difficulty in finding the island. The lunar distance longitude was added to by observation of a solar eclipse which occurred during Dolphin's stay, which provided an additional fix. The two longitudes obtained provided a level of precision greater than could be achieved by previous navigators.

Dolphin stayed in Matavai Bay in Tahiti for over a month. Wallis went on to name or rename five more islands in the Society Islands and six atolls in the Tuamotu Islands, as well as confirming the locations of Rongerik and Rongelap in the Marshall Islands. He renamed the Polynesian island of Uvea as Wallis after himself, before reaching Tinian in the Mariana Islands. He continued to Batavia, where many of the crew died from dysentery, then via the Cape of Good Hope to England, arriving in May 1768.

Following his return in England, Wallis was able to pass on useful information to James Cook, who was due to depart shortly for the Pacific, and some of the crew from the Dolphin sailed with Cook. Although Cook carried an official report of Wallis's circumnavigation, it is not known whether the two met prior to Cook's departure in August 1768.

In 1780, Wallis was appointed an Extra Commissioner of the Navy.

== See also ==
- European and American voyages of scientific exploration
- The Well-Travelled Goat

== Bibliography ==
- Glyndwr Williams, 'Wallis, Samuel (1728–1795)', Oxford Dictionary of National Biography, Oxford University Press, 2004; online edn, May 2005 accessed 10 Dec 2007
- Quanchi, Max; Robson, John (2005). Historical Dictionary of the Discovery and Exploration of the Pacific Islands. Scarecrow Press, Inc. ISBN 0810853957.
- Hawkesworth, John; Byron, John; Wallis, Samuel; Carteret, Philip; Cook, James; Banks, Joseph (1773), An account of the voyages undertaken by the order of His present Majesty for making discoveries in the Southern Hemisphere, and successively performed by Commodore Byron, Captain Wallis, Captain Carteret, and Captain Cook, in the Dolphin, the Swallow, and the Endeavour drawn up from the journals which were kept by the several commanders, and from the papers of Joseph Banks, esq, London Printed for W. Strahan and T. Cadell, Volume I, Volumes II–III
