= Lady Elizabeth Delmé and Her Children =

Painting by Joshua Reynolds

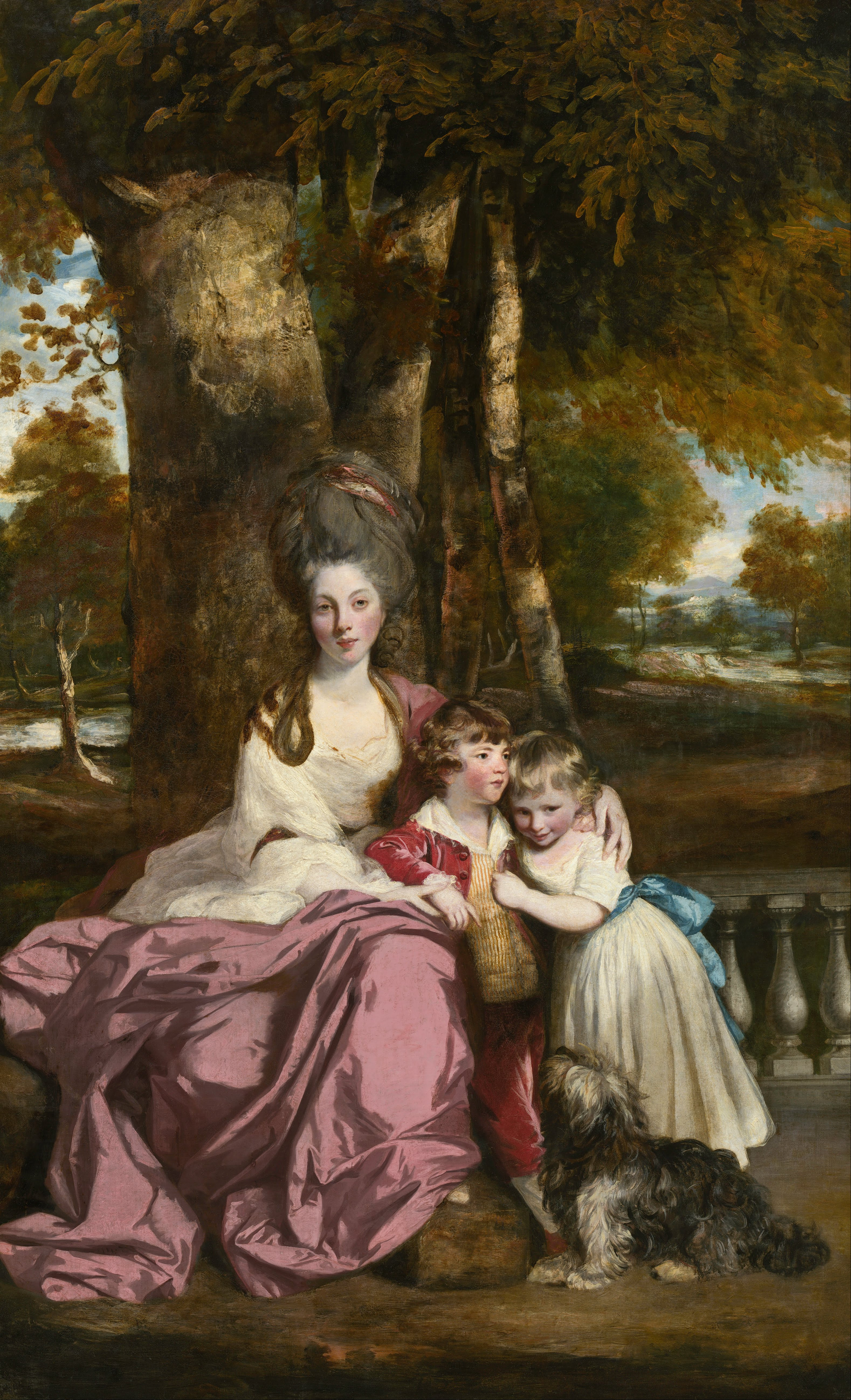
- Artist: Joshua Reynolds
- Year: 1779
- Medium: oil on canvas
- Dimensions: 238.4 cm × 147.2 cm (93 7/8 in × 57 15/16 in)
- Location: National Gallery of Art; Washington, D.C.

Lady Elizabeth Delmé and Her Children (1779) is an oil on canvas portrait by Joshua Reynolds. It was given to the National Gallery of Art in Washington DC in 1937. The NGA describes the work as a "majestic group portrait".

Born Lady Elizabeth Howard (1746-1813), Lady Elizabeth (Howard) Delmé was the third daughter of the 4th Earl of Carlisle, and sat for Reynolds with her children John and Isabella Elizabeth in April and June 1777. Reynolds was the chief proponent of the Grand Manner, and, as the NGA points out, the two years involved in completing the portrait would have aged the children noticeably. "But Reynolds worked from abstract principles of design rather than observation of nature," the NGA writes, "One of his conceptions for Grand Manner likenesses was: Each person should have the expression which men of his rank generally exhibit. Reynolds therefore suppressed psychological individuality to gain a grandeur appropriate for these aristocrats."

In Grand Manner fashion, Reynolds alluded to the Madonnas of Raphael (such as the Madonna of the Goldfinch and the Madonna of the Meadow) in the triangular configuration of the sitters and alluded as well to the art of Rembrandt and Titian in the browns of the background. Reynolds was paid three hundred pounds for the work in 1780, and touched up and revarnished the picture in 1789.

Cynthia Saltzman writes in Old Masters, New Worlds (2009) that "Lady Delmé has a long, elegant face, heavy-lidded eyes, and towering powdered hair. She wears a white dress and a cloak that covers her knees in a cascade of rose-colored satin that speaks both to her beauty and to the luxury at her command." Saltzman notes that Lady Delmé is one of the finest representatives of Reynolds's intent to raise portraiture to the level of history painting. English portraiture of the period "flattered the sitter", Saltzman explains, by depicting the sitter as a member of a powerful ruling class whose very existence made the world a better place.

== Her life ==
Lady Elizabeth Howard (1746-June 1813), married twice, first on 16 Feb 1769 to Peter Delmé, M.P. (1748-1789), and secondly on 13 January 1794 to Capt. Charles Garnier, R.N., (d.1796 by drowning).

Ruvigny described Lady Elizabeth as "the beauty of the Court of Queen Charlotte".
