= HMS Dolphin (1751) =

Frigate of the Royal Navy

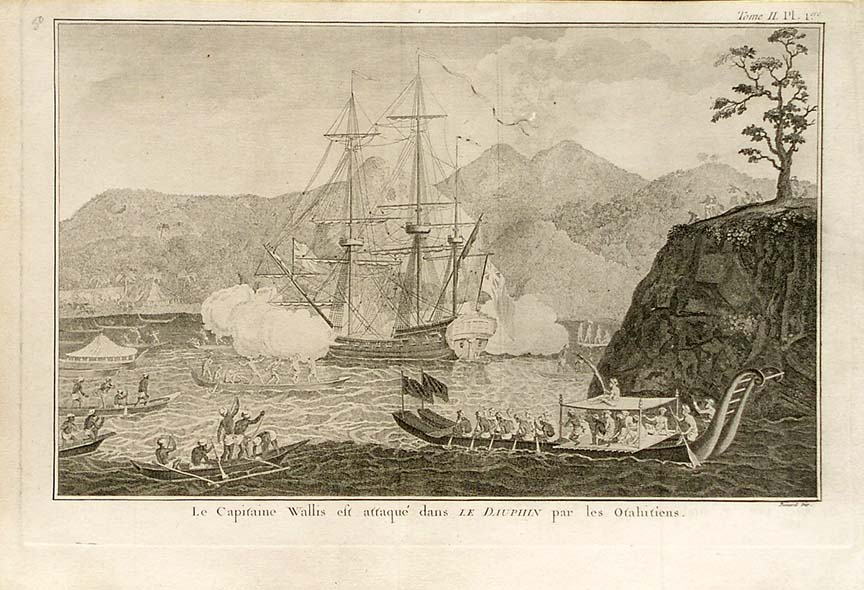
- HMS Dolphin at Tahiti 1767

History

Great Britain
- Name: HMS Dolphin
- Ordered: 26 September 1747
- Builder: Woolwich Dockyard, England
- Laid down: 3 August 1748
- Launched: 1 May 1751
- Commissioned: June 1752
- Out of service: Paid off in September 1776
- Fate: Broken up, January 1777

General characteristics
- Class & type: Sixth-rate frigate
- Tons burthen: 511 2/94 (bm)
- Length: 113 ft (34 m) (gundeck); 93 ft 4 in (28.45 m) (keel)
- Beam: 32 ft 1 in (9.78 m)
- Depth of hold: 11 ft (3.4 m)
- Propulsion: Sails
- Sail plan: Full-rigged ship
- Complement: 160
- Armament: Lower deck: 2 × 9-pounders (aft); Upper deck: 20 × 9-pounders; Quarterdeck: 2 × 3-pounders

HMS Dolphin was a 24-gun sixth-rate frigate of the Royal Navy. Launched in 1751, she was used as a survey ship from 1764 and made two circumnavigations of the world under the successive commands of John Byron and Samuel Wallis. She was the first ship to circumnavigate the world twice. She remained in service until she was paid off in September 1776. She was broken up in early 1777.

== Construction ==
Built to the 1745 Establishment, Dolphin was originally ordered from the private yard of Earlsman Sparrow in Rotherhithe (under contract dated 7 October 1747). Following Sparrow's bankruptcy in 1748, the order was moved to Woolwich Dockyard. In order to reduce the likely incidence of shipworm, Dolphin's hull was copper-sheathed ahead of her first voyage of circumnavigation in 1764.

== Early service ==
Not long after her commissioning, the hostilities of the Seven Years' War had escalated and spread to Europe, and in May 1756 Britain declared war on France of the Ancien Régime. Dolphin was pressed into service throughout the conflict, and was present at the Battle of Minorca in 1756 when a fleet under Admiral John Byng failed to relieve Port Mahon, Britain's main base in the Western Mediterranean (as a result of which Byng was later court-martialled and shot).

== First circumnavigation ==
With Britain's successful conclusion of the Seven Years' War in 1763, her attentions turned towards consolidating her gains and continuing to expand her trade and influence at the expense of the other competing European powers. The Pacific Ocean was beginning to be opened up by exploratory European vessels, and interest had developed in this route as an alternate to reach the East Indies. This interest was compounded by theories put forward which suggested that a large, hitherto-unknown continental landmass (Terra Australis Incognita) must exist at southern latitudes to "counterbalance" the northern hemisphere's landmasses.

No longer in a state of war, the Admiralty had more funds, ships and men at her disposal to devote to exploratory ventures. Accordingly, an expedition was soon formed with instructions to investigate and establish a South Atlantic base from which Britain could keep an eye on voyages bound for the Pacific. Another purpose was to generally explore for unknown lands which could then be claimed and exploited by the Crown, and to reach the Far East if necessary. Dolphin was selected as lead vessel for this voyage, and she was to be accompanied by the sloop HMS Tamar.

Her captain was Commodore John Byron, a 42-year-old veteran of the sea, and younger brother to the profligate William Byron, 5th Baron Byron. Between June 1764 and May 1766 Dolphin completed the circumnavigation of the globe. This was the first such circumnavigation of less than two years. During this voyage, in 1765, Byron took possession of the Falkland Islands on behalf of Britain on the grounds of prior discovery, and in so doing was nearly the cause of a war between Great Britain and Spain, both countries having armed fleets ready to contest the sovereignty of the barren islands. Later Byron visited islands of Tuamotus, Tokelau and Nikunau in the Gilbert Islands, putting them on European maps for the first time (in European circles, Nikunau went by the name "Byron Island" for over 100 years); and visited Tinian in the Northern Marianas Islands.

== Second circumnavigation ==
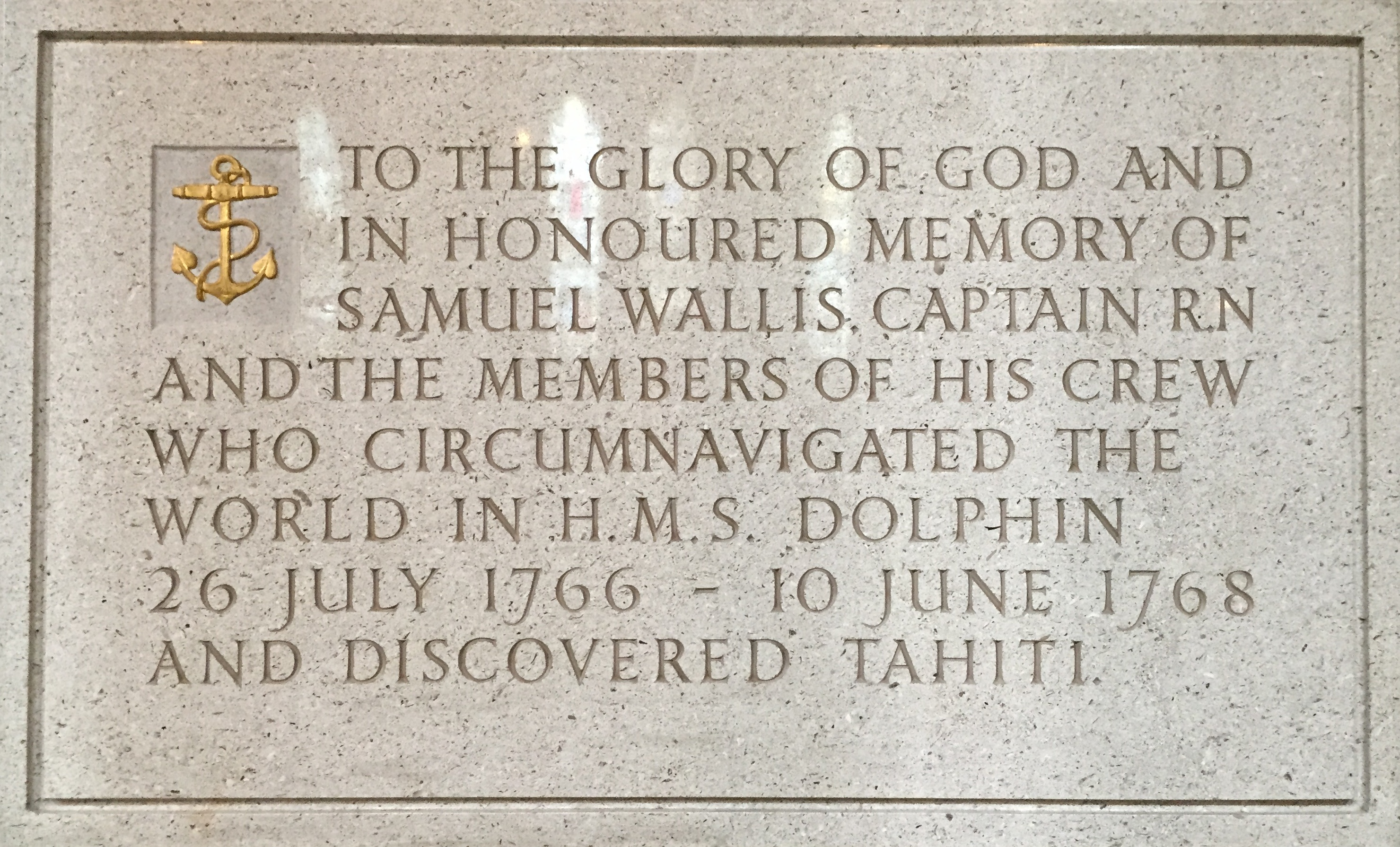
Memorial to Samuel Wallis and the crew in Truro Cathedral in Cornwall

Dolphin circumnavigated the world for a second time, under the command of Samuel Wallis. Her master's mate, John Gore, was among a number of the crew from Byron's circumnavigation who crewed with Wallis. The master on this voyage, George Robertson, subsequently wrote a book The discovery of Tahiti; a journal of the second voyage of H.M.S. Dolphin round the world under the command of Captain Wallis, R.N., in the years 1766, 1767, and 1768, written by her master. Dolphin sailed in 1766 in the company of HMS Swallow, under the command of Philip Carteret, who had served on Byron's circumnavigation.

During the circumnavigation, the ship carried a new system for the distillation of fresh water from salt water using heated steam as proposed by James Lind that the Commissioners of the Admiralty had requested the ship trial.

Dolphin dropped anchor at the peninsula of Tahiti Iti ("small Tahiti", a.k.a. Taiarapu) on 17 June 1767 but quickly left to find a better anchorage. Wallis chose Matavai Bay on 23 June. Although the Spanish had visited the Marquesas Islands in 1595, some 170 years earlier, Wallis officially took possession of Otaheiti, which he named "King George III Island". (About a year later, French navigator Louis-Antoine de Bougainville landed at Hitiaa on the opposite side of Tahiti and unaware of Wallis's earlier visit, claimed it for the King of France.)

Early on, canoes approached Dolphin and at a signal its occupants launched a storm of stones at the British, who replied with grapeshot. Dolphin's gunnery cut the canoe in two, killing most of its occupants. Wallis then sent his carpenters ashore to cut the eighty-some canoes there in half. Eventually, friendly relations were established between the British sailors and the locals, including Queen Purea. The relationships became particularly friendly when the sailors discovered that the women were eager to exchange sex for iron. This trade became so extensive that the loss of nails started to threaten Dolphin's physical integrity.

== See also ==
- European and American voyages of scientific exploration
