= Frances Byron, Baroness Byron =

Frances Byron
- Baroness Byron; Baronetess of Alderston
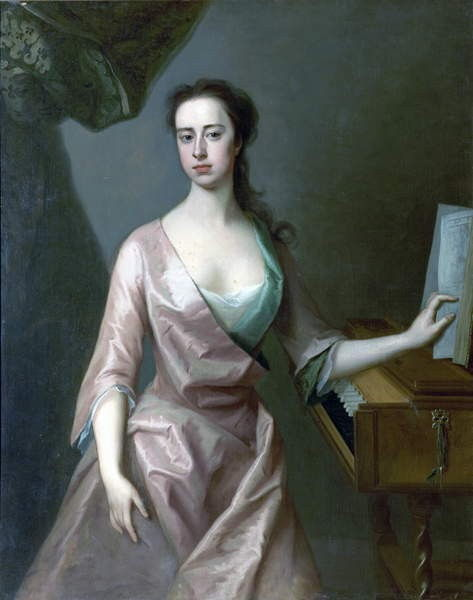
- Frances, painted by Michael Dahl in 1720
- Born: Frances Berkeley; 1703
- Died: 13 September 1757; East Lothian
- Spouse(s): William Byron, 4th Baron Byron; Sir Thomas Hay, 2nd Baronet of Alderston
- Issue: Isabella Byron; William Byron, 5th Baron Byron; John Byron; Reverend Richard Byron; Charles Byron; George Byron
- Father: William Berkeley, 4th Baron Berkeley of Stratton
- Mother: Frances Temple

Frances, Baroness Byron (later Hay; née Berkeley; 1703 – 13 September 1757), was the second daughter of William Berkeley, 4th Baron Berkeley of Stratton (died 1740/1), and his wife Frances Temple (died 1707). She was the third wife of William Byron, 4th Baron Byron and a great-grandmother of the poet Lord Byron.

Lady Byron was one of 21 women of influence who signed Thomas Coram's petition of 1729, which led to the foundation of the Foundling Hospital. She is also known for sitting for the eighteenth-century artist William Hogarth (1697–1764), whose painting has been exhibited at the Foundling Museum, near Brunswick Square in London, as part of their "Ladies of Quality" exhibition.

== Life and marriages ==
Frances was born on 5 April 1703, the second child of four daughters and three sons born to William Berkeley, 4th Baron Berkeley of Stratton and Frances Temple. Her baptism took place on 9 April at St Martin in the Fields, Westminster.

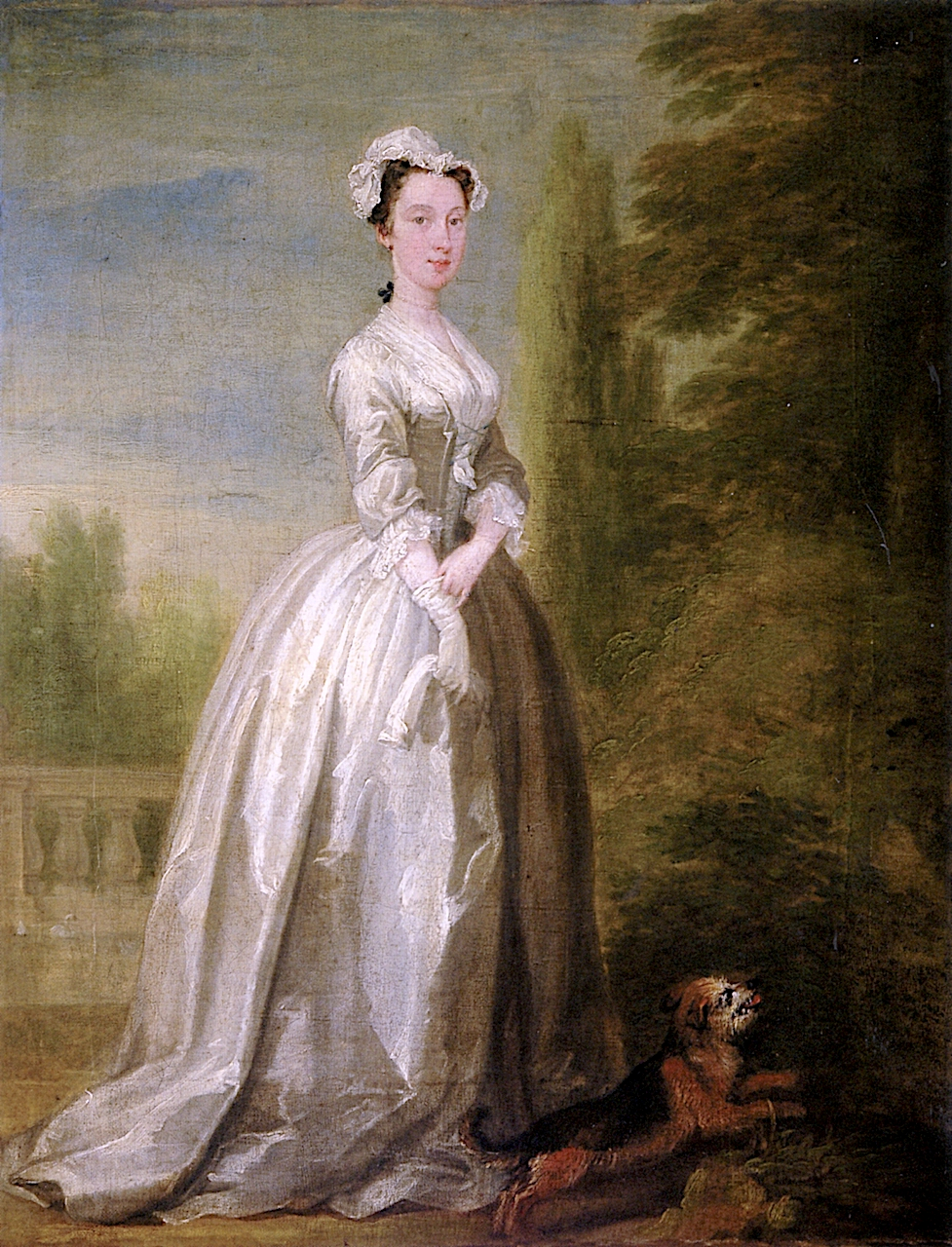
Frances, Lady Byron is identified as Hogarth's sitter in this portrait of 1736. Cannon Hall Museum, Barnsley

On 3 December 1720, Frances Berkeley married William Byron, 4th Baron Byron (1669–1736), as his third wife. It was a financially beneficial match arranged by her father, who wrote on 1 November 1720, "I am going to dispose of one of my daughters to Lord Byron, a disproportionate match as to their ages, but marriages not offering every day, I would not miss this opportunity ... though attended by never so many inconveniences". At their marriage Frances was just 17, and Lord Byron was 51.

During this marriage, Frances had six children:

- Isabella Byron (1721–1795), wife of Henry Howard, 4th Earl of Carlisle
- William Byron, 5th Baron Byron (1722–1798)
- Vice-Admiral John Byron (1723–1786)
- Reverend Richard Byron (1724–1811)
- Charles Byron (1726–1731)
- George Byron (1730–1789)

Frances is identified in John Faber's engraving after a Hogarth portrait of 1736, made before her husband Lord Byron died on 8 August 1736. It was "through her second son John [that Frances was] the great-grandmother of Lord Byron, the poet".

Four years after her first husband's death Frances remarried, to Sir Thomas Hay, Bt. (c.1698 – 1769) of Alderston, as his second wife, in 1740. There were no children from this marriage, and Frances predeceased Sir Thomas.

Frances died, most likely in East Lothian, on 13 September 1757, and was brought for burial at the Berkeley family vault at St Mary's Twickenham on 21 September. In her will she left any property to her husband, making no mention of her children.

== Role in the Foundling Hospital ==
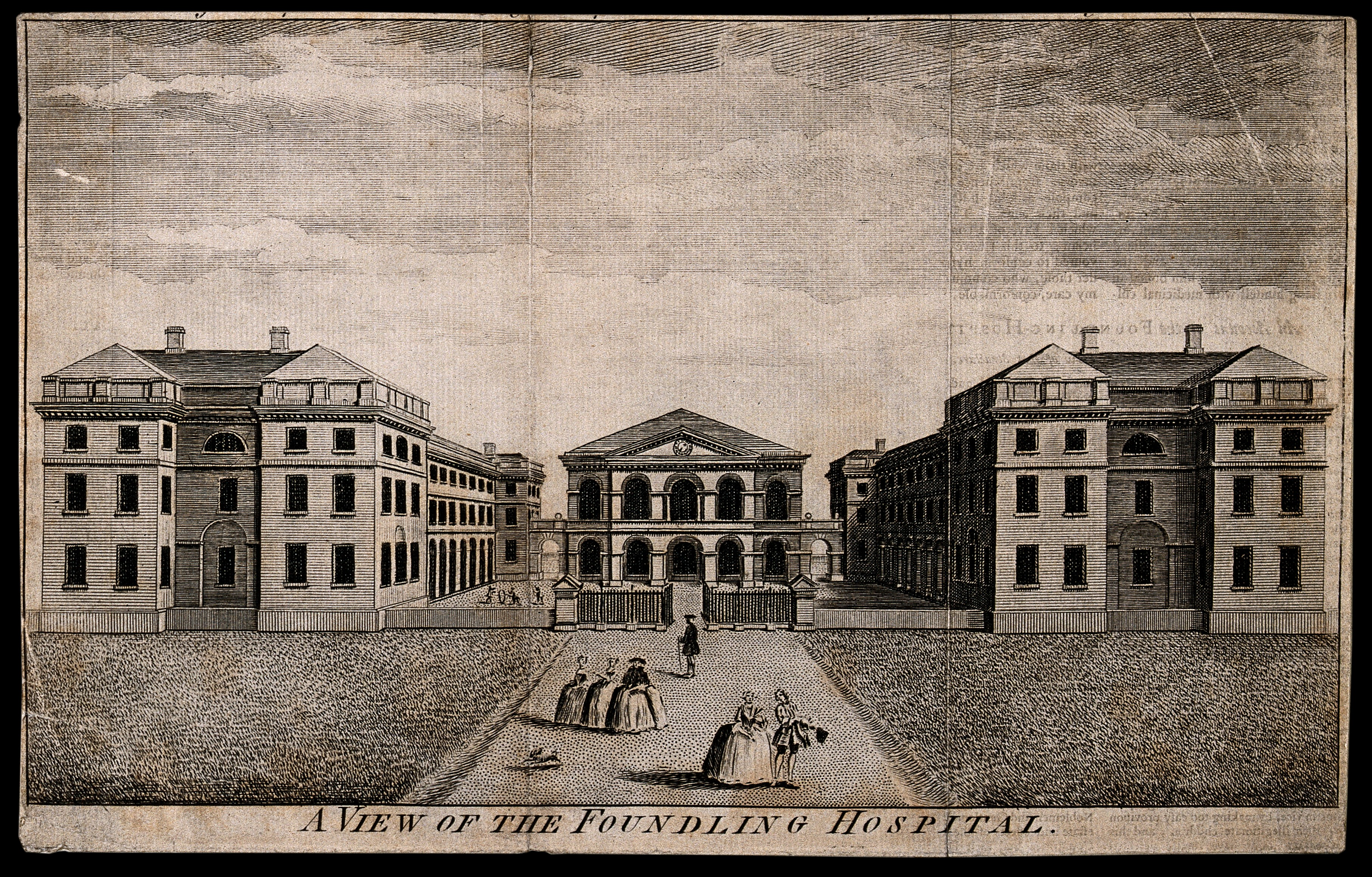
Lady Byron was one of the 21 women who signed the 1730 petition for the Foundling Hospital.

In 1735, Thomas Coram presented his first petition to King George II, aiming to facilitate the building of a Foundling Hospital. Frances, among 21 women of influence, signed this petition. Frances personally signed on 14 April 1730. The support of these women was one of innovative thought and vision, that not only triggered a catalyst for the further two petitions in 1737, that was ultimately successful. A Royal Charter was finally granted in 1739, calling upon 375 male signatories, yet excluding the ladies who were the facilitators of this success.

Frances is thought to have been influenced by her friend, Anne Newport, Baroness Torrington, who signed the petition on the same day. Frances' participation led to the involvement of her son, William Byron, 5th Baron Byron (1722–1798), in the Foundling Hospital in October 1739, who is listed, alongside Hogarth, as a prominent governor. However it is considered that William's role of authority was unsympathetic to the cause, as he is notoriously represented as "the 'wicked Lord', [who] encumbered the estate, sold off much property and the family pictures in the 1770s".

== Identity in Hogarth's painting ==
Although details around the commission for William Hogarth's portrait of Lady Byron remain unclear, Lord Byron is thought to have subscribed to Hogarth's Rake's Progress. Historians can also decipher that the portrait was produced six years after Frances signed Coram's petition for the Foundling Museum. Interestingly, at the same time Hogarth is painting Frances, two further petitions are being organised for presentation, which ultimately receives Royal Charter in 1739.

As noted in William Hogarth: A Complete Catalogue of Paintings, Frances is "shown walking in a park, looking at the viewer with pale grey-blue eyes, pulling on a glove with her left hand". Another feature of the portrait is the depiction of her "black and tan terrier" with an emphasised grey muzzle that is considered to allude to her elderly husband.
