= William Berkeley, 4th Baron Berkeley of Stratton =

British politician and judge

The Right Honourable The Lord Berkeley of Stratton PC PC (I)

Chancellor of the Duchy of Lancaster
- In office 21 September 1710 – 6 November 1714
- Monarchs: Queen Anne; George I
- Preceded by: The Earl of Derby
- Succeeded by: The Earl of Aylesford

First Lord of Trade
- In office September 1714 – 12 May 1715
- Monarch: George I
- Preceded by: The Lord Guilford
- Succeeded by: The Earl of Suffolk

Personal details
- Died: 24 March 1741 Bruton, Somerset
- Spouse: Frances Temple (d. 1707)

William Berkeley, 4th Baron Berkeley of Stratton PC, PC (I) (died 24 March 1741), was a British politician and judge, of the Bruton branch of the Berkeley family. He was Master of the Rolls in Ireland between 1696 and 1731 and also held political office as Chancellor of the Duchy of Lancaster from 1710 to 1714 and as First Lord of Trade from 1714 to 1715.

== Background ==
Berkeley was the third son of John Berkeley, 1st Baron Berkeley of Stratton, by Christiana, daughter of Sir Andrew Riccard. Charles, a naval captain who held the title for two years, and John, an admiral who held the title for 16 years, were his elder brothers. William lived a much longer life. He was born on an unknown date between John's 1663 birth and 23 March 1672 which would have made William a septuagenarian by the time of his death in 1741.

== Political and judicial career ==
In 1696 Berkeley was appointed Master of the Rolls in Ireland and sworn of the Irish Privy Council. The following year he succeeded his elder brother in the barony. In 1710 he was admitted to the English Privy Council and appointed Chancellor of the Duchy of Lancaster. He was made First Lord of Trade in 1714, a post he held until 1715. He remained Master of the Rolls in Ireland during this period and continued in this post until 1731.

== Family ==
Lord Berkeley of Stratton married Frances, daughter of Sir John Temple and Jane Yarner; her sister Jane having married his elder brother. Lord Berkeley and his wife had several children, including the Honourable Frances, who married William Byron, 4th Baron Byron, and was the mother of William Byron, 5th Baron Byron, and of Admiral John Byron. Lady Berkeley of Stratton died in July 1707. Lord Berkeley of Stratton remained a widower until his death at Bruton, Somerset, in March 1741. He was succeeded by his eldest son, John.

== Notes and references ==
Notes

Legal offices
Preceded by Sir William Temple	Master of the Rolls in Ireland; 1696–1731	Succeeded by Thomas Carter
Political offices
Preceded by The Earl of Derby	Chancellor of the Duchy of Lancaster; 1710–1714	Succeeded by The Earl of Aylesford
Preceded by The Lord Guilford	First Lord of Trade; 1714–1715	Succeeded by The Earl of Suffolk
Peerage of England
Preceded by John Berkeley	Baron Berkeley of Stratton; 1697–1741	Succeeded by John Berkeley
