= Francis Eyre =

British lawyer and politician

Francis Eyre (1722–1797) was a British lawyer and politician who sat in the House of Commons between 1774 and 1784.

== Early years ==
Eyre was the only surviving son of Francis Eyre, a shoemaker of Truro, and his wife Elizabeth Pascoe.and was baptized on. 28 June 1722. He was articled to an attorney at Truro in 1737 and qualified in 1744. He moved to London where he dealt with cases relating to trade and plantations and included Benjamin Franklin among his clients. He became part owner of several ships and ran privateers during the Seven Years' War. With the profits, he invested in estates in Gloucester and Dorset at home and overseas in Jamaica. He married Sarah Prescott,

== Political career ==
Eyre was seeking a seat in parliament and in the mid 1760s became involved in a complicated and costly situation at Morpeth. The Carlisle interest was restricting the creation of freemen to protect their control of the borough. The corporation of Morpeth invited Eyre to oppose the Carlisle interest and he instituted legal proceedings at his own expense to address this. At the 1768 general election a compromise was reached, which allowed Eyre to be returned with the Carlisle candidate Peter Beckford. However at the last minute Sir Matthew White Ridley put himself forward and with Beckford was declared elected. After petitioning unsuccessfully, Eyre started to prepare for the next election. At the 1774 general election Carlisle's candidates were declared elected but the returning officer was intimidated by Eyre's supporters and agreed to return Eyre as Member of Parliament instead of Hon. William Byron. On 27 January 1775 Eyre was unseated. Although Byron died in June 1776 Eyre received little encouragement from the corporation and was getting into financial difficulties so he withdrew from the contest. He was involved in litigation regarding his West Indian estates and was forced to sell his Gloucestershire estate at Colesbourne. From 1777 Eyre was a frequent defendant in pleas of debts, and was imprisoned in the Marshalsea prison for debt in 1777 and 1778.

Prior to the general election of 1780 Eyre heard that Charles Anderson Pelham, patron of Great Grimsby was undecided on his candidate, so he rode to Grimsby and obtained Pelham's support. He was returned unopposed as MP for Great Grimsby at the 1780 general election. He did not stand again in 1784.

== Last years ==
Eyre eventually sold all his estates as his fortunes declined. He died on 13 March 1797.

Parliament of Great Britain
Preceded by Peter Beckford; Sir Matthew White Ridley	Member of Parliament for Morpeth; 1774–1775; With: Peter Delmé	Succeeded by Hon. William Byron; Peter Delmé
Preceded by Francis Evelyn Anderson; Joseph Mellish	Member of Parliament for Great Grimsby; 1780–1784; With: John Harrison	Succeeded by John Harrison; Dudley Long
