= The Well-Travelled Goat =

17th-century goat known for traveling with Samuel Walls and James Cook

The Well-Travelled Goat was a goat that accompanied both Samuel Wallis on the Dolphin and James Cook on his first voyage on the Endeavour around the world.

It was amongst several other animals on the Endeavour loaded as livestock. Sheep, pigs, goats, and chickens were on board to provide meat, eggs, and milk.

It was not the only traveller with Cook to have previously travelled on the Dolphin, which also included the ship's master Robert Molyneuax, ship's master's mates Charles Clerke, Richard Pickersgill, and Francis Wilkinson, and the lieutenant John Gore.

It had a Latin poem, a distich, written for it by Samuel Johnson at the request of Joseph Banks, which Banks had engraved upon the goat's collar:

Perpetui, ambita bis terra, premia lactis
Haec habet, altrici Capra secunda Jovis.

— Samuel Johnson

Translated to English this reads "The globe twice circled, this the Goat, the second to the nurse of Jove, is thus rewarded for her never-failing milk."

Johnson's biographer gave a somewhat lengthier and looser translation, attributed to "a friend":

In fame scarce second to the nurse of Jove,
This Goat, who twice the world had traversed round,
Deserving both her master’s care and love,
Ease and perpetual pasture now has found.

— James Boswell, The Life of Samuel Johnson

John Wilson Croker noted in a critical edition of Boswell's biography that "[n]either the original nor the translation will add much to the poetical fame of Mr. Boswell's friends. The Latin seems particularly stiff and poor."

Oskar Spate observed that the goat's fate was more fortunate than that of Amalthea, the aforementioned "nurse of Jove". The goat was much celebrated by newspapers such as the General Evening Post upon the return of the Endeavour, whose correspondent for the voyage claimed that "[s]he never went dry during the whole of the voyage" and asserted that "we mean to reward her services by placing her in a good English pasture for the rest of her life". It lived out the rest of its life as a "pensioner" at Greenwich Hospital and died at Mile End on 28 April 1772.

In 2006 Jackie French wrote a fictionalized account of the voyage for children, based upon the real events, that was partly narrated from the view of the goat, entitled The Goat who Sailed the World.
