= Portrait of the Earl of Carlisle =

Painting by Joshua Reynolds

Portrait of Earl of Carlisle
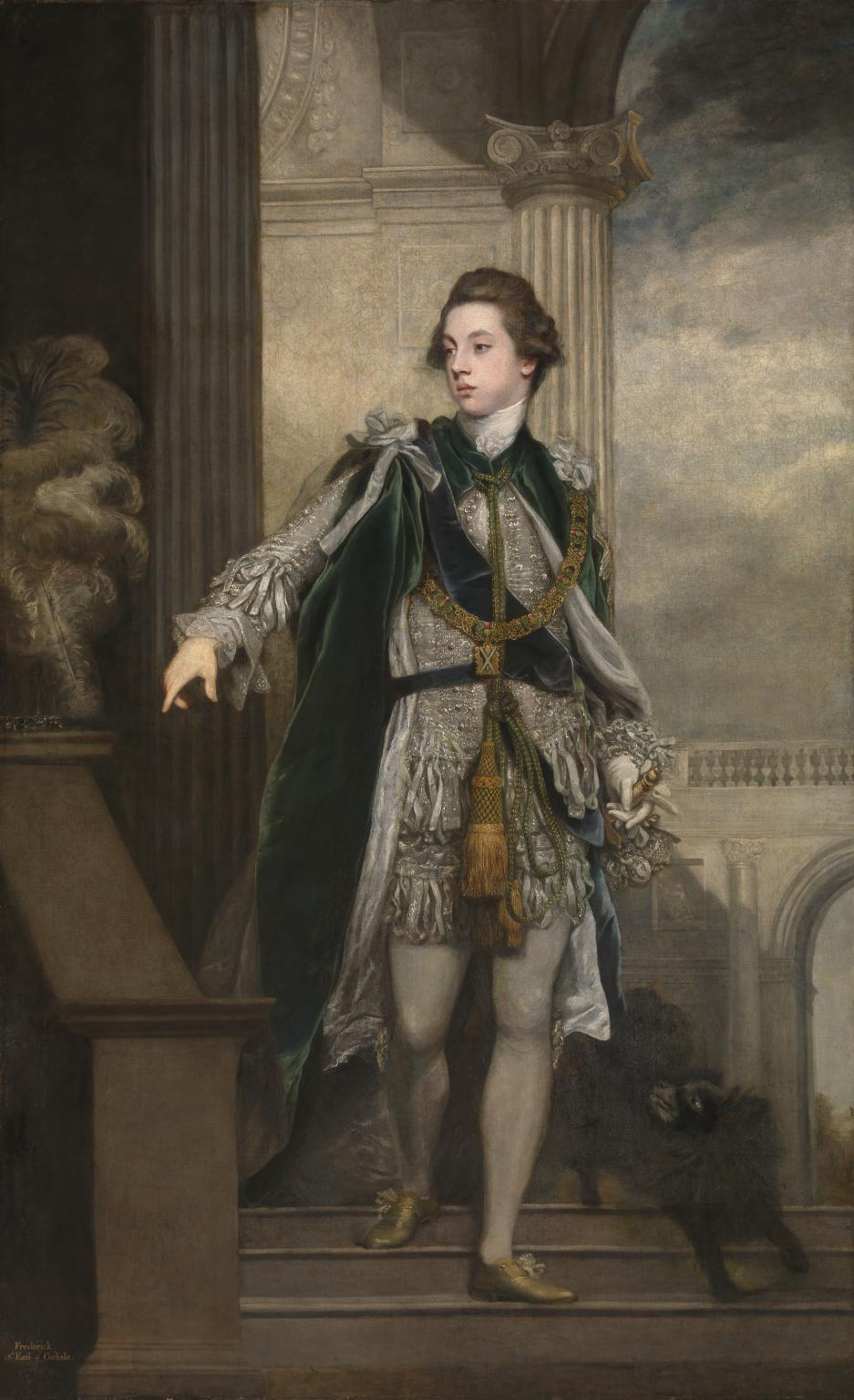
- Artist: Joshua Reynolds
- Year: 1769
- Type: Oil on canvas, portrait painting
- Dimensions: 241 cm × 149.8 cm (95 in × 59.0 in)
- Location: Castle Howard; Yorkshire

Portrait of the Earl of Carlisle is a 1769 portrait painting by the English artist Joshua Reynolds. It depicts the British aristocrat Frederick Howard, 5th Earl of Carlisle. Produced when the Earl was in his early twenties, it is a swagger portrait featured him dressed in the ceremonial robes of the Order of the Thistle. Carlisle had inherited the title as a boy in 1758, and later entered politics. He would go on to head the Carlisle Commission, an attempt to end the American War of Independence which was undermined by the entry of France into the conflict. Subsequently he was appointed as Lord Lieutenant of Ireland. He became a friend of Reynolds, the President of the Royal Academy.

The painting has been at Carlisle's family residence Castle Howard in Yorkshire for centuries. In 2016, it was acquired by the National Trust for acceptance in lieu of tax of £4.7 million by H M Government (the way the scheme is structured meant the open market price calculation of the picture would be substantially higher than £4.7million.) It was formally allocated to the Tate Britain, but would remain on display at Castle Howard.

== Bibliography ==
- McIntyre, Ian. Joshua Reynolds: The Life and Times of the First President of the Royal Academy. Allen Lane, 2003.
- Shawe-Taylor, Desmond. The Georgians: Eighteenth-century Portraiture & Society. Barrie & Jenkins, 1990.
