= James St Clair-Erskine, 2nd Earl of Rosslyn =

British Army officer and politician (1762–1837)

General The Right Honourable The Earl of Rosslyn GCB PC
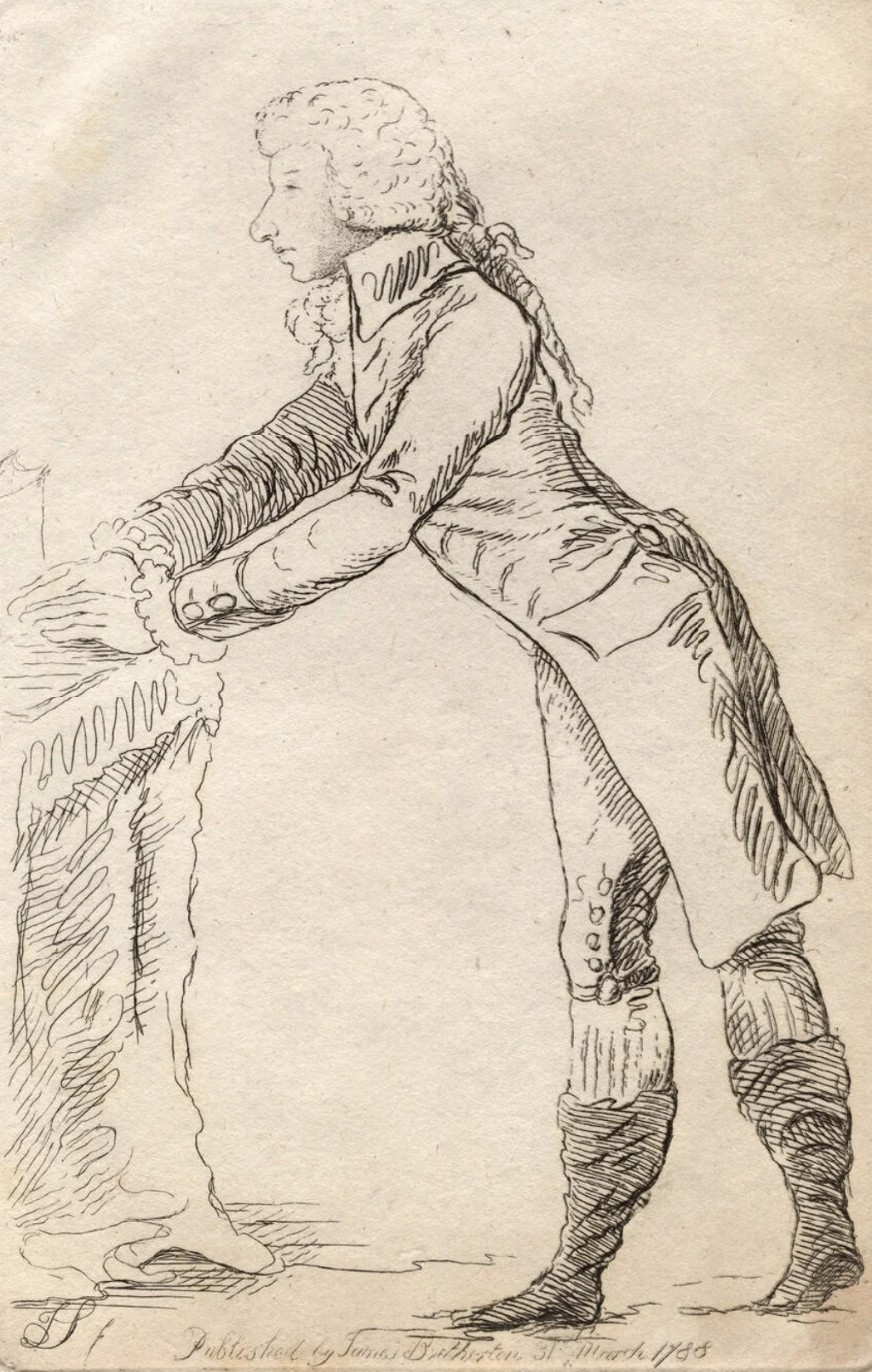
- Portrait by James Sayers, 1788

Lord Keeper of the Privy Seal
- In office 10 June 1829 – 15 November 1830
- Monarchs: George IV; William IV
- Prime Minister: The Duke of Wellington
- Preceded by: The Earl of Ellenborough
- Succeeded by: The Earl of Durham

Lord President of the Council
- In office 15 December 1834 – 8 April 1835
- Monarch: William IV
- Prime Minister: Sir Robert Peel, Bt
- Preceded by: The Marquess of Lansdowne
- Succeeded by: The Marquess of Lansdowne

Member of the House of Lords Lord Temporal
- In office 2 January 1805 – 18 January 1837; Hereditary Peerage
- Preceded by: The 1st Earl of Rosslyn
- Succeeded by: The 3rd Earl of Rosslyn

Personal details
- Born: 6 February 1762
- Died: 18 January 1837 (aged 74)
- Party: Whig; Tory
- Spouse: Harriet Bouverie (m. 1790; died 1810)
- Children: James St Clair-Erskine, 3rd Earl of Rosslyn
- Parent(s): Sir Henry Erskine, 5th Baronet; Janet Wedderburn
- Relatives: Alexander Wedderburn, 1st Earl of Rosslyn (uncle)

General James St Clair-Erskine, 2nd Earl of Rosslyn, GCB, PC (6 February 1762 – 18 January 1837) was a British Army officer and politician who served as Lord President of the Council from 1834 to 1835.

== Background and education ==
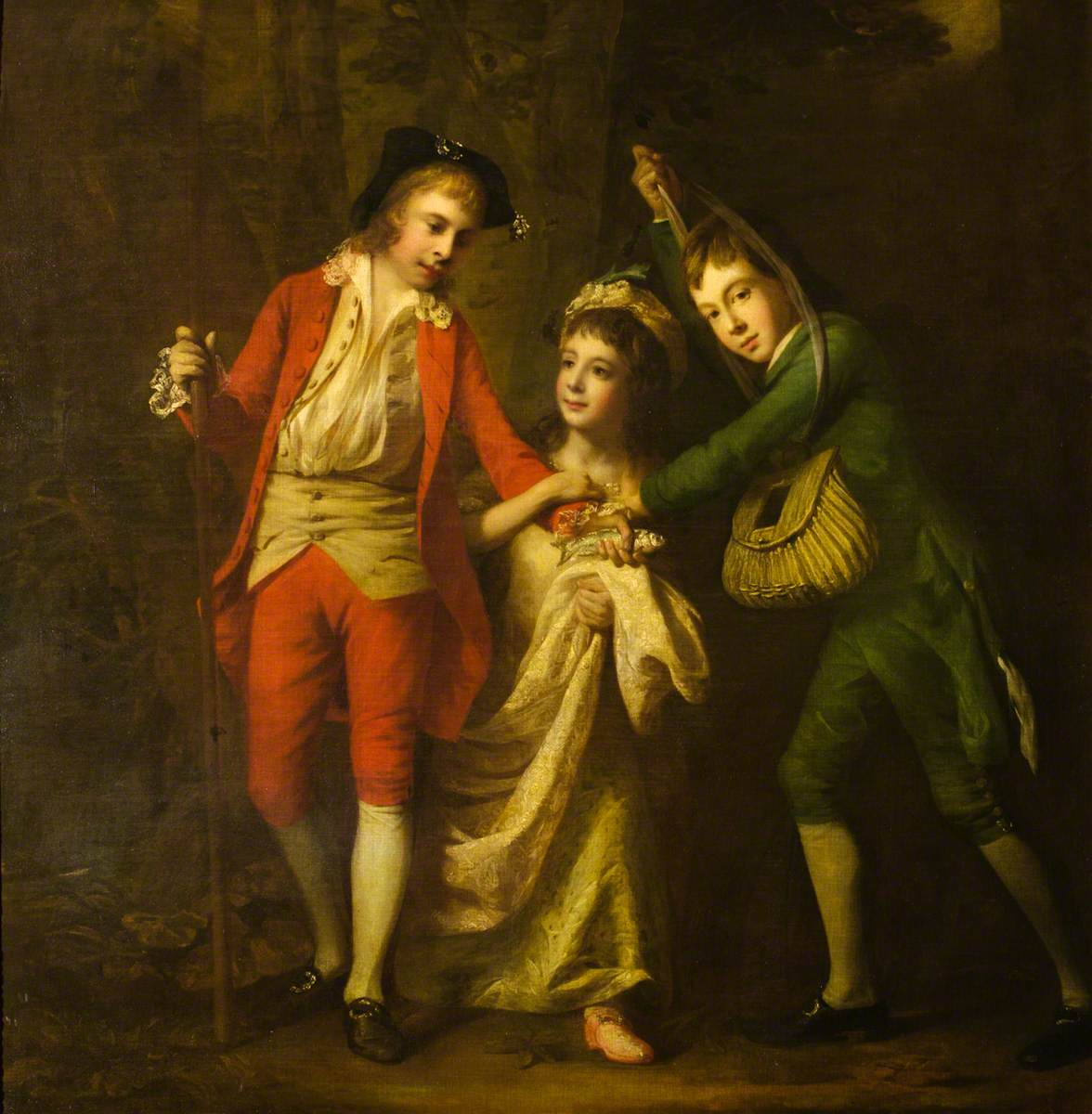
Portrait of James Sinclair-Erskine, later 2nd Earl of Rosslyn, his brother John and his sister Henrietta Maria, painted by Nathaniel (I) Hone.

Erskine was the son of Lieutenant-General Sir Henry Erskine, 5th Baronet, and Janet, daughter of Peter Wedderburn (a Lord of Session under the judicial title of Lord Chesterhall) and sister of Alexander Wedderburn, 1st Earl of Rosslyn. Lord Rosslyn's earldom had been created with special remainder to his nephew, Erskine. Erskine succeeded as sixth baronet in 1765, at the age of three, on the death of his father. He was educated at Edinburgh High School and Eton, and was commissioned in the 21st Light Dragoons in 1778.

== Military career ==
Erskine was assistant Adjutant-General in Ireland in 1782. In 1793, he became Adjutant-General, in which capacity he served at the Siege of Toulon and Corsica. In 1795, he was promoted to colonel and appointed Aide-de-Camp to King George III. He became a major-general in 1798, lieutenant-general in 1805, and general in 1814. In 1806, he was a member of the special mission to Lisbon, which resulted in Sir Arthur Wellesley (later the Duke of Wellington) being sent to the Peninsular. He also saw action in Denmark

As a result of the Slave Compensation Act 1837, Erskine received a £3,626 payment from the British government, as he was a trustee for the Lower Walrond and Upper Walrond slave plantations in Antigua owned by his son-in-law Bethell Walrond.

== Political career ==
Erskine was a member of the House of Commons for the English pocket boroughs of Castle Rising between 1782 and 1784 and Morpeth between 1784 and 1796. Initially a Whig, an adherent of Edmund Burke and an active supporter of Charles James Fox against William Pitt the Younger in the debates over the East India Company, he was one of the managers of the Impeachment of Warren Hastings. In 1789, on inheriting the Rosslyn and Dysart estates from his cousin James Paterson St Clair, he adopted the name St Clair before his own surname. In 1796, he was elected for the Dysart Burghs in Fife, a constituency traditionally under the St Clair influence.

In January 1805, Erksine succeeded his uncle as Earl of Rosslyn, being by this time considered a Tory. On 5 February 1807, during a debate in the House of Lords over the proposed Slave Trade Act 1807, Rosslyn spoke in support of the act and claimed that abolishing the slave trade would improve the treatment of slaves in British colonies. After the end of the Napoleonic Wars he continued to sit in the House of Lords. Rosslyn was a member of the cabinet as Lord Privy Seal from 1829 to 1830 under the Duke of Wellington's and Lord President of the Council under Sir Robert Peel from 1834 to 1835. In 1829, he was sworn of the Privy Council.

== Family ==
Lord Rosslyn married Harriet Elizabeth, daughter of the Hon. Edward Bouverie, in 1790. She died in August 1810. Rosslyn remained a widower until his death in January 1837, aged 74. He was succeeded by his son, James.

Parliament of Great Britain
Preceded by Robert Mackreth; John Chetwynd-Talbot	Member of Parliament for Castle Rising; 1782–1784; With: Robert Mackreth	Succeeded by Charles Boone; Walter Sneyd
Preceded by Peter Delmé; Anthony Morris Storer	Member of Parliament for Morpeth; 1784–1796; With: Peter Delmé 1784–89; Francis Gregg 1790–95; Viscount Morpeth 1795–96	Succeeded by Viscount Morpeth; William Huskisson
Preceded by Charles Hope	Member of Parliament for Dysart Burghs; 1796–1801	Succeeded by Parliament of the United Kingdom
Parliament of the United Kingdom
Preceded by Parliament of Great Britain	Member of Parliament for Dysart Burghs; 1801–1805	Succeeded by Robert Dallas
Political offices
Preceded by The Lord Ellenborough	Lord Privy Seal; 1829–1830	Succeeded by The Lord Durham
Preceded by The Marquess of Lansdowne	Lord President of the Council; 1834–1835	Succeeded by The Marquess of Lansdowne
Honorary titles
Preceded by The Earl of Kellie	Lord Lieutenant of Fife; 1828–1837	Succeeded by Robert Ferguson
Masonic offices
Preceded by William Maule	Acting Grand Master of the Grand Lodge of Scotland; 1810–1812	Succeeded by The Viscount Duncan of Camperdown
Peerage of the United Kingdom
Preceded by Alexander Wedderburn	Earl of Rosslyn; 1805–1837	Succeeded by James Alexander St Clair-Erskine
Baronetage of Nova Scotia
Preceded by Henry Erskine	Baronet (of Alva); 1765–1837	Succeeded by James Alexander St Clair-Erskine
