= William Byron (MP) =

Hon. William Byron (27 October 1749 – 22 June 1776) was a British politician who sat in the House of Commons from 1775 to 1776.

Byron was the son of William Byron, 5th Baron Byron, and his wife Elizabeth Shaw, daughter of Charles Shaw of Besthorpe Hall, Norfolk, and was born on 27 October 1749 and baptised at St James's Church, Piccadilly on 31 October 1749. He was educated at Eton College from 1763 to 1766. In 1768 he was in France running up bills on his father's account. His father was in serious financial difficulties which he hoped to resolve by obtaining a wealthy bride for William. However William eloped to Gretna Green with his cousin Juliana Elizabeth Byron, daughter of Admiral John Byron.

Byron contested Morpeth at the 1774 general election on the Carlisle interest. He was defeated, but seated as Member of Parliament on petition on 28 January 1775. There is no record of any vote or speech by him in the eighteen months he was in Parliament.

Byron as heir was due to inherit the Barony, but he died on 22 June 1776. His son was killed by cannon fire in 1794 while fighting in Corsica and the barony ultimately went to the poet Lord Byron.

== Sources ==
Parliament of Great Britain
Preceded by Francis Eyre; Peter Delmé	Member of Parliament for Morpeth; 1775–1776; With: Peter Delmé	Succeeded by Gilbert Elliot; Peter Delmé
