= Peter Delmé (MP for Morpeth) =

English Member of Parliament

Peter Delmé (19 December 1748 – 1789) was an English member of parliament for the constituency of Morpeth in 1774–84.

Delmé's grandfather was a wealthy London banking figure, Sir Peter Delmé, while his father, also called Peter, served as MP for Ludgershall from 1734 to 1741, and for Southampton from 1741 to 1754.

He was the first husband of Elizabeth Howard (1746–1813). They married on 16 Feb 1769.

Parliament of Great Britain
Preceded by Peter Beckford; Sir Matthew White Ridley	Member of Parliament for Morpeth; 1774–1790; With: Francis Eyre 1774-1775; Hon. William Byron 1775-1776; Gilbert Elliot 1776-1777; John William Egerton 1777-1780; Anthony Morris Storer 1780-1784; Major Sir James Erskine 1784-1790	Succeeded by Major Sir James Erskine; Francis Gregg
