= William Byron, 4th Baron Byron =

British Baron (1669–1736)

William Byron, Lord Byron
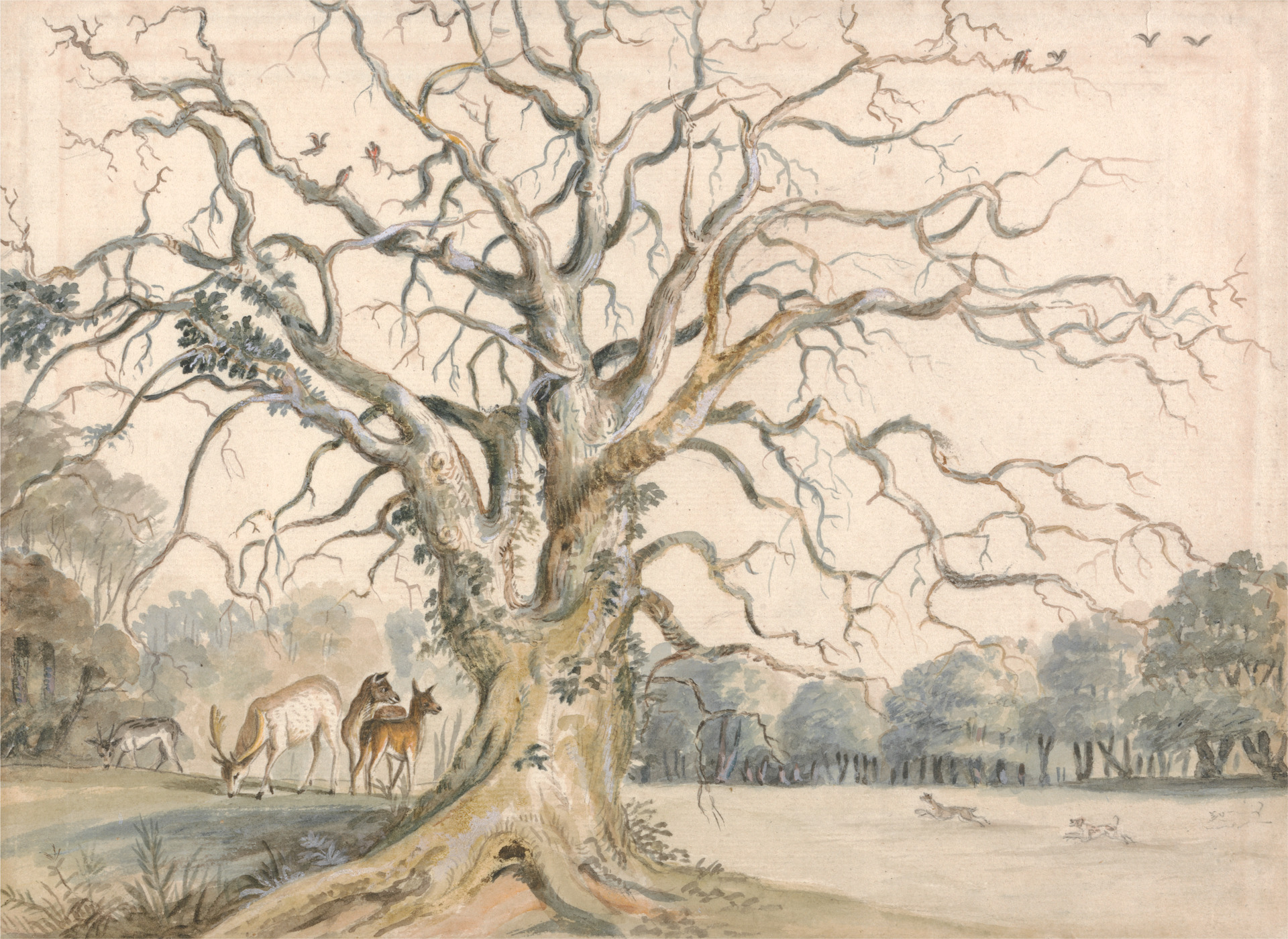
- View of a Park with Deer, William Byron, 4th Baron Byron, Yale Center for British Art.

Member of the House of Lords Lord Temporal
- In office 13 November 1695 – 8 August 1736; Hereditary peerage
- Preceded by: William Byron, 3rd Baron Byron
- Succeeded by: William Byron, 5th Baron Byron

Personal details
- Born: 4 January 1669/70 Newstead, Nottinghamshire
- Died: 8 August 1736 (aged 66) Newstead, Nottinghamshire
- Spouse(s): Lady Mary Egerton; Lady Frances Wilhelmina Bentinck; Hon. Frances Berkeley
- Children: Hon. George Byron; Hon. William Byron; Hon. William Henry Byron; Hon. Isabella Byron, Countess of Carlisle; William Byron, 5th Baron Byron; Hon. John Byron; Hon. Rev. Richard Byron; Hon. George Byron
- Parents: William Byron, 3rd Baron Byron (father); Hon. Elizabeth Chaworth (mother)

William Byron, 4th Baron Byron (4 January 1669/70 – 8 August 1736) was an English nobleman, politician, peer, and Gentleman of the Bedchamber to Prince George of Denmark.

== Early life ==
Byron was the only surviving son of William Byron, 3rd Baron Byron and Elizabeth Chaworth. He succeeded to the title of 4th Baron Byron in 1695 upon the death of his father.

He held the family seat of Newstead Abbey and had a townhouse at 15 Great Marlborough Street in central London; he leased it from 1709 and it remained in the family until 1774.

== Marriages and children ==
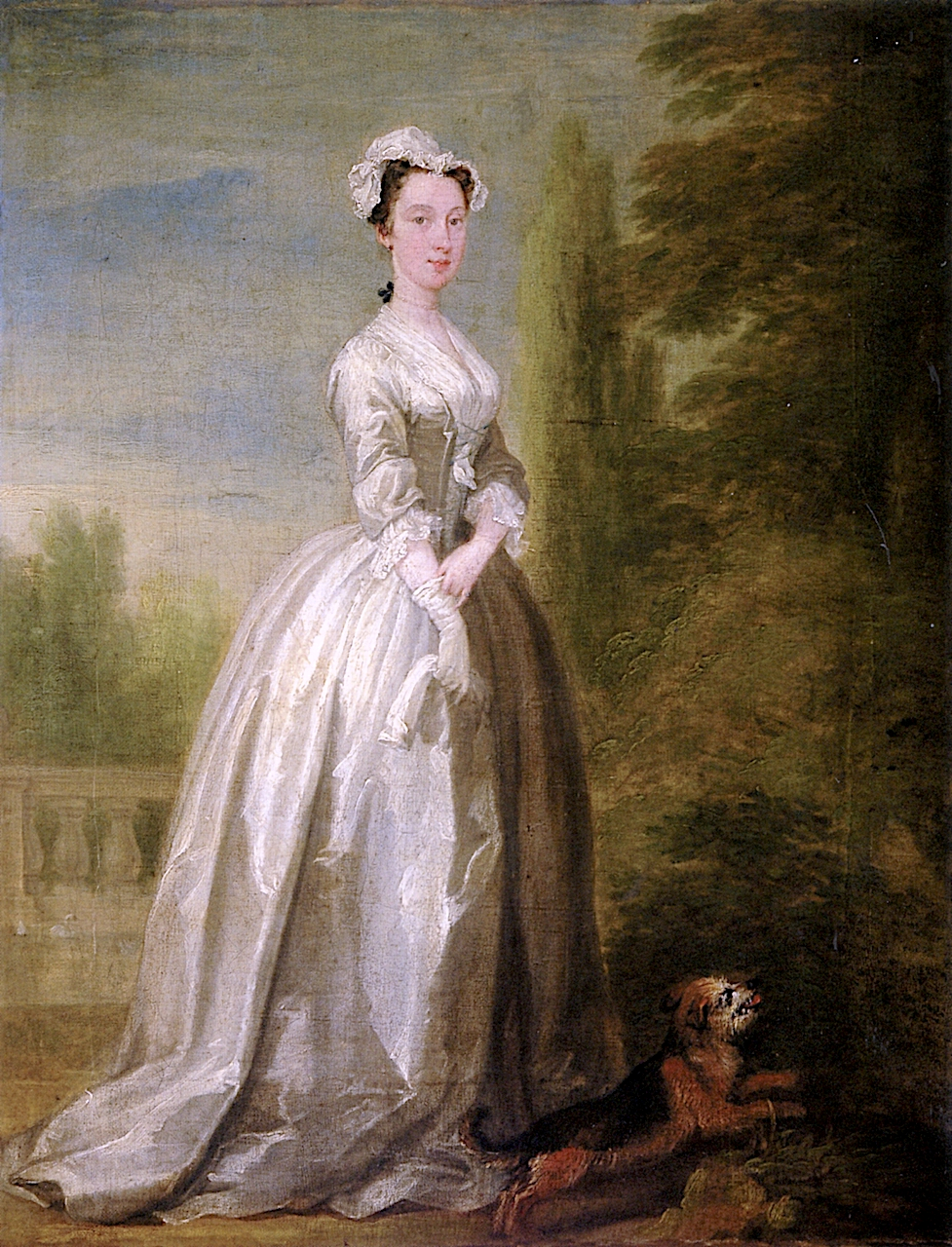
Frances, Lady Byron, by William Hogarth (1736)

Lord Byron firstly married Lady Mary Egerton, daughter of John Egerton, 3rd Earl of Bridgewater and Lady Jane Powlett, in 1702/3, but they had no children.

Secondly, he married Lady Frances Wilhelmina Bentinck, daughter of Hans William Bentinck, 1st Earl of Portland and Anne Villiers, in 1706. All four of their children died in childhood or infancy:

- George Byron (1707–1719)
- William Byron (1709–1709)
- William Henry Byron (1710–1710)
- Frances Byron (1711–1724)

Frances Wilhelmina died on 31 March 1712.

He married thirdly Frances Berkeley, daughter of William Berkeley, 4th Baron Berkeley of Stratton, and Frances Temple, in 1720. They had six children:

- Isabella Byron (1721–1795), wife of Henry Howard, 4th Earl of Carlisle
- William Byron, 5th Baron Byron (1722–1798)
- Vice-Admiral John Byron (1723–1786)
- Reverend Richard Byron (1724–1811)
- Charles Byron (1726–1731)
- George Byron (1730–1789)

== Death ==
Lord Byron died at Newstead Abbey on 8 August 1736, and was succeeded by his fourth (but oldest surviving) son William Byron, 5th Baron Byron.

His widow Frances remarried Sir Thomas Hay, Bart., of Alderston in 1741 and was buried on 21 September 1757 in Twickenham, Middlesex.

== Citations ==
Peerage of England
Preceded by William Byron	Baron Byron; 1695–1736	Succeeded by William Byron
