= Henry Howard, 4th Earl of Carlisle =

British Whig politician

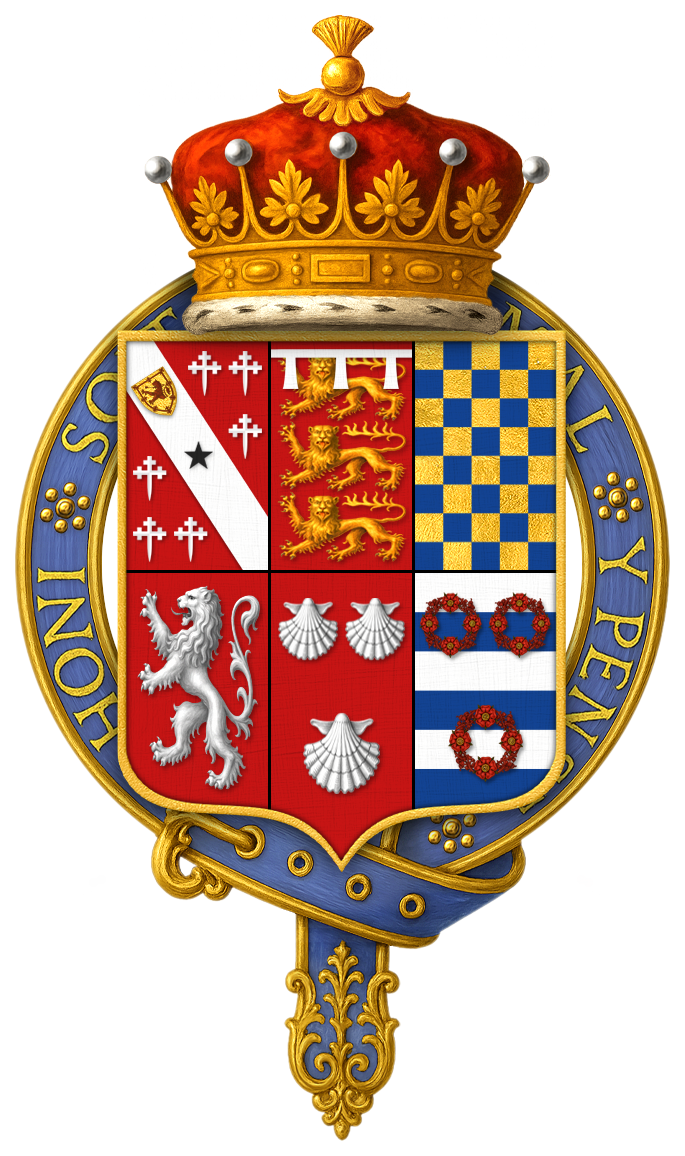
Quartered coat of arms of Henry Howard, 4th Earl of Carlisle, KG

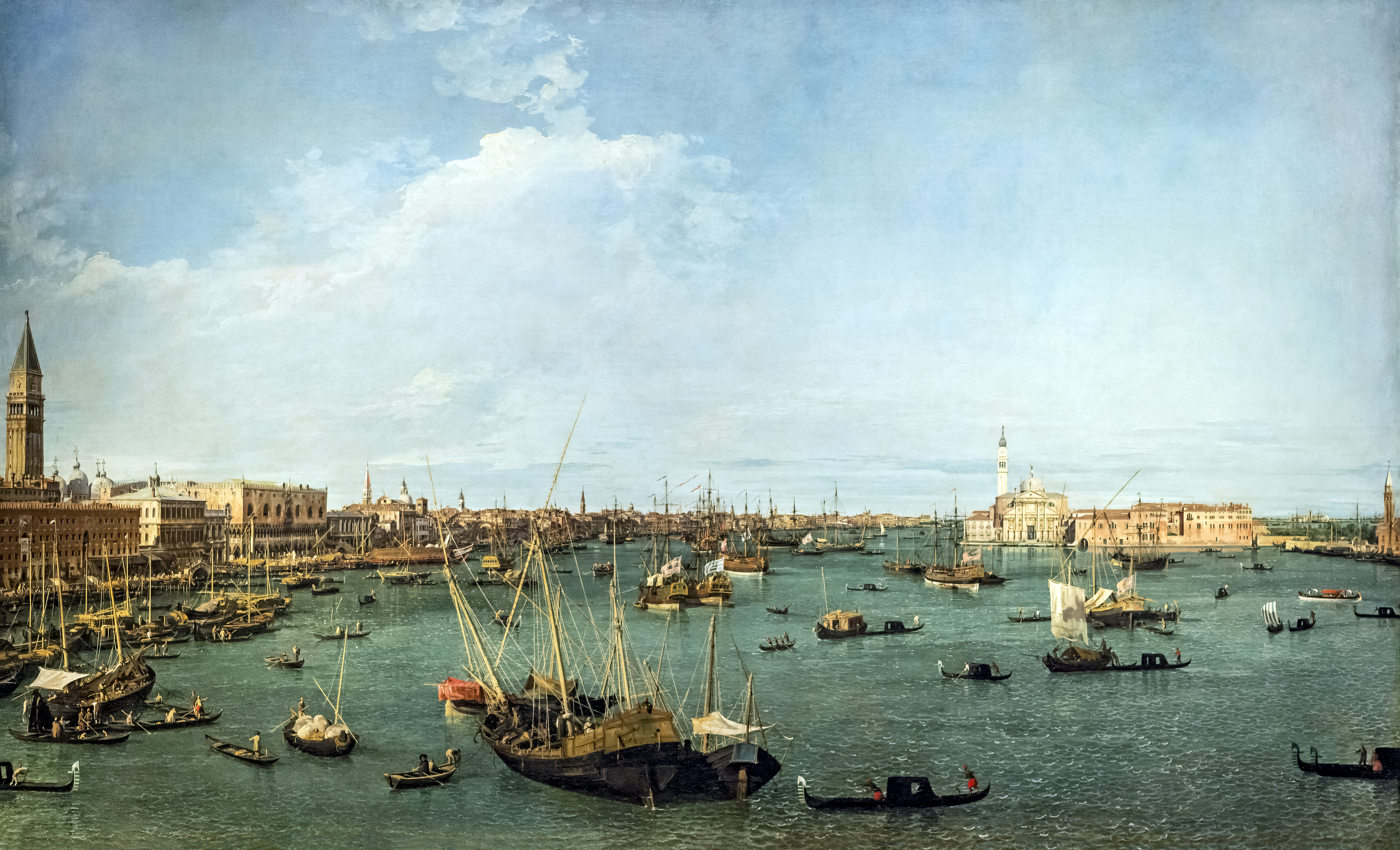
Giovanni Antonio Canal; Bacino di San Marco, Venice; Museum of Fine Arts, Boston; ca. 1738

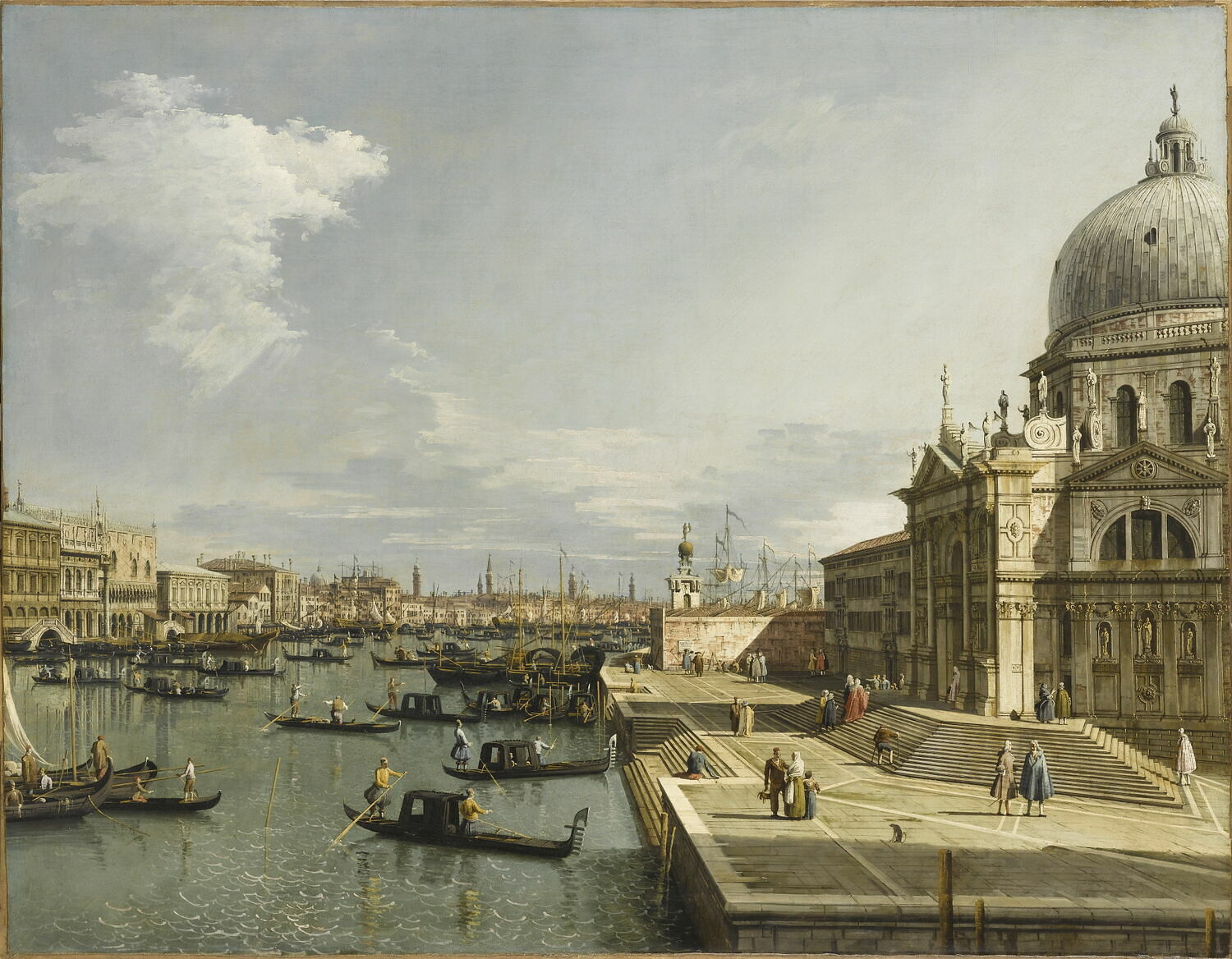
school of Bernardo Bellotto, formerly attributed to Giovanni Antonio Canal; Entrance to the Grand Canal and the Church of La Salute; 1725–1750; Louvre

Henry Howard, 4th Earl of Carlisle KG (14 August 1694 – 3 September 1758), styled Viscount Morpeth until 1738 was a British Whig politician who sat in the House of Commons from 1715 to 1738 when he succeeded to the Peerage as Earl of Carlisle.

== Early life ==
Carlisle was the third but eldest surviving son of Charles Howard, 3rd Earl of Carlisle, and his wife Lady Anne, daughter of Arthur Capell, 1st Earl of Essex. He was educated at Eton and Trinity College, Cambridge.

== Political career ==
Carlisle was elected Member of Parliament for Morpeth in 1715, a seat he held until 1738 when he succeeded his father in the earldom and entered the House of Lords. In 1756, he was made a Knight of the Garter. He continued building Castle Howard commenced by his father to the designs of his brother-in-law, Sir Thomas Robinson.

== Marriages and issue ==
Lord Carlisle married firstly Lady Frances, daughter of Charles Spencer, 3rd Earl of Sunderland, in 1717. Lady Frances died in 1742. He had three sons and two daughters by his first marriage:

- Charles Howard, Viscount Morpeth (1719–1741)
- Henry Howard, died young
- Robert Howard, Viscount Morpeth (1724–1743)
- Lady Arabella Howard (d. 1746), married on 14 September 1741 Jonathan Cope, eldest son of Sir Jonathan Cope, 1st Baronet, parents of Charles Cope 2nd Baronet
- Lady Diana Howard (29 February 1723 - 6 March 1770), married Thomas Duncombe.

Lord Carlisle married secondly Isabella Byron, daughter of William Byron, 4th Baron Byron, in 1743. She was a grand-aunt of Lord Byron. He had four daughters and one son by his second marriage.

- Lady Anne Howard (1744 – 13 October 1799)
- Lady Frances Howard (1745 – 27 April 1808), married John Radcliffe
- Lady Elizabeth Howard (1747 – June 1813), married Peter Delmé, then Capt. Charles Garnier
- Frederick Howard, 5th Earl of Carlisle (1748–1825)
- Lady Juliana Howard (6 July 1750 – 22 January 1849)

Carlisle died in September 1758. He was succeeded in his titles by his eldest son from his second marriage, Frederick. His widow Lady Carlisle married as her second husband, Sir William Musgrave, 6th Baronet, in 1759 and died in 1795, aged 73.

A group of forty Venetian views by Giovanni Antonio Canal, Bernardo Bellotto, Michele Marieschi and others were commissioned or bought after his second Italian visit 1738—1739 through Antonio Maria Zanetti the Elder.

Parliament of Great Britain
Preceded by Sir John Germain; Oley Douglas	Member of Parliament for Morpeth; 1715–1738; With: The Viscount Castlecomer 1715–1717; George Carpenter 1717–1727; Thomas Robinson 1727–1734; Sir Henry Liddell 1734–1738	Succeeded by Sir Henry Liddell; Henry Furnese
Peerage of England
Preceded by Charles Howard	Earl of Carlisle; 1738–1758	Succeeded by Frederick Howard
