= John Byron =

Royal Navy officer, explorer, and colonial administrator

Vice-Admiral of the White The Honourable John Byron
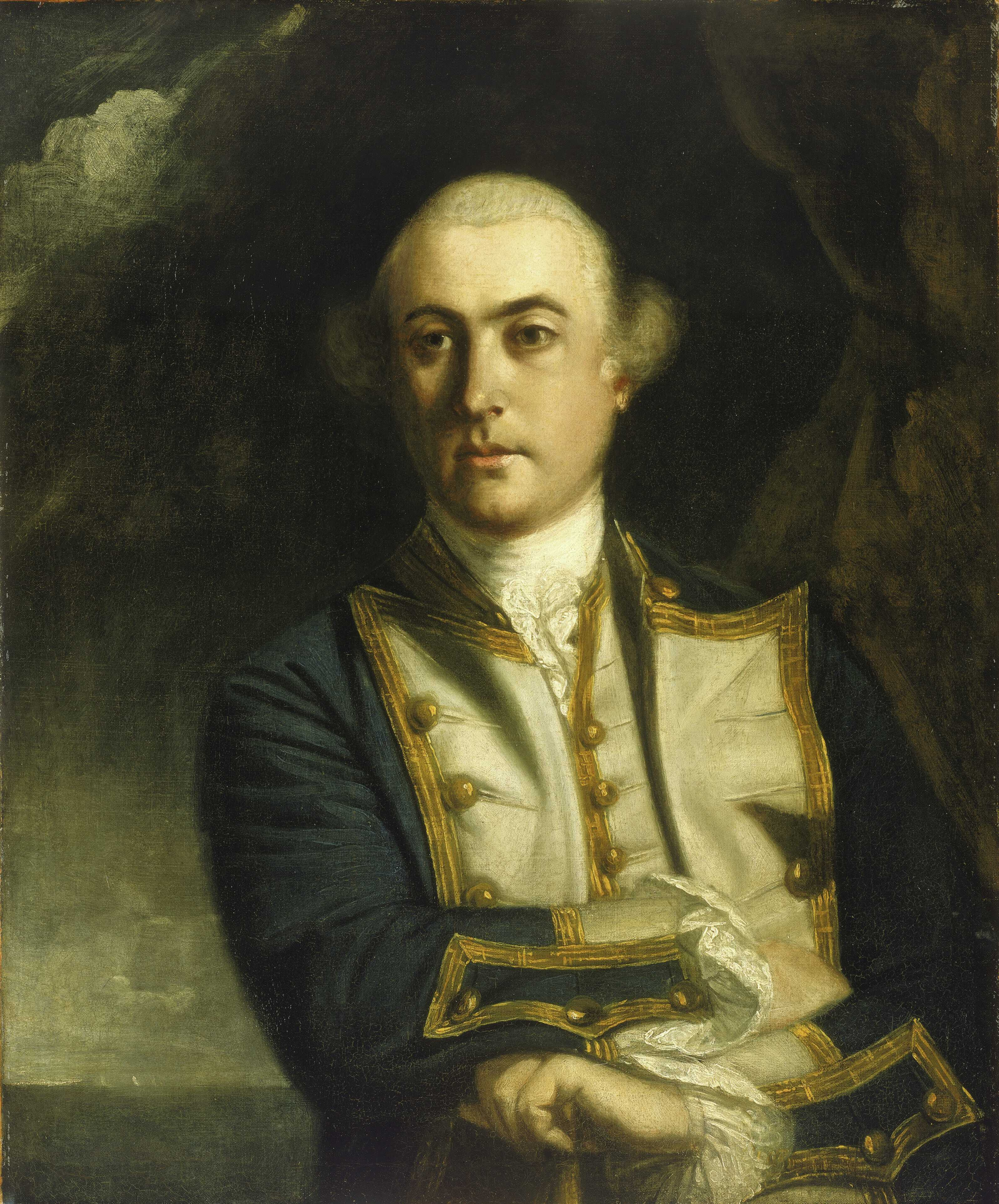
- Portrait by Sir Joshua Reynolds, 1759
- Born: 8 November 1723
- Died: 10 April 1786 (aged 62); London, England
- Burial place: Church of St Mary the Virgin, Twickenham
- Spouse: Sophia Trevanion (m. 1748)
- Children: 9 (incl. John)
- Military career
- Allegiance: Great Britain
- Branch: Royal Navy
- Service years: 1731–1786
- Rank: Vice-Admiral of the White
- Commands: HMS Siren; HMS Dolphin; Leeward Islands Station
- Conflicts: Seven Years' War; Battle of Restigouche; American War of Independence; Battle of Grenada

Viceregal styles of John Byron
- Reference style: His Excellency
- Spoken style: Your Excellency

Vice-Admiral of the White John Byron (8 November 1723 – 1 April 1786) was a Royal Navy officer, explorer, and colonial administrator. He earned the nickname "Foul-Weather Jack" in the British press due to his frequent encounters with bad weather at sea. As a midshipman, Byron sailed in a squadron under George Anson on his voyage around the world. However, Byron's ship, HMS Wager, made it only to southern Chile, where it was wrecked. He returned to England with the captain of the ship.

Byron was appointed governor of Newfoundland following Hugh Palliser, who left in 1768. He circumnavigated the world as a commodore with his own squadron in 1764–1766. Byron fought in several battles of the Seven Years' War and the American War of Independence, and rose to vice admiral before he died in 1786. His grandsons include the poet Lord Byron and the admiral and explorer George Byron, 7th Baron Byron. One of Byron's great-granddaughters was the mathematician and pioneer in informatics Ada Lovelace.

== Early career ==
Byron was the second son of William Byron, 4th Baron Byron and Frances Berkeley, the daughter of William, 4th Baron Berkeley. After studying at Westminster School, he joined the Royal Navy at the age of 14, making his first voyage aboard HMS Romney in 1738–40.

== Anson's voyage around the world ==
In 1740, he accompanied George Anson on his voyage around the world as a midshipman aboard one of the several ships in the squadron.

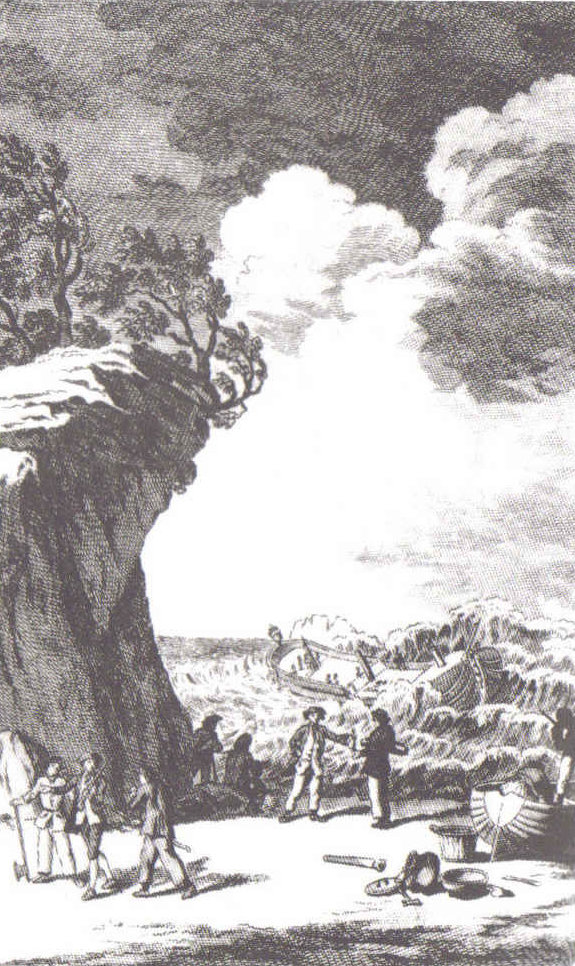
Wreck of the Wager

On 14 May 1741, HMS Wager was shipwrecked on the coast of Chile on what is now called Wager Island, and Byron was one of the survivors. Under the tenuous command of Captain David Cheape, who was only promoted to the position mid-voyage following the death of his predecessor, the survivors bickered amongst themselves and split into factions. A large group of sailors, including Byron, eventually defied Cheape's authority and sailed east to Portuguese Brazil, targeting Rio Grande do Sul on the Atlantic coast. Days into the journey, Byron and several others returned to the captain and his remaining small party.

Cheape's party consisted of 19 men after the deserters rejoined the camp. This included the surgeon Elliot and Lieutenant Hamilton, as well as Byron and fellow midshipman Alexander Campbell. They rowed up the coast but were punished by continuous rain, headwinds, and waves that threatened the boats. One night, while the men slept on shore, one of the boats capsized while at anchor and was swept out to sea with its two boatkeepers. One of the men got ashore, but the other drowned. As it was now impossible for them all to fit in the remaining boat, four marines were left ashore with muskets to fend for themselves. The winds prevented them from getting around the headland, so they returned to pick up the marines, only to find them gone. They returned to Wager Island in early February 1742. With one death on the journey, there were now 13 in the group.

Martín Olleta, a Chono chieftain, guided the men up the coast to the Spanish settlements on Chiloé Island, where they set out again. Two men died; after burying the bodies, the six seamen rowed off in the boat, never to be seen again, while Cheape, Hamilton, Byron, Campbell, and the dying Elliot were on shore looking for food. Olleta then agreed to take the remaining four on by canoe for their only remaining possession, a musket. The party likely travelled across Presidente Ríos Lake in the inland Taitao Peninsula, a lake that Chile officially discovered in 1945. Eventually they made it to be taken prisoner by the Spanish. The Spaniards treated them well and they were eventually taken to the inland capital of Santiago where they were released on parole. The Spaniards heard that Anson had been generous in the treatment of the prisoners he had taken, and this kindness was returned.

Byron and the other three men stayed in Santiago till late 1744 and were offered passage on a French ship bound for Spain. Three accepted the passage. Campbell elected to take a mule across the Andes and joined the Spanish Admiral Pizarro in Montevideo on the Asia only to find Isaac Morris and the two seamen who had been abandoned in Freshwater Bay on the Atlantic coast. After time in prison in Spain, Campbell reached Britain in May 1746, followed by the other three two months later.

In England, the official court martial examined only the loss of the Wager, in which Baynes, in nominal charge at the time, was acquitted of blame but reprimanded for omissions of duty. Disputes over what happened after the wreck were instead played out as Bulkeley and Cummins, Campbell, Morris, the cooper Young, and later Byron published their own accounts, the last of which was the only one that in any way defended Cheap, who had since died. Twenty-nine crew members plus seven marines made it back to England.

Byron's account of his adventures and the Wager Mutiny are recounted in The Narrative of the Honourable John Byron (1768). His book sold well enough to be printed in several editions.

Byron was appointed captain of HMS Siren in December 1746.

== Seven Years' War ==
In 1760, during the Seven Years' War, Byron commanded a squadron sent to destroy the fortifications at Louisbourg, Cape Breton Island, Nova Scotia, which had been captured by the British two years before. They wanted to ensure the French could not use it in Canada. In July of that year, he defeated the French flotilla sent to relieve New France at the Battle of Restigouche.

== Commodore, governor, and vice admiral ==
In early 1764, the British Admiralty determined that a permanent naval settlement off the South American coast would be required to resupply naval vessels seeking to enter the Pacific via Cape Horn. Captain Byron was selected to explore the South Atlantic for a suitable island upon which to establish such a settlement. The South American mainland was controlled by Spain, which was hostile to the expansion of British interests in the region; to disguise Byron's mission, it was announced that he had been appointed the new Navy Commander-in-Chief, East Indies. Byron set sail in June 1764, ostensibly to take up the East Indies post. For the voyage he was granted command of the 24-gun frigate HMS Dolphin and the 16-gun sloop HMS Tamar.

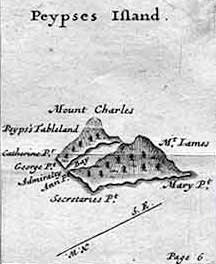
The mythical Pepys Island, which Byron searched for in 1764–1765. Illustration by William Hacke, 1699.

Byron's two-vessel flotilla crossed the Atlantic over the winter of 1764 and made its way slowly down the South American coast. The Admiralty had ordered Byron first to seek Pepys Island, reputedly discovered off the Patagonian coast by the corsair Ambrose Cowley in 1683. Byron reached the co-ordinates given by Cowley in January 1765, but there was no sign of the island and the search was swiftly abandoned. (Note: Historian Robert Rea describes Pepys Island as "completely mythical"; Cowley's description of it was either fictional or a mistaken landfall among the Falklands.) On 5 February Byron reached the Patagonian settlement of Port Desire where he resupplied his vessels from the storeship HMS Florida.

Between June 1764 and May 1766, Byron completed his own circumnavigation of the globe as captain of HMS Dolphin. This was the first such circumnavigation that was accomplished in less than 2 years. His actions nearly caused a war between Great Britain and Spain, as both countries had armed fleets ready to contest the sovereignty of the Falkland Islands. Later Byron encountered islands and extant residents of the Tuamotus and Tokelau Islands, and Nikunau in the southern Gilbert Islands; he also visited Tinian in the Northern Marianas Islands. A notable member of Byron's crew was Master's Mate Erasmus Gower, whom Byron chose to 'take a significant part' in the ceremony when he took possession of the Falkland Islands. Byron had examined Gower for his lieutenant's examination in 1762 and was so impressed that he chose him to accompany him on his own circumnavigation (1764–65) and ensured that he was appointed as lieutenant to Commander Philip Carteret immediately afterwards in the next circumnavigation (1766–69).

In 1769, he was appointed governor of Newfoundland off the mainland of Canada, an office he held for the next three years.

He was promoted to rear admiral on 31 March 1775. In 1779, he served as Commander-in-chief of the Leeward Islands Station during the American War of Independence. After being severely injured during a storm on his way to the West Indies, Byron unsuccessfully attacked a French fleet under the Comte d'Estaing at the Battle of Grenada in July 1779. He subsequently resigned his post and returned to England, where he suffered from poor health for the rest of his life.

Byron was briefly Commander-in-Chief, North American Station from 1 October 1779. He was made vice admiral of the white in September 1780.

== Family ==
John Byron Death Notice

On 8 September 1748, he married his first cousin, Sophia Trevanion, daughter of John Trevanion of Caerhays in Cornwall and Barbara Berkeley, the sister of his mother. They had two sons and seven daughters:

- Frances Byron (1749–1823), later married Charles Leigh
- Sophia Byron (died in infancy)
- Isabella Byron (died in infancy)
- Juliana Elizabeth Byron (1754–88), later married her cousin Hon. William Byron (d. 1776, son of William Byron, 5th Baron Byron)
- Sophia Maria Byron (1755–1821), the 'maiden aunt' of the poet George Gordon Byron
- John "Mad Jack" Byron (1757–91), who in turn fathered the poet George Gordon Byron, the future 6th Baron Byron
- George Anson Byron (1758–93), noted navy officer and father of George Anson Byron junior, another admiral and explorer, and later the 7th Baron Byron
- Charlotte Byron (died in infancy)
- Augusta Barbara Charlotte Byron (1762–1824), later married Admiral Christopher Parker

John was the brother of Hon. George Byron, married to Frances Levett, daughter of Elton Levett of Nottingham, a descendant of Ambrose Elton, Esq., High Sheriff of Herefordshire in 1618 and a surgeon in Nottingham.

== Death and legacy ==
According to a note written by his wife, Sophia, to their financial agent, John Byron died on 1 April 1786 at home in Bolton Row, London (not 10 April, as subsequent biographies claim). On that date nine days later his remains were buried in the Berkeley family vault situated beneath the chancel of the Church of St Mary the Virgin, Twickenham.

John's life was a great inspiration for his grandson, the poet George Gordon Byron, though they never met. The poet both drew from his grandfather's experiences in his writing, using his 'Narrative' for the shipwreck scene in Don Juan, and wrote of the kinship he felt in having such a turbulent, unlucky life: he wrote in an epistle to his half-sister Augusta Leigh that "he had no rest at sea, nor I on shore".

Byron Street in St. John's, Newfoundland and Labrador is named after him.

== In fiction ==
John Byron's experiences in the Anson voyage form the basis of the novel The Unknown Shore by Patrick O'Brian. It closely follows Byron's account in The Narrative of the Honourable John Byron (1768).

In The Dark Design by Philip José Farmer, John Byron is a crewmember of the schooner The Razzle Dazzle.

== See also ==
- Baron Byron
- Cape Byron in Australia, named after Byron
- European and American voyages of scientific exploration
- List of incidents of cannibalism
- List of Newfoundland and Labrador lieutenant-governors
- List of people of Newfoundland and Labrador

== Bibliography ==
- Brand, Emily (2020). The Fall of the House of Byron. John Murray.
- Gambier, James. "John Byron". Oxford Dictionary of National Biography.
- Shankland, Peter (1975). Byron of the Wager. Collins.
- Walker, Violet (1988). The House of Byron. Quiller Press.

Political offices
Preceded by Sir Hugh Palliser	Commodore Governor of Newfoundland; 1769–1771	Succeeded by Molyneux Shuldham
Military offices
Preceded by Samuel Barrington	Commander-in-Chief, Leeward Islands Station; 1779	Succeeded by Sir Hyde Parker
Preceded by James Gambier	Commander-in-Chief, North American Station; 1779	Succeeded by Mariot Arbuthnot
