= William Byron, 5th Baron Byron =

British politician

The Right Honourable The Lord Byron

Member of the House of Lords Lord Temporal
- In office 5 November 1743 – 19 May 1798; Hereditary peerage
- Preceded by: William Byron, 4th Baron Byron
- Succeeded by: George Gordon Byron, 6th Baron Byron

Personal details
- Born: 5 November 1722 Clayton, Lancashire
- Died: 19 May 1798 (aged 75) Hucknall, Nottinghamshire
- Spouse: Elizabeth Shaw
- Children: Hon. William Byron
- Parents: William Byron, 4th Baron Byron (father); Hon. Frances Berkeley (mother)

William Byron, 5th Baron Byron (5 November 1722 – 19 May 1798), was a British nobleman, peer, politician, and great-uncle of the poet George Gordon Byron who succeeded him in the title. As a result of a number of stories that arose after a duel, and then because of his financial difficulties, he became known after his death as "the Wicked Lord" and "the Devil Byron".

== Early life ==
Byron was the son of William Byron, 4th Baron Byron, and his wife the Hon. Frances Berkeley, a descendant of John Berkeley, 1st Baron Berkeley of Stratton. He inherited his title upon the death of his father on 18 August 1736.

He clearly had some military aspirations, enlisting in the Royal Navy as a midshipman aged 14 and serving aboard HMS Victory as a lieutenant at 18. At 17 he was also listed as a founding Governor of the Foundling Hospital, a popular charity project to look after abandoned babies that had previously been championed by his mother. After an abortive stint as a captain in the Duke of Kingston's Regiment during the Jacobite Rebellion, he went on to marry Elizabeth Shaw, daughter and heiress of Charles Shaw of Besthorpe in Norfolk, on 28 March 1747. They went on to have four children – two of whom lived to adulthood – including:

- Hon. William Byron (b. 7 June 1748 – March/May 1749).
- Hon. William Byron, MP (27 October 1749 – 22 June 1776).
- Hon. Henrietta Diana Byron (June/August 1751 – May/June 1760).
- Hon. Caroline Byron (b. 17 January 1755).

The month after his marriage he was elected Grand Master of the Premier Grand Lodge of England, a position he held until 20 March 1752. He also served as Master of the Staghounds from 1763 until 1765, though he achieved nothing of note in either role.

Byron was initiated to the Scottish Rite Masonry and became Grand Master of the Grand Lodge of England (Moderns) from 1747 to 1751.

== Duel with William Chaworth ==
On 26 January 1765, Byron killed his distant cousin and neighbour, William Chaworth, in a dispute at the 'Star and Garter' tavern (on the site of the Carlton Club), Pall Mall, in London. The fight resulted from an argument the two had been engaged in over cups of wine, with both insisting they had more game on their estates. Lord Byron and his cousin retired to a dim room to resolve their disagreement and it was there that Lord Byron thrust his sword through Chaworth's stomach. Chaworth lived until the following day, expressing his disgust that he had not been of sound enough mind to insist they fight in a location outfitted with better lighting before finally succumbing to his injury. Lord Byron was tried for Chaworth's death, but was found guilty only of manslaughter. As a peer with privilege of Parliament, he claimed the benefit of clergy under "the statute of Edward VI" (Treason Act 1547) and so instead of being "burned in the hand" was forced to pay a small fine.

== Gossip and myths ==
Lord Byron already had a poor reputation at the time of Chaworth's death – but as he awaited his trial at the Tower of London, Horace Walpole described how countless malicious stories about him were 'revived or invented'. Some contained a kernel of truth, but others were entirely fabricated. They included the accusations that he had murdered a coachman and paid off his family, and that he had murdered his own wife.

Many more myths about him were first set in print in the 19th century, decades after his death. These first appear in the 1820s and 1830s, some of which appear to have been invented by the American writer Washington Irving, including:

- That he became a recluse at Newstead Abbey after the duel of 1765;
- That he intentionally laid waste to his estates and the Byron family fortune in revenge for his son's disobedience;
- That he mounted the sword he used to kill Chaworth on the wall in his bedroom at Newstead Abbey;
- That he spent his youth organising orgies at Newstead Abbey; and spent his later years worshipping Satan;
- That in his eccentric, perhaps insane, old age, he cultivated a swarm of crickets, which he trained to race all over his body and which abandoned his home at the moment of his death.

The stories have been propagated particularly by biographers of Byron's great-nephew, the poet.

== After the duel ==
Far from becoming a recluse, immediately after the duel, Byron planned a holiday to the Austrian Netherlands town of Spa with his wife and sister, Isabella, Lady Carlisle. The latter noted that the couple were unable to control their spending, calling them "ye worst managers I ever saw".

Sometime in the late 1760s, Byron schemed to resolve his serious financial difficulties by marrying his son and heir William into a wealthy family. But just before the marriage William eloped with his cousin Juliana Byron, the daughter of Byron's younger brother, the naval captain and later Vice-Admiral John Byron.

Despite the myth that Lord Byron became enraged by his son's elopement and subsequently tried to wreak revenge by ruining his inheritance – tearing down trees, selling off artworks and killing over 2000 deer – the fall of the estate in fact came about because Lord Byron simply could not pay his debts without the cash injection through an affluent daughter-in-law.

The real neglect of Newstead did not occur until after the death of Byron's son in 1776 – this left Byron legally unable to sell off parts of his lands and estate without the permission of an adult heir (his grandson was not due to turn 21 until 1793).

In around 1778, he was forced to sell off the majority of his effects at Newstead Abbey, in what became known as the "Great Sale" – this included artistic masterpieces, hunting gear, furniture and even toothpicks. His wife Elizabeth left him shortly afterwards, taking their only surviving child Caroline with her. Caroline died in 1784, leaving the couple childless.

Later accounts attest that he subsequently took one of the servants, Elizabeth Hardstaff, as his mistress and that she became known as "Lady Betty". Though there is no solid evidence of a relationship, she was one of the few people mentioned in his will.

== Death and legacy ==
Byron also outlived his grandson, a young man who, at the age of twenty-two, was killed by cannon fire in 1794 while fighting in Corsica. Expectation of the barony then fell to his great-nephew, George Gordon Byron, who became the 6th Baron Byron when Lord Byron died on 21 May 1798, at the age of seventy-five. The 5th Baron Byron is buried in the Byron vault at the Church of St Mary Magdalene, Hucknall, Hucknall Torkard in Nottinghamshire.

=== Arms ===
Coat of arms of William Byron, 5th Baron Byron
Coronet A Coronet of a Baron Crest A Mermaid proper Escutcheon Argent three Bendlets enhanced Gules Supporters On either side a Horse of a brown bay colour unguled Or Motto Crede Byron (Trust Byron)

== Bibliography ==
- Emily Brand, The Fall of the House of Byron (John Murray, 2020)
- J. V. Beckett (with Sheila Aley), Byron and Newstead: The Aristocrat and the Abbey (University of Delaware Press, 2001)
- W. S. Ansley Ferrall, 'On the Duel' (London: Houlston and Stoneman, 1838)
- The trial of William Lord Byron, Baron Byron of Rochdale, for the murder of William Chaworth, Esq.; before the Right Honourable the House of Peers, in Westminster-Hall, in full Parliament on Tuesday the 16th, and Wednesday the 17th of April, 1765 (London: Samuel Billingsley, 1765)

Masonic offices
Preceded by The Lord Cranstoun	Grand Master of the Premier Grand Lodge of England; 1747–1752	Succeeded by The Lord Carysfort
Political offices
Preceded by Lord Robert Manners-Sutton	Master of the Staghounds; 1763–1765	Succeeded by The Viscount Galway
Peerage of England
Preceded by William Byron	Baron Byron; 1736–1798	Succeeded by George Gordon Byron
