= Sylph (disambiguation) =

A sylph is a mythological creature in western tradition.

Sylph may also refer to:

== Biology ==
- The hummingbird genus Aglaiocercus which includes:
  - Long-tailed sylph
  - Violet-tailed sylph
  - Venezuelan sylph
- The skipper butterfly genus Metisella which are called sylphs
- The dragonfly genus Macrothemis which are called sylphs

== Ships ==
- Sylph (ship)
  - Sylph (1791 ship), a British merchant ship
  - Sylph (1831 ship), one of two Age of Sail merchant vessels of that name
  - Sylph (pilot boat)
  - HMS Sylph (disambiguation)
  - USS Sylph (disambiguation)

== Other uses ==
- La Sylphide, a ballet
- The Sylph, a 1778 novel by Georgiana Cavendish, Duchess of Devonshire
- Sylph (Dungeons & Dragons)
- Sylph Comics, a shōjo manga publishing label under ASCII Media Works
  - Sylph (magazine), a shōjo manga magazine published by ASCII Media Works

== See also ==
- All pages with titles containing Sylph
- All pages with titles containing Sylphe
- Sylpheed, an open-source e-mail client and news client licensed under the GPL
