= Sylph (ship) =

Several ships have been named Sylph, for the Sylph, a mythological creature in western tradition.

- Sylph (1791 ship) was launched at Whitby. She made one voyage for the British East India Company (EIC) to New South Wales and China. However, a French privateer captured her in 1798 as she was returning to England.
- Sylph (1815 ship) was a brig of 150 tons (bm) launched at Chittagong. She was later renamed Laura, and was sold at Mauritius.
- Sylph, of 233 tons (bm) and six guns was launched in 1812 and commissioned in Baltimore in 1814 as a privateer
- Sylph (1831 ship) was a clipper ship built in Calcutta. Her primary role was to transport opium between various ports in the Far East. She disappeared en route to Singapore in 1849.
- Sylph (pilot boat) 19th-century pilot boat first built in 1834, by Whitmore & Holbrook.

== Naval vessels ==
- HCS Sylph (1806) was a schooner of six or eight guns that the Bombay Dockyard launched for the Bombay Marine. The British East India company sold her into mercantile service in 1826 and she was still listed in 1829.
- HMS Sylph – any one of six vessels of that name
- USS Sylph – any one of four vessels of that name
