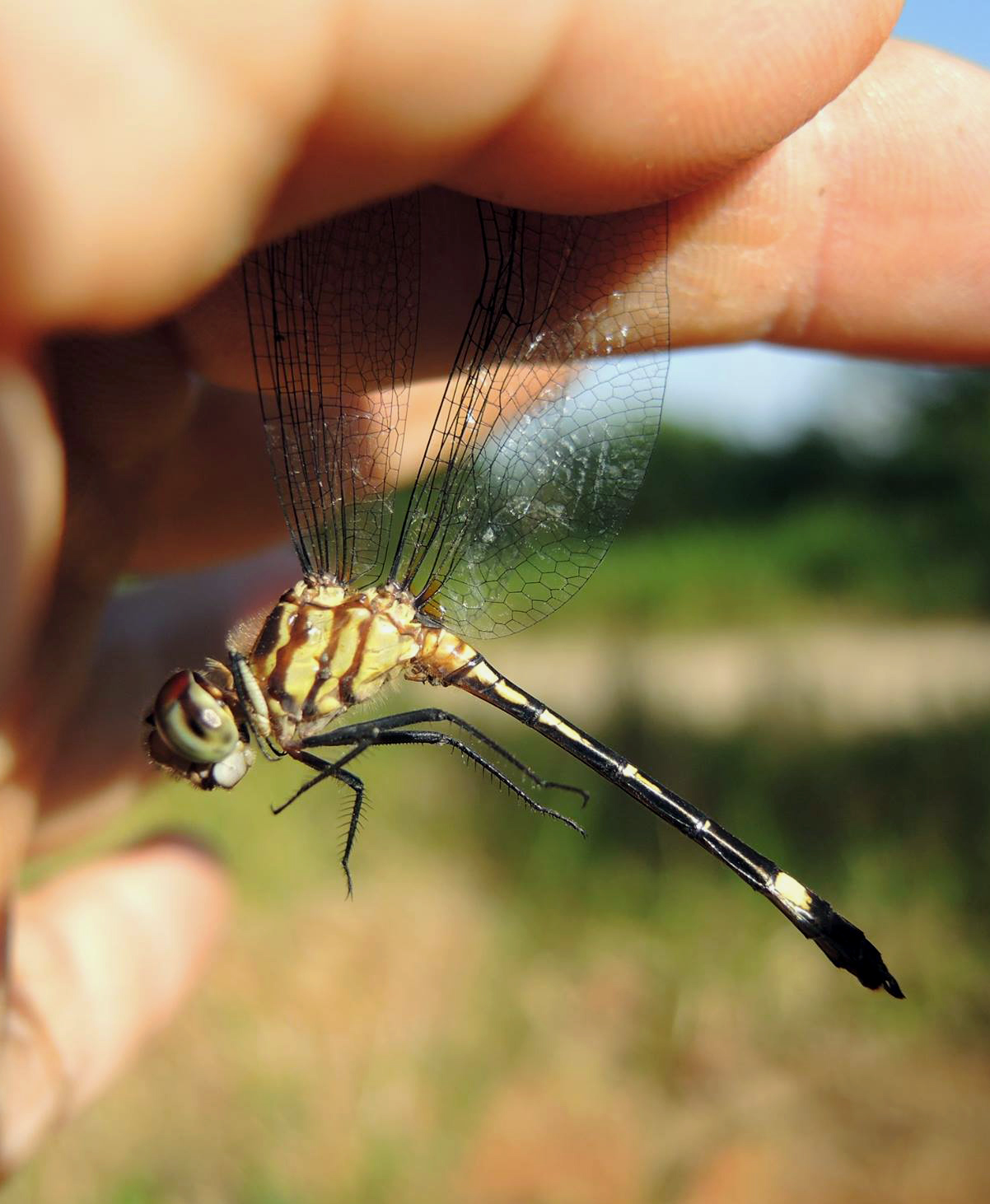

Conservation status
- Least Concern (IUCN 3.1)

Scientific classification
- Kingdom: Animalia
- Phylum: Arthropoda
- Class: Insecta
- Order: Odonata
- Infraorder: Anisoptera
- Family: Libellulidae
- Genus: Macrothemis
- Species: M. inequiunguis

Binomial name
- Macrothemis inequiunguis Calvert, 1895

= Macrothemis inequiunguis =

Species of dragonfly

Macrothemis inequiunguis, the jade-striped sylph, is a species of skimmer in the dragonfly family Libellulidae. It is found in Central America, North America, and South America.

The IUCN conservation status of Macrothemis inequiunguis is "LC", least concern, with no immediate threat to the species' survival. The population is stable. The IUCN status was reviewed in 2017.
