= Berlepsch =

Berlepsch is a German surname. Notable people with the surname include:

- Baron August von Berlepsch (1815–1877), beekeeper
- Baron August Adolph von Berlepsch (1790–1867), head state forester of Saxony
- Baron Dietrich Otto von Berlepsch (1823–1896), president of the state consistory of the Evangelical-Lutheran Church of Saxony
- Emilie von Berlepsch (née von Oppel; 1755–1830), German author
- Erich Volkmar von Berlepsch (ca. 1525–1589), judge and senior civil servant
- Baron Friedrich Ludwig von Berlepsch (1749–1818), judge in Hanover
- Hans von Berlepsch (ca. 1480–1533), civil servant at Wartburg Castle who sheltered Martin Luther
- Baron Hans von Berlepsch (1857–1933), ornithologist
- Count Hans von Berlepsch (1850–1915), ornithologist
- Hans Eduard von Berlepsch-Valendas (1849–1921), Swiss architect and painter
- Baron Hans Hermann von Berlepsch (1843–1926), Prussian government minister
- Hartmann von Berlepsch (1601–1671), cavalry captain
- Heinrich Moritz von Berlepsch (1736–1809), Saxon chamberlain
- Count Karl von Berlepsch (1882–1955), regional poet and author
- Count Karl von Berlepsch (1821–1893), hereditary treasurer of the Electorate of Hesse
- Karoline von Berlepsch (1820–1877), Countess of Bergen
- Otto Wilhelm von Berlepsch (1618–1683), Saxon general
- Baron Tilo von Berlepsch (1913–1991), actor
