= Sophia Briscoe =

English author fl. 1770s

- Born: England
- Died: possibly 1826
- Occupation: Author
- Notable work: Miss Melmoth; or the New Clarissa (1771); The Fine Lady (1772)

Sophia Briscoe (fl. 1770s) was an English author of two epistolary novels. Little is known of her life.

From the official documents available within a reasonable time frame and area of her (limited) known life, it appears that Sophia Briscoe was ‘independent’ in her profession, born in ‘Came County’ and was put on record at age 40. This independence may allude to a career as a writer, despite only producing two pieces of epistolary verse.

The next debated record of Briscoe may be one regarding her death, listed in the London Gazette’s Royal Assurance Office on October 5, 1826, at St. Giles’ in Reading, Berkshire. However, as these accounts were not the only listings under this name, this cannot be taken as fact.

== Novels ==
Briscoe was the author of the epistolary novels Miss Melmoth; or the New Clarissa (1771) and The Fine Lady: A Novel (sometimes The Fine Lady; or a history of Mrs. Montague, 1772). Briscoe was paid 20 guineas for the copyright of The Fine Lady. A German translation of The Fine Lady appeared as Die Frau nach der Mode in Leipzig, dated 1771.

Miss Melmoth was well received in The Critical Review. The Monthly Review mildly commended it. In the twentieth century, Briscoe came to the attention of new readers: she was listed in Dale Spender's Mothers of the Novel: 100 Good Women Writers Before Jane Austen (1986) and the treatment of incest in Miss Melmoth (Caroline Melmoth shies away from marrying Sir John Evelin instinctively, before discovering their relationship) has been discussed along with other aspects by at least one contemporary critic.

== Attribution ==
It has been speculated that The Sylph, a novel published in 1778 and attributed to Georgiana Cavendish, Duchess of Devonshire, was written by Briscoe. A receipt at the British Library suggests the publisher T. Lowndes paid Briscoe £12 for it, but it is thought likelier on stylistic grounds that Briscoe simply served as an intermediary, so that the Duchess could retain her anonymity. The novel has its champions to this day.

== Letter to Pitt? ==
Little further is known of Sophia Briscoe. It is not possible to say whether the person who wrote from Leyton, Essex, to William Pitt the Younger on 14 December 1797, on the subject of taxation, was the novelist or a namesake.
