= Georgiana Cavendish, Duchess of Devonshire =

English socialite, activist, and author (1757–1806)

Her Grace The Duchess of Devonshire
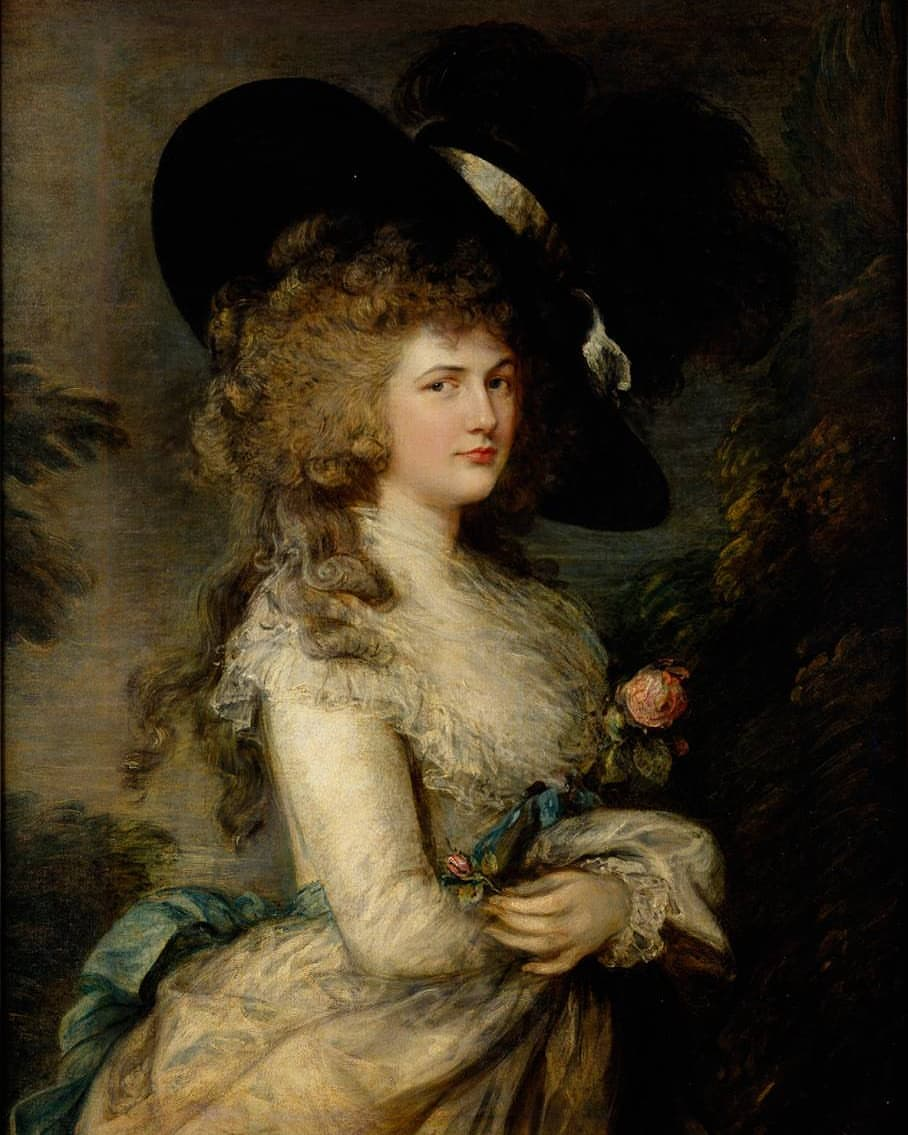
- Portrait of Georgiana, Duchess of Devonshire by Thomas Gainsborough, 1785–1787
- Born: Georgiana Spencer; 7 June 1757; Althorp, Northamptonshire, England
- Died: 30 March 1806 (aged 48); Devonshire House, Westminster, London, England
- Buried: Derby Cathedral
- Noble family: Spencer (by birth); Cavendish (by marriage)
- Spouse: William Cavendish, 5th Duke of Devonshire (m. 1774)
- Issue: Georgiana Howard, Countess of Carlisle; Harriet Leveson-Gower, Countess Granville; William Cavendish, 6th Duke of Devonshire; Eliza Courtney (illegitimate)
- Father: John Spencer, 1st Earl Spencer
- Mother: Margaret Georgiana Poyntz
- Occupation: Socialite; author; activist

Georgiana Cavendish, Duchess of Devonshire (née Spencer; /dʒɔːrˈdʒeɪnə/ jor-JAY-nə; 7 June 1757 – 30 March 1806), was an English aristocrat, socialite, political organiser for the Whigs, author, and activist. Born into the Spencer family and married into the Cavendish family, she was the first wife of William Cavendish, 5th Duke of Devonshire, and the mother of the 6th Duke of Devonshire.

The Duchess was famous for her charisma, political influence, beauty, unusual marital arrangement, love affairs, socializing, and notoriety for her gambling addiction, leading to an immense debt. She was the great-great-great-grandaunt of Diana, Princess of Wales. Their lives, two centuries apart, have been compared in tragedy.

== Early life and family ==
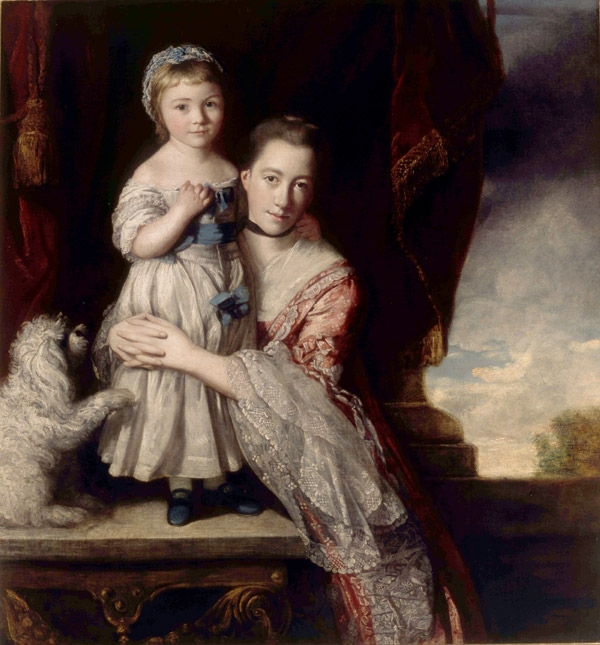
A young Miss Georgiana Spencer with her mother, Margaret Georgiana Spencer. Painting by Sir Joshua Reynolds.

The Duchess was born Miss Georgiana Spencer, on 7 June 1757, as the first child of John Spencer (later Earl Spencer) and his wife, Georgiana (née Poyntz, later Countess Spencer), at the Spencer family home, Althorp. After her daughter's birth, her mother Lady Spencer wrote that "I will own I feel so partial to my Dear little Gee, that I think I never shall love another so well." Two younger siblings followed: Henrietta ("Harriet") and George. The daughter of her sister Henrietta, Lady Caroline Lamb, would become a writer and lover of Lord Byron. John Spencer, a great-grandson of John Churchill, 1st Duke of Marlborough, came from a wealthy English noble family. He built Spencer House as a family residence at St. James's, London, and raised his children there. Lord and Lady Spencer had what was considered an unusually happy and demonstrably affectionate marriage for the era, raising their children according to the "modern" and enlightened ideas of John Locke and Jean-Jacques Rousseau. Georgiana was the family favourite and had an extraordinary close bond with her mother, who confessed to favouring her over her other children, but this stability ended abruptly when she was separated from her parents when they travelled to Italy for her father's health. While her mother admitted it was "difficult" to leave her behind, her primary devotion was to her husband, rather than her children. This abandonment was a profound shock to Georgiana, who became noticeably anxious to please and emotionally dependent on those around her.

When her father assumed the title of Viscount Spencer in 1761, she became The Honourable Georgiana Spencer. In 1765, her father became Earl Spencer, and she Lady Georgiana Spencer.

In 1766, the death of the Spencers' fourth child, soon after her first birthday, and then the loss of another daughter after only a few weeks just three years later, started an era of obsessive travelling and gambling as they sought distraction from their "heavy affliction". Georgiana's mother attempted to balance the worldly vice of gambling until dawn with self-denial and good works, but was aware, as were others, that this obsession was not based on a real religious devotion. The gambling that absorbed both her troubled parents' attention and became a household routine would become a pervasive influence for the rest of Georgiana's life.

== Marriage and children ==
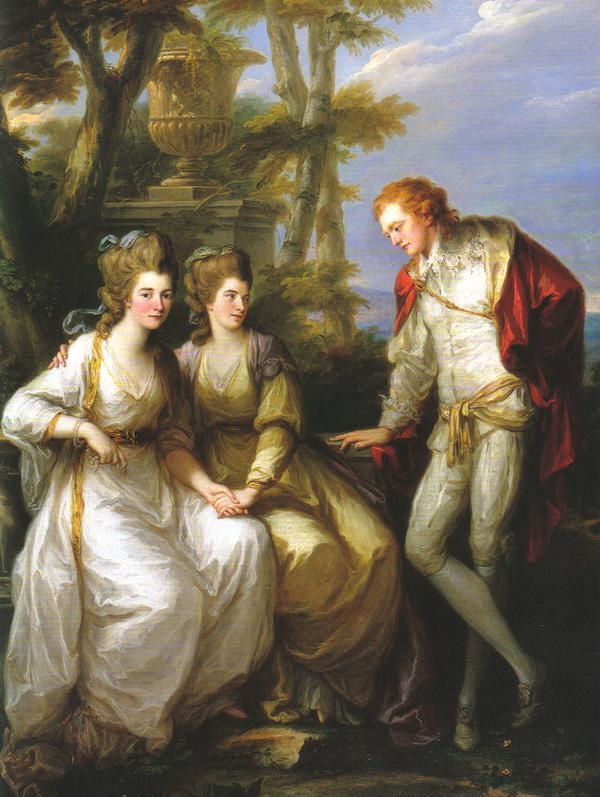
With her siblings, Henrietta and George, by Angelica Kauffman, c. 1774. The painting was painted just before Georgiana's marriage to the Duke of Devonshire.

On her seventeenth birthday, 7 June 1774, Lady Georgiana Spencer was married to society's most eligible bachelor, William Cavendish, the 5th Duke of Devonshire, who was nine years her senior. The wedding took place at Wimbledon Parish Church. It was a small ceremony attended only by her parents, her paternal grandmother Lady Cowper, one of her prospective brothers-in-law, and her soon-to-be sister-in-law, the Duchess of Portland. Her parents were reluctant to let their daughter go, and while she was now married to one of the wealthiest and most powerful men in the land, still attempted to exert their parental influence and keep her emotionally dependent on them. Her father, who had always shown affection to his children, wrote to her, "But indeed my Dearest Georgiana, I did not know until lately how much I loved you; I miss you every day and every hour." The bond between Georgiana and her mother continued after her marriage in a lifelong correspondence; many of their letters survive.

Unlike her mother, Georgiana had not been out in society for several seasons, nor had she accepted the Duke because she loved and preferred him to all others. The Duke of Devonshire, referred to as "the Duke" by his family and friends, was a notoriously reserved and taciturn man, described as being "incapable of any strong emotion, and destitute of all energy and activity of mind." Primarily motivated to please her parents with an illustrious marriage, Georgiana believed that the Duke's outward detachment might conceal a loving personality similar to her introverted father's, and that in their marriage she would be both wife and companion. She was sadly mistaken; although they grew closer in later life, at the beginning of their marriage the Duke could not meet Georgiana's emotional needs, and she quickly learned her role was solely to produce an heir and fulfil her social obligations. They had few interests in common, and as society dictated it was unfashionable for husband and wife to be seen too much in each other's company, the Duke was able to resume his bachelor lifestyle by spending nights playing cards at Brooks's. But that also allowed Georgiana to pursue her own gambling addiction.

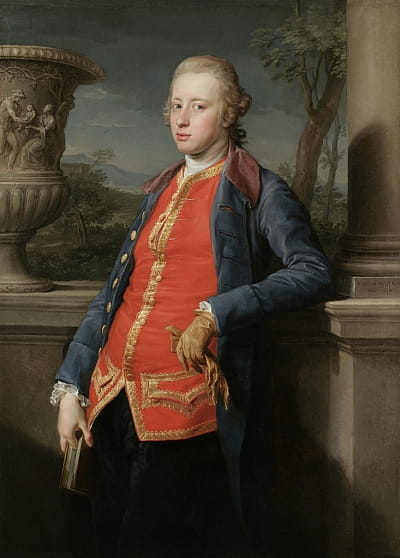
William Cavendish, 5th Duke of Devonshire, 1768, painted in Italy by Pompeo Batoni

Georgiana embraced the frenetic whirl of society and all the distractions it offered. Her position meant that she was a fashion leader, and her wit, personality and innate sense of style quickly made her a sought-after popular figure in her own right. Public speculation as to when her frenetic lifestyle would lead to collapse was satisfied when she miscarried for the second time in April 1776. One contributing stressor was that she was deeply in debt and afraid to tell the Duke; she had hoped to be forgiven following the birth of their first child. This situation worsened as the Duke sided with popular opinion, which blamed her miscarriage on her reckless lifestyle. When her creditors threatened to apply to him, she was forced to confide in her parents. Furious, they paid her debts, but insisted that she confess to the Duke. He repaid them and then did not refer to the matter. If Lady Spencer was shaken to discover that her daughter withheld secrets from her, Georgiana was more unnerved that the matter was met by silence on the part of her husband, rather than by anger.

Before their marriage, the Duke had fathered an illegitimate daughter, Charlotte Williams, born from a dalliance with a former milliner, Charlotte Spencer (of no relation to the House of Spencer). This was unknown to the Duchess until years after her marriage to the Duke. After the death of the child's mother, the Duke chose to take responsibility for her, and the Duchess was asked to raise Charlotte herself. Georgiana was "very pleased" with Charlotte, although her own mother Lady Spencer expressed disapproval: "I hope you have not talk'd of her to people". The besotted Georgiana replied, "She is the best humoured little thing you ever saw".

At end of 1777, Georgiana met Mrs Mary Graham. They were introduced while Georgiana was in Brighton to improve her fertility, while Mary was there for her fragile health. Lady Clermont reported to Lady Spencer about Georgiana's instant closeness to Mary, describing her as "a very pretty sort of girl. I wish she had half a dozen more such favourites". They would correspond passionately; Georgiana had finally found someone genuine to whom she could vent without judgement or remorse. But, in 1781, the doctor ordered Mary to be taken to a warmer climate for her weak lungs. Georgiana was devastated and tried to seek her replacement, with no avail.

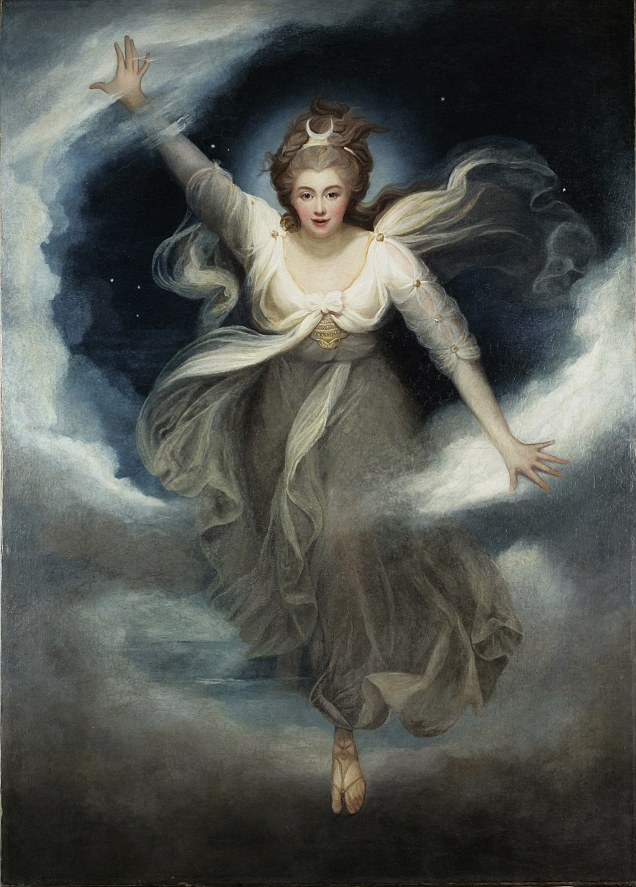
Duchess of Devonshire as Cynthia by Maria Cosway circa 1782. Depicted as a character from Spenser's Faerie Queene.

In 1782, while on a retreat from London with the Duke, Georgiana met Lady Elizabeth Foster (widely known as "Bess") in the City of Bath. She became close friends with Bess, who had become destitute after separating from her husband and two sons. Given the bond that developed between the two women (and the difficult position her new friend was in), with the Duke's acquiescence Georgiana agreed to have Lady Elizabeth live with them. When the Duke began a sexual relationship with Lady Elizabeth, a ménage à trois was established, and it was arranged that Lady Elizabeth live with them permanently. While it was common for male members of the upper class to have mistresses, and female aristocrats to have lovers, it was not common or generally acceptable for a mistress to live so openly with a married couple. Furthermore, Georgiana had been desperately lonely since her marriage to the Duke, and finally having found what she believed to be the ideal friend, she became emotionally close to Lady Elizabeth. Whatever she really thought about it, the Duchess certainly became complicit in her best friend's affair with her husband. In one of her letters, Georgiana wrote to Bess, "My dear Bess, Do you hear the voice of my heart crying to you? Do you feel what it is for me to be separated from you?" It seems Bess too had a deep emotional connection with Georgiana: at her death years later, a locket of Georgiana's hair was found around Elizabeth's neck, as well as a bracelet also containing hair of Georgiana on a table beside her deathbed. In modern times it's been suggested that Lady Elizabeth insinuated her way into the marriage by taking advantage of the Duchess's friendship and codependency on her, and "engineered her way" into a sexual relationship with the Duke. It's true that Lady Elizabeth also engaged in well-documented sexual relations with other men while she was in the "love triangle" with the Duke and Duchess. Among their contemporaries, the relationship between the Duchess of Devonshire and Lady Elizabeth Foster was the subject of speculation, which has continued beyond their time. The love triangle itself was a notorious topic; it was an irregular arrangement in a high-profile marriage. Lady Elizabeth's affair with the Duke resulted in two illegitimate children: a daughter, Caroline Rosalie St Jules, and a son, Augustus Clifford.

The Duchess of Devonshire by Thomas Gainsborough, 1783

Despite her detached and philandering husband and volatile marriage, social norms dictated that Georgiana must produce an heir for an extra-marital sexual liaison on her part to be socially acceptable. The first successful pregnancy resulted in the birth of Lady Georgiana Dorothy Cavendish on 12 July 1783. Called "Little G", she would grow up to become the Countess of Carlisle. Georgiana developed a strong mothering sentiment raising Charlotte, and she insisted on nursing her own children (contrary to the aristocratic custom of having a wet nurse). On 29 August 1785, a second successful pregnancy resulted in another daughter: Lady Harriet Elizabeth Cavendish, called "Harryo", who would become Countess Granville. Finally, on 21 May 1790, the Duchess gave birth to a male heir to the dukedom: William George Spencer Cavendish, who took the title of Marquess of Hartington at birth, and was called "Hart". He would never marry and would become known as "the bachelor duke". With the birth of the Marquess of Hartington, Georgiana was able to take a lover.

While there is no evidence of when Georgiana began her affair with Charles Grey (later Earl Grey), she did become pregnant by him in 1791. Sent off to France, Georgiana believed she would die in childbirth. Despondent, she wrote a letter to her recently born son stating, "As soon as you are old enough to understand this letter, it will be given to you. It contains the only present I can make you—my blessing, written in my blood... Alas, I am gone before you could know me, but I lov'd you, I nurs'd you nine months at my breast. I love you dearly." On 20 February 1792, Eliza Courtney was born without complications. Georgiana's heart was broken yet again when she was forced to give away her illegitimate daughter Eliza to Grey's family. Georgiana would later pay many visits to her daughter, providing her with presents and affection, and Eliza would grow up to marry Lieutenant-Colonel Robert Ellice and bear a daughter named Georgiana.

While in exile in France in the early 1790s, Georgiana suffered from isolation and sorely felt the separation from her children. To her eldest, she wrote, "Your letter dated the 1st of Nov was delightful to me tho' it made me very melancholy my Dearest Child. This year has been the most painful of my life ... when I do return to you, never leave you I hope again—it will be too great a happiness for me Dear Georgiana & it will have been purchased by many days of regret—indeed ev'ry hour I pass away from you, I regret you; if I amuse myself or see anything I admire I long to share the happiness with you—if on the contrary, I am out of spirits I wish for your presence which alone would do me good". In order to return to England and her children, she conceded to her husband's demands and renounced her love for Charles Grey. Family records of her exile in France were subsequently erased. However, during that period, the children of the Duke and Duchess had at one point been informed of the reason for her absence.

While the Duchess of Devonshire coped with the marital arrangements on the surface throughout her marriage, possibly as a result she suffered emotional challenges, although she clearly had an addictive nature which dated from before her marriage. She sought personal consolation from a "dissipated existence" in passions (socialising, fashion, politics, writing), addictions (gambling, drinking, and drugs), and affairs (with several men, not just Grey, possibly including the bachelor John Sackville, 3rd Duke of Dorset).

== Character ==
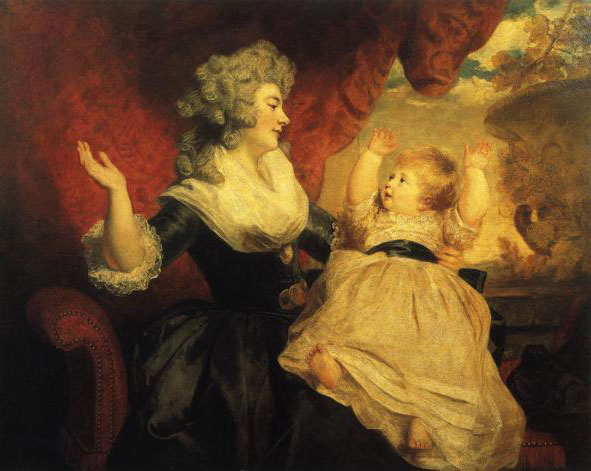
With her daughter Lady Georgiana by Joshua Reynolds, c. 1785

Georgiana was charismatic, generous, good-humoured, and intelligent. Kind-hearted, Georgiana instinctively wanted to help others and from a young age, happily gave her money to poor children or to her desperate friends. Lady Charlotte Bury wrote of Georgiana's generosity: "when some individual came to her in pecuniary distress, she would always relieve him or her, and leave her own difficulties unprovided for. Oftentimes she was wrong in doing so. ... One must be just before one is generous. But it is impossible not to be charmed by the kindly impulse which made her, without a moment's hesitating, shield another from distress." Georgiana's empathy extended towards animals as well. After noticing a starving cow in a field, Georgiana deduced its owner could not afford to feed it; she had the man found and gave him some money.

Despite being extremely self-conscious and making strenuous efforts to appear perfect, Georgiana "always appeared natural, even when she was called upon to open a ball in front of 800 people. She could engage in friendly chatter with several people simultaneously" and still make each person feel special. Widely described as almost impossible to dislike, Georgiana captured the hearts of almost everyone she met. The artist Mrs. Delaney, Mary Delany, echoed many who recorded their experiences meeting Georgiana: "[She was] so agreeable, so obliging in her manner, that I am quite in love with her. I can't tell you the civil things she said, and really they deserve a better name, which is kindness embellished by politeness. I hope she will illumine and reform her contemporaries!" Even the prudish Frances Burney was begrudgingly won over by Georgiana's unassuming grace. Georgiana was not a snob, and lacked the condescending airs of the aristocracy; she made people of all classes feel valued and at ease in her company. An example of her lack of airs was shown when Georgiana pointedly danced with French actor Monsieur Tessier after the Duchess of Manchester snobbishly refused to speak to him because he earned a living.

From childhood, Georgiana showed a characteristic need to please others, and a need for attention. Her mother Georgiana Spencer, Countess Spencer had an interest in education for girls and had discussed being patron of the educational academy that the Bluestocking poet Anna Laetitia Barbauld was to establish. Georgiana's mother raised her daughter to behave as if she were a courtier, always on show. This strict education and training had a counter-effect, only augmenting Georgiana's people-pleasing tendencies. Lady Spencer knew she was partly responsible for her daughter's faults, and worried for her daughter's future. Her natural temperament, combined with her breeding, made Georgiana into an excitable, impressionable young woman vulnerable to peer pressure. Indeed, Georgiana did the opposite of what Mary Delany hoped, and was instead corrupted by her contemporaries. Her inability to say no to her degenerate friends in the ton led Georgiana into many scrapes against her better judgement and made her feel shame over her behaviour.

Despite her efforts, Georgiana could not overcome her contradictions. She was a popular leader of society who was widely beloved and yet she was insecure and became dependent upon Lady Elizabeth Foster. She was said to be a loyal friend, but nevertheless manipulated and never repaid trusted friends for money to pay her gambling debts. Georgiana sympathized with the plight of the poor yet could not stop her own extravagant gambling addiction.

== Pursuits and fame ==
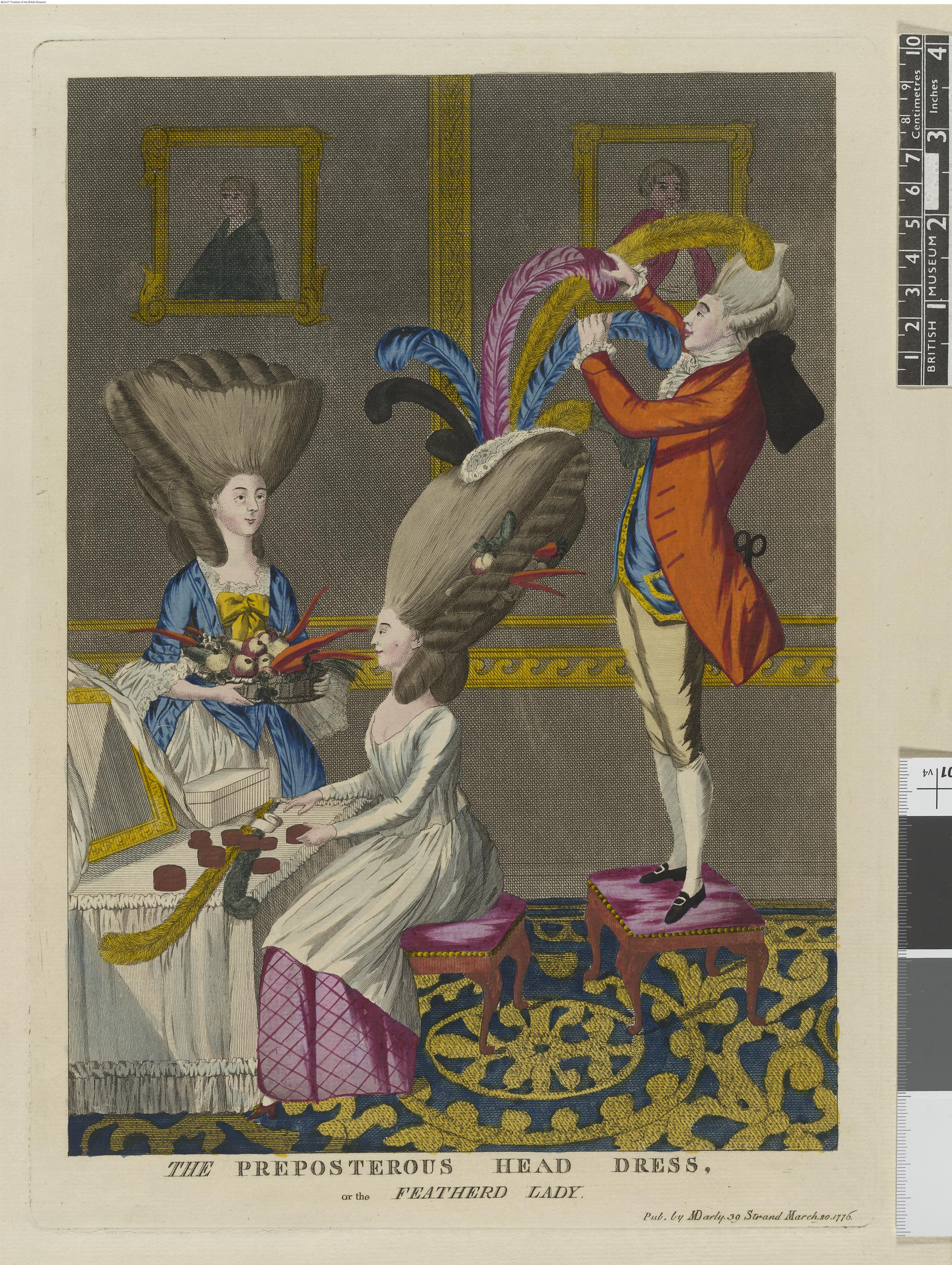
The preposterous head dress, or the featherd lady, caricature c. 1776

With her personal style, social activities, and charitable work and marriage to the Duke of Devonshire, the Duchess of Devonshire was a prominent figure of the society. Georgiana received a level of public and media attention that is often compared to her descendant, Diana, Princess of Wales. Like Diana, Georgiana's personal and social activities were frequently reported on by the press of the time. It has been noted that Georgiana and Diana had much in common: maternal abandonment issues as a child, a famously unhappy marriage, a binge-eating disorder, the common touch, a desire to be the centre of attention, and a mutual love for their children.

Like her friend Marie Antoinette, the Duchess of Devonshire was one of the fashion icons of their time, and her style made her the leader of fashion in England. Every outfit and every hairstyle Georgiana wore, immediately had an influence on the masses. The styling of her hair alone reached extraordinary heights above her outfits. In 1774, Lord Stormont presented her with an ostrich feather from Paris that was four feet long. Overnight, it became a huge trend.

Using her influence as a socialite and fashion icon, the Duchess of Devonshire contributed to politics, science, and literature. As part of her famed social engagements, the Duchess would gather around her a large salon of literary and political figures. Among her notable acquaintances were influential figures of her time, including the Prince of Wales (later King George IV); Marie Antoinette of France; and her favourite in court, the Duchess of Polignac; Charles Grey (later Earl Grey and British Prime Minister); and Lady Melbourne (lover of the Prince of Wales). Newspapers chronicled her appearance and activity.

She was called a "phenomenon" by Horace Walpole who proclaimed, "[she] effaces all without being a beauty; but her youthful figure, flowing good nature, sense and lively modesty, and modest familiarity make her a phenomenon." Madame d'Arblay, who had a preference for acquaintances of talent, found that her appeal was not generally for her beauty but for far more, which included her fine "manner, politeness, and gentle quiet". Sir Nathaniel Wraxall stated that her success as an individual lay "in the amenity and graces of her deportment, in her irresistible manners, and the seduction of her society."

Famously, when the Duchess was stepping out of her carriage one day, an Irish dustman exclaimed: "Love and bless you, my lady, let me light my pipe in your eyes!" Thereafter, whenever others would compliment her, the Duchess would retort, "After the dustman's compliment, all others are insipid."

=== Politics ===
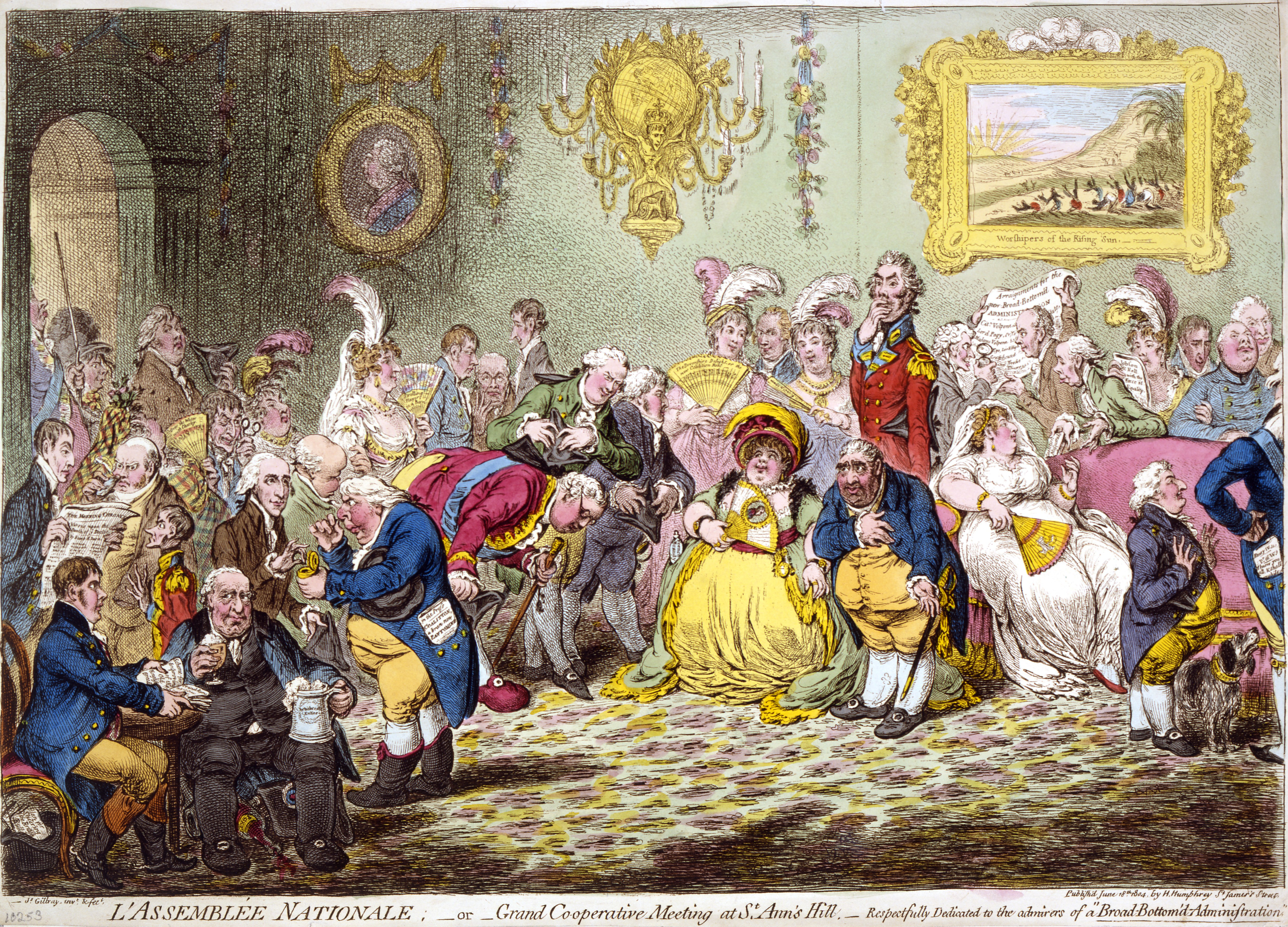
L'Assemblee Nationale, satirical print by James Gillray, 1804. The leading Whigs gather at the house of Charles James Fox after a supposed revolution in England. Georgiana is in the centre at back, with an open fan

The Spencer family, from which the Duchess derived, was an ardent supporter of the Whig party as were she and the Cavendish family. However, because the Duke's high position in the peerage disallowed him from participating so commonly in politics, Georgiana took it as a positive outlet for herself. In an age when the realisation of women's rights and suffrage were still more than a century away, Georgiana became a political activist; she was the first woman to make active and influential front line appearances on the political scene. Having begun her involvement in politics in 1778 (when she inspired a mass of women to promote the Whig party), she relished enlightenment and Whig party ideals and took it upon herself to campaign—particularly for a distant cousin, Charles James Fox, who was chief party leader alongside Richard Brinsley Sheridan—for Whig policies that were anti-monarchy, advocating for liberty against tyranny.

At the time of her involvement, King George III (who detested the Whigs) and his ministers had a direct influence over the House of Commons, principally through their power of patronage. The Prince of Wales, who always relished going against the grain with his father, joined the Whig party when his friend the Duchess became involved. She was renowned for hosting dinners that became political meetings, and she took joy in cultivating the company of brilliant radicals.

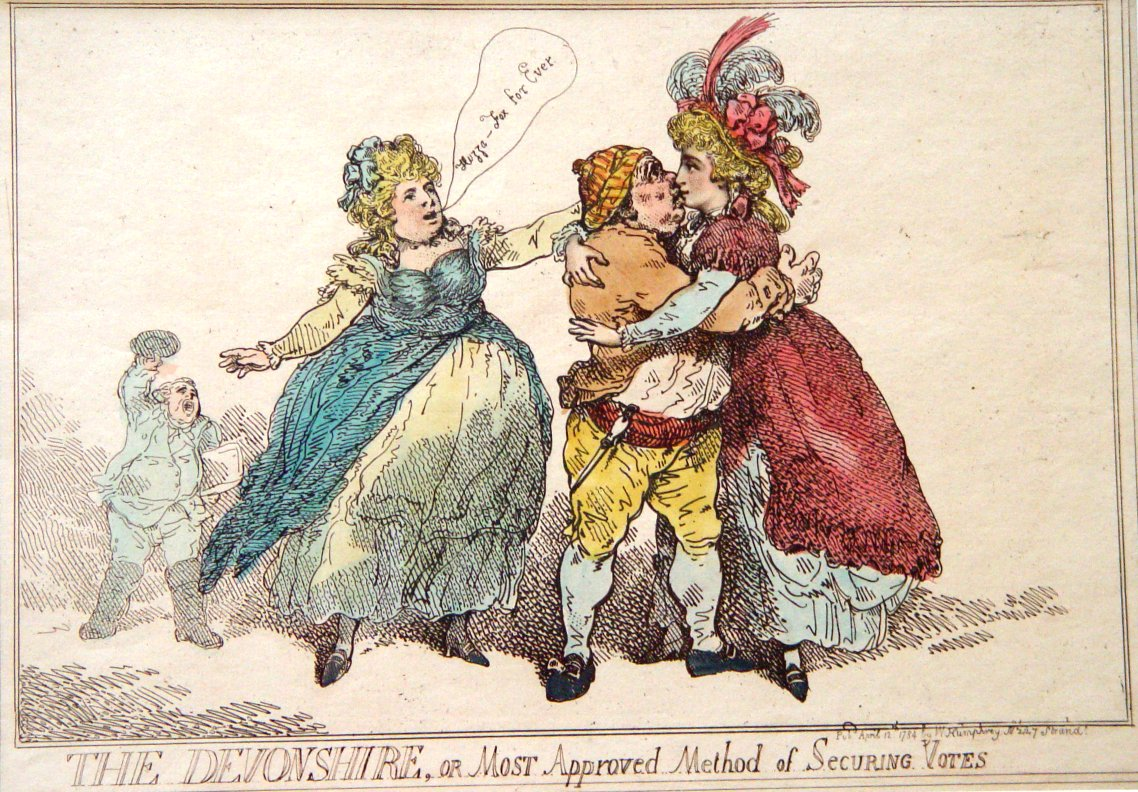
"THE DEVONSHIRE, or Most Approved Method of Securing Votes", by Thomas Rowlandson, 1784

During the general election of 1784, Georgiana became a major subject of scrutiny. Fanciful rumours and political cartoons circulated during the campaign, ridiculing her for securing votes in exchange for sexual and monetary rewards. Thomas Rowlandson even satirised her with a rumour of her trading kisses in his print "THE DEVONSHIRE, or Most Approved Method of Securing Votes". Her mother pleaded with her to step down. Still, Georgiana was not daunted and was adamant in her activism. On election day, the Duchess of Devonshire walked the streets of London, gaining blisters on her feet, meeting face-to-face with commoners as equals. She was instrumental in the success of Fox and Lord Hood. After the extensive campaigning and negative media onslaught against her, after the win, she retired from the political arena for a while. In 1788, she returned to political activism, albeit, behind the scenes.

The Duchess and her sister at the 1788 Westminster by-election, watercolour by Robert Dighton

Even in the last years of her life, she pushed ahead in the field and attempted to help rebuild the Whig party, which had become fragmented; her efforts were to no avail, and the political party would eventually come to dissolve decades after her death.

=== Literature ===
Associating with the Blue Stockings Society enabled Georgiana to develop close friendships with female novelists and intellectuals; she herself was an avid writer, composing several works, of both prose and poetry, of which some were published. She composed poetry to her father as a young girl, and some of it later circulated in manuscript. It was read by Walpole (who said it was "easy and prettily expressed, though it does not express much") and by Reverend William Mason, who was more favorable with higher opinions. In 1776, aged nineteen, she composed a poem, To Myself, which addressed the public perception of her.

The first of her published literary works was Emma; Or, The Unfortunate Attachment: A Sentimental Novel in 1773.

In 1778, Georgiana released the epistolary novel The Sylph. Published anonymously, it had autobiographical elements, centering on a fictional aristocratic bride who had been corrupted, and as "a novel-cum-exposé of [the duchess's] aristocratic cohorts, depicted as libertines, blackmailers, and alcoholics." It has since been speculated that The Sylph may have been written by Sophia Briscoe; a receipt at the British Library suggests that Briscoe was paid for the published work. However, it is thought more likely that Briscoe may have served as an intermediary between the Duchess of Devonshire and her publisher so that the duchess could keep her anonymity. Georgiana is said to have at least privately admitted to her authorship. The Sylph was a success and underwent four reprintings.

Memorandums of the Face of the Country in Switzerland (1799) is often wrongly attributed to Georgiana. It was in fact written by Rowley Lascelles, based on a Swiss tour in 1794.

One more piece was published in the last years of Georgiana's life, The Passage of the Mountain of Saint Gothard, first in an unauthorised version in the 'Morning Chronicle' and 'Morning Post' of 20 and 21 December 1799, then in a privately printed edition in 1800. A poem dedicated to her children, The Passage of the Mountain of Saint Gothard was based on her passage of the Saint Gotthard Pass, with Bess, between 10 and 15 August 1793 on returning to England. The thirty-stanza poem, together with 28 extended notes, was translated into some of the main languages of Western Europe including into French, by Jacques Delille, in 1802; Italian, by Gaetano Polidori, in 1803; and German in 1805. The Passage of the Mountain of Saint Gothard was then reprinted in 1816, after Georgiana's death. Samuel Taylor Coleridge published a glowing response to the poem, 'Ode to Georgiana, Duchess of Devonshire' in the 'Morning Post' on 24 December 1799.

The 5th Duchess of Devonshire was connected to some of the greatest men of letters of her time, and Samuel Johnson, a famed writer of the era, had even paid a visit to the Duke and Duchess, in 1784, at their Chatsworth home.

=== Music ===
Thomas Rowlandson, The Duchess of Devonshire and the Countess of Bessborough, watercolour, 1790

Georgiana was among a few women whose work exemplified English theatre and popular songs of the late-eighteenth century, along with Harriet Abrams, Dorothea Bland, and Mary Ann Wrighten Pownall. Her work includes the vocal composition I Have a Silent Sorrow Here (The favorite song ... in, The Stranger) which was adapted by Mr. Shaw and R.B. Sheridan.

=== Science ===
The Duchess had a small laboratory where she conducted chemistry experiments and studied geology, natural history; she was most passionate for mineralogy. In addition to her scientific curiosity, Georgiana wanted to contribute to her children's education.

Her interest in science arose in part because she was related through marriage to the pneumatic chemist Henry Cavendish whose lab she visited in Clapham. The Duchess frequently engaged in scientific discussions with prominent figures of the era, including Sir Charles Blagden, Professor Henri Struve, Horace-Bénédict de Saussure, Sir Joseph Banks, Sir William Hamilton, Professor Gian Vincenzo Petrini, White Watson, Bryan Higgins, and Benjamin Thompson. Her knowledge of chemistry and mineralogy was regarded as genius; Thomas Beddoes wrote to Erasmus Darwin noting that Georgiana, "manifested a knowledge of modern chemistry superior to that he should have supposed any duchess or lady in England was possessed of". Petrini, Blagden, and Henry Cavendish likewise contacted her mother Countess Spencer remarking upon the Duchess's aptitude, the degree of knowledge she acquired, and her extraordinary observations in the field of mineralogy. In pursuit of her interest, she hiked to the summit of Mount Vesuvius to observe and study the active crater and later began the Devonshire Mineral Collection at Chatsworth (the main seat of the dukes of Devonshire).

The Duchess played a key role, with Thomas Beddoes, in formulating the idea of establishing the Pneumatic Institution in Bristol. Her efforts to establish the Pneumatic Institute, which advanced the study of factitious airs, is an important event that provided a framework for modern anesthesia as well as modern biomedical research in gasotransmitters.

=== Gambling ===
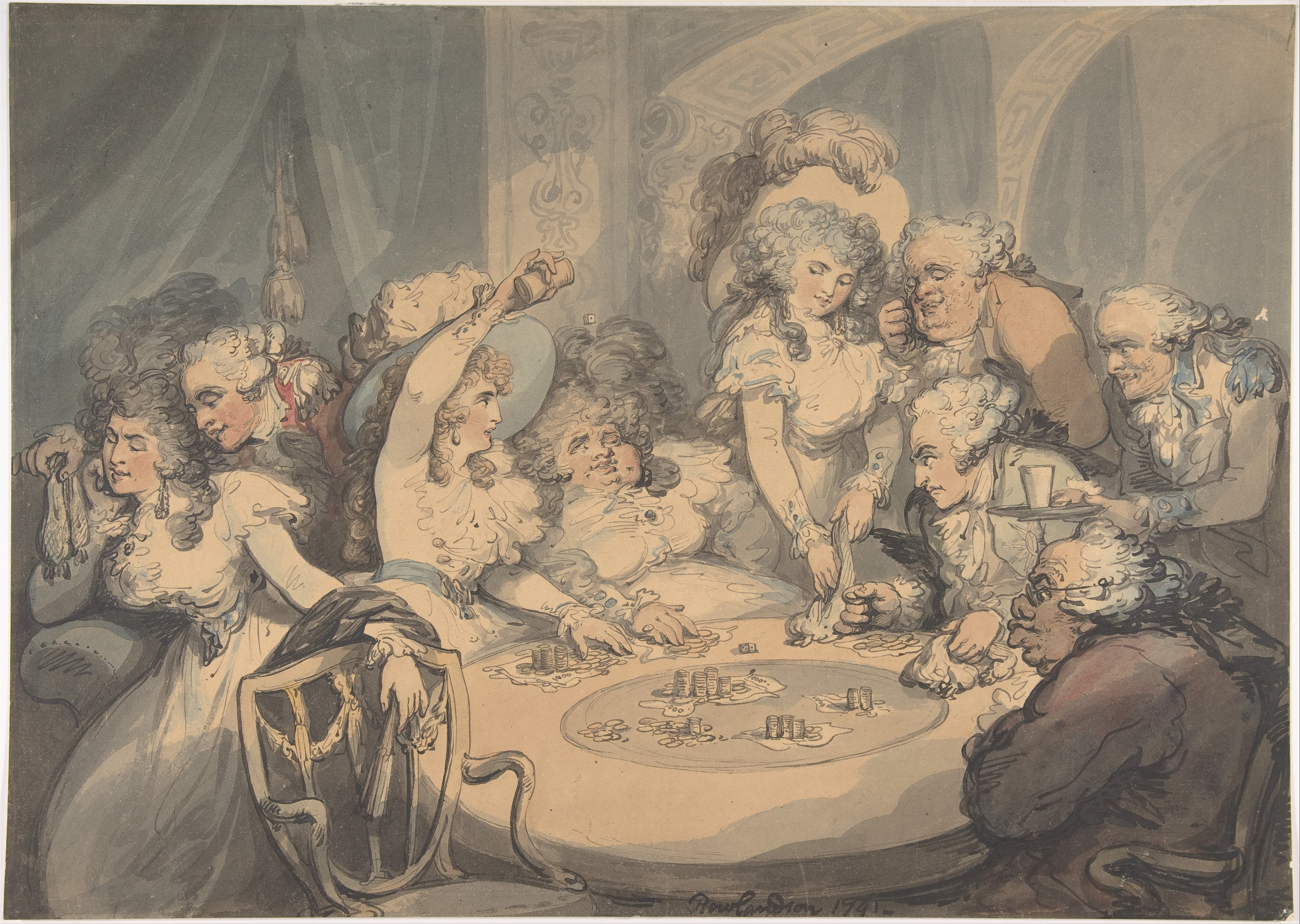
A Gaming Table at Devonshire House, watercolour by Thomas Rowlandson, 1791. Georgiana throws the dice; the Prince of Wales at right with star.

As was common among the aristocracy of her time, Georgiana routinely gambled for leisure and amusement. However, her gaming spiraled into a ruinous addiction made worse by her emotional instability.

In the first years of her marriage, she accumulated debts surpassing the incredibly generous £4,000 that the Duke provided her annually as pin money. Her own mother disapproved and admonished her, unsuccessfully, to break her habit. After she had first incurred over £3,000 in debt, Georgiana implored her parents to give her a loan as she absolutely would not inform her husband of her debts. Her parents acquiesced and told her to inform the Duke; he nevertheless found out beforehand and repaid them.

In 1784, her gambling debt was £100,000 or the equivalent to £13 million today. Georgiana's debt was so astronomical that it became a regular topic, which she loathed, writing: "I am cross, miserable and unhappy. I hate myself. I find my debts much talked of." Her husband almost left her due to her enormous debts.

For the rest of her life, Georgiana continued to amass an immense, ever-escalating debt about which she always lied and tried to keep hidden from her husband (even though he was among the richest men in the land). While she would admit to some amount, it was always less than the total; she could not keep up with even her stated amount, and when her husband gave her money to repay, she instead would gamble that money and get herself further into debt. In confidence, she would ask for loans from the Prince of Wales. At one point, to try to settle some of her debts, she did not shrink from pressing her close friends like Mrs Mary Graham, who gave as much as she could until her husband found out, then the affluent banker Thomas Coutts for more funds.

"a very, very large debt. I never had courage to own it, and try'd to win it at play, by which means it became immense and was grown (I have not the courage to write the sum, but will tell you when I see you)...What had I to offer for the kind of ruin I brought on him (for every year of my life I have cost him immense sums) - a mind he could not trust in, a person faded, and 26 years of folly and indiscretion. And how do you think he has received the avowal—with the utmost generosity, goodness and kindness. His whole care has been that I may not vex myself, and you would think he was the offender not me." -Georgiana to Bess

== Later life and death ==
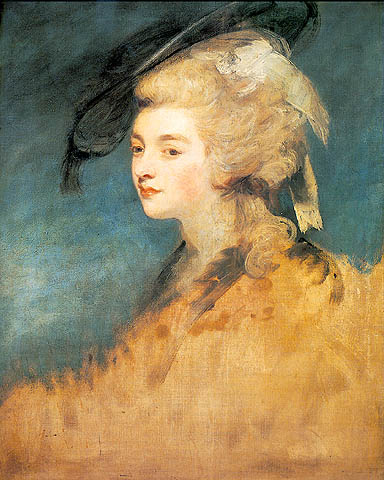
Unfinished portrait by Joshua Reynolds, c. 1780–81

Her absence from English society and exile in France had isolated Georgiana and was a low point for her in every respect; she returned to England, a "changed woman". The Duke began suffering from gout, and she spent her time at his side nursing him. Along with a recent miscarriage, this circumstance with her husband brought about a softening and closeness between the two. She took a positive interest in science, took up writing again (producing two more works), and even continued her political activism while trying to rebuild the Whig party (to no avail before its end). Georgiana also came to meet and become friends with the wife of her former lover, Charles Grey.

In 1796, Georgiana succumbed to a tumour or infection in one eye; after treatment she became blind in that eye with a disfiguring scar on her face. However, "Those scars released her from her fears. All the inhibitions about whether she was beautiful enough or whether she was up to the job left her". In her late thirties, Georgiana was able to regain pre-eminence and enjoyment in open society, although her personal life would continue to be marred by degrees of unhappiness, debt, and decline in health.

During her early forties, the Duchess of Devonshire devoted her time to the coming out of her eldest daughter, Lady Georgiana Dorothy Cavendish. The debutante was presented in 1800, and the Duchess saw her daughter wed Lord Morpeth, the heir apparent of the Earl of Carlisle, in 1801; it was the only time the Duchess of Devonshire saw one of her issue marry.

Georgiana's health continued to decline well into her forties, and her gambling addiction continued. She once reached out to her mother, begging for a sum of 100 pounds and complaining to her of jaundice. While her mother at first believed her daughter was just ill from her gambling, Countess Spencer, as well as those around Georgiana, soon came to realise she was truly sick. She was thought to be suffering from a liver abscess.

Georgiana Cavendish, Duchess of Devonshire, died on 30 March 1806, at 3:30, at the age of 48. She was surrounded by her husband, the 5th Duke of Devonshire; her mother, Countess Spencer; her sister, the Countess of Bessborough; her eldest daughter, Lady Morpeth (who was eight months pregnant); and Lady Elizabeth Foster. They were all said to have been inconsolable over her death. For the first time, the Duke showed moving emotion towards his late wife; a contemporary wrote, "The Duke has been most deeply affected and has shown more feeling than anyone thought possible—indeed every individual in the family are in a dreadful state of affliction." Georgiana's eldest daughter furthermore poured out her feelings, "Oh my beloved, my adored departed mother, are you indeed forever parted from me—Shall I see no more that angelic countenance or that blessed voice—You whom I loved with such tenderness, you who were the ... best of mothers, Adieu—I wanted to strew violets over her dying bed as she strewed sweets over my life, but they would not let me." Her distant cousin, Charles James Fox, for whom she had triumphantly campaigned, was noted to have shed tears. The Prince of Wales himself lamented, "The best natured and the best-bred woman in England is gone." Thousands of the people of London congregated at Piccadilly, where the Cavendish family's town house was located, to mourn her. She was buried in the family vault at All Saints Parish Church (now Derby Cathedral) in Derby.

== Legacy ==
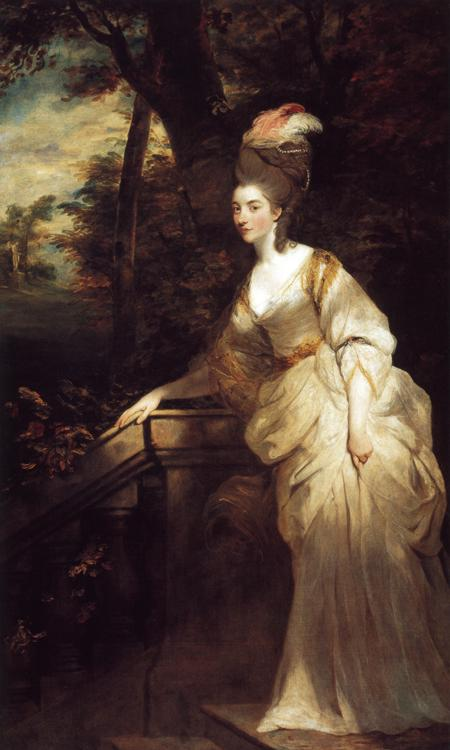
Georgiana, Duchess of Devonshire, by Sir Joshua Reynolds, c. 1775, The Devonshire Collection

The legacy of the life of Georgiana Cavendish, Duchess of Devonshire has remained a topic of study and intrigue in cultural and historical spheres centuries after her death.

Immediately after her death, the Duke of Devonshire discovered the extent of her debts. He soon enough married Lady Elizabeth Foster, who became Duchess of Devonshire as his second wife.

Georgiana's children were discontented with the marriage as they never liked Lady Elizabeth at all (something that caused dismay with their mother when she was alive). When William Cavendish, 5th Duke of Devonshire, died on 29 July 1811, the Marquess of Hartington became 6th Duke of Devonshire. He sought to liquidate his late mother's entire debts. Meanwhile, Lady Elizabeth fought to keep the Cavendish properties to which she was not entitled; the 6th Duke denied her demand that her illegitimate son, Clifford, bear the Cavendish crest along with the 5th Duke of Devonshire. Infuriated, Lady Elizabeth brought up her affair with the 5th Duke of Devonshire by publicly announcing that he had sired her illegitimate children. The 6th Duke of Devonshire finally made an end to it all by paying off Lady Elizabeth and getting rid of her. Nevertheless, Georgiana's children had mutually positive relations with Lady Elizabeth Foster's children for the rest of their lives, having grown up together.

In 1786, Susanna Rowson, who went on to become a bestselling author, dedicated her first published work, Victoria, to the Duchess of Devonshire.

With the topic of liberation at the heart of her policies, the bold involvement of the Duchess of Devonshire in political activism pioneered women's involvement in public, championing their influential participation long before the validation of women's rights and subsequent feminist ideals.

Artwork representing the Duchess of Devonshire by reputable painters of the Georgian era remain, including a 1787 portrait by the famed Thomas Gainsborough which was once thought lost.

Over 1,000 personal letters written by the Duchess of Devonshire remain in existence. Chatsworth, the duke of Devonshire's seat, houses a majority of her letters in its archives.

In modern times, her life's circumstances are seen as an example of female oppression by historical, cultural and legal constructs favouring male interests while denying rights to the female party in a relationship. They have become the subject of scholarly and dramatised works.

=== In literature ===
Thomas Skinner Surr's novel A Winter in London satirised the Duchess as the Duchess of Belgrave, who is several times defrauded, including being tricked into a bribing someone to stop publishing a libellous memoir, and having a friend's jewels stolen by a maid when she tries to pawn them. The Duchess was "dreadfully hurt" by this portrayal, and Elizabeth Wynne Fremantle wrote in her diary that the Duke said it had given her a "death blow"; Samuel Rogers and Sydney Owenson also suggested that the novel hastened her death.

=== Film portrayals ===
- The Divine Lady (1929), portrayed by Evelyn Hall
- Berkeley Square (1933), portrayed by Juliette Compton
- The House in the Square (also titled I'll Never Forget You (US) and Man of Two Worlds) (1951), portrayed by Kathleen Byron
- The Duchess (2008), portrayed by Keira Knightley and directed by Saul Dibb, based on the biography Georgiana, Duchess of Devonshire by Amanda Foreman

=== Opera pasticcio ===
- Georgiana (2019), was commissioned by the Buxton Festival for its 40th anniversary, and was premièred there on 7 July 2019.

== Works by Georgiana Cavendish ==
- Emma; Or, The Unfortunate Attachment: A Sentimental Novel (1773, OCLC 940865941)
- The Sylph (1778)
- The Passage of the Mountain of Saint Gothard (1799)

== Gallery ==
The Duchess of Devonshire by Lady Diana Beauclerk, c. 1779

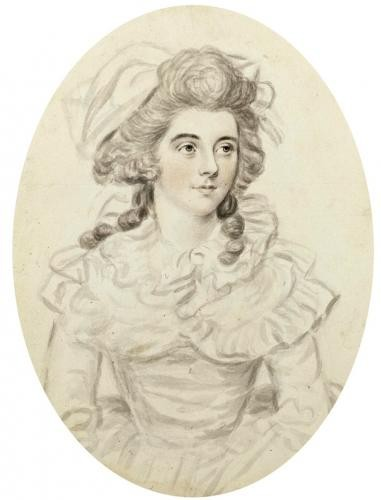
The Duchess of Devonshire by John Downman, c. 1780
