= Macrothemis inacuta =

Conservation status
- Least Concern (IUCN 3.1)

Scientific classification
- Kingdom: Animalia
- Phylum: Arthropoda
- Class: Insecta
- Order: Odonata
- Infraorder: Anisoptera
- Family: Libellulidae
- Genus: Macrothemis
- Species: M. inacuta

Binomial name
- Macrothemis inacuta Calvert, 1898

Species of dragonfly

Macrothemis inacuta, the straw-colored sylph, is a species of skimmer in the dragonfly family Libellulidae. It is found in Central America, North America, and South America.

The IUCN conservation status of Macrothemis inacuta is "LC", least concern, with no immediate threat to the species' survival. The population is stable. The IUCN status was reviewed in 2017.
