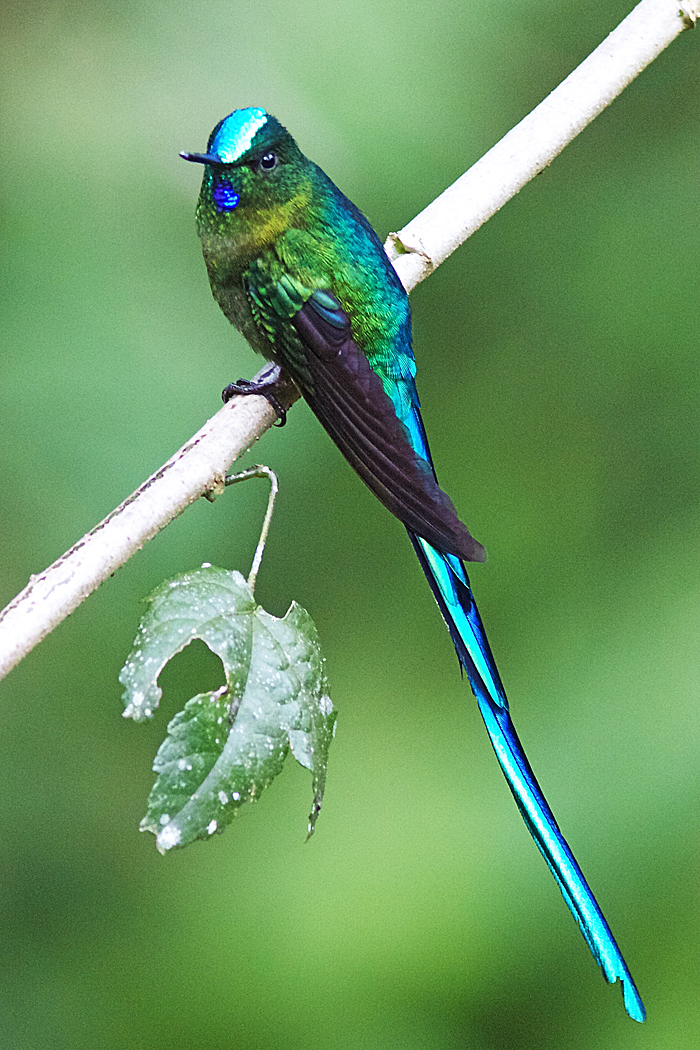
- Male A. k. mocoa, Ecuador
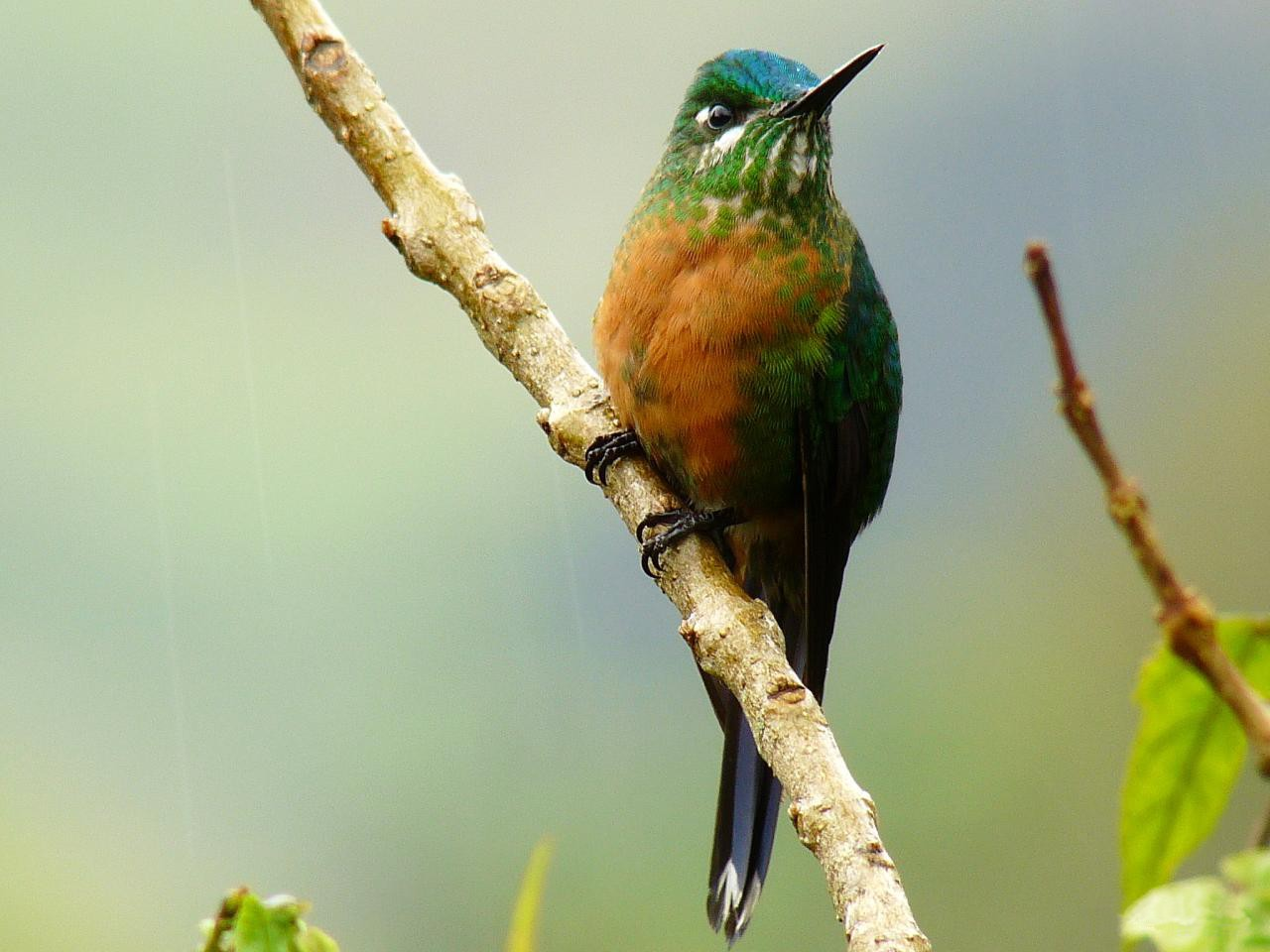
- Female A. k. emmae, Colombia

Conservation status
- Least Concern (IUCN 3.1)
- CITES Appendix II

Scientific classification
- Kingdom: Animalia
- Phylum: Chordata
- Class: Aves
- Clade: Strisores
- Order: Apodiformes
- Family: Trochilidae
- Genus: Aglaiocercus
- Species: A. kingii

Binomial name
- Aglaiocercus kingii (Lesson, 1832)

= Long-tailed sylph =

Species of hummingbirdbird

The long-tailed sylph (Aglaiocercus kingii) is a species of hummingbird in the "coquettes", tribe Lesbiini of subfamily Lesbiinae. It is found in Bolivia, Colombia, Ecuador, Peru, and Venezuela.

== Taxonomy and systematics ==
The taxonomy of genus Aglaiocercus and of the long-tailed sylph in particular are complicated. The genus also includes two other sylphs, the violet-tailed (A. coelestis) and Venezuelan (A. berlepschi), and the three have several times been suggested to be either one or two species. Several additional species have been proposed for inclusion but they have almost conclusively been shown to be hybrids with kingii or one of the other sylphs. Since at least the early 2000s taxonomists have settled on the three-species treatment.

The long-tailed sylph has these six accepted subspecies. However, early in the 20th century, caudatus and mocoa were treated by some authors as separate species.

- A. k. margarethae Heine (1863)
- A. k. caudatus Berlepsch (1893)
- A. k. emmae Berlepsch (1893)
- A. k. kingii Lesson (1832)
- A. k. mocoa Delattre & Bourcier (1846)
- A. k. smaragdinus Gould (1846)

== Description ==
The male long-tailed sylphs are 16 to 19 cm (6.3 to 7.5 in) long including the 12 cm (4.7 in) outer tail feathers, and weigh 5 to 6 g (0.18 to 0.21 oz). Females are 9.7 to 11.7 cm (3.8 to 4.6 in) long and weigh 4.5 to 4.7 g (0.16 to 0.17 oz). All subspecies have a short black bill. Males of the nominate subspecies A. k. kingii have a shining emerald green crown, metallic bronzy green upperparts, duller green underparts with an olive cast, and a blue or violet throat. The inner tail feathers are very short and the outer ones very long. (Despite the species' English name, its tail is not noticeably longer than those of the other sylphs.) The tail's upper surface is iridescent blue, green, and violet and the underside bluish black. Nominate females' upperparts are similar to the males'. Their tail is short and somewhat forked, with dark blue outer feathers broadly tipped with white. The head is metallic green with a white malar stripe and a white to buffy throat with green speckles. The underparts are cinnamon.

Males of subspecies A. k. margarethae have paler green upperparts than the nominate; females are similar to the nominate. A. k. caudatus does not have the nominate's blue throat and its females are also similar to the nominate. A. k. emmae has a somewhat longer bill than the nominate. Males are a paler and duller green and have a bright green throat; females have more green spots on a white throat. A. k. mocoa's upperparts are a shinier green than the nominate and a sapphire blue to purple throat. The female is similar to the nominate. A. k. smaragdinus has a shorter tail than the nominate and a greenish blue throat. The female has bronzy green upperparts, a more bluish green crown than the nominate, and a chestnut wash on the back.

== Distribution and habitat ==
The subspecies of long-tailed sylph are found thus:

- A. k. margarethae, north central and coastal Venezuela
- A. k. caudatus, in western Venezuela's Serranía del Perijá and the Andes into northern Colombia
- A. k. emmae, the northern Central and southern Western Andes of Colombia south into northwestern Ecuador
- A. k. kingii, the Eastern Andes of Colombia
- A. k. mocoa, the southern Central Andes of Colombia through Ecuador into northern Peru
- A. k. smaragdinus, the eastern Andes of Peru south into west-central Bolivia

The long-tailed sylph inhabits generally open landscapes like scrublands, clearings and edges of forest, gardens, secondary forest, and high-elevation grassland. In elevation it ranges between 900 and 3,000 m (3,000 and 9,800 ft).

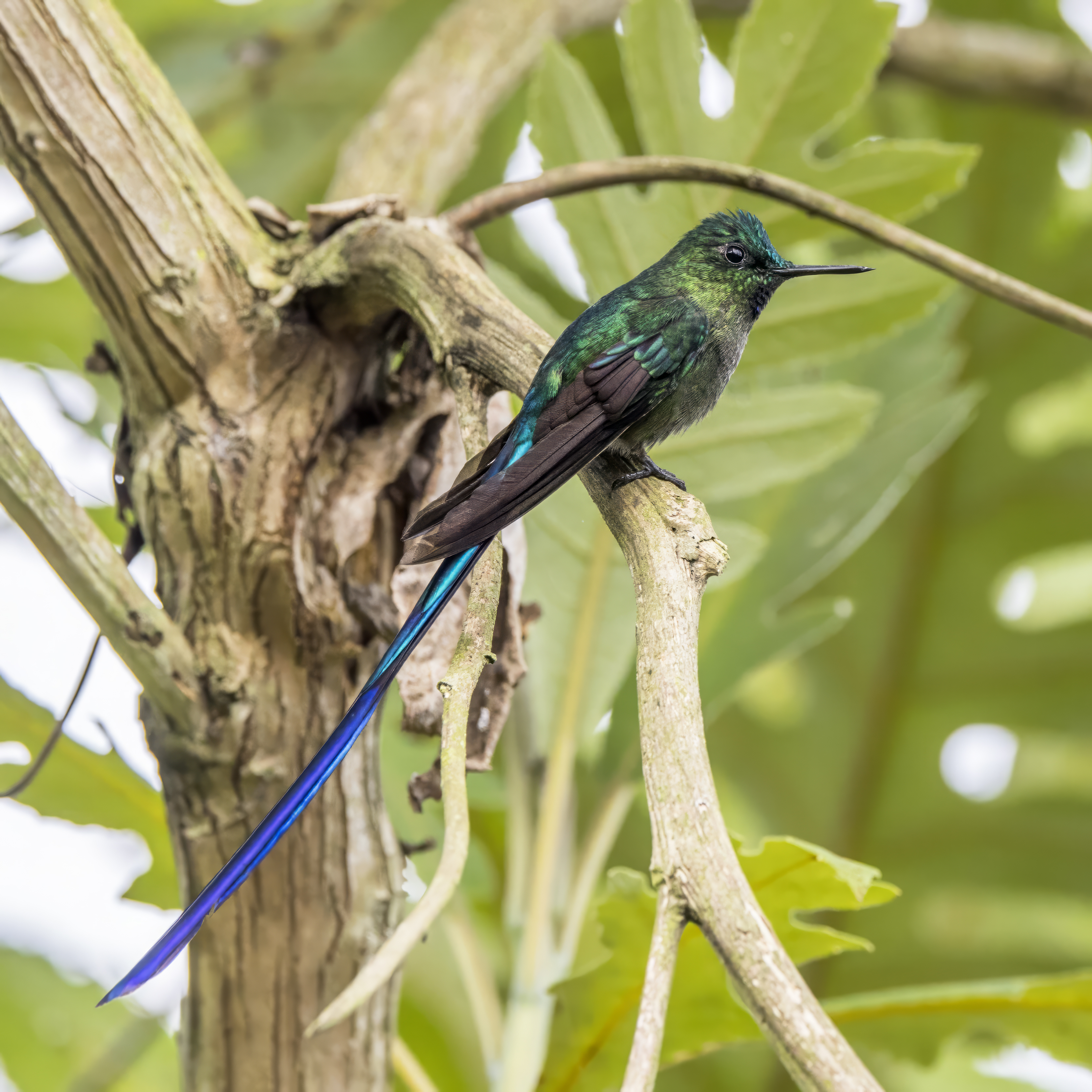
A. k. kingii, Colombia

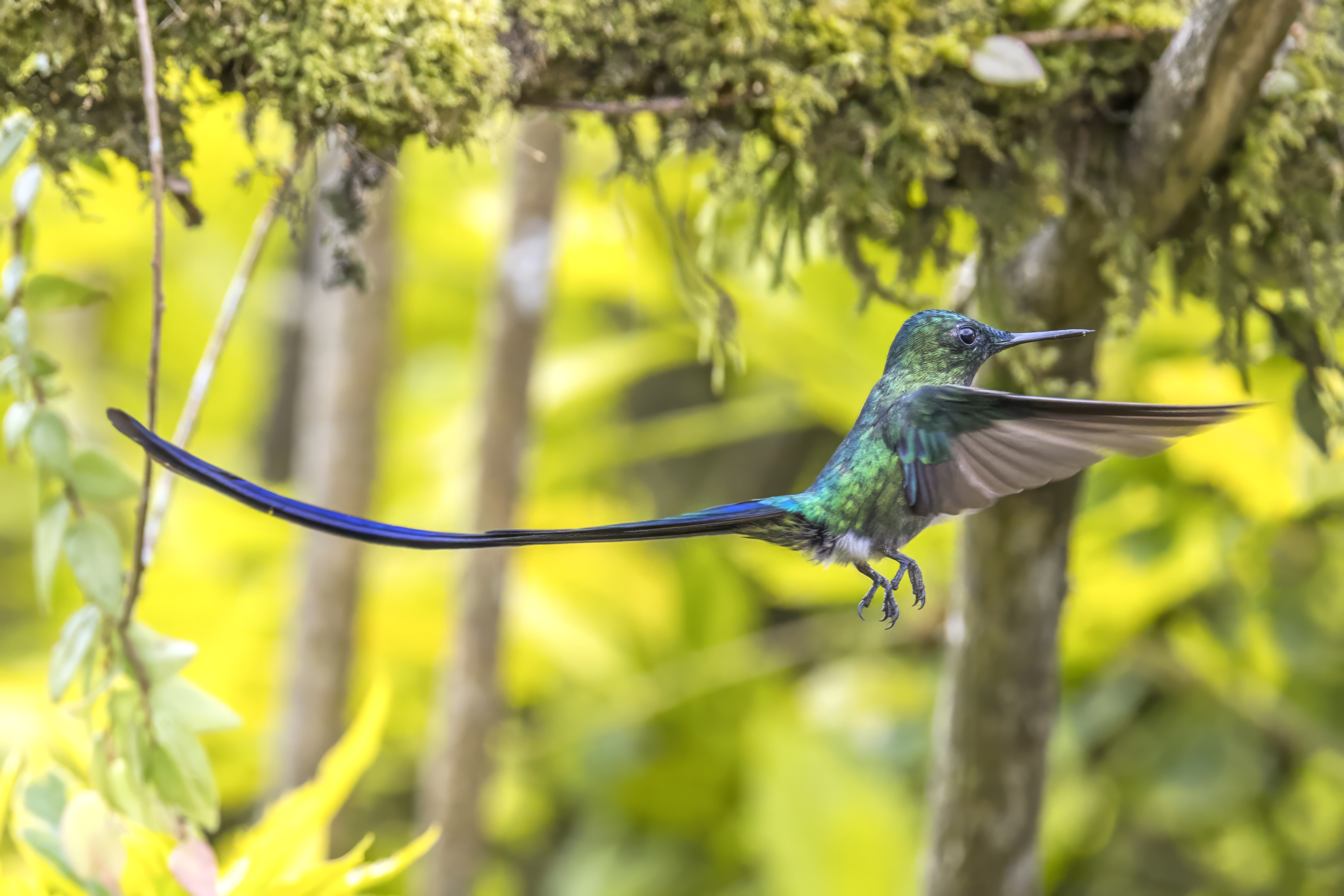
A. k. kingii, Colombia

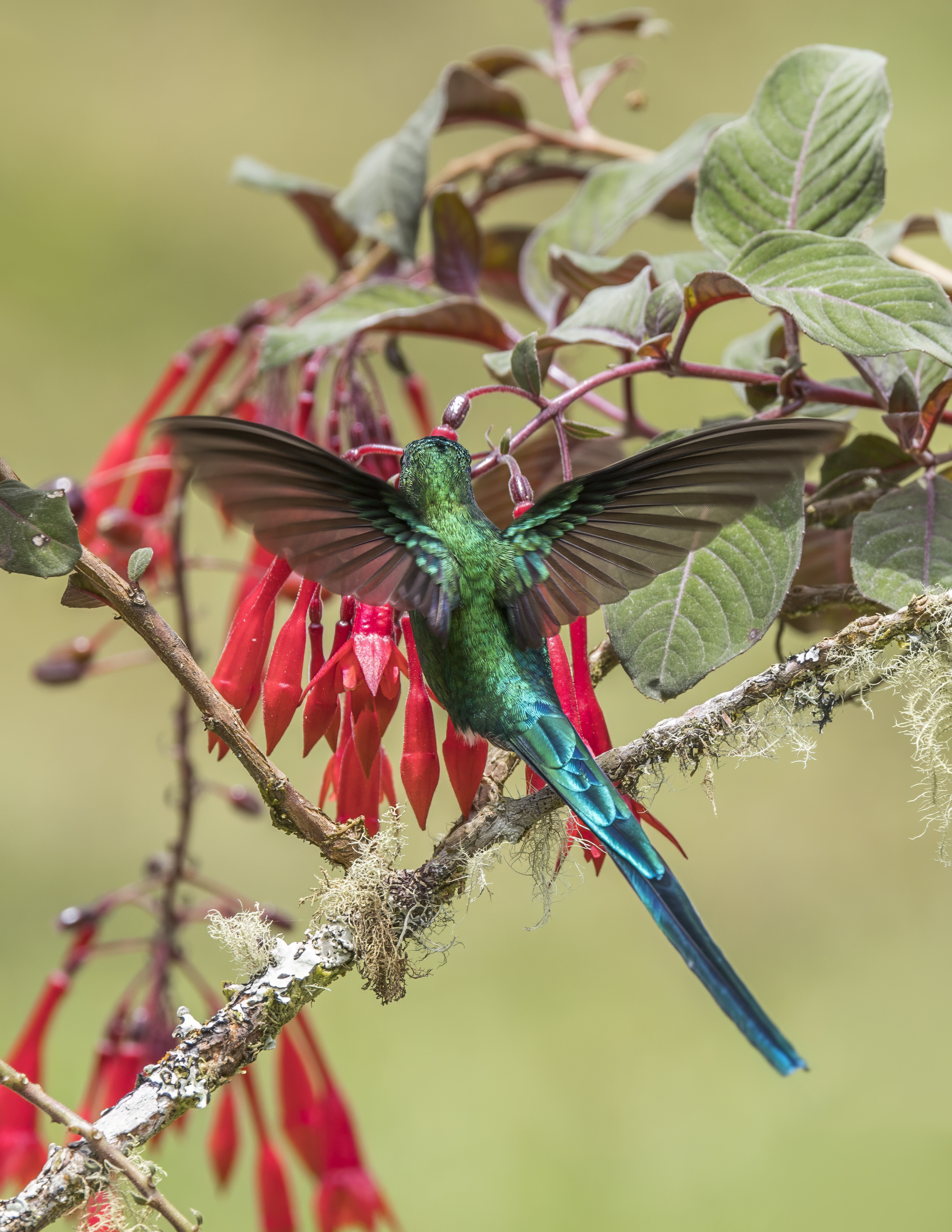
A. k. emmae, Colombia

== Behavior ==
=== Movement ===
The long-tailed sylph has a complex movement pattern. Populations in the Andes make seasonal movements between lower and higher elevations. A. k. caudatus is thought to migrate between Venezuela and Colombia. On the Pacific side of southwestern Colombia, A. k. emmae apparently is present only in the wet season and is replaced by the violet-tailed sylph between January and April.

=== Feeding ===
The long-tailed sylph's diet is nectar and insects. It feeds on nectar in several ways. It uses trap-lining around a circuit of flowering plants but also will defend specific feeding territories. It usually hovers at flowers to feed but sometimes clings to them and also "robs" nectar by piercing the base of a flower. It catches insects by hawking from a perch. At lower elevations it feeds mostly in the treetops, and lower to the ground at elfin forest and high-elevation grassland.

=== Breeding ===
The long-tailed sylph's breeding season is known to span February to October but the species is believed to breed at any time of year. Males build the nest, a bulky dome of moss and plant fibers with a side entrance. It is attached to a branch or twig where hidden by leaves. The female incubates the two white eggs for 15 to 17 days; fledging occurs 21 to 24 days after hatch.

=== Vocalization ===
The long-tailed sylph's apparent song is "a continuous series of buzzy notes 'bzzt...bzzt...bzzt...'." Its calls include "a repeated, short, buzzy or raspy 'dzzrt'...a more drawn-out, higher-pitched 'bzzeeew' [and] a thin high-pitched rising twittering."

== Status ==
The IUCN has assessed the long-tailed sylph as being of Least Concern. It has a very large range, but its population size is not known and is believed to be decreasing. It is common to abundant in much of its range and occurs in several protected areas. However, habitat clearing for cattle raising in Colombia and Ecuador is a potential threat.
