= Macrothemis imitans =

Conservation status
- Least Concern (IUCN 3.1)

Scientific classification
- Kingdom: Animalia
- Phylum: Arthropoda
- Class: Insecta
- Order: Odonata
- Infraorder: Anisoptera
- Family: Libellulidae
- Genus: Macrothemis
- Species: M. imitans

Binomial name
- Macrothemis imitans Karsch, 1890

Species of dragonfly

Macrothemis imitans, the ivory-striped sylph, is a species of skimmer in the dragonfly family Libellulidae. It is found in Central America, North America, and South America.

The IUCN conservation status of Macrothemis imitans is "LC", least concern, with no immediate threat to the species' survival. The population is stable. The IUCN status was reviewed in 2016.

== Subspecies ==
These two subspecies belong to the species Macrothemis imitans:

- Macrothemis imitans imitans Karsch, 1890
- Macrothemis imitans leucozona Ris, 1913
