= The Sylph =

18th century English novel by Georgiana Cavendish

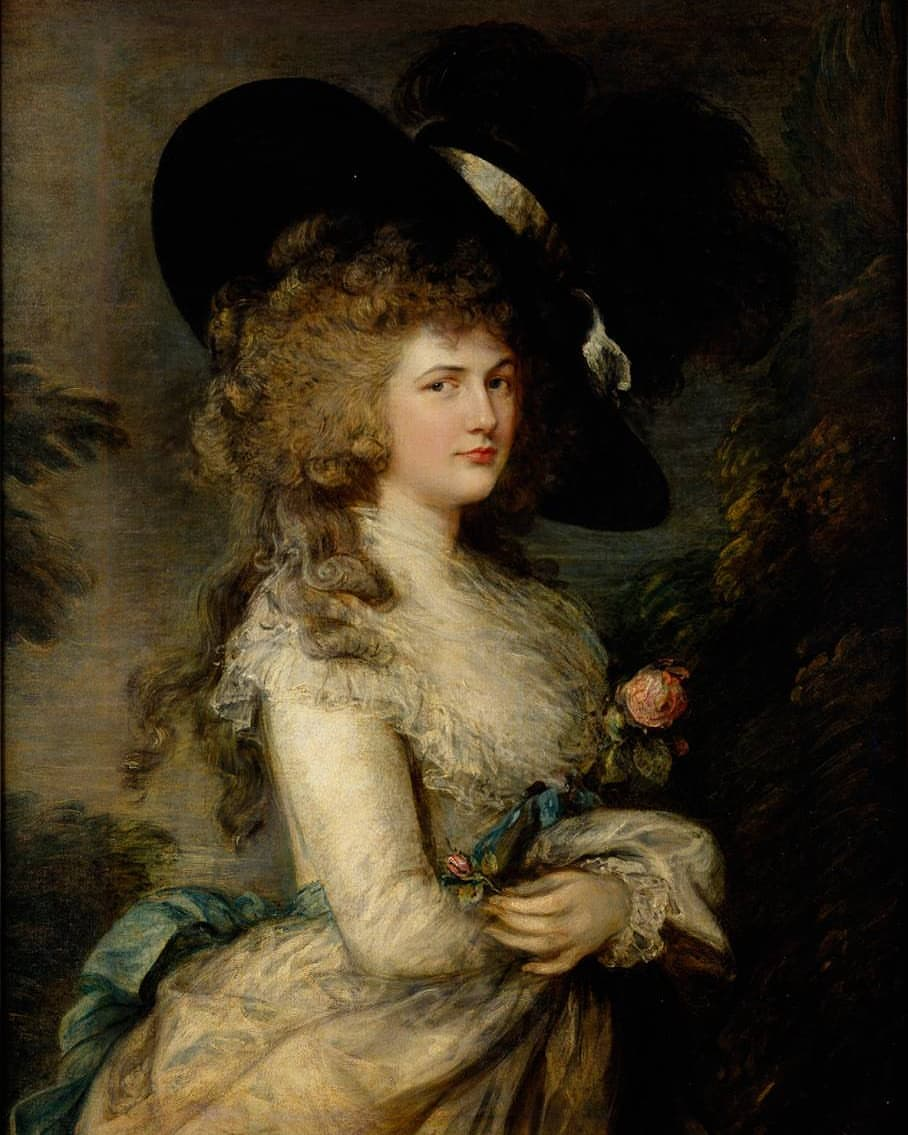
Georgiana Cavendish, Duchess of Devonshire, the novel's author

The Sylph is a 1779 novel by Georgiana Cavendish, Duchess of Devonshire. It was her second printed work and was published anonymously under the name 'A Young Lady'.

The Sylph is an epistolary novel. It centres on Julia Grenville, a Welsh beauty and ingenue (with whom there are parallels with Cavendish herself) who leaves her idyllic rustic life to marry a rich member of the aristocracy. Over the course of time she uncovers the fact that her husband is a rake and a libertine, lavishing his wealth on gambling and mistresses. The letters are chiefly written to her sisters and provide narrative detail about Julia's life in London and her disillusionment with the mores of the inhabitants of the city as well as her miscarriage. We also discover that she has a long-term admirer, Henry Woodley, that she has growing affections for another man (the Baron Ton-hausen) and also that she has a mysterious and enigmatic protector and guardian, who is the 'sylph' of the title. The sylph helps provide advice to Julia on the way to negotiate the labyrinth of metropolitan high society, appearing in the work only in the double fictional form of a masquerade.

Eventually Julia's husband commits suicide as a result of his hefty gambling debts and Julia returns to her family in Wales.

The book's epigraph is taken from The Rape of the Lock by Alexander Pope and was influenced by The Sylph, a one-act play by Germain-François Poullain de Saint-Foix (1771).

There has been some controversy over the authorship of the work, with some claims having been made that it was not written by Cavendish but was instead produced by Sophia Briscoe. The question of gambling debts is an interesting one, since at her death Cavendish herself left an extremely large bill behind based on her own gambling activity.
