= Emilie von Berlepsch =

German author

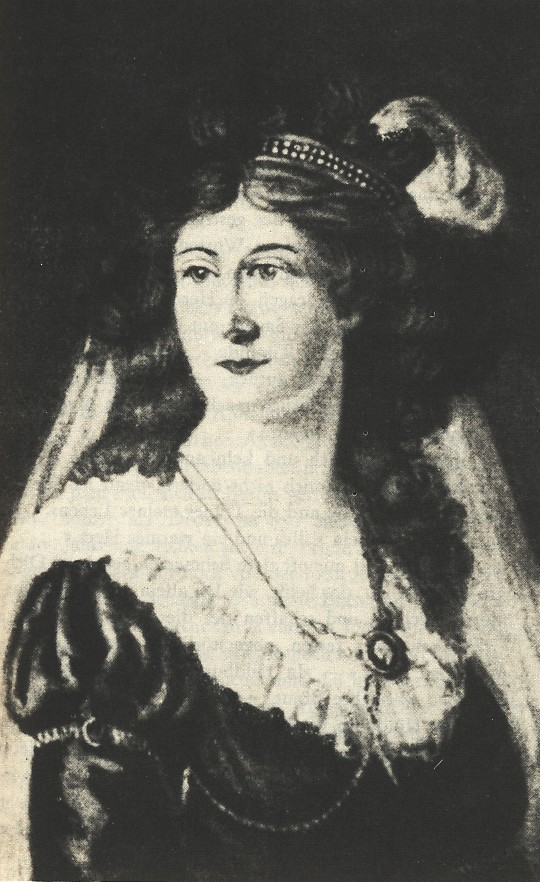
- Born: Dorothea Friderika Aemilia von Oppel; 26 November 1755; Gotha
- Died: 27 July 1830 (aged 74); Lauenburg
- Known for: Writing about women's rights

Dorothea Friderika Aemilia von Berlepsch (née von Oppel; 26 November 1755 – 27 July 1830), known as Emilie von Berlepsch, was a German traveller and author. She is regarded as an early writer about women's rights in Germany.

== Life ==
Berlepsch was born in Gotha in 1755. Her parents were Carl Georg August von Oppel and his wife Amalie. When her father died, her mother remarried, and she was looked after by an uncle and given a good private education. She published some poetry and then a book of protest because Switzerland was invaded in 1798 by the French.

She married Friedrich Ludwig von Berlepsch when she was sixteen and had three children with him. The marriage ended in divorce in 1787. Her ex-husband married Anna Dorothea Helene Siever, who had been her maid, after the divorce. By this time Berlepsch's writing was being regarded as more than amateur and aspiring to art. She is said to have "set her cap", unsuccessfully, at Johann Wolfgang von Goethe.

She left Switzerland in protest at the French invasion of the country and swore never to set foot in it again while it was occupied. She went to visit Scotland in 1799 and 1800. She had already met the polyglot Reverend James Macdonald in Germany who was acquainted with C. M. Wieland and J. G. Herder. Macdonald was an enthusiast for improving relations between Scotland and Germany. The vicar in Fife became Berlepsch's chosen host. He looked after her and took her on tours of Scotland; some of her time was spent in Edinburgh and some in the Highlands. Berlepsch wrote a four volume account titled Caledonia, in German, which described Scotland, including the remote highlands, and discussed women writers publishing in English.

Macdonald's affection for Berlepsch did not extend to marriage, and Berlepsch was disappointed. She returned to Germany and married again. Her second marriage was to August Heinrich Harmes who was not of noble birth. They lived at Lake Zurich until 1817.

== Writing ==
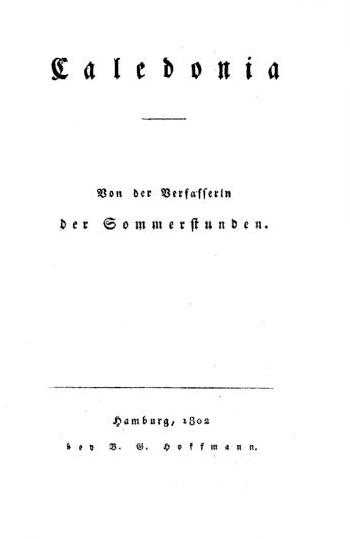
The title-page of Caledonia, Hamburg, 1802

Berlepsch's book Caledonia included early translations and reviews of Robert Burns. Her translations are credited with encouraging an acceptance and appreciation of Burns's work. There were numerous reviews in German newspapers and journals after Berlepsch's translations were published.

In her writing Berlepsch deals particularly with the subject of women's rights, a topic she first raised in 1791 in a journal article innocuously titled "Some Characteristics and Principles Necessary for Happiness in Marriage," in which she ponders the pervasiveness of misogyny and the costs of women's conventional submissiveness. She described herself as "fighting against the prejudice that wants to grant women neither a will of their own nor the courage to express it". She talks about routine misogyny that cannot be handled by submissiveness. She argues that women are given neither rights nor the opportunity to complain; women are not, by their nature, prisoners of their emotions and men are not natural tyrants. She wanted an end to misogyny but she believed that men retained supremacy. She discussed various writers for German readers including particularly Mary Wollstonecraft. She notes her own role in raising women's issues for the first time in German.

Berlepsch died in Lauenburg in 1830.

== Published works ==
Emilie von Berlepsch's published works as cited by An Encyclopedia of Continental Women Writers.

- Sammlung Kleiner Schriften und Poesian Erster Theil [Collection of Short prose and Poems., pt. 1], 1787.
- "Einige zum Glück der Ehe nothwendige Eigenschaften und Grundsätze" [Some Characteristics and Principles Necessary for Happiness in Marriage], in Der Teutsche Merkur 1791.
- Sommerstunden [Summer Hours], 1794.
- Einige Bemerkungen zur richtigen Beurtheilung der erzwungen Schwitzer-Revolution und Mallet du Pans Geschichte derselben [Some Remarks About the Correct Evaluation of the Forced Swiss Revolution and of mallet du Pan's History of It], 1799.
- Caledonia, 4 volumes, 1802–1804.
