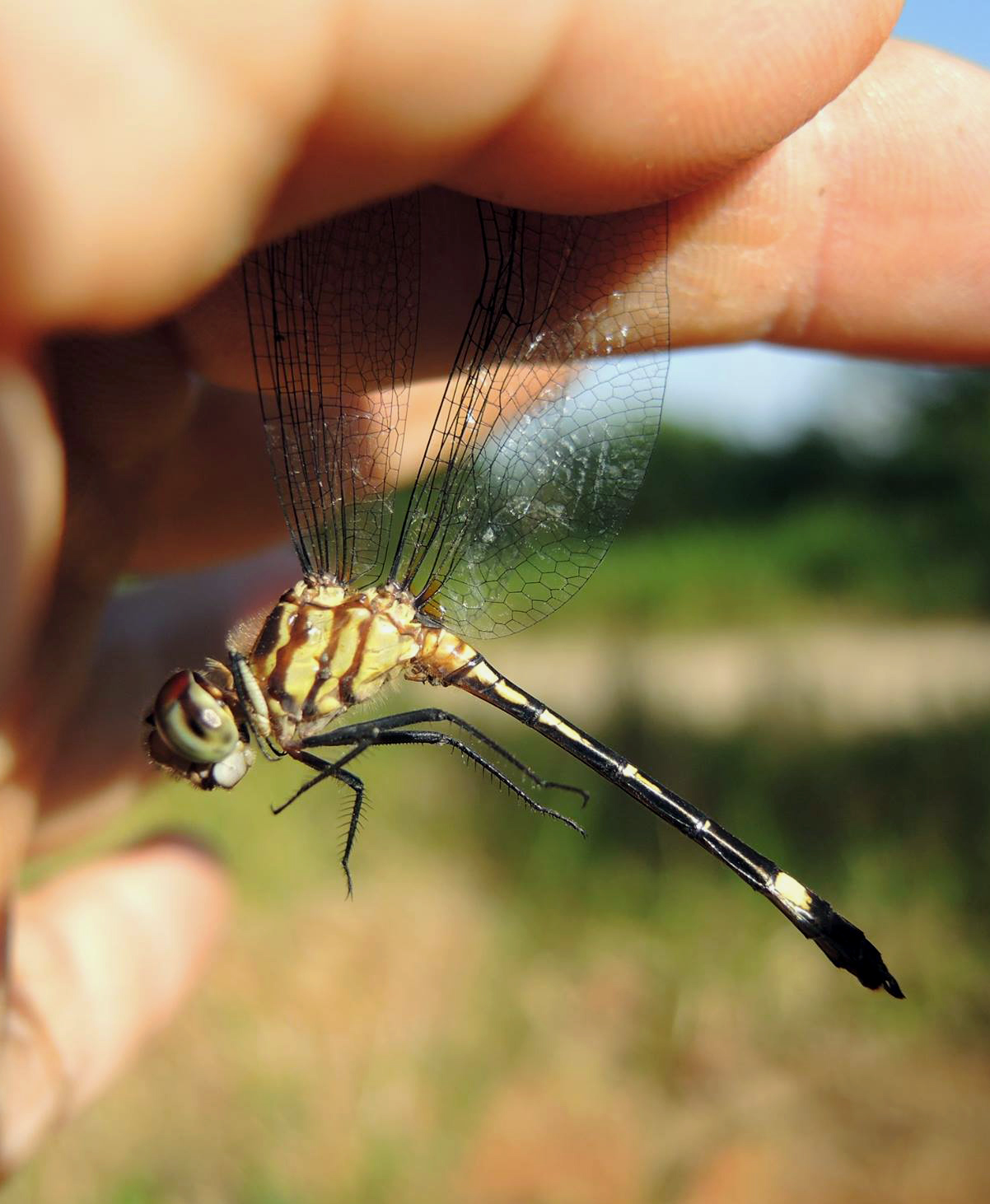

Scientific classification
- Kingdom: Animalia
- Phylum: Arthropoda
- Class: Insecta
- Order: Odonata
- Infraorder: Anisoptera
- Family: Libellulidae
- Subfamily: Trithemistinae
- Genus: Macrothemis; Hagen, 1868

= Macrothemis =

Genus of dragonflies

Macrothemis is a genus of dragonfly in the family Libellulidae, also known as Sylphs. It contains the following species:

- Macrothemis absimilis Costa, 1991
- Macrothemis aurimaculata Donnelly, 1984
- Macrothemis belliata Belle, 1987
- Macrothemis brevidens Belle, 1983
- Macrothemis calliste (Ris, 1913)
- Macrothemis capitata Calvert, 1909
- Macrothemis celeno (Selys in Sagra, 1857) - Antillean Sylph
- Macrothemis cynthia Ris, 1913
- Macrothemis declivata Calvert, 1909
- Macrothemis delia Ris, 1913
- Macrothemis extensa Ris, 1913
- Macrothemis fallax May, 1998
- Macrothemis flavescens (Kirby, 1897)
- Macrothemis griseofrons Calvert, 1909
- Macrothemis guarauno Rácenis, 1957
- Macrothemis hahneli Ris, 1913
- Macrothemis hemichlora (Burmeister, 1839)
- Macrothemis heteronycha (Calvert, 1909)
- Macrothemis hosanai Santos, 1967
- Macrothemis idalia Ris, 1919
- Macrothemis imitans Karsch, 1890 - Ivory-striped Sylph
- Macrothemis inacuta Calvert, 1898 - Straw-colored Sylph
- Macrothemis inequiunguis Calvert, 1895 - Jade-striped Sylph
- Macrothemis lauriana Ris, 1913
- Macrothemis ludia Belle, 1987
- Macrothemis lutea Calvert, 1909
- Macrothemis marmorata Hagen, 1868
- Macrothemis meurgeyi Daigle, 2007
- Macrothemis mortoni Ris, 1913
- Macrothemis musiva Calvert, 1898
- Macrothemis newtoni Costa, 1990
- Macrothemis nobilis Rácenis, 1957
- Macrothemis pleurosticta (Burmeister, 1839)
- Macrothemis polyneura Ris, 1913
- Macrothemis proterva Belle, 1987
- Macrothemis pseudimitans Calvert, 1898 - White-tailed Sylph
- Macrothemis rochai Navás, 1918
- Macrothemis rupicola Rácenis, 1957
- Macrothemis taurepan De Marmels, 2008
- Macrothemis tenuis Hagen, 1868
- Macrothemis tessellata (Burmeister, 1839)
- Macrothemis ultima González, 1992
- Macrothemis valida (Navás, 1916)
