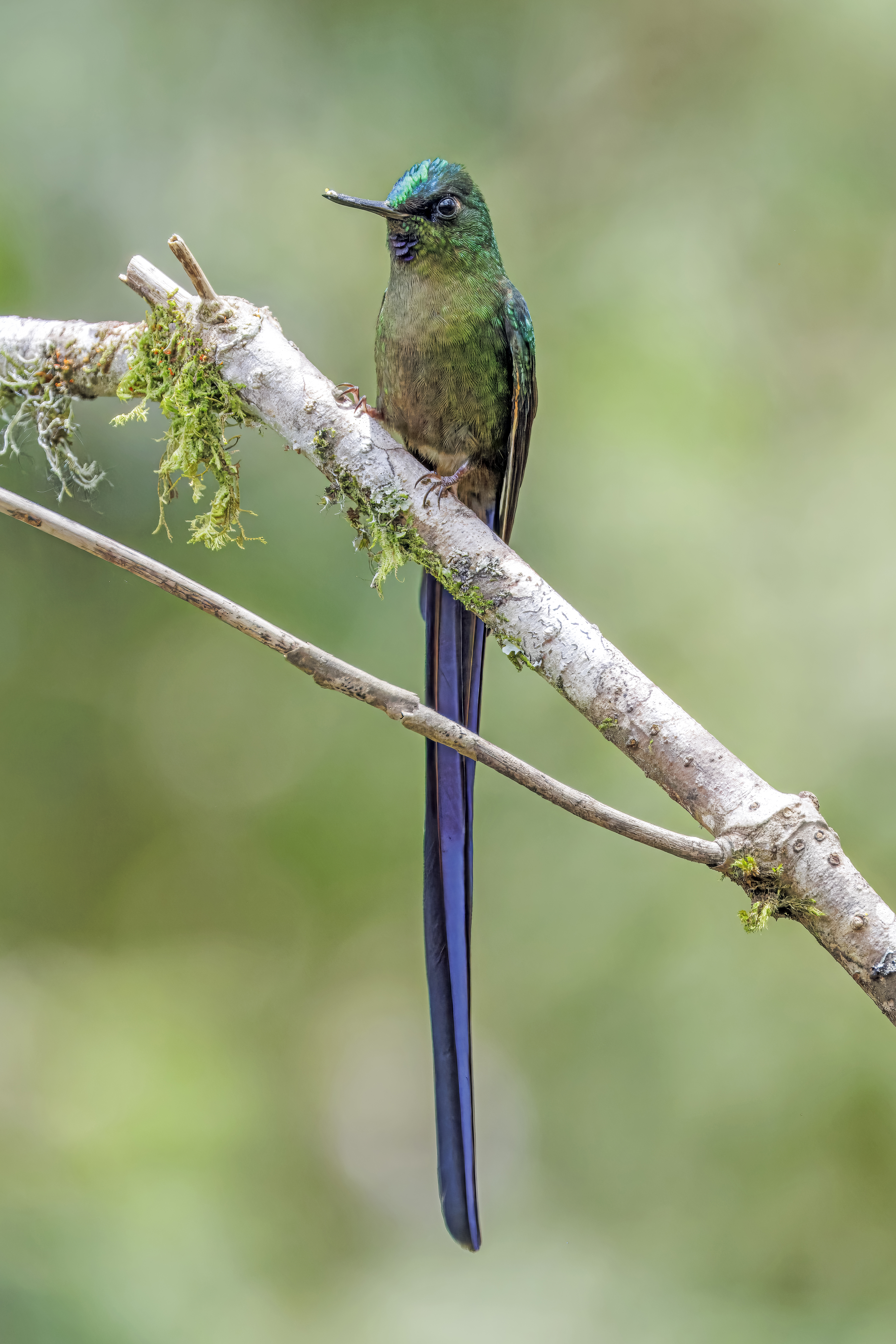
- male in NW Ecuador
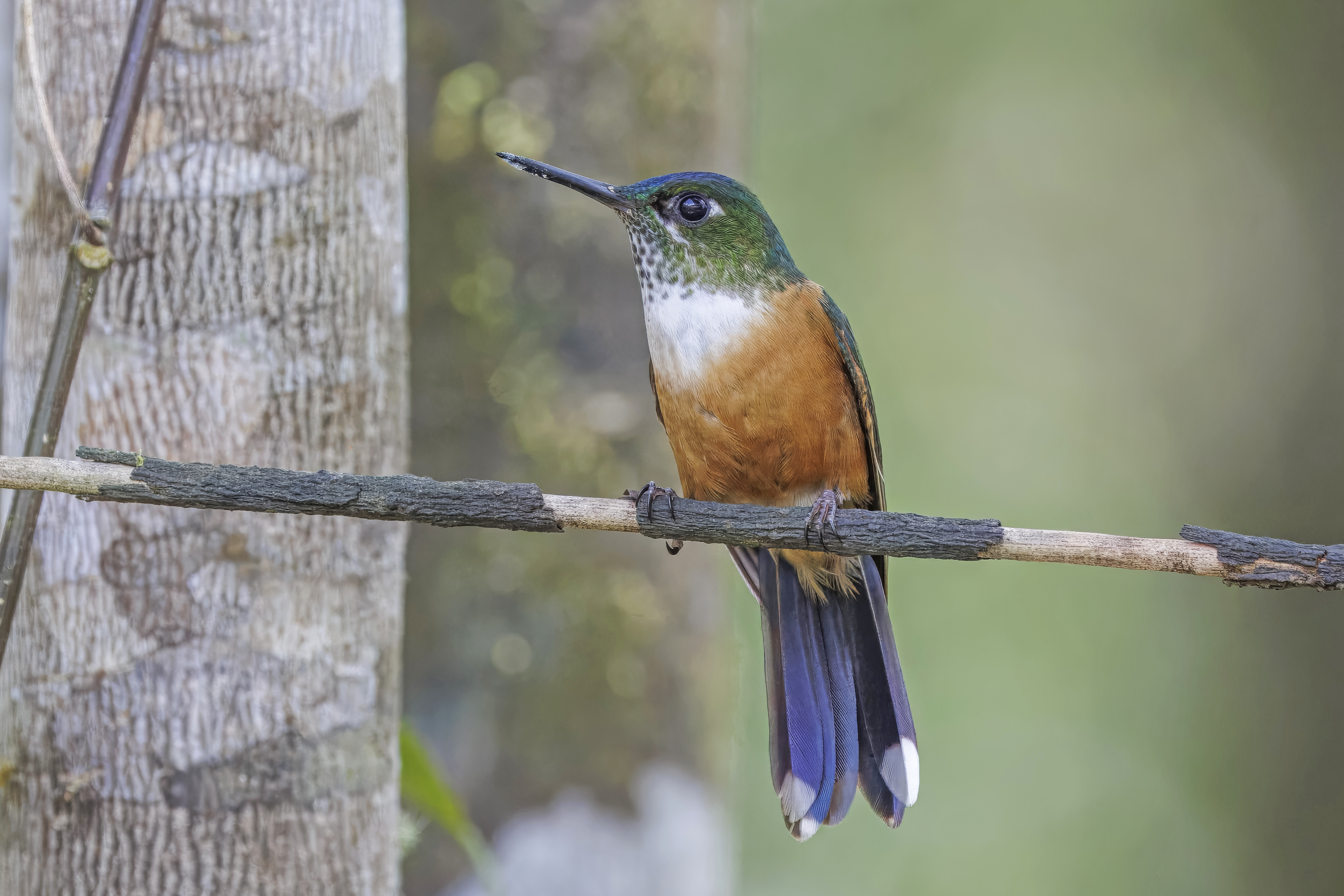
- female both in Ecuador

Conservation status
- Least Concern (IUCN 3.1)
- CITES Appendix II

Scientific classification
- Kingdom: Animalia
- Phylum: Chordata
- Class: Aves
- Order: Apodiformes
- Family: Trochilidae
- Genus: Aglaiocercus
- Species: A. coelestis

Binomial name
- Aglaiocercus coelestis (Gould, 1861)

= Violet-tailed sylph =

Species of hummingbird

The violet-tailed sylph (Aglaiocercus coelestis) is a species of hummingbird in the "coquettes", tribe Lesbiini of subfamily Lesbiinae. It is found in Colombia and Ecuador.

== Taxonomy and systematics ==
The taxonomy of genus Aglaiocercus and of the violet-tailed sylph in particular are complicated. The genus also includes two other sylphs, the long-tailed (A. kingii) and Venezuelan (A. berlepschi), and the three have several times been suggested to be either one species, or two with the violet-tailed being a subspecies of long-tailed. Several additional species have been proposed for inclusion but they have almost conclusively been shown to be hybrids with kingii or one of the other sylphs. Since at least the early 2000s taxonomists have settled on the three-species treatment. The violet-tailed sylph has two subspecies, the nominate A. c. coelestis and A. c. aethereus.

== Description ==
The male long-tailed sylphs are 18 to 21 cm (7.1 to 8.3 in) long including the 10 to 15 cm (3.9 to 5.9 in) outer tail feathers. Females are 9.5 to 9.7 cm (3.7 to 3.8 in) long. The species weighs 4.6 to 5.2 g (0.16 to 0.18 oz). Both subspecies have a short black bill. Males of the nominate subspecies have a shining green crown and back, that becomes violet-blue on the rump. They have a buffy spot behind the eye, a violet-blue gorget, and green underparts. The inner tail feathers are short and the outer ones very long, and the feathers are iridescent metallic violet with blue tips. Nominate females have a glittering blue crown and a whitish spot behind the eye; otherwise their upperparts are similar to the male's. Their throat is white with green spots and is separated by a white band from the cinnamon-rufous underparts. Their tail is short and unforked, bluish green with white tips on the outer feathers. Juveniles have dull green upperparts, buffy green underparts, and buffy fringes on the head feathers.

Males of subspecies A. c. aethereus have a green gorget and females a lightly spotted throat but both are otherwise essentially the same as the nominate.

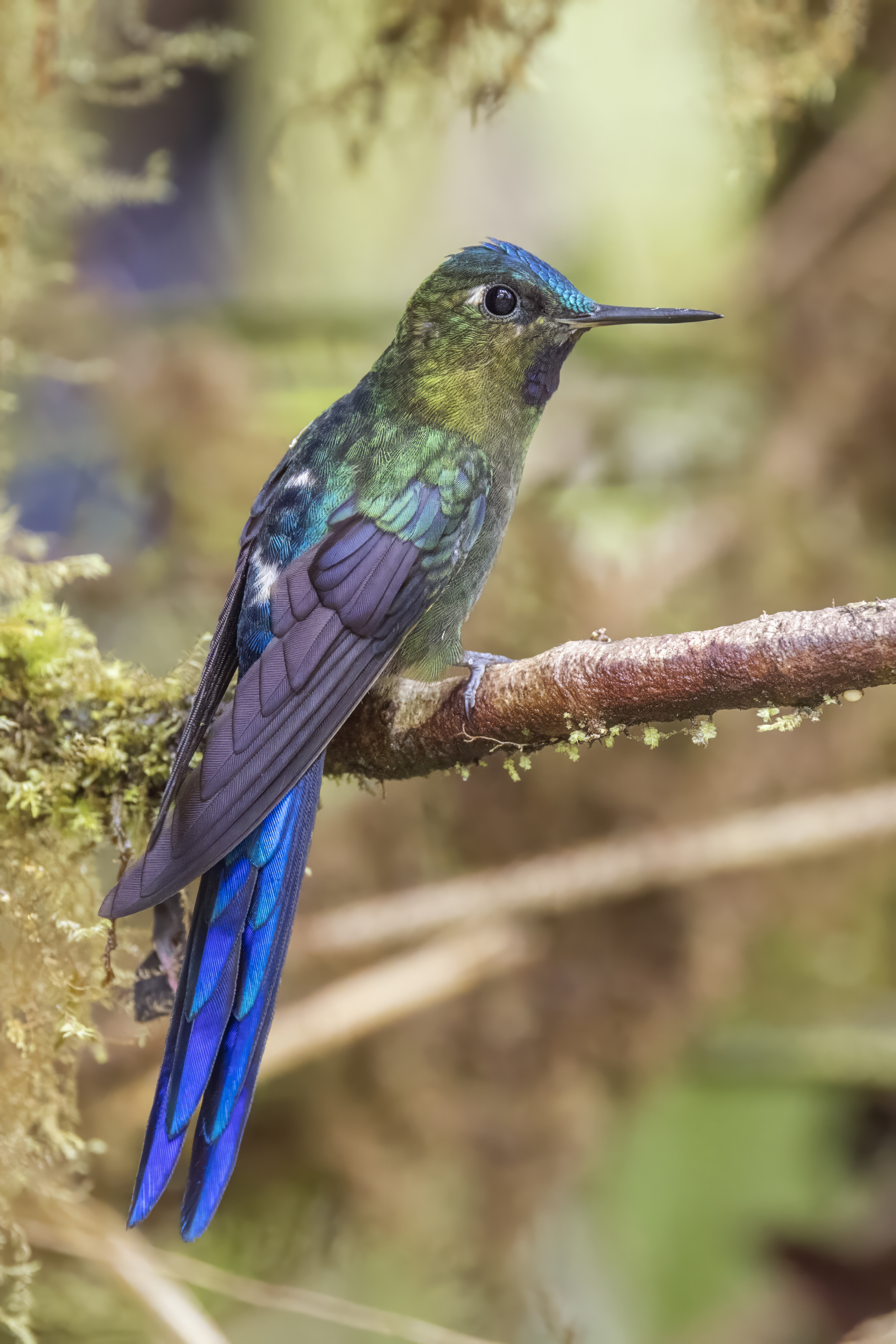
immature male

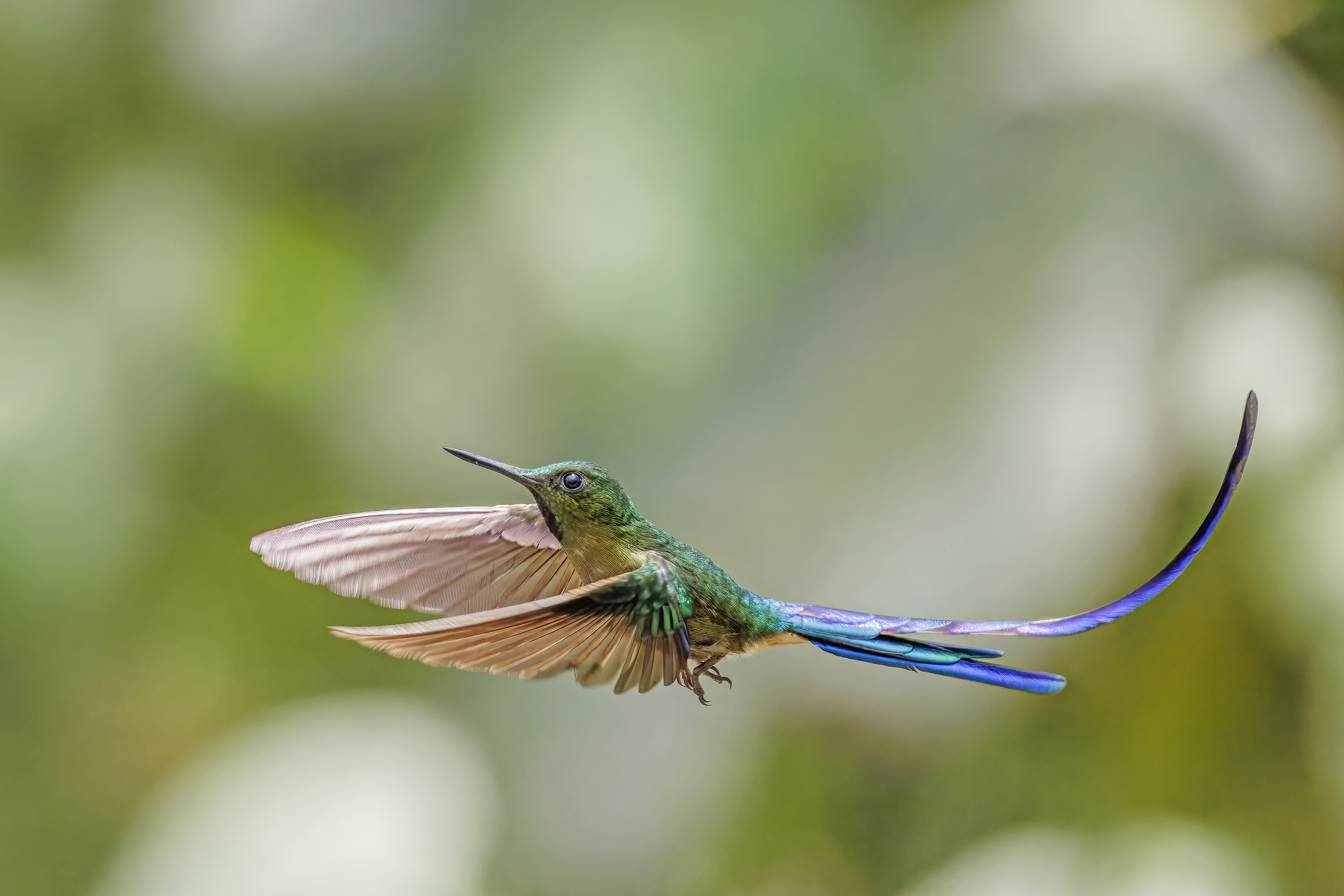
male

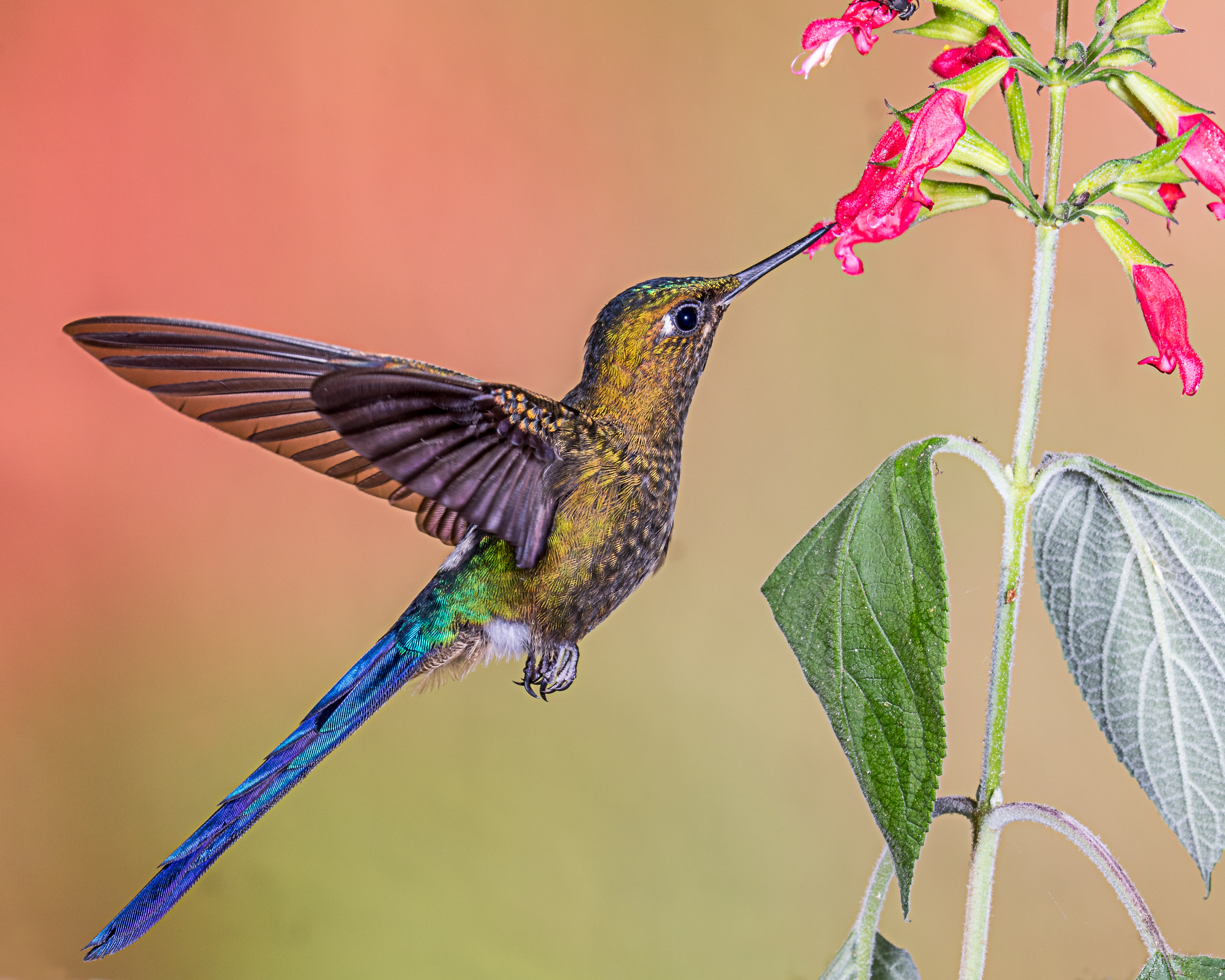
male feeding

== Distribution and habitat ==
The nominate subspecies of violet-tailed sylph is found from the Pacific slope of Colombia's Western Andes into north and central Ecuador. A. c. aethereus is found on the Andes' Pacific slope in southwestern Ecuador between El Oro and Loja provinces. The species inhabits cloudforest and semi-open landscapes like the transition of forest to grassland and grassland with trees and shrubs. It is most numerous at about 1,000 m (3,300 ft) of elevation but occurs as low as 300 m (980 ft) and as high as 2,100 m (6,900 ft).

== Behavior ==
=== Movement ===
The violet-tailed sylph is generally sedentary but makes some seasonal elevational movements to follow flowering events. In southwestern Colombia it is dominant during the dry season of January to April but is largely replaced by the long-tailed sylph during the wet season.

=== Feeding ===
The violet-tailed sylph's diet is nectar and small insects. It mostly forages near the ground but does ascend to the canopy. It uses trap-lining around a circuit of flowering plants but males also will defend specific feeding territories. It usually hovers at flowers to feed but often clings to them. It catches insects by hawking from a perch or by gleaning from vegetation.

=== Breeding ===
The violet-tailed sylph's breeding season spans from October to February. Both sexes build the nest, a dome of moss and spiderweb with a side entrance placed in a clump of moss or epiphytes. Nests are used for night roosts outside the breeding season. The female incubates the two white eggs for 15 to 17 days; fledging occurs 26 to 30 days after hatch.

=== Vocalization ===
The violet-tailed sylph's apparent song is "a continuous series of short notes, 'psit..psit..psit..'." Its calls include "a repeated, short, buzzy single or double 'bzzt' or 'bz-zzrt'...a higher-pitched drawn-out 'bzeee' [and] a high-pitched falling/rising twittering 'seee..seee..seee..seee..tr-tr-tititi-teetsee..see..see'."

== Status ==
The IUCN has assessed the violet-tailed sylph as being of Least Concern. It has a large range, and its population size is not known, but is believed to be decreasing. It is a common cloudforest resident, occurs in several protected areas, and "will tolerate areas of man-made habitats as long as patches of forest remain."
