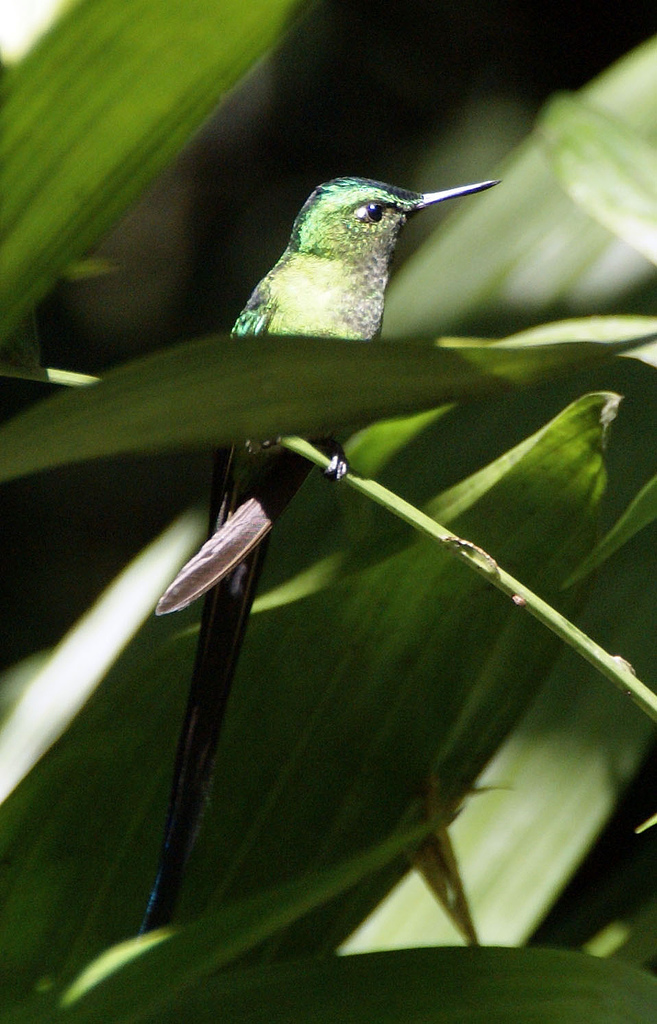
- Long-tailed sylph, Aglaiocercus kingii

Scientific classification
- Kingdom: Animalia
- Phylum: Chordata
- Class: Aves
- Order: Apodiformes
- Family: Trochilidae
- Tribe: Lesbiini
- Genus: Aglaiocercus; Zimmer, 1930

Type species
- Ornismya kingii Lesson, 1832

Species
- 3, see text

= Aglaiocercus =

Genus of birds

Aglaiocercus is a genus of hummingbird in the family Trochilidae.

== Description ==
It contains the following species:

Genus Aglaiocercus – Zimmer, 1930 – two species
Common name	Scientific name and subspecies	Range	Size and ecology	IUCN status and estimated population
Long-tailed sylph Male Female	Aglaiocercus kingii (Lesson, 1832) Six subspecies: A. k. margarethae; A. k. caudatus; A. k. emmae; A. k. kingii; A. k. mocoa; A. k. smaragdinus	Bolivia, Colombia, Ecuador, Peru, and Venezuela.	Size: Habitat: Diet:	LC
Violet-tailed sylph Male Female	Aglaiocercus coelestis (Gould, 1861)	Colombia and Ecuador.	Size: Habitat: Diet:	LC
Venezuelan sylph	Aglaiocercus berlepschi (Hartert, 1898)	Venezuela	Size: Habitat: Diet:	EN
