= HMS Sylph =

Six vessels of the Royal Navy have been named HMS Sylph after the air spirits known as sylphs:

- HMS Sylph (1776) was a 14-gun sloop purchased by the Royal Navy in 1776, previously the merchant Lovely Lass. She was renamed Lightning when she became a fire ship in 1779. She was sold in 1783.
- HMS Sylph (1780) was an 18-gun sloop purchased by the Royal Navy in 1780, previously the merchant cutter Active. She was captured by France in 1782 and served that country until 1788.
- HMS Sylph (1795) was an 18-gun Albatross-class sloop launched in 1795. She played a key role in the action of 12 May 1796 before being broken up in 1811.
- HMS Sylph (1812) was an 18-gun Bermuda-class brig-sloop launched in 1812 and wrecked in 1815.
- HMS Sylph (1832) was a 2-gun cutter launched in 1821 for the Post Office Packet Service but was never used. She was taken up by the Royal Navy in 1832 as a tender and lent to HM Customs as a watch vessel in 1862. She was sold in 1888.
- HMS Sylph (1916) was an R-class destroyer launched in 1916. In 1917 she collided with and sank her sister ship HMS Setter. She was sold in 1926 but stranded on her way to the breakers in 1927.

== See also ==
- HCS Sylph was an 8-gun schooner launched in 1806 by the Bombay Dockyard for the Bombay Marine, the naval arm of the British East India Company. Pirates captured her in 1808, but the Royal Navy recaptured her the same day. She was sold into mercantile service in 1826 and was last listed in 1829.
