= Venezuelan sylph =

Conservation status
- Vulnerable (IUCN 3.1)
- CITES Appendix II

Scientific classification
- Kingdom: Animalia
- Phylum: Chordata
- Class: Aves
- Order: Apodiformes
- Family: Trochilidae
- Genus: Aglaiocercus
- Species: A. berlepschi

Binomial name
- Aglaiocercus berlepschi (Hartert, 1898)

Species of hummingbird

The Venezuelan sylph (Aglaiocercus berlepschi) is a Vulnerable species of hummingbird in the "coquettes", tribe Lesbiini of subfamily Lesbiinae. It is restricted to two small mountain ranges in northeastern Venezuela.

== Taxonomy and systematics ==
The taxonomy of genus Aglaiocercus and of the Venezuelan sylph in particular are complicated. The genus also includes two other sylphs, the long-tailed (A. kingii) and violet-tailed (A. coelestis), and the three have several times been suggested to be either one species, or two with the Venezuelan being a subspecies of the long-tailed. Several additional species have been proposed for inclusion but they have almost conclusively been shown to be hybrids with kingii or one of the other sylphs. Since at least the early 2000s taxonomists have settled on the three-species treatment. The Venezuelan sylph is monotypic.

== Description ==
The male Venezuelan sylph is 22 cm (8.7 in) long including the 14 to 15 cm (5.5 to 5.9 in) outer tail feathers and weighs 5.5 g (0.19 oz). Females are 9.5 to 11 cm (3.7 to 4.3 in) long and weigh 4.5 g (0.16 oz). Both sexes have a short black bill. Males have a dark glittering green crown and a shining green back. They have a glittering blue gorget and bronzy green underparts with puffy white thighs. The inner tail feathers are short and blue-green; the outer ones are very long and deep violet at the base becoming blue at the end. Females have a glittering blue crown; otherwise their upperparts are similar to the male's. Their throat, breast, and belly are white with green spots. Their tail is short and slightly forked, blue-green with white tips on the outer feathers. Immatures resemble adult females with buffy fringes on the head feathers.

== Distribution and habitat ==
The Venezuelan sylph occurs where Sucre, Monagas, and Anzoátegui states meet. It is found in two ranges of the Turimiquire Massif, the eastern Cordillera de Caripe and the western Serranía de Turimiquire. It inhabits subtropical forest and scrubland on coastal mountain slopes between 1,450 and 1,800 m (4,800 and 5,900 ft) of elevation.

== Behavior ==
=== Movement ===
The Venezuelan sylph is sedentary.

=== Feeding ===
The Venezuelan sylph feeds on nectar from flowering vines, shrubs, and trees, especially those of genus Inga. It uses trap-lining around a circuit of flowering plants but also will defend specific feeding territories. It also catches insects by hawking from a perch. It typically forages alone or in pairs but sometimes several will feed at a flowering tree.

=== Breeding ===
The Venezuelan sylph's breeding season spans from August to January. The female builds a domed nest in epiphytes and incubates the eggs. Nothing else is known about the species' breeding phenology.

=== Vocalization ===
The Venezuelan sylph's apparent song is "a continuous series of buzzy notes 'bzzt...bzzt...bzzt...'." It also makes "a high-pitched rising twittering 'tititi-teetsee..see..seee'."

== Status ==
The IUCN has assessed the Venezuelan sylph as Vulnerable. Its population could be as small as 1500 mature individuals and is believed to be decreasing. It has a very small range whose landscape is increasingly being converted to agriculture and pasture. Though it occurs in Cueva del Guácharo National Park and Macizo Montañoso del Turimiquire Protective Zone, the latter is only nominally protected and deforestation continues there.
