= USS Sylph =

USS Sylph may refer to the following ships of the United States Navy:

- USS Sylph (1813) was launched on 18 August 1813 and sold in 1824
- USS Sylph (1831) was launched at Fell's Point in 1831 as Sarah Ann; the US Navy purchased her and renamed Sylph on 26 April 1831. She was lost at sea the same year
- USS Sylph (PY-5) was purchased in 1898; commissioned the same year serving as the Presidential Yacht until sold in 1929
- USS Sylph (PY-12) was acquired by the US Navy in 1940 and sold in December 1946
