= Sylph (1791 ship) =

British merchant ship 1791–1798

Great Britain
- Name: Sylph
- Namesake: Sylph
- Owner: W. Reynolds, Will. Holt, and Nath. Langborne, the latter in trust for Geo. Langborne, a minor
- Builder: Reynolds and Co.
- Launched: 1791
- Fate: Captured 1798

General characteristics
- Tons burthen: 312, or 320, or 328 (bm)
- Complement: 28
- Armament: 10 × 6-pounder guns + 5 swivel guns

Sylph was launched at Whitby in 1791. She made one voyage for the British East India Company (EIC) to New South Wales and China. However, a French privateer captured her in 1798 as she was returning to England.

== Career ==
Sylph shifted her registration to London and entered Lloyd's Register (LR) in 1792 with A. Ward, master, J. Jackson, owner, and trade London–Saint Petersburg.

Lloyd's Register for 1796 showed Sylph's master changing from A. Ward to J. White. Her owner changed from J. Jackson to P. Faith, and her trade changed from London–Saint Petersburg to London–Botany Bay.

Captain John White acquired a letter of marque 14 June 1796. On 10 June he sailed for Botany Bay and China.

Sylph arrived at Port Jackson from England with merchandise on 12 November. She left for China on 6 December.

== Fate ==
Lloyd's List reported on 20 March 1798 that Sylph was homeward bound from China when she parted from the convoy to the west of Cape Clear. It was believed that she had been captured. The French privateer Buonaparte captured her on 3 March at 51°18′N 21°00′W. (Note: Buonaparte was probably a 75-ton (bm) brig from Bayonne, commissioned in June 1797 under Louis Boulanger with 10-13 officers, 62-67 men, and 14 guns.) The EIC valued the cargo it had lost on Sylph at £32,542.
