= Mary Wandesford =

Mary Wandesford (1655–1726) was a devout religious unmarried woman, who was noted for creating an Anglican vocation for women similar to herself. The vocation still stands today.

== Background ==
Mary was born as the eldest daughter of five children, of Sir Christopher Wandesford, 1st Baronet Wandesford of Kirklington, and his wife Eleanor Lowther, the daughter of Sir John Lowther of Lowther Hall. They derived most of their wealth from coal mines in their Estate at Castlecomer in Ireland. Mary's brother, George Wandesford, was made Viscount Castlecomer in 1707. She was baptized in the church at Kirklington on 23 June 1655.

To pursue her religion, Mary Wandesford moved from her family's estate in rural Yorkshire to the city of York. There, she rented lodgings in a cathedral close and associated herself with the religious sphere. This included her expenditures in service to the church. One offering still notable today are the black gilded iron gates of the York cathedral.

== Wandesford House ==
She is known for the Wandesford House, a charity. Wandesford had never married and in her will, dated 4 November, 1725, left funds for the creation of a "religious house of Protestant retirement" in York for ten poor unmarried woman, thereby creating a religious community for single women. It was the norm during the time, though not a law, that siblings inherited. However, as a single woman, Wandesford exercised her freedom in her will. It was also notable because of the lack of religious vocationals available, especially for Anglican women, a circumstance she tried to change by her own means through her will. She bequeathed sizeable properties in Brompton on Swale, with a mortgage worth up to £1,200 and an additional £1,200 in South Sea Company Stocks and annuities, profits of which were not only used for the endowment of the institution, but also to pay for a schoolmaster to teach poor children at Kirklington. It was also her wish that at her funeral, "six of the poorest unmarried women in Kirklington may have white vales from head to foot prepared for them and white gloves, and carry [her] corps into the church...Let the white vales be such cloth as will do them service hereafter."
