= Bishop's borough =

A bishop's borough or bishop borough was a pocket borough in the Irish House of Commons where the patron who controlled the borough was the bishop for the time being of the diocese of the Church of Ireland whose cathedral was within the borough. All bishops were themselves ex officio members of the Irish House of Lords. Three bishop's boroughs (Old Leighlin, Clogher, and St Canice or Irishtown) were disenfranchised by the Acts of Union 1800, and their bishops at the time applied for the standard £15,000 compensation due to patrons of disenfranchised boroughs; however, the Commissioners rejected these claims, and awarded the money to the Board of First Fruits. Armagh City, the Archbishop of Armagh's borough, remained enfranchised at Westminster and under the archbishop's control until the Irish Reform Act 1832. Although Cashel and Tuam were originally archbishops' boroughs, they passed to lay patrons in the eighteenth century.

== History ==
Even before seats in the House of Commons were greatly valued, the Irish bishops had interested themselves in the municipal corporations and in municipal politics. In 1680 John Vesey, archbishop of Tuam, wrote to Ormonde to present Alderman Thomas Cartwright, the newly elected mayor of Galway, "as a person very well qualified for that trust, on account of his conformity to the Church, and consequently his loyalty to the King." "And indeed," added the archbishop, "I must needs say, with much comfort, for the few English Protestants there incorporated, that they seem to be very well principled, all very uniform in their public devotions, and manageable on any occasion readily for his Majesty's service."

After the 1688–91 Revolution the bishops continued their interest in municipal politics with a view to Parliamentary influence; and in the eighteenth century bishops were frequently of the great borough-owning families, and were often borough managers on their own account. The method of securing borough control through dependents was one which was sometimes acted upon by the bishops who were in control of boroughs. It was chiefly through the clergy, as freemen in Irishtown and Cashel, as members of the corporation in Clogher and Armagh, and as freeholders at Old Leighlin, that the Irish bishops were able to maintain an easy hold on their boroughs, and, with the boroughs thus in their possession, to use the power of nomination to the House of Commons to their own advantage in the Church. The influence enjoyed by the bishops probably accounts for the abortive motion in the House of Commons in 1710, "that leave be given to bring in the heads of a bill to prevent the promotion of any spiritual person for reward."

A. P. W. Malcomson suggests that the appointment of cathedral clergy as burgesses of the corporations of Irishtown, Clogher, and Old Leighlin was a consequence of the scarcity of other resident members of the Church of Ireland; although the Newtown Act 1748 (21 Geo. 2 c. 10 (I)) allowed non-resident burgesses, this did not apply to "cities", a class which arguably included all cathedral towns.

Until 1783, the four boroughs belonging to the bishops, Irishtown, Clogher, Old Leighlin, and Armagh, had been regarded as Crown property, and as providing opportunities for bringing into the House of Commons men connected with the Government. The idea that these boroughs were the property of the bishops, to be used as other borough proprietors used their boroughs, dated from Lord Northington's administration. The Constitution of 1782 increased the independence of the Irish Parliament, and at the general election of 1783, on the usual application being made to the bishops for the nominations for their boroughs, three of them answered the Lord Lieutenant that their seats were already disposed of. Northington wrote for instructions from London in this emergency. "Was he," he asked, " to signify to these prelates his Majesty's disapprobation of their conduct?" Lord North, the British prime minister, replied: "The King [George III] is unwilling to interfere, but he agrees with your excellency, that it is extremely improper conduct." Walter Cope, who as bishop of Ferns and Leighlin controlled the borough of Old Leighlin, was the only bishop who at this general election gave his two seats to the Government. Cope was rewarded by the promotion of his brother-in-law Archibald Acheson from Baron to Viscount Gosford.

At the Union £15,000 was allowed as compensation in respect of each of the three bishop boroughs, Irishtown, Clogher, and Old Leighlin. The compensation, however, did not go to the bishops, each of whom had put in an individual claim. The sum of £45,000 was handed over to the Commissioners of First-Fruits, subject to the condition that the interest accruing from it should be expended in such a way as would best promote residence of the clergy of the Established Church; a decision Porritt describes as "certainly equitable".

The claim which Hugh Hamilton, bishop of Ossory, made for personal compensation at the Union contains a statement which is of value in the representative history of Ireland. It puts beyond question the reasons which induced the bishops to trouble themselves with borough management. After advancing five statements in support of his case that the borough of Irishtown had long been under the individual control of successive bishops of Ossory, Hamilton affirmed that the control so exercised by himself and his predecessors had "given the bishops of Ossory so much additional consequence, and obtained for them so much attention from Government, that the bishops of that see, with the exception of only two bishops, who died soon after their appointment, for above a century past have been all translated to much more eligible bishoprics." Hamilton further urged that by the Union he was to be deprived of "that influence and consequence which his predecessors always enjoyed, and from which they derived great advantage"; and therefore he considered himself entitled to claim any allowance which might be awarded for the extinction of Irishtown as a parliamentary borough.

== Particular boroughs ==
=== Armagh ===
The city of Armagh, County Armagh, was the episcopal seat of the primate of All Ireland, the Archbishop of Armagh. The sovereign of Armagh corporation was the primate's land agent, or the seneschal of the manor. The other burgesses were clergymen, "who seem to have held on an express or implied stipulation to resign on quitting the diocese, or in case of their becoming unwilling to act under the archbishop's direction." As these clergymen naturally looked to the archbishop for preferment, it is improbable that there were many resignations under the last clause of the agreement; and a corporation so managed must have been as easy to control as through tenants who had taken an oath, and against whom, moreover, the agent had the additional lever of the "hanging gale" (rent arrears).

At Armagh, in the closing years of the old representative system, the archbishop although he was not a member of the corporation, and had no constitutional connection with it commanded twelve of the thirteen votes by which the members of Parliament for the city were elected; and "so completely was the election of the members considered to be in the primate, that he regularly paid the expenses of the admission of the free burgesses, amounting to five pounds each."

=== Irishtown ===
Irishtown was a suburb of the city of Kilkenny, within the county of the city but forming a separate borough, called Irishtown or St Canice. The 1707 election was held indoors because of bad weather, in the hall of the bishop of Ossory. For many years prior to 1734, it was the custom of the bishop to order the portreeve "to give cockets to gentlemen, thereby making them free; and as often as the bishop desired it, the same was done." Cockets were the titles by which freemen established their right to vote.

The connection thus early existing between the bishops and the borough of Irishtown continued to the last; for at the Union Hugh Hamilton, then bishop of Ossory, claimed as his individual property the fifteen thousand pounds which were to be paid as compensation for the disfranchisement of the borough, and in his statement of claim laid stress on the fact "that for a long series of years all elections of members of Parliament have been held in the bishop's palace-yard, and the other corporate meetings in his hall."

Among the grounds proffered for the bishop's claim to the compensation to be awarded at the Union was that, by immemorial custom, part of the oath of office taken by the portreeve of Irishtown was to be true to the interests of the bishop of Ossory; that the burgesses were always elected on the recommendation of the bishop; that neither property, residence, nor service in the borough was required of any freeman; that hardly one inhabitant of the borough in 1800 was a freeman; and that the influence of the bishop had always been so powerful that all members of Parliament and burgesses had been uniformly elected on his recommendation, without one instance to the contrary. In 1779, the Lord Lieutenant the Earl of Buckinghamshire was writing to the prime minister Lord North to recommend John Hotham for the see of Ossory, and reminded North that there was a borough with the see, "which requires a great deal of management," adding that for this work Hotham "appears to me particularly well qualified."

=== Old Leighlin ===
The hamlet of Old Leighlin, County Carlow was a corporation borough, one of the creations of James I. The elective franchise was in the portreeve and twelve free burgesses. When the Irish Municipal Commissioners made their visit to Old Leighlin there were only twenty houses and not more than one hundred inhabitants. Although St Laserian's Cathedral, the seat of the Diocese of Leighlin, was in Old Leighlin, the diocese was merged in 1597 with the Diocese of Ferns so that the Bishop of Ferns and Leighlin became the patron of the borough. It must have been an easy borough for the bishop to manage: easier than ever after the Newtown Act of 1747. From the Journals little can be learned of its history; for election petitions were infrequent from any of the boroughs created by James I. These were never easy of attack; and Old Leighlin was doubtless managed, as was the borough of Armagh, with the corporation largely composed of the clergymen of the diocese.

=== Clogher ===
The village of Clogher, County Tyrone was originally a corporation borough. It was enfranchised by letters patent in the fifth year of Charles I, and by its constitution the corporation was to consist of a portreeve and twelve burgesses, and the first members were to be nominated by the then bishop of Clogher. "We are unable," wrote the Municipal Commissioners who visited the borough in 1833, "to discover any trace of the existence of a corporation, beyond what may arise from the right to vote for members of Parliament having been attached by the bishops of Clogher to the grant of each stall in the cathedral, and the exercise of that right." For some time the corporation apparently existed in this loose form, and the occupants of the stalls in the cathedral were the sole electors of the members from Clogher; but in the middle of the eighteenth century the freeholders of the manor tendered their votes at an election. They were refused; and they petitioned Parliament against the return. The House of Commons admitted their right to vote; and Clogher thus became a manor borough. The bishops, however, never lost their control, and at the Union Clogher was dealt with as one of the bishop boroughs.

=== Cashel ===
The city of Cashel, County Tipperary was a freeman borough, and in the early part of the eighteenth century it was as much a bishop's borough as Armagh. Evidence of the archbishop's political control of Cashel is to be found in the Journals for 1737. The methods of borough management there were then very similar to those at Armagh. William Palliser was archbishop of Cashel from 1696 until 1726. He was a freeman of the borough; and was active in the election of mayor and aldermen, because by these officers the making of freemen was controlled. It was usual after an ordination at the St. John's Cathedral to make the newly ordained clergymen freemen of the borough. Dr Burgess, a clergyman, was mayor; and, to quote from the evidence in the election case of 1737, "the archbishop had an ordination at Cashel in Dr Burgess' mayoralty, when there were about eighteen or twenty young men ordained, and they were all admitted freemen of the corporation." The local clergymen at Cashel were active among the resident freemen, lending them money and rendering them other services in the interest of the archbishop, who bestowed preferment on clergymen who aided him in his management and control of the borough. But although, in the early decades of the eighteenth century, Palliser was in full control of Cashel, it did not become, like Irishtown, Clogher, Old Leighlin, or Armagh, permanently a bishop's borough; and for seventy years before the Irish Reform Act 1832, Cashel was in the possession of the Pennefather family, who held it, not as Palliser had done by making many freemen, but by restricting the number and electing none but members of the Pennefather family into the corporation.

=== Tuam ===
The town of Tuam, County Galway, was a corporation borough controlled by the Archbishop of Tuam from its enfranchisement in 1614, but it passed to the Bingham family after Henry Bingham married archbishop John Vesey's daughter Anne in 1714.

== Sources ==
Text mostly adapted from this public-domain book

- Porritt, Edward; Annie G. Porritt (1903). The unreformed House of Commons; parliamentary representation before 1832. Vol. 2: Scotland and Ireland. Cambridge, UK: Cambridge University Press. pp. 307–315, 333.

Other sources

- Proceedings of Commissioners under Union Compensation Act of Ireland (Boroughs &c.). Sessional Papers. Vol. 1803–04 HC VIII (159) 675. HMSO. 7 July 1804.
- Further Proceedings of Commissioners under Union Compensation Act of Ireland (Boroughs &c.). Sessional Papers. Vol. 1805 HC VII (89) 597. HMSO. 26 April 1805.
- "Constituencies". History of the Irish Parliament. Ulster Historical Foundation. Archived from the original on 24 April 2014.
