= Edmund Jennings =

Edmund Jennings or Jenings may refers to:

- Edmund Jennings (Member of Parliament) (1626–1691), Member of Parliament for Ripon
- Edmund Jenings (governor) a.k.a. Edmund Jennings (1659–1727), Colonial Governor of Virginia, son of above
