= Richard Sandford (disambiguation) =

Richard Sandford was a Royal Navy officer.

Richard Sandford may also refer to:

- Sir Richard Sandford, 2nd Baronet (died 1675) of the Sandford baronets
- Sir Richard Sandford, 3rd Baronet (1675–1723), MP
- Richard Sandford, character in Alias John Preston
