= Christopher Wandesford, 2nd Viscount Castlecomer =

Irish politician (1684–1719)

The Right Honourable The Viscount Castlecomer PC
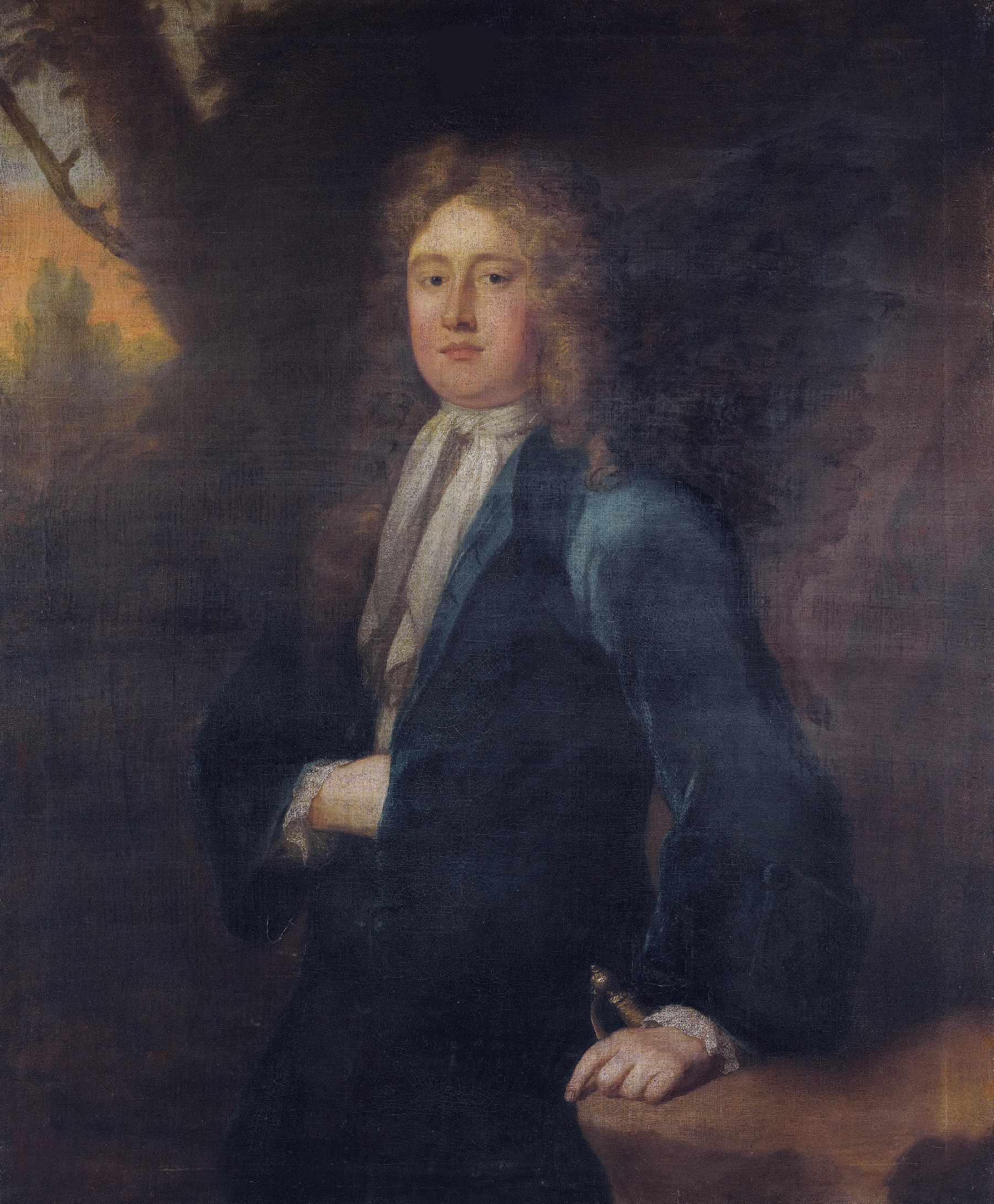
- Christopher Wandesford, 2nd Viscount Castlecomer (ca 1683-1719) by Michael Dahl, (1659-1743)

Secretary at War
- In office 1718
- Preceded by: James Craggs the Younger
- Succeeded by: Robert Pringle

Member of Parliament for Morpeth with Richard Sandford
- In office 1710–1713
- Preceded by: Richard Sandford & Sir John Bennett
- Succeeded by: Sir John Germain & Oley Douglas

Christopher Wandesford, 2nd Viscount Castlecomer (2 March 1684 – 23 June 1719) was an Irish Whig politician who sat in the Parliament of Ireland in 1707 and in the British House of Commons between 1710 and 1719.

Wandesford was the son of Christopher Wandesford, 1st Viscount Castlecomer. He was educated at Trinity College, Dublin in 1702.

Wandesford served as the Member of Parliament for St Canice in the Parliament of Ireland between July and September 1707. He also succeeded to his father's titles on 15 September 1707. On 25 April 1710 he was made a member of the Privy Council of Ireland and was Governor of Kilkenny from 1715.

At the 1710 British general election, Wandesford was returned to Parliament as MP for Morpeth but lost the seat in 1713. He was a member of the Hanover Club. At the 1715 general election he was returned as MP for Ripon and sat until his death in 1719. He was Secretary at War in 1718.

Castlecomer married Hon. Frances Pelham, daughter of Thomas Pelham, 1st Baron Pelham and Lady Grace Holles, on 31 May 1715. He died aged 35 and was succeeded by his only child, Christopher.

Political offices
Preceded by James Craggs	Secretary at War; 1718	Succeeded by Robert Pringle
Parliament of Great Britain
Preceded by Richard Sandford; Sir John Bennett	Member of Parliament for Morpeth; 1710–1713; With: Richard Sandford	Succeeded by Sir John Germain; Oley Douglas
Preceded by Sir John Germain; Oley Douglas	Member of Parliament for Morpeth; 1715–1717; With: Viscount Morpeth	Succeeded by Viscount Morpeth; Hon. George Carpenter
Preceded by John Sharp; John Aislabie	Member of Parliament for Ripon; 1715–1719; With: John Aislabie	Succeeded by John Aislabie; William Aislabie
Parliament of Ireland
Preceded by Richard Connell; Sir Christopher Wandesford	Member of Parliament for St Canice; 1707; With: Richard Connell	Succeeded by Richard Connell; Richard Cole
Peerage of Ireland
Preceded by Christopher Wandesford	Viscount Castlecomer; 1707–1719	Succeeded by Christopher Wandesford
