= Richard Sanford =

Richard Sanford may refer to:

- Richard Sanford (runner), American middle-distance runner
- Richard K. Sanford, American newspaper editor and politician from New York
- Rick Sanford, American football defensive back

== See also ==
- Richard Sandford (disambiguation)
