= Wandesford House =

Listed almshouse in York, England

- The building in 2021
- Former names: Mary Wandesford Old Maid's Hospital

General information
- Location: 37 Bootham, York, England
- Coordinates: 53°57′50″N 1°05′12″W
- Completed: 1739
- Opened: 1743
- Renovated: Mid-19th century (altered); 1968 (doorcase added)

Technical details
- Floor count: 2

Design and construction
- Designations

Listed Building – Grade II*
- Official name: Wandesford House
- Designated: 14 June 1954
- Reference no.: 1259452

Wandesford House is an 18th-century almshouse in the centre of York, England, one of 12 still-functioning almshouses in the city, and the oldest still in its original building. Built in 1739 and opened in 1743, the house is an important example of the classical style in the city. Like many historic almshouses, it was referred to as a hospital before that term became chiefly associated with medical establishments.

The almshouse lies a few yards outside the city walls on the north-west side of Bootham behind its front garden and between houses of a later date. Inside are 12 flats intended for single Christian women who are in hardship, need or distress, and over 50 years of age.

Wandesford House is Grade II* listed by Historic England and is owned and run by Mary Wandesford's charity (the Wandesford Trust; charity reg. 251379). The archives of the charity are held at the Borthwick Institute for Archives, University of York.

== Foundation of the hospital ==
Wandesford Hospital was founded under the terms of Mary Wandesford's will. She bequeathed an estate at Brompton-on-Swale valued at £1,200, together with another £1,200 in South Sea stock in trust "for the use of ten poor gentlewomen who were never married and who shall be of the religion which is taught and practised in the Church of England as by law established, who shall retire from the hurry and noise of the world into a religious house of protestant retirement which shall be provided for them and they shall be obliged to continue there for life...".

The wording of this appears to have suggested to the Wandesford family that she intended it as a kind of nunnery for young women, which at that period may have seemed an undesirable aim. In any case, her heirs took the will to the Court of Chancery for a ruling. The court upheld the will in 1739 but decreed that the age at entry to the hospital should be 50 years, to ensure that it would be a refuge for elderly spinsters, and not a house of retirement for young women. The house was completed in 1743 and opened to its first 10 women beneficiaries, who were paid the stipend that made the establishment an alms house. Because so many almshouses were for widows, one slightly unfortunate result was that it became known as the Old Maids' Hospital or, sometimes, the Protestant Old Maids' Hospital.

A farm near Brompton-on-Swale, formerly part of the endowment, is still known as Old Maids Farm. Since 1975, some of the restrictions on entry to the almshouse have been lifted, so that the title Old Maids' Hospital is no longer appropriate (and is never used). The house now accepts single women of any Christian faith and any former marital status and is known as Wandesford House.

== Architecture ==
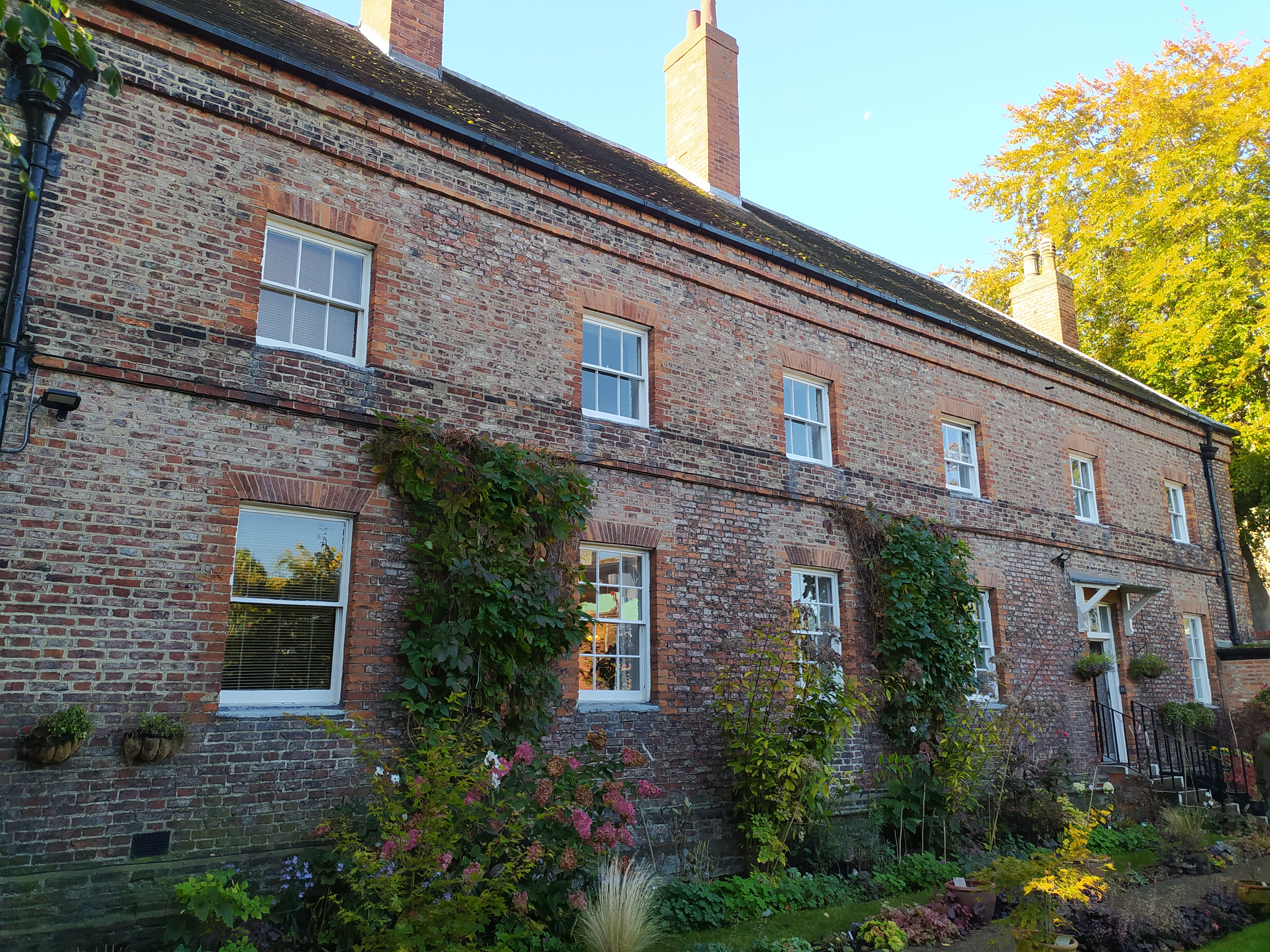
Rear view of Wandesford House, from the garden

Following the Court of Chancery decree upholding Mary's will, a parcel of land in Bootham, York, was acquired from William Wilberforce of Hull (1690–1776), grandfather of the anti-slave trade campaigner William Wilberforce, and building began. Wandesford Hospital was designed by Colonel James Moyser, a gentleman architect and an associate of Richard Boyle, 3rd Earl of Burlington. There are two other almshouses by James Moyser, both in Beverley: Ann Routh's Hospital and Tymperon House, which share several architectural features with Wandesford House, notably the giant arches and window style. Ann Routh's also features the same projecting pediment, which contains a cartouche.

The builders of Wandesford Hospital included a carpenter, John Terry, and bricklayers Robert Kibblewhite, Thomas Dunn, and Richard Nestrop. John Terry is listed as working on the State Room in the Mansion House, York, in 1725, and Richard Nelthorpe is listed as a plasterer there. The similarity of name suggests he may be the same person as Richard Nestrop.

The house is two storeys tall, built in red brick with a tiled roof. The valley in the centre of the pitched roofs was covered over with a flat roof in 1967. The south-facing façade of the house is of seven bays under giant arches and with a deep plinth. A projecting central pediment contains a portrait bust of Mary Wandesford. The plain brick central door frame was given a timber doorcase in 1968, with a broken pediment above containing the coat of arms of Mary Wandesford in a lozenge. The rear elevation is simpler and lacks the arched recesses and the elaborate cornice of the front. An original rainwater head remains, bearing the date 1739.

There are gardens at the front and rear, and originally, an orchard. Bootham School, whose grounds lie behind the house, bought the orchard in 1957 for use as tennis courts. The interior ground floor has a central corridor off the entrance hall, and a staircase at each end of the house leading to an upper corridor. Initially, the ground floor was flagged throughout; however, most of the flagstones were removed, probably in the nineteenth century, and wooden flooring was installed along with some internal staircases.

Until the 1960s, each dwelling consisted of a ground-floor sitting room, with a small range for heating and cooking, and a first-floor bedroom. There were no washing or toilet facilities inside until sometime in the 19th or 20th century, when the residents were able to share two indoor WCs and one bath. The house was remodelled in 1967–68 to create 12 self-contained flats, each with its own kitchen and bathroom. Four are maisonettes and retain the 19th-century internal staircase leading to the bedrooms. From the beginning, there was a chapel where a chaplain held a service every Wednesday and Friday. The present chaplain takes communion once a month.

== Mary Wandesford 1655–1725 ==
Mary Wandesford's grandfather, Sir Christopher Wandesford (1592–1640) of Kirklington, Yorkshire, was an MP who later became Lord Deputy of Ireland. He acquired an estate at Castlecomer in County Kilkenny, where he built a castle. His grandson, Mary's brother Christopher, was created an Irish peer in 1707 as Viscount Castlecomer. The family's wealth derived in part from coal mines in that area. The fifth Viscount, born the year Mary died, was made Earl Wandesford in 1758, but the title became extinct in 1784.

Mary was one of five children, the eldest daughter of Sir Christopher Wandesford and his wife Eleanor Lowther. She was baptised in the church at Kirklington on 23 June 1655. There is a portrait of her as a young woman inside Wandesford House, as well as the stone bust on the front of the house. She never married, and when she died in 1725, she was buried at Kirklington. A codicil to her will of 4 November 1725 states "I appoint that £5 be given into the hands of some that goes along with my corps [corpse] to the burying place, to be distributed to the poor people in the road as they pass along, or put into the hands of the minister or churchwardens to distribute as needful. I desire that there may be no state nor trouble in my funeral, but 6 of the poorest unmarried women in Kirklington may have white vales [veils] from head to foot prepared for them and white gloves, and carry my corpse into the church at the place where I happen to be buried. Let the white vales be such cloth as will do them service hereafter." (Reg. test. Ebor. LXXIX, iii, 1).

== See also ==
- Grade II* listed buildings in the City of York
- Listed buildings in York (outside the city walls, northern part)
