= St Canice (Parliament of Ireland constituency) =

Pre-1801 Irish constituency

- Former borough constituency for the Irish House of Commons
- County: County Kilkenny
- Borough: St Canice

–1801
- Seats: 2
- Replaced by: Disfranchised

St Canice, also called Irishtown, was a constituency represented in the Irish House of Commons from 1661 until 1800. Irishtown was a bishop's borough within the parish of St Canice in the county of the city of Kilkenny. The borough was separate from the city itself, which was represented by Kilkenny City constituency.

The borough was disfranchised by the Acts of Union 1800. Compensation for the loss of the patronage was awarded in the standard amount of £15,000. The claim of Hugh Hamilton, Bishop of Ossory to this compensation was disallowed; instead it went to the Commissioners of First Fruits.

== Members of Parliament ==
=== 1661–1801 ===
Election	First MP	Second MP
1661	Sir William Flower	Oliver Wheeler
1692	Richard Connell	Sir Christopher Wandesford, 2nd Bt
July 1707	Richard Connell	Hon. Christopher Wandesford
September 1707	Richard Connell	Richard Cole
1713	Sir Standish Hartstonge, 2nd Bt	Sir Robert Maude, 1st Bt
1727	James Agar	Richard Dawson
January 1734	Richard Reade	Richard Dawson
1734	Hervey Morres	Richard Dawson
1757	Viscount Moore	Richard Dawson
1759	Eland Mossom	Richard Dawson
1761	Eland Mossom	Thomas Waite
1768	Eland Mossom	Lord Frederick Campbell
1774	Thomas Radcliffe	Lord Frederick Campbell
1776	John Monck Mason	John William Hamilton
1781	John Monck Mason	Dominick Trant
1783	John Monck Mason	Hon. Richard Annesley
1790	John Monck Mason	Marcus Beresford
1794	John Monck Mason	Sylvester Douglas
1796	John Monck Mason	William Elliot
1801	Disenfranchised	
