= Robert Pringle (secretary at war) =

Scottish lawyer and politician

The Right Honourable Robert Pringle

Secretary at War
- In office 18 May 1718 – 24 December 1718
- Preceded by: The Viscount Castlecomer
- Succeeded by: George Treby

Personal details
- Died: 13 September 1736 Rotterdam
- Children: 1

Robert Pringle (died 1736) was a Scottish lawyer and politician.

== Life ==
He was the third son of Sir Robert Pringle, 1st Baronet, of Stitchel, by his wife, Margaret, daughter of Sir John Hope, Lord Craighall, a lord of session; and a younger brother of Sir Walter Pringle of Lochton, Lord Newhall. After studying at the University of Leyden, which he entered 19 November 1687, he took service under William, Prince of Orange, with whom he went over to England at the Glorious Revolution of 1688.

Pringle was in practice as an attorney, and was then appointed under-secretary of state for Scotland in 1695. In this capacity he attended King William in his campaigns abroad.

On 18 May 1718, Pringle was appointed Secretary at War, and he held that office until 24 December. Subsequently, he became registrar-general of the shipping.

Pringle died at Rotterdam on 13 September 1736.

== Family ==
Pringle married a Miss Law, and had one son, Robert.

== Notes ==
Attribution

This article incorporates text from a publication now in the public domain: Lee, Sidney, ed. (1896). "Pringle, Robert". Dictionary of National Biography. Vol. 46. London: Smith, Elder & Co.
