= Irishtown, Kilkenny =

Neighbourhood in County Kilkenny, Ireland

Coordinates: 52°39′24.40″N 07°15′25.72″W

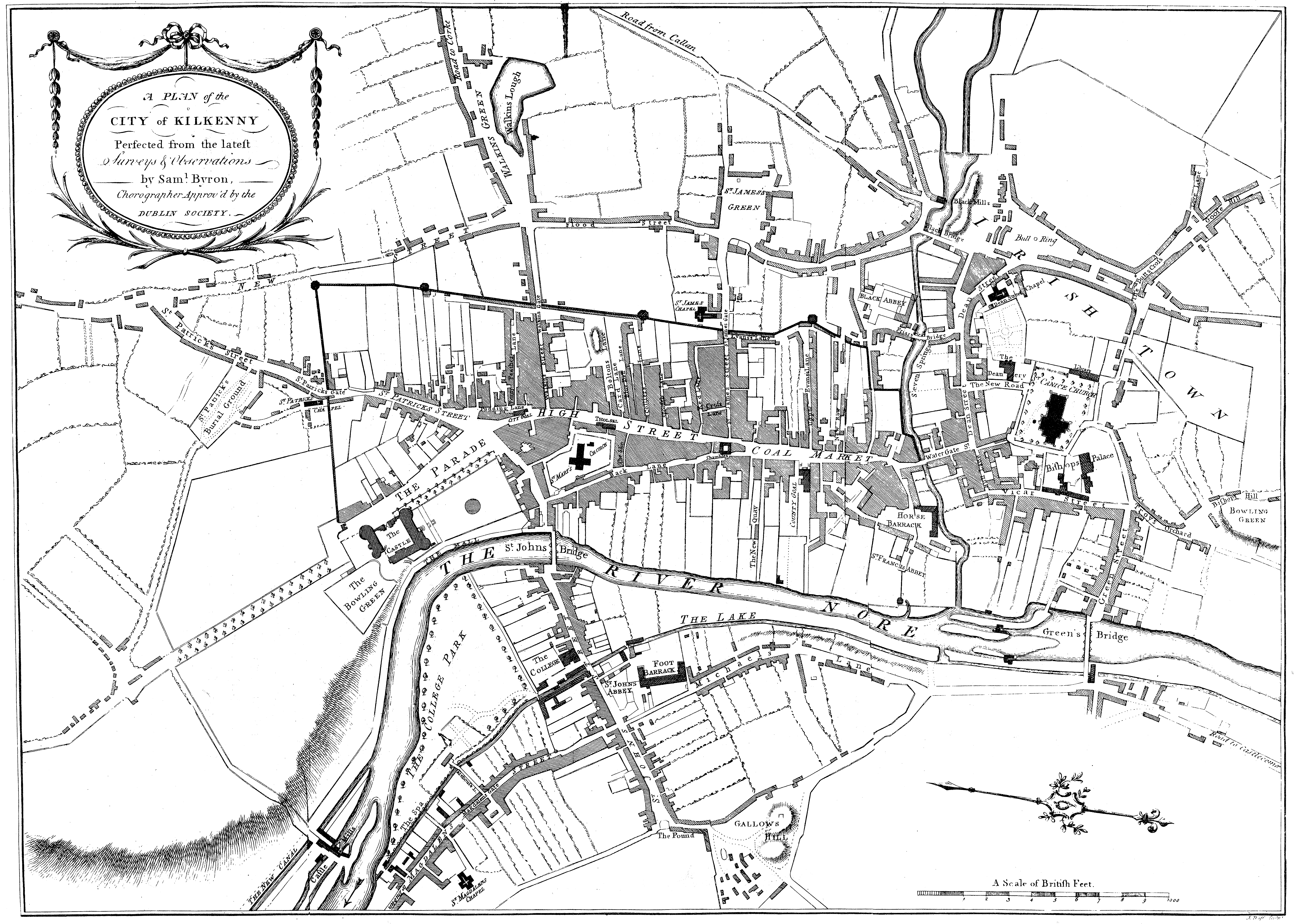
1780 map of Kilkenny, with Irishtown to the right (north) of the walled city

Irishtown (Irish: An Baile Gaelach) is the neighborhood in Kilkenny in Ireland around St Canice's Cathedral. It was formerly a borough, also called Newcourt or St Canice's, separated by the River Breagagh from the walled town of Kilkenny to the south.

== History ==
The site of Irishtown was the capital of the Mac Giolla Phádraig dynasty of the medieval Kingdom of Ossory, and a daughter house of Aghaboe Abbey was built there. In 1111 the Synod of Ráth Breasail divided Ireland into dioceses, with the Diocese of Ossory based on the Gaelic kingdom and the abbey church became St Canice's Cathedral. The name Kilkenny is from the Irish Cill Chainnigh "church of St. Canice". The status of episcopal seat spurred the growth of the existing settlement. After the Norman invasion of Ireland, the Anglo-Normans built Kilkenny Castle near by as the seat of the new County of Kilkenny, which had largely the same extent as the Kingdom of Ossory. Two separate boroughs were recognised: the "English Town" or "High Town" of the colonists around the Castle, and the Gaelic "Irish Town" around the Cathedral. When County Kilkenny was a liberty with a seneschal, the English borough of Kilkenny was within it, but the precincts of the cathedral were excluded from the liberty, in the "crosslands" (church ground) subject to the sheriff of County Dublin. Kilkenny and Irishtown were both walled towns with separate walls, and connected by Watergate Bridge over the Breagagh. Irishtown was poorer than Kilkenny. The corporation's seal, whose Latin inscription read "the common seal of the Kilkenny citizens of the see of Ossory", was of inferior metal to that of the Kilkenny corporation. The members of the corporation were clergy in the diocese.

In 1609, Kilkenny borough was made a city, and a County of the City was created, separate from County Kilkenny, with its own sheriff and grand jury. The city comprised parts of four parishes, and the new county covered the whole of each, with the area outside the borough forming the "liberties" of the city. The borough of Irishtown in the parish of St Canice was thenceforth in the liberties of the County of the City of Kilkenny. It was through Dean's Gate in 1650 that Cromwell's army entered Irishtown and from there captured Kilkenny, capital of Confederate Ireland.

St Canice was a borough constituency in the House of Commons of Ireland, separate from Kilkenny City constituency. The city constituency was in the direct control of the Earl of Ormond, whereas St Canice was a bishop's borough whose patron was the Bishop of Ossory in the established Church of Ireland. Since the power of appointing the bishop was in the gift of the Earl of Ormond, the practical difference was slight. St Canice borough was disfranchised at the Acts of Union 1800, but the borough corporation remained separate from that of Kilkenny until the Municipal Corporations (Ireland) Act 1840. That Act abolished both corporations, and appointed the town commissioners of Kilkenny borough as successors to both, and defined new limits of the borough of Kilkenny, which included all the land of both predecessor boroughs. The Irishtown corporation records were transferred to the Kilkenny Tholsel.

In 1846, the Parliamentary Gazetteer wrote of Kilkenny:

The city all stands on the right bank of the Nore, and is cut by the Bregah rivulet into the two great sections of Irishtown and Englishtown, or of the more ancient and the less ancient Kilkenny ... Irishtown on the north of the Bregah, and Englishtown on the south, though formerly regarded as distinct towns, and even possessing separate charters and corporations, are now both topographically and politically fused into each other, so as to form in the strictest sense one town; and except that each possesses remains of its originally distinctive character, and boasts as a pre-eminent feature its peculiar metropolitical edifice, the former in St. Canice cathedral on a hill or rising ground in the north, and the latter in Kilkenny-castle on a hill or rising ground in the south-east, they could not possibly be suspected by even a dabbler in Irish antiquities, who should happen to be ignorant of their particular history, to have ever been in any manner mutually distinct.

—

== Geography ==
The historic neighbourhood retains a distinctive local character within the modern city of Kilkenny. The street leading south from the Cathedral to the Breagagh is called Irishtown.
