= Emanuel Howe (British Army officer) =

British Army general

Lieutenant-General Emanuel Howe MP
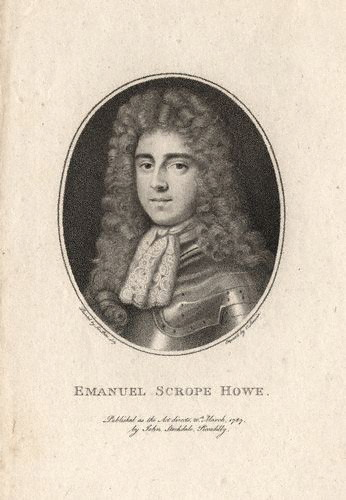

Member of Parliament for Wigan

Personal details
- Party: Whig
- Spouse: Ruperta Howe
- Children: James Howe; Emanuel Howe; Henrietta Howe; Sophia Arabella Howe; William Howe; Rachel Howe
- Parent: John Grobham Howe (father)

Lieutenant-General Emanuel Scrope Howe (c. 1663 – 26 September 1709), of The Great Lodge, Alice Holt Forest, Hampshire, was an English diplomat, army officer, and Member of Parliament.

== Life ==
He was the fourth son of John Grubham Howe (1625–1679) of Langar Hall in Nottinghamshire, the younger son of Sir John Howe, 1st Baronet. His older brother, Scrope Howe, 1st Viscount Howe, was a prominent Whig politician, raised to the peerage in 1701. Emanuel Howe was appointed a Groom of the Bedchamber in 1689 as reward for his support for William III, and held the office throughout the king's reign. Howe was also given a commission in the 1st Foot Guards, and served in Flanders where he was wounded at the 1695 Siege of Namur. He purchased a colonelcy in 1695, and was Colonel of the 15th Regiment of Foot until his death. He was promoted to Brigadier-General in 1704, Major-General in 1707 and Lieutenant-General in the year of his death, 1709. He was First Commissioner of Prizes from 1703 to 1705, and envoy-extraordinary to the Elector of Hanover between 1705 and 1709, successfully overcoming the strained relations between the English and Hanoverian reigning families to keep Hanover in the Grand Alliance.

He entered Parliament in 1701 as member for Morpeth, elected as a placeman on the Earl of Carlisle's interest to support the Court Whigs, and in 1705 also represented Wigan. He is recorded as taking part in only one debate.

== Ranger of the Royal Forest of Alice Holt ==
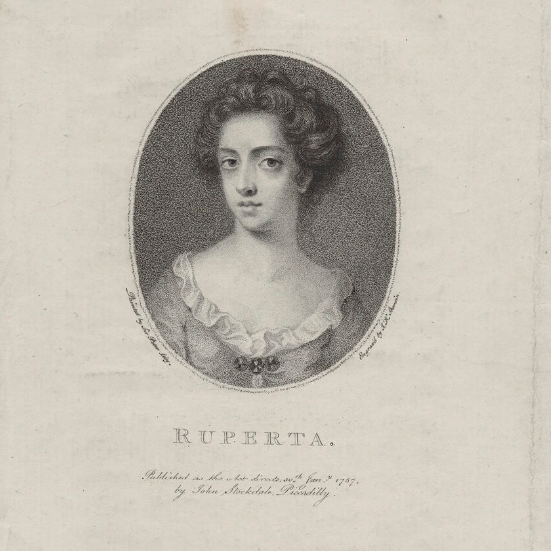
Ruperta Howe

He married Ruperta Hughes, the natural daughter of Prince Rupert of the Rhine, in 1695. They were jointly appointed "Rangers of Alice Holt Forest" from 1699 onwards, a grace-and-favour sinecure. They had three sons and two daughters. After Howe's death, Ruperta continued as "Ranger of the Holt" until 1740.

Howe was not pleased when, having spent £1,200 on repairs to the Great Lodge as requested by King William, the King repeatedly refused to repay him.

He attempted some ambitious re-introductions in the Forest, including wild boar and, moving beyond simple re-introductions, even buffalo, but these succumbed to the poaching which was endemic in Alice Holt and neighbouring Woolmer Forest at the time. Ruperta planted an oak tree near the Lodge in memory of her late father, Prince Rupert, which was replaced in the 1960s by a memorial stone. The present Lodge building dates from the 1810s but stands on the site of the Great Lodge occupied by Emanuel and Ruperta.

== Notes ==
Parliament of England
Preceded by Sir Richard Sandford, Bt; Sir Henry Belasyse	Member of Parliament for Morpeth; 1701–1705; With: Sir John Delaval, Bt	Succeeded by Sir Richard Sandford, Bt; Edmund Maine
Preceded by Orlando Bridgeman; Sir Roger Bradshaigh, Bt	Member of Parliament for Wigan; 1705–1707; With: Sir Roger Bradshaigh, Bt	Succeeded by Parliament of Great Britain
Parliament of Great Britain
Preceded by Parliament of England	Member of Parliament for Wigan; 1707–1709; With: Sir Roger Bradshaigh, Bt	Succeeded by Henry Bradshaigh; Sir Roger Bradshaigh, Bt
Military offices
Preceded by Sir James Leslie	Colonel of Emanuel Howe's Regiment of Foot; 1695–1709	Succeeded by The Duke of Somerset
