= Walter Pringle, Lord Newhall =

Scottish lawyer and judge

Sir Walter Pringle, Lord Newhall (1664?–1736) was a Scottish lawyer and judge.

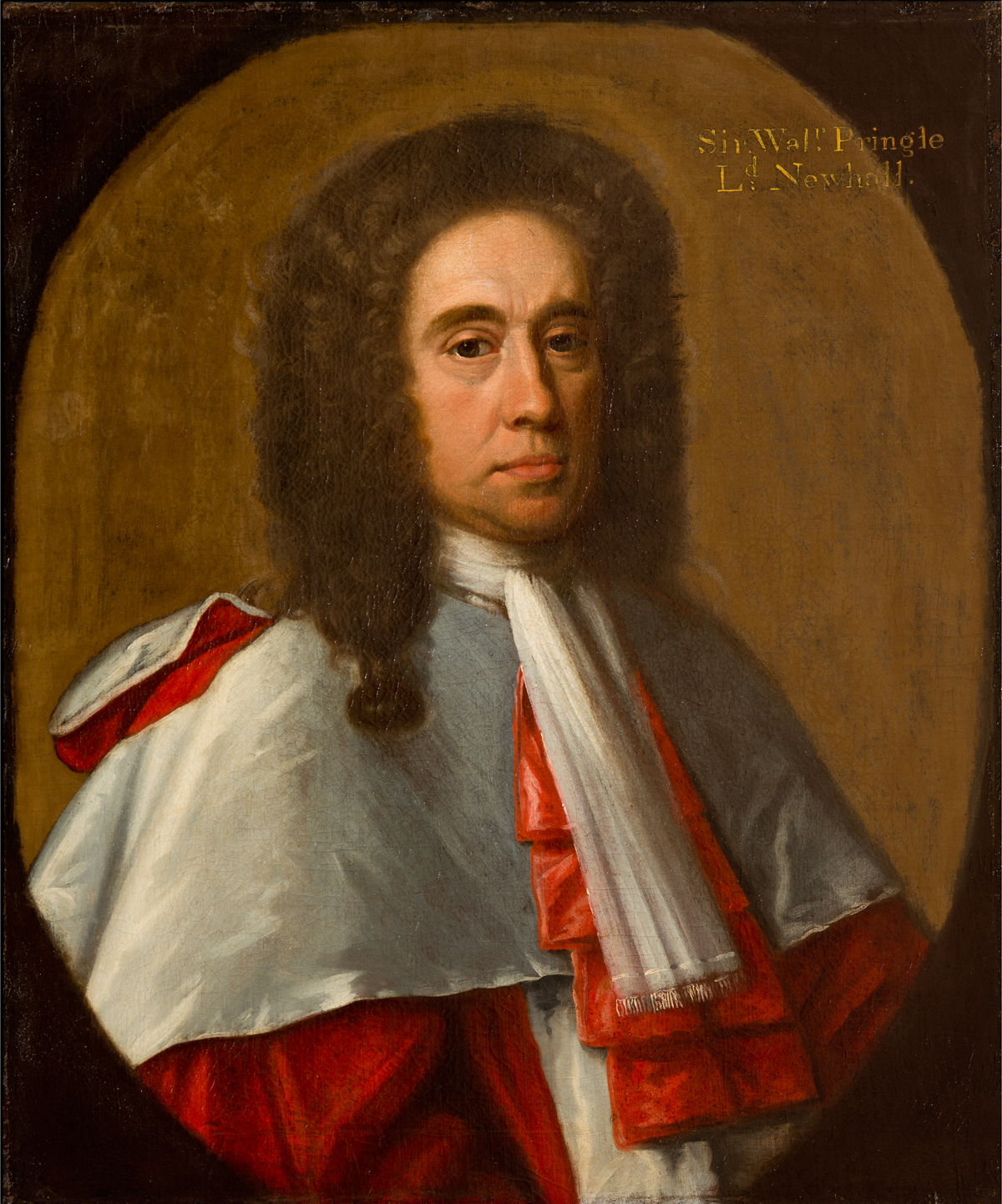
Walter Pringle

== Life ==
He was the second son of Sir Robert Pringle, 1st Baronet of Stitchel, and Margaret, daughter of John Hope, Lord Craighall; Walter Pringle of Greenknowe the Covenanter was his great-uncle. He was one of a family of nineteen children, thirteen of whom survived infancy. Two brothers, Thomas Pringle and Robert Pringle, became known, in law and politics, respectively.

Walter Pringle, born about 1664, succeeded to the estate of Lochton (Berwickshire). He was admitted advocate on 10 December 1687, and became one of the leaders of the Scottish bar. After the death of Sir Gilbert Elliot in 1718, Pringle was made a judge. On 6 June in that year he took his seat, with the title of Lord Newhall, was knighted at the same time, and was made a lord of justiciary.

== Death ==
On his death, on 14 December 1736, a special tribute was paid to Pringle's remains, his funeral being attended by his judicial colleagues in their robes of office. The Faculty of Advocates included in their minutes a eulogy on Pringle, written by Sir Robert Dundas of Arniston, then dean of faculty. His niece Katherine was married to William Hamilton of Bangour the poet, who wrote a verse epitaph.

== Family ==
Pringle married a daughter of Johnston of Hilton, and had issue. His direct line failed in the third generation, and his estate of Lochton fell to Sir John Pringle of Stitchel.

== Notes ==
Attribution

This article incorporates text from a publication now in the public domain: Lee, Sidney, ed. (1896). "Pringle, Walter (1664?-1736)". Dictionary of National Biography. Vol. 46. London: Smith, Elder & Co.
