= Hannover Club =

Early 18th century Whig political club

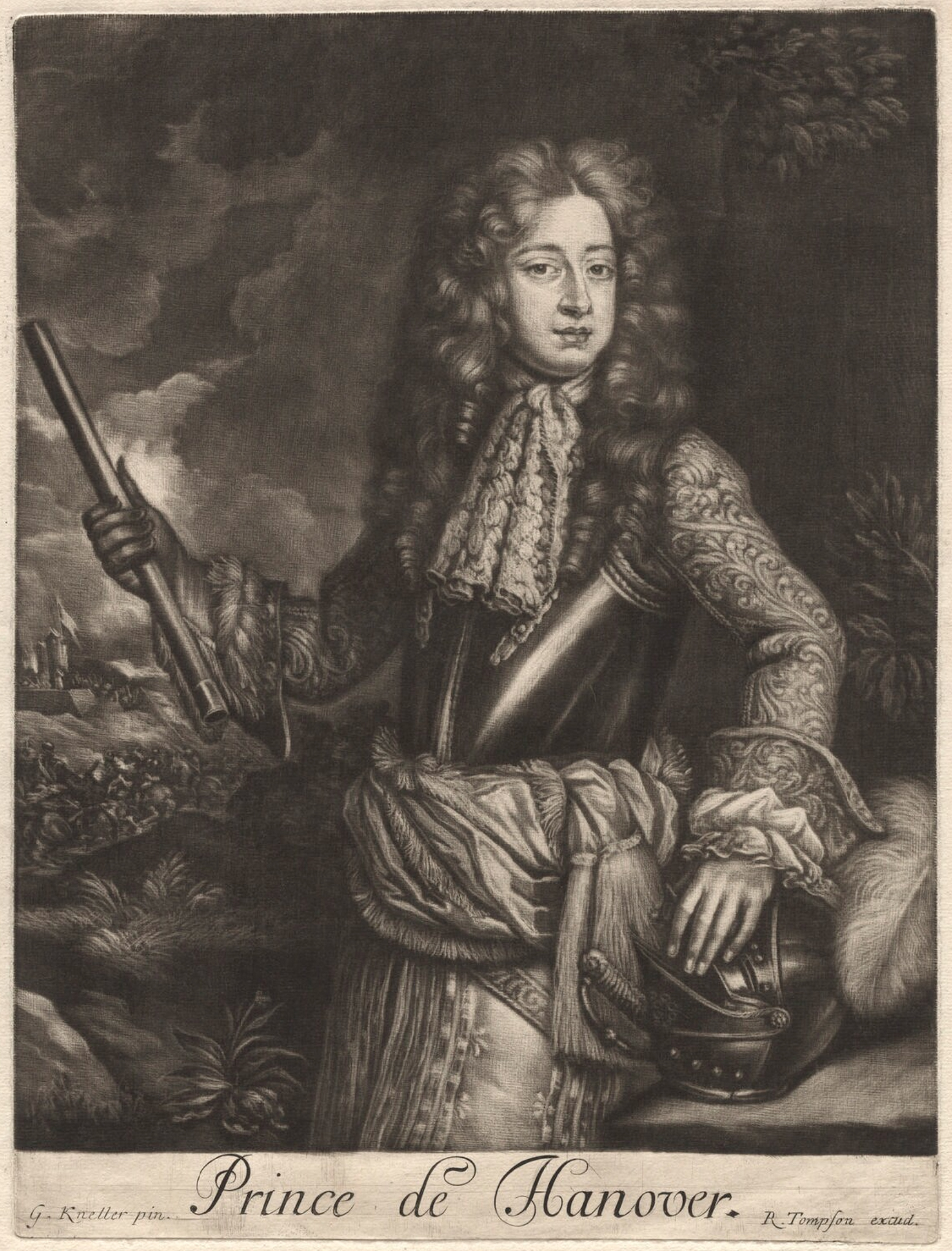
- The Hannover Club was established to secure the succession of George, Elector of Hanover, to the British throne
- Founded: 1711
- Dissolved: 1714 (or 1717)
- Ideology: Whiggism, Hanoverian succession
- Party affiliation: Whigs

The Hannover Club or Hanover Club was a political society in the Kingdom of Great Britain active during the early 18th century. They were committed to the succession of King George of Hanover to the British throne, rather than the rival claimant James III (known as the 'Old Pretender'). It was made up of supporters of the Whig faction.

== Hannover Club activity ==
Less known than the Kit Kat Club, with whom it shared many beliefs and members, the group was arguably more important and influential in pushing for the Hanoverian Succession and proved invaluable to George following the death of Queen Anne in 1714, and the year of turmoil that followed.

The group was established in 1711–12 by prominent British Whig politicians, peers, and MPs during the Harley ministry, which was suspected by Whigs of wanting to frustrate the Hanoverian succession. Unlike general social or dining fraternities of the era, the club functioned as an aggressive, highly organised political machine.

Members met weekly at Jenny Man's coffee house at Charing Cross during the final years of Queen Anne's reign. They synchronised voting blocks and designed legislative maneuvers to counteract Tory and Jacobite influence. Members coordinated speeches and policy debates to actively raise opposition within both the House of Lords and the House of Commons. The club also served as an ideological nexus where younger rising Whigs – such as Duke of Newcastle and William Pulteney – collaborated with established leaders of the Whig Junto. By November 1713, the club membership was 31: four peers and 23 members of parliament. Members included Horace Walpole, George Montagu, Paul Methuen, Robert Furnese, Sir Thomas Frankland, 3rd Baronet and Christopher Wandesford, 2nd Viscount Castlecomer. James Graham, 1st Duke of Montrose was the only recorded Scottish member of the group.

The club heavily leveraged literature and media to keep pro-Hanoverian and pro-Whig sentiment alive in London, Westminster, and the broader constituencies. The club's secretary was the prominent writer Ambrose Philips. Members frequently collaborated with essayist Richard Steele and other figures from the Kit-Cat Club to author pamphlets and political commentaries swaying public favor.

A successor Whig group calling itself the Hanoverian Succession met in London from May 1714 to January 1717. This group received no less than £1,700 in government funds and public donations to advance Whig interests in the City of London. For example, on 5 December 1715 James Craggs the Elder gave £500 to the club for use in the common council elections. The club also organised elaborate public 'pope burning' processions in which effigies of the Pope, the Devil and the Pretender were paraded around the City before being burnt at Charing Cross. The club appears to have stopped meeting by the time of the Whig Split in 1717.
