= Sir John Delaval, 3rd Baronet =

English politician (1654–1729)

Sir John Delaval, 3rd Baronet (7 November 1654 – 4 June 1729), was an English Whig politician.

He was the fifth son of Sir Ralph Delaval, 1st Baronet, and his wife Anne Leslie, daughter of the 1st Earl of Leven. Delaval succeeded his older brother Ralph as baronet in 1696.

Delaval sat as Member of Parliament (MP) for Morpeth from 1701 until 1705. Subsequently, he represented Northumberland in the Parliament of England until 1707 and then in the Parliament of Great Britain until 1708. Because of financial problems, he had to sell the family's estates to his cousin Admiral George Delaval. With his death in 1729, the baronetcy is presumed to have devolved to his son Thomas and thereafter to have become extinct.

Parliament of England
Preceded by Sir Richard Sandford; Sir Henry Belasyse	Member of Parliament for Morpeth; 1701–1705; With: Emanuel Howe	Succeeded by Sir Richard Sandford; Edmund Maine
Preceded by Sir Francis Blake; Bertram Stote	Member of Parliament for Northumberland; 1705–1707; With: Thomas Forster	Succeeded by Parliament of Great Britain
Parliament of Great Britain
Preceded by Parliament of England	Member of Parliament for Northumberland; 1707–1708; With: Thomas Forster	Succeeded by Thomas Forster; Earl of Hertford
Honorary titles
Preceded by Mark Shafto	Vice-Admiral of Northumberland; 1709–1729	Vacant Title next held by The Earl of Northumberland
Baronetage of England
Preceded by Ralph Delaval	Baronet of Seaton; 1696–1729	Succeeded by Thomas Delaval ?
