= List of acts of the Parliament of Ireland, 1741–1750 =

This is a list of acts of the Parliament of Ireland for the years from 1741 to 1750.

The number shown by each act's title is its chapter number. Acts are cited using this number, preceded by the years of the reign during which the relevant parliamentary session was held; thus the act concerning assay passed in 1783 is cited as "23 & 24 Geo. 3. c. 23", meaning the 23rd act passed during the session that started in the 23rd year of the reign of George III and which finished in the 24th year of that reign. Note that the modern convention is to use Arabic numerals in citations (thus "40 Geo. 3" rather than "40 Geo. III"). Acts of the reign of Elizabeth I are formally cited without a regnal numeral in the Republic of Ireland.

Acts passed by the Parliament of Ireland did not have a short title; however, some of these acts have subsequently been given a short title by acts of the Parliament of the United Kingdom, acts of the Parliament of Northern Ireland, or acts of the Oireachtas. This means that some acts have different short titles in the Republic of Ireland and Northern Ireland respectively. Official short titles are indicated by the flags of the respective jurisdictions.

A number of the acts included in this list are still in force in Northern Ireland or the Republic of Ireland. Because these two jurisdictions are entirely separate, the version of an act in force in one may differ from the version in force in the other; similarly, an act may have been repealed in one but not in the other.

A number of acts passed by the Parliament of England or the Parliament of Great Britain also extended to Ireland during this period.

== 15 Geo. 2 (1741) ==
The 8th session of the parliament of George II, which met from 6 October 1741 until 15 February 1742.

This session was also traditionally cited as 15 G. 2.

=== Public acts ===
Short title, or popular name	Citation	Royal assent
Long title
Import Duties Act 1741 (repealed)	15 Geo. 2. c. 1 (I)	23 December 1741
An Act for granting and continuing to his Majesty an additional duty on beer, ale, strong waters, wine, tobacco, and other goods and merchandizes herein mentioned. (Repealed by Statute Law Revision (Ireland) Act 1878 (41 & 42 Vict. c. 57))
Import Duties, Pensions Tax, and Loans Act 1741 (repealed)	15 Geo. 2. c. 2 (I)	23 December 1741
An act for granting to his Majesty a further additional duty on wine, silk, hops, china, earthen, japanned, or lacquered ware, and vinegar; and also a tax of four shillings in the pound on all salaries, profits of employments, fees, and pensions, to be applied to pay an interest of four pounds per cent. per annum upon the sum of one hundred and twenty five thousand pounds, part of the sum of three hundred thousand pounds, and an interest of five pounds per cent. per annum upon such part of the residue thereof as shall remain unpaid on the twenty fifth day of December one thousand seven hundred and forty one; and also to pay an interest of four pounds per cent. per annum upon a further sum not exceeding the sum of one hundred and twenty five thousand pounds, to be borrowed for the purposes herein mentioned, and towards the discharge of the said principal sums. (Repealed by Statute Law Revision (Ireland) Act 1878 (41 & 42 Vict. c. 57))
Revenue and Customs Frauds Act 1741 (repealed)	15 Geo. 2. c. 3 (I)	15 February 1742
An Act for continuing and amending several laws heretofore made relating to his Majesty's revenue, and the more effectual preventing frauds in his Majesty's customs and excise. (Repealed by Statute Law Revision (Ireland) Act 1878 (41 & 42 Vict. c. 57))
Oaths of Qualification (Indemnity) Act 1741 (repealed)	15 Geo. 2. c. 4 (I)	15 February 1742
An Act for allowing further time to persons in offices or employments to qualify themselves pursuant to an act, intituled, "An Act to prevent the further growth of popery." (Note: Popery Act 1703 (2 Anne c. 6 (I))) (Repealed by Statute Law Revision (Ireland) Act 1879 (42 & 43 Vict. c. 24))
Ecclesiastical Demesne Lands Act 1741 (repealed)	15 Geo. 2. c. 5 (I)	15 February 1742
An Act to enable archbishops and bishops to demise part of their demesne lands, and to change the scite of their mansion houses. (Repealed by Church of Ireland Acts Repeal Act 1851 (14 & 15 Vict. c. 71))
Expiring Statutes Continuance Act 1741 (repealed)	15 Geo. 2. c. 6 (I)	15 February 1742
An Act for continuing and amending several statutes now near expiring, and for other purposes therein mentioned. (Repealed by Statute Law Revision (Ireland) Act 1878 (41 & 42 Vict. c. 57))
Partnerships Regulation Act 1741	15 Geo. 2. c. 7 (I)	15 February 1742
An Act for the better Regulation of Partnerships to encourage the Trade and Manufactures of this Kingdom. (Repealed for the Republic of Ireland by Statute Law Revision (Pre-Union Irish Statutes) Act 1962 (No. 29))
Distress for Rent Act 1741^{(Republic of Ireland)}	15 Geo. 2. c. 8 (I)	15 February 1742
An Act for the more effectual securing the Payment of Rents, and preventing Frauds by Tenants.
Butchers and Graziers Act 1741 (repealed)	15 Geo. 2. c. 9 (I)	15 February 1742
An Act to explain and amend a clause in an act passed in this kingdom in the second year of the reign of her late Majesty Queen Anne, intituled, "An act to prohibit butchers from being graziers, and to redress several abuses in buying and selling of cattle, and in slaughtering and packing of beef, tallow, and hides." (Note: Sale of Livestock Act 1703 (2 Anne c. 15 (I))) (Repealed by Forestalling, Regrating, etc. Act 1844 (7 & 8 Vict. c. 24))
Mining Leases Act 1741^{(Republic of Ireland)}	15 Geo. 2. c. 10 (I)	15 February 1742
An Act for explaining and amending an act, intituled, "An act for the further encouragement of finding and working mines and minerals in this kingdom." (Note: Mining Leases Act 1723 (10 Geo. 1. c. 5 (I)))
Dublin, Cork, and Limerick Street Lights Act 1741 (repealed)	15 Geo. 2. c. 11 (I)	15 February 1742
An Act to revive and amend an act made in the sixth year of his late Majesty King George the first, intituled, "An act for erecting and continuing lights in the city of Dublin, and the several liberties adjoining, and also in the cities of Cork and Limerick, and liberties thereof," (Note: Dublin, Cork, and Limerick Street Lights Act 1719 (6 Geo. 1. c. 18 (I))) as far as the same relates to the liberties adjoining to the city of Dublin and to the cities of Cork and Limerick, and the liberties thereof. (Repealed by Statute Law Revision (Ireland) Act 1878 (41 & 42 Vict. c. 57))

=== Private acts ===
Short title, or popular name	Citation	Royal assent
Long title
Barry's Estate Act 1741	15 Geo. 2. c. 1 Pr. (I)	15 February 1742
An Act for vesting the estate of Henry Barry, late Lord Barry, of Santry, in trustees, to be sold for payment of his debts, and for other purposes therein mentioned.
Jacob's Estate Act 1741	15 Geo. 2. c. 2 Pr. (I)	15 February 1742
An Act for vesting part of the estate of John Jacob, late of Coolemore, in the county of Tipperary, esquire, deceased, in certain trustees, for sale thereof, in order to pay and discharge his debts and legacies.
Dublin Professorships of Physic Act 1741	15 Geo. 2. c. 3 Pr. (I)	15 February 1742
An Act for vacating the office of the king's professor of physic in Dublin upon the death or surrender of the present king's professor, and for erecting three professorships of physic in the said city instead thereof.

=== Sources ===
- "Acts of Parliament by Session: 1741". Irish Legislation Database. Queen's University Belfast.
- "Pre-Union Irish Statutes: 1741 Acts". Irish Statute Book. Attorney General of Ireland.

== 17 Geo. 2 (1743) ==
The 9th session of the parliament of George II, which met from 4 October 1743 until 9 February 1744.

This session was also traditionally cited as 17 G. 2.

=== Public acts ===
Short title, or popular name	Citation	Royal assent
Long title
Import Duties Act 1743 (repealed)	17 Geo. 2. c. 1 (I)	17 December 1742
An Act for granting and continuing to his Majesty an additional duty on beer, ale, strong waters, wine, tobacco, hides, and other goods and merchandizes herein mentioned. (Repealed by Statute Law Revision (Ireland) Act 1878 (41 & 42 Vict. c. 57))
Import Duties, Pensions Tax, and Loans Act 1743 (repealed)	17 Geo. 2. c. 2 (I)	17 December 1742
An Act for granting to his Majesty a further additional duty on wine, silk, hops, china, earthen, japanned, or lacquered ware, and vinegar; and also a tax of four shillings in the pound on all salaries, profits of employments, fees, and pensions, to be applied to pay an interest of five pounds per cent. per annum upon such part of the sum of one hundred thousand pounds, part of the sum of three hundred thousand pounds formerly raised, which shall remain unpaid on the twenty fifth day of December one thousand seven hundred and forty three; and also to pay an interest of four pounds per cent per annum upon such part of the sum of two hundred and fifty thousand pounds also formerly raised, as shall remain unpaid on the said twenty fifth day of December one thousand seven hundred and forty three, and towards the discharge of the said principal sums. (Repealed by Statute Law Revision (Ireland) Act 1878 (41 & 42 Vict. c. 57))
Hempen and Flaxen Manufactures Act 1743	17 Geo. 2. c. 3 (I)	17 December 1742
An Act for the further improvement of the hempen and flaxen manufactures, and to encourage the raising of flax-seed in this kingdom.
Transportation Act 1743	17 Geo. 2. c. 4 (I)	9 February 1744
An Act for the more effectual transportation of felons and vagabonds.
Slaughter of Cattle Act 1743^{(Republic of Ireland)}	17 Geo. 2. c. 5 (I)	9 February 1744
An Act to amend and make more effectual the laws to prevent the maiming, killing, and destroying of cattle, and to prevent frauds committed by butchers dressing meat for sale.
Shop Stealing and Robbery Act 1743 (repealed)	17 Geo. 2. c. 6 (I)	9 February 1744
An Act to take away the benefit of clergy from any person that shall by night or by day-time feloniously and privately steal any goods out of any shop, ware-house, tan-yard, drying-house, cellar, or out-house, though not adjoining to any dwelling-house, or off of quays; and to encourage persons to apprehend such felons and other robbers. (Repealed by Statute Law Revision (Ireland) Act 1878 (41 & 42 Vict. c. 57))
Revenue and Customs Frauds Act 1743	17 Geo. 2. c. 7 (I)	9 February 1744
An Act for continuing and amending several laws heretofore made relating to his Majesty's revenue, and for more effectual preventing frauds in his Majesty's customs and excise.
Truck Act 1743^{(Republic of Ireland)}	17 Geo. 2. c. 8 (I)	9 February 1744
An Act for continuing several statutes now near expiring, and for amending other statutes, and for other purposes therein mentioned.
Oaths of Qualification (Indemnity) Act 1743 (repealed)	17 Geo. 2. c. 9 (I)	9 February 1744
An Act for allowing further time to persons in offices or employments to qualify themselves pursuant to an act, intituled, "An Act to prevent the further growth of popery." (Note: Popery Act 1703 (2 Anne c. 6 (I))) (Repealed by Statute Law Revision (Ireland) Act 1878 (41 & 42 Vict. c. 57))
Burning of Land Act 1743 (repealed)	17 Geo. 2. c. 10 (I)	9 February 1744
An Act to prevent the pernicious Practice of burning Land, and for the more effectual destroying of Vermin. (Repealed by Landlord and Tenant Law Amendment (Ireland) Act 1860 (23 & 24 Vict. c. 154) and for the Republic of Ireland by Statute Law Revision (Pre-Union Irish Statutes) Act 1962 (No. 29))
Forgery and Ship Salvage Act 1743	17 Geo. 2. c. 11 (I)	9 February 1744
An Act for the amendment of the law in relation to forgery, and the salvage of ships and goods stranded.
Quarantine Act 1743 (repealed)	17 Geo. 2. c. 12 (I)	9 February 1744
An Act to oblige ships coming from places infected more effectually to perform their quarantine, and for the better preventing the plague being brought from foreign parts into Ireland, and to hinder the spreading of infection. (Repealed by Statute Law Revision (Ireland) Act 1878 (41 & 42 Vict. c. 57))
Toomevara to Limerick Road Act 1743 (repealed)	17 Geo. 2. c. 13 (I)	9 February 1744
An Act to explain, continue, amend, and make more effectual an act, intituled, "An Act for repairing the high road leading from the town of Tomivarah (Note: Toomevara, County Tipperary.) in the county of Tipperary to the town of Silver-mines, (Note: Silvermines, County Tipperary.) as also to the town of Nenagh, (Note: Nenagh, County Tipperary.) and from the said towns of Nenagh and Silver-mines by Shally-Orchard (Note: Shallee Orchard, County Tipperary.) through the town of Tullo (Note: Newport, County Tipperary.) in the said county to the city of Limerick." (Note: Toomevara to Limerick Road Act 1737 (11 Geo. 2. c. 18 (I))) (Repealed by Toomevara to Limerick Road Act 1795 (35 Geo. 3. c. 16 (I)))

=== Private acts ===
Short title, or popular name	Citation	Royal assent
Long title
Earl of Kerry's Estate Act 1743	17 Geo. 2. c. 1 Pr. (I)	9 February 1744
An Act for enabling the Right Honourable William, earl of Kerry, to make a good jointure of £600 a year, agreed by him to be settled on Gertrude, countess of Kerry, before his intermarriage with her.
Nicholson's Charitable Donations Act 1743	17 Geo. 2. c. 2 Pr. (I)	9 February 1744
An Act for regulating and rendering more effectual the charitable donations of Edward Nicholson, clerk, deceased.

=== Sources ===
- "Acts of Parliament by Session: 1743". Irish Legislation Database. Queen's University Belfast.

== 19 Geo. 2 (1745) ==
The 10th session of the parliament of George II, which met from 8 October 1745 until 11 April 1746.

This session was also traditionally cited as 19 G. 2.

=== Public acts ===
Short title, or popular name	Citation	Royal assent
Long title
The Pretender's Sons Attainder Act 1745 (repealed)	19 Geo. 2. c. 1 (I)	2 December 1745
An Act to make it high treason to hold correspondence with the sons of the Pretender to his Majesty's crown; and for attainting them of high treason in case they shall land, or attempt to land, in this kingdom, and to give a reward of fifty thousand pounds for every of them to any person or persons who shall seize and secure them, or any of them, if they or any of them shall land, or attempt to land, in this kingdom. (Repealed by Statute Law Revision (Ireland) Act 1878 (41 & 42 Vict. c. 57))
Import Duties and Prohibitions Act 1745 (repealed)	19 Geo. 2. c. 2 (I)	13 December 1745
An Act for granting and continuing to his Majesty an additional duty on beer, ale, strong waters, wine, tobacco, hides, and other goods and merchandizes herein mentioned; and for prohibiting the importation of all gold and silver lace, except of the manufacture of Great Britain. (Repealed by Statute Law Revision (Ireland) Act 1878 (41 & 42 Vict. c. 57))
Import Duties, Pensions Tax, and Loans Act 1745 (repealed)	19 Geo. 2. c. 3 (I)	13 December 1745
An Act for granting to his Majesty an additional duty on wine, silk, hops, china, earthen, japanned, or lacquered ware, and vinegar; and also a tax of four shillings in the pound on all salaries, profits of employments, fees and pensions, to be applied to pay an interest of five pounds per cent. per annum upon such part of the sum of one hundred thousand pounds, part of the sum of three hundred thousand pounds formerly raised, and to pay an interest of four pounds per cent. per annum upon such part of the sum of two hundred and fifty thousand pounds also formerly raised, as shall remain unpaid on the twenty fifth day of December one thousand seven hundred and forty five; as also to pay an interest of four pounds per cent. per annum upon a further sum not exceeding the sum of seventy thousand pounds to be borrowed for the purposes herein mentioned, and towards the discharge of the said principal sums. (Repealed by Statute Law Revision (Ireland) Act 1878 (41 & 42 Vict. c. 57))
Revenue and Customs Frauds Act 1745 (repealed)	19 Geo. 2. c. 4 (I)	11 April 1746
An Act for continuing and amending several laws heretofore made relating to his Majesty's revenue, and for the more effectual preventing of frauds in his Majesty's customs and excise. (Repealed by Statute Law Revision (Ireland) Act 1878 (41 & 42 Vict. c. 57))
Hawkers, Pedlars, and Protestant Schools Act 1745 (repealed)	19 Geo. 2. c. 5 (I)	11 April 1746
An Act for licensing hawkers and pedlars; and for the encouragement of English protestant schools. (Repealed by Statute Law Revision (Ireland) Act 1878 (41 & 42 Vict. c. 57))
Hempen and Flaxen Manufactures Act 1745	19 Geo. 2. c. 6 (I)	11 April 1746
An Act for repealing the several acts of Parliament made in this kingdom for the encouragement and improvement of the hempen and flaxen manufactures; and for the better regulating improving and encouraging the said manufactures.
Foreign Service and Foreign Education Act 1745 (repealed)	19 Geo. 2. c. 7 (I)	11 April 1746
An Act for the more effectual preventing his Majesty's Subjects from entering into foreign Service; and for publishing an Act of the seventh Year of King William the Third, intituled, "An Act to prevent foreign Education." (Note: Education Act 1695 (7 Will. 3. c. 4 (I))) (Repealed by Foreign Enlistment Act 1819 (59 Geo. 3. c. 69))
Oaths of Qualification (Indemnity) Act 1745 (repealed)	19 Geo. 2. c. 8 (I)	11 April 1746
An Act for allowing further time to persons in offices or employments to qualify themselves pursuant to an act, intituled, "An Act to prevent the further growth of popery." (Note: Popery Act 1703 (2 Anne c. 6 (I))) (Repealed by Statute Law Revision (Ireland) Act 1878 (41 & 42 Vict. c. 57))
Militia Act (Ireland) 1745 (repealed)	19 Geo. 2. c. 9 (I)	11 April 1746
An Act to continue and amend an act passed in the second year of the reign of his late Majesty King George the first, intituled, "An Act to make the militia of this kingdom more useful." (Note: Militia Act (Ireland) 1715 (2 Geo. 1. c. 9 (I))) (Repealed by Statute Law Revision (Ireland) Act 1878 (41 & 42 Vict. c. 57))
Juries Act 1745 (repealed)	19 Geo. 2. c. 10 (I)	11 April 1746
An Act for continuing and amending the several acts for the better regulating of juries. (Repealed by Statute Law Revision (Ireland) Act 1878 (41 & 42 Vict. c. 57))
Parliamentary Elections Regulation Act 1745	19 Geo. 2. c. 11 (I)	11 April 1746
An Act for the better regulating Elections of Members of Parliament.
Municipal Corporations Act 1745^{(Republic of Ireland)}	19 Geo. 2. c. 12 (I)	11 April 1746
An Act for the better regulating of corporations. (Repealed for Northern Ireland by Judicature (Northern Ireland) Act 1978 (c. 23))
Abductions Act 1745^{(Republic of Ireland)}	19 Geo. 2. c. 13 (I)	11 April 1746
An Act for annulling all Marriages to be celebrate by any Popish Priest between Protestant and Protestant, or between Protestant and Papist; and to amend and make more effectual an Act passed in this Kingdom in the sixth Year of the Reign of her late Majesty Queen Anne, intituled, "An Act for the more effectual preventing the taking away and marrying Children against the Wills of their Parents or Guardians." (Note: Abductions Act 1707 (6 Anne c. 16 (I)))
Game Preservation Act 1745 (repealed)	19 Geo. 2. c. 14 (I)	11 April 1746
An Act for explaining an act passed in the tenth year of his late Majesty King William the third, intituled, "An act for the preservation of the game and the more easy conviction of such as shall destroy the same." (Note: Deer Protection Act 1698 (10 Will. 3. c. 8 (I))) (Repealed by Statute Law Revision (Ireland) Act 1878 (41 & 42 Vict. c. 57))
Expiring Statutes Continuance Act 1745 (repealed)	19 Geo. 2. c. 15 (I)	11 April 1746
An Act for reviving and continuing several temporary statutes. (Repealed by Statute Law Revision (Ireland) Act 1878 (41 & 42 Vict. c. 57))
Ecclesiastical Lands and Churches Act 1745 (repealed)	19 Geo. 2. c. 16 (I)	11 April 1746
An Act for amending the laws in relation to demesne lands be longing to archbishops, and in relation to the building of new parish-churches. (Repealed by Church of Ireland Acts Repeal Act 1851 (14 & 15 Vict. c. 71))
Corn, Meal, and Bread Regulation Act 1745 (repealed)	19 Geo. 2. c. 17 (I)	11 April 1746
An Act for continuing and amending an act, intituled, "An Act for the buying and selling of all sorts of corn and meal, and other things therein mentioned, by weight; and for the more effectual preventing the frauds committed in the buying and selling thereof; and for regulating the price and assize of bread; and for better regulating the markets." (Note: Corn, Meal, and Bread Regulation Act 1737 (11 Geo. 2. c. 11 (I))) (Repealed by Statute Law Revision (Ireland) Act 1878 (41 & 42 Vict. c. 57))
Quakers Affirmation Act 1745 (repealed)	19 Geo. 2. c. 18 (I)	11 April 1746
An Act for accepting the solemn affirmation or declaration of the people called Quakers instead of an oath in the usual form. (Repealed by Promissory Oaths Act 1871 (34 & 35 Vict. c. 48))
Newcastle to Cork Road Act 1745	19 Geo. 2. c. 19 (I)	11 April 1746
An Act to continue and amend an act, intituled, "An Act for repairing the road leading from the town of New-castle (Note: Newcastle West, County Limerick.) in the county of Limerick to the city of Limerick, (Note: Limerick, County Limerick.) and from thence to the city of Cork." (Note: Cork, County Cork.) (Note: Newcastle, Limerick, and Cork Road Act 1731 (5 Geo. 2. c. 22 (I)))
Naas to Maryborough Road Act 1745	19 Geo. 2. c. 20 (I)	11 April 1746
An Act to explain, amend, and make more effectual an act made in the seventh year of his present Majesty, (Note: Naas to Maryborough Road Act 1733 (7 Geo. 2. c. 17 (I))) intituled, "An Act for making more effectual an act passed in the fifth year of the reign of his present Majesty King George the second, (Note: Naas to Maryborough Road Act 1731 (5 Geo. 2. c. 21 (I))) intituled, 'An Act for repairing the road leading from the town of Naas (Note: Naas, County Kildare.) in the county of Kildare to the town of Maryborough (Note: Portlaoise, County Laois.) in the Queen's-county.'"
Dublin Workhouse Act 1745	19 Geo. 2. c. 21 (I)	11 April 1746
An Act for continuing and amending the several laws relating to the work-house of the city of Dublin.

=== Private acts ===
Short title, or popular name	Citation	Royal assent
Long title
Sprigge's Estate Act 1745	19 Geo. 2. c. 1 Pr. (I)	11 April 1746
An Act for establishing and confirming a partition of certain lands lying in the King's county, counties of Kildare and Westmeath, late the estate of William Sprigge of Clonivoe in the King's county, esquire, deceased, agreed to be made between Sir Lawrence Parsons of Parsonstown in the King's county, baronet, and Thomas Burgh of Oldtown in the county of Kildare, esquire, and for enabling the said Sir Laurence Parsons to make one or more lease or leases for 31 years or three lives of his part of the said lands, and for other purposes therein mentioned.
Warren's Estate Act 1745	19 Geo. 2. c. 2 Pr. (I)	11 April 1746
An Act for sale of part of the estate of William Paul Warren, esquire, to discharge his debts and encumbrances, and for settling the rest of his estate, and for other purposes therein mentioned.
North Strand (Dublin) Enclosure Act 1745	19 Geo. 2. c. 3 Pr. (I)	11 April 1746
An Act for more the speedy and effectual enclosing and preserving the strand on the north side of the river Anna Liffey, near the city of Dublin.
Colclough's Creditors and Children Act 1745	19 Geo. 2. c. 4 Pr. (I)	11 April 1746
An Act for the relief of the creditors and the younger children of Caesar Colclough of Mocorry in the Co. Wexford, esquire, and for settling a maintenance on Vesey Colclough, grandson of the said Caesar, and for other purposes.

=== Sources ===
- "Acts of Parliament by Session: 1745". Irish Legislation Database. Queen's University Belfast.

== 21 Geo. 2 (1747) ==
The 11th session of the parliament of George II, which met from 6 October 1747 until 9 April 1748.

This session was also traditionally cited as 21 G. 2.

=== Public acts ===
Short title, or popular name	Citation	Royal assent
Long title
Import Duties and Prohibitions Act 1747 (repealed)	21 Geo. 2. c. 1 (I)	21 December 1747
An Act for granting and continuing to his Majesty an additional duty on beer, ale, strong waters, wine, tobacco, hides, and other goods and merchandizes therein mentioned; and for prohibiting the importation of all gold and silver lace, except of the manufacture of Great Britain. (Repealed by Statute Law Revision (Ireland) Act 1878 (41 & 42 Vict. c. 57))
Aids, Duties, and Pensions Tax Act 1747 (repealed)	21 Geo. 2. c. 2 (I)	21 December 1747
An Act for granting to his Majesty an additional duty on wine, silk, hops, china, earthen, japanned, or lacquered ware, and vinegar; and also a tax of four shillings in the pound on all salaries, profits of employments, fees, and pensions, to be applied to pay an interest of five pounds per cent. per annum upon such part of the fum of one hundred thousand pounds, part of the sum of three hundred thousand pounds formerly raised, and to pay an interest of four pounds per cent. per annum upon such part of the sum of two hundred and fifty thousand pounds also formerly raised, as shall remain unpaid on the twenty fifth day of December one thousand seven hundred and forty seven; as also to pay an interest of four pounds per cent. per annum for such part of the sum of seventy thousand pounds as hath been or shall be borrowed pursuant to an act passed the last session of Parliament, and towards the discharge of the said principal sums. (Repealed by Statute Law Revision (Ireland) Act 1878 (41 & 42 Vict. c. 57))
Hawkers, Pedlars, and Schools Act 1747 (repealed)	21 Geo. 2. c. 3 (I)	21 December 1747
An Act for licensing hawkers and pedlars; and for the encouragement of English protestant schools. (Repealed by Statute Law Revision (Ireland) Act 1878 (41 & 42 Vict. c. 57))
Revenue, Customs, and Excise Frauds Act 1747 (repealed)	21 Geo. 2. c. 4 (I)	9 April 1748
An Act for continuing and amending several laws heretofore made relating to his Majesty's revenue, and for the more effectual preventing of frauds in his Majesty's customs and excise. (Repealed by Statute Law Revision (Ireland) Act 1878 (41 & 42 Vict. c. 57))
Oaths of Qualification (Indemnity) Act 1747 (repealed)	21 Geo. 2. c. 5 (I)	9 April 1748
An Act for allowing further time to persons in offices or employments to qualify themselves pursuant to an act, intituled, "An Act to prevent the further growth of popery." (Note: Popery Act 1703 (2 Anne c. 6 (I))) (Repealed by Statute Law Revision (Ireland) Act 1878 (41 & 42 Vict. c. 57))
Juries Act 1747 (repealed)	21 Geo. 2. c. 6 (I)	9 April 1748
An Act for amending the several acts for the better regulating of juries. (Repealed by Statute Law Revision (Ireland) Act 1878 (41 & 42 Vict. c. 57))
Expiring Statutes Continuance (Ireland) Act 1747 (repealed)	21 Geo. 2. c. 7 (I)	9 April 1748
An Act for reviving, continuing and amending several temporary statutes. (Repealed by Statute Law Revision (Ireland) Act 1878 (41 & 42 Vict. c. 57))
Benefices and Cathedrals (Ireland) Act 1747 (repealed)	21 Geo. 2. c. 8 (I)	9 April 1748
An Act for disappropriating benefices belonging to deans, archdeacons, dignitaries, and other members of cathedral churches, and for appropriating others in their stead; and also for the removal of the scites of ruined cathedral churches. (Repealed by Statute Law Revision (Ireland) Act 1878 (41 & 42 Vict. c. 57))
Barracks and Lighthouses Act 1747 (repealed)	21 Geo. 2. c. 9 (I)	9 April 1748
An Act to amend and make more effectual an act passed in the fourth year of the reign of his late Majesty King George the first, (Note: Barracks and Lighthouses Act 1717 (4 Geo. 1. c. 7 (I))) intituled, "An Act for vesting in his Majesty, his heirs and successors, the several lands, tenements, and hereditaments, whereon the barracks in this kingdom are built, or building, or contracted for; and whereon light-houses are or shall be built, and for making reasonable satisfaction to the several owners and proprietors for the same; and likewise for amending an act made in the sixth year of her late Majesty's reign, (Note: Marching Soldiers Act 1707 (6 Anne c. 14 (I))) intituled, 'An Act to prevent the disorders that may happen by the marching of soldiers, and for providing carriages for the baggage of soldiers in their march.'" (Repealed by Statute Law Revision (Ireland) Act 1878 (41 & 42 Vict. c. 57))
Newtown Act 1747	21 Geo. 2. c. 10 (I)	9 April 1748
An Act to amend and make more effectual an Act, intituled, "An Act for better regulating Elections of Members to serve in Parliament," (Note: Parliamentary Elections Regulation Act 1745 (19 Geo. 2. c. 11 (I))) and for the more effectual quieting of Corporations, and securing the Rights of Persons, who have been or shall be elected into the Offices of Alderman and Burgesses within any Corporation of this Kingdom.
Fines, Recoveries, and Chancery Sales Act 1747 (repealed)	21 Geo. 2. c. 11 (I)	9 April 1748
An Act for amending the laws in relation to fines and common recoveries; and for better securing the rights of purchasers under sales made in pursuance of decrees in the several courts of equity in this kingdom. (Repealed by Statute Law Revision (Ireland) Act 1878 (41 & 42 Vict. c. 57))
Assaults with Intent to Robbery Act 1747 (repealed)	21 Geo. 2. c. 12 (I)	9 April 1748
An Act for the more effectual punishment of assaults, with intent to commit robbery. (Repealed by Criminal Statutes (Ireland) Repeal Act 1828 (9 Geo. 4. c. 53))
Cork to Killarney Roads and Gads Act 1747	21 Geo. 2. c. 13 (I)	9 April 1748
An Act for repairing the roads leading from the city of Corke (Note: Cork, County Cork.) through Mill-street (Note: Millstreet, County Cork.) to Shannah-Mill (Note: Shinnagh Mill, County Kerry.) in the county of Kerry, and from Shannah-Mill to Killarny; (Note: Killarney, County Kerry.) as also from Shannah-Mill through Castle-Island (Note: Castleisland, County Kerry.) to Listowell (Note: Listowel, County Kerry.) in the said county; and for laying an additional toll at all turnpikes in this kingdom on all carrs and carriages, making use of any part of saplin or trees as, or for a bow or backband, or making use of any saplins twisted into gads for backbands, halters, traces to draw by, or gads commonly called long gads.

=== Private acts ===
Short title, or popular name	Citation	Royal assent
Long title
Dr Steevens' Hospital and St. Patrick's Hospital Site Act 1747	21 Geo. 2. c. 1 Pr. (I)	9 April 1747
An Act for enabling the governors and guardians of the hospital founded by Dr Richard Steevens, to grant a piece of ground in fee-farm to the governors of St. Patrick's Hospital, Dublin, for the site of that hospital.
Lowther's Divorce Act 1747	21 Geo. 2. c. 2 Pr. (I)	9 April 1747
An Act to dissolve the marriage of Gorges Lowther of Killrew in the Co. of Meath, esquire, with Judith Usher, and to enable him to marry again, and for other purposes therein mentioned.
Viscountess Dowager Molesworth's Estate Act 1747	21 Geo. 2. c. 3 Pr. (I)	9 April 1747
An Act to enable the Right Honourable Mary, Viscountess Dowager Molesworth, to make a lease or leases of certain messuages, curtillages and gardens in the lord chief baron's yard, and on the Blind-Quay, in the city of Dublin, for the term of 99 years.
Harrison's Estate and Creditors Agreement Act 1747	21 Geo. 2. c. 4 Pr. (I)	9 April 1747
An Act to confirm and carry into execution certain articles of agreement entered into by and between Abraham Creichton, esquire, on behalf of himself and of Elizabeth Creichton, otherwise Rogerson, his wife, David Rogerson Creichton, John Creichton and Abraham Creichton, sons of the said Abraham Creichton and Elizabeth, his wife, all infants under the age of 21 years, and William Todd, esquire, on behalf of himself and Frances Joanna Todd otherwise Columbine, his wife, concerning such residue of the real and personal estate of Francis Harrison, esquire, deceased, as shall remain unsold and indisposed of, after the full execution of the trusts relating to the said real and personal estate, mentioned and contained in an act, made in the 7th year of his majesty's reign, (Note: Burton and Falkiner Banks Creditors Act 1733 (7 Geo. 2. c. 26 (I))) entitled, "An Act for the relief of the creditors of the bank lately kept by Samuel Burton and Daniel Falkner, and of the creditors of the bank lately kept by Benjamin Burton, Samuel Burton and Daniel Falkner, and of the creditors of the bank lately kept by Benjamin Burton and Samuel Burton, and of the creditors of the bank lately kept by Benjamin Burton and Francis Harrison," and in one other act, made in the 9th year of his majesty's reign, (Note: Burton and Falkiner Banks Creditors Act 1735 (9 Geo. 2. c. 27 (I))) entitled, "An Act for continuing and amending an act for the relief of the creditors of the bank lately kept by Samuel Burton and Daniel Falkner, and of the creditors of the bank lately kept by Benjamin Burton, Samuel Burton and Daniel Falkner, and of the creditors of the bank lately kept by Benjamin Burton and Samuel Burton, and of the creditors of the bank lately kept by Benjamin Burton and Francis Harrison."
Dixon's Estate Act 1747	21 Geo. 2. c. 5 Pr. (I)	9 April 1747
An Act for sale of part of the estate, late of Colonel Robert Dixon, of Calverstown, in the county of Kildare, deceased, for payment of debts and legacies affecting the said estate.
Bingham's Estate Act 1747	21 Geo. 2. c. 6 Pr. (I)	9 April 1747
An Act for vesting part of the estate of John Bingham of Newbrook in the County Mayo, esquire, in trustees, for raising, by sale thereof, money to pay off the debts and encumbrances affecting the same.
Bell's Estate Act 1747	21 Geo. 2. c. 7 Pr. (I)	9 April 1747
An Act for sale of so much of the estate of Lyndon Bell, of Streamstown, in the county Mayo, esquire, as will be sufficient to pay the debts, legacies and encumbrances affecting the same.
Walsh's Entail Act 1747	21 Geo. 2. c. 8 Pr. (I)	9 April 1747
An Act for establishing a fine acknowledged and a recovery suffered by John Walsh, esquire, and Edward Walsh, esquire, his son and heir apparent, in Hilary term, 1732.

=== Sources ===
- "Acts of Parliament by Session: 1747". Irish Legislation Database. Queen's University Belfast.

== 23 Geo. 2 (1749) ==
The 12th session of the parliament of George II, which met from 10 October 1749 until 14 April 1750.

This session was also traditionally cited as 23 G. 2.

=== Public acts ===
Short title, or popular name	Citation	Royal assent
Long title
Duties on Beer, etc. Act 1749 (repealed)	23 Geo. 2. c. 1 (I)	23 December 1749
An Act for granting and continuing to his Majesty an additional duty on beer, ale, strong waters, wine, tobacco, hides, and other goods and merchandizes herein mentioned; and for prohibiting the importation of all gold and silver lace, except of the manufacture of Great Britain. (Repealed by Statute Law Revision (Ireland) Act 1879 (42 & 43 Vict. c. 24))
National Debt and Taxation Act 1749 (repealed)	23 Geo. 2. c. 2 (I)	23 December 1749
An Act for payment of the principal sums of seventy thousand pounds and fifty eight thousand five hundred pounds in discharge of so much of the national debt; and for granting to his Majesty an additional duty on wine, silk, hops, china, earthen, japanned, or lacquered ware, and vinegar; and also a tax of four shillings in the pound on all salaries, profits of employments, fees, and pensions; to be applied to discharge the interest of the said principal sums, until the same shall be paid; and also to pay an interest of four pounds per centum per annum for the sum of two hundred and fifty thousand pounds, which will remain due after the payments aforesaid, and an interest of four pounds per centum per annum for such further sums, as may hereafter be borrowed pursuant to an act (Note: Import Duties, Pensions Tax, and Loans Act 1745 (19 Geo. 2. c. 3 (I))) passed in the nineteenth year of his present Majesty's reign, and towards the discharge of the said principal sum of two hundred and fifty thousand pounds. (Repealed by Statute Law Revision (Ireland) Act 1879 (42 & 43 Vict. c. 24))
Revenue and Frauds Act 1749 (repealed)	23 Geo. 2. c. 3 (I)	14 April 1750
An Act for continuing and amending several laws heretofore made relating to his Majesty's revenue, and for the more effectual preventing of frauds in his Majesty's customs and excise. (Repealed by Statute Law Revision (Ireland) Act 1879 (42 & 43 Vict. c. 24))
Hawkers and Pedlars (Ireland) Act 1749 (repealed)	23 Geo. 2. c. 4 (I)	14 April 1750
An Act for licensing hawkers and pedlars; and for the encouragement of English protestant schools. (Repealed by Statute Law Revision (Ireland) Act 1879 (42 & 43 Vict. c. 24))
Carriage and Stamp Duties Act 1749 (repealed)	23 Geo. 2. c. 5 (I)	14 April 1750
An Act for granting and continuing to his Majesty several duties upon coaches, berlins, chariots, calashes, chaises, and chairs, and upon cards and dice, and upon wrought and manufactured gold and silver plate, for the purposes herein mentioned. (Repealed by Statute Law Revision (Ireland) Act 1879 (42 & 43 Vict. c. 24))
Flax and Hempen Manufactures (Ireland) Act 1749	23 Geo. 2. c. 6 (I)	14 April 1750
An Act for the further improvement and encouragement of the flaxen and hempen manufactures.
Popery Act 1749 (repealed)	23 Geo. 2. c. 7 (I)	14 April 1750
An Act for allowing further time to persons in offices or employments to qualify themselves pursuant to an act, intituled, "An act to prevent the further growth of popery." (Note: Popery Act 1703 (2 Anne c. 6 (I))) (Repealed by Statute Law Revision (Ireland) Act 1879 (42 & 43 Vict. c. 24))
Expiring Laws Continuance Act 1749 (repealed)	23 Geo. 2. c. 8 (I)	14 April 1750
An Act for continuing several temporary statutes. (Repealed by Statute Law Revision (Ireland) Act 1879 (42 & 43 Vict. c. 24))
Mining Leases Act 1749^{(Republic of Ireland)}	23 Geo. 2. c. 9 (I)	14 April 1750
An Act for explaining and amending an act, intituled, "An act for the further encouragement of finding and working mines and minerals within this kingdom." (Note: Mining Leases Act 1723 (10 Geo. 1. c. 5 (I)))
Marriage Act 1749	23 Geo. 2. c. 10 (I)	14 April 1750
An Act for explaining and making more effectual an Act, intituled, "An Act for the more effectual preventing clandestine Marriages;" (Note: Marriage Act 1735 (9 Geo. 2. c. 11 (I))) and another Act passed in the twelfth Year of his late Majesty's Reign, intituled, "An Act to prevent Marriages by degraded Clergymen and Popish Priests, and for preventing Marriages consummated from being avoided by Pre-Contracts, and for the more effectual punishing of Bigamy." (Note: Marriage Act 1725 (12 Geo. 1. c. 3 (I)))
Dublin Beggars and Charity Schools Act 1749 (repealed)	23 Geo. 2. c. 11 (I)	14 April 1750
An Act to provide for begging children, and for the better regulation of charity schools, and for taking up vagrant and offensive beggars in the city of Dublin and liberties thereof, and the liberties thereto adjoyning. (Repealed by Statute Law Revision (Ireland) Act 1879 (42 & 43 Vict. c. 24))
Recovery of Tithes and Parish Clerks Act 1749	23 Geo. 2. c. 12 (I)	14 April 1750
An Act for amending continuing and making more effectual the several acts now in force in this kingdom for the more easy recovery of tythes, and other ecclesiastical dues of small value; and also for the more easy providing a maintenance for parish clerks.
Sheriffs Act 1749	23 Geo. 2. c. 13 (I)	14 April 1750
An Act for the better securing the Persons, who have served or hereafter shall serve in the Office of Sheriff in this Kingdom, against the Defaults and Neglects of their Sub-sheriffs and Attornies. (Repealed for the Republic of Ireland by Statute Law Revision (Pre-Union Irish Statutes) Act 1962 (No. 29))
Constables (Amendment) Act 1749 (repealed)	23 Geo. 2. c. 14 (I)	14 April 1750
An Act for amendment of the law, in relation to the appointing high and petty constables. (Repealed by Statute Law Revision (Ireland) Act 1879 (42 & 43 Vict. c. 24))
Sale of Livestock Act 1749	23 Geo. 2. c. 15 (I)	14 April 1750
An Act for continuing and amending an Act passed in the tenth Year of the Reign of His late Majesty King George the First, intituled, "An Act regulating Abuses committed in buying and selling of Cattle and Sheep in the several Markets in this Kingdom." (Note: Sale of Livestock Act 1723 (10 Geo. 1. c. 10 (I))) (Repealed for the Republic of Ireland by Statute Law Revision (Pre-Union Irish Statutes) Act 1962 (No. 29))
Turnpike Roads Act 1749 (repealed)	23 Geo. 2. c. 16 (I)	14 April 1750
An Act for the more effectual amending and keeping in repair the several turnpike roads in this kingdom; and for better securing the creditors of the said roads. (Repealed by Statute Law Revision (Ireland) Act 1879 (42 & 43 Vict. c. 24))
Insolvent Debtors Relief Act 1749 (repealed)	23 Geo. 2. c. 17 (I)	14 April 1750
An Act for the relief of insolvent debtors. (Repealed by Statute Law Revision (Ireland) Act 1879 (42 & 43 Vict. c. 24))
Mercer's Hospital Act 1749^{(Republic of Ireland)}	23 Geo. 2. c. 18 (I)	14 April 1750
An Act for regulating the hospital founded by Mary Mercer, spinster.
St. Mary's Parish Act 1749^{(Republic of Ireland)}	23 Geo. 2. c. 19 (I)	14 April 1750
An Act for dividing the parish of Saint Mary within the city and suburbs of Dublin into two distinct parishes.

=== Private acts ===
Short title, or popular name	Citation	Royal assent
Long title
Steuart's Estate Act 1749	23 Geo. 2. c. 1 Pr. (I)	14 April 1750
An Act for vesting part of the estate of William Steuart of the Castle of Baillyburrow in the Co. Cavan, esquire, in trustees, for raising, by sale thereof, the sum of £4000, charged upon the said estate for the portion of Rebecca Eccles otherwise Steuart, his sister, by the last will and testament of Charles Stuart, esquire, deceased, his father.
Warren's Estate Act 1749	23 Geo. 2. c. 2 Pr. (I)	14 April 1750
An Act to enable Robert Warren and William Warren, esquires, to come to a partition or division of several lands, tenements, and hereditaments in the county of Cork and in the city of Cork.

=== Sources ===
- "Acts of Parliament by Session: 1749". Irish Legislation Database. Queen's University Belfast.
- "Pre-Union Irish Statutes: 1749 Acts". Irish Statute Book. Attorney General of Ireland.

== See also ==
- List of acts of the Parliament of Ireland
- List of acts of the Oireachtas
- List of legislation in the United Kingdom
