= John Bennett (English barrister) =

Sir John Bennett (c. 1658 – 21 December 1723), of Essex Buildings, Essex Street, Westminster, was a British lawyer and Whig politician who sat in the House of Commons from 1708 to 1710.

== Early life ==
Bennett was the eldest son of John Bennett of St Paul's, Covent Garden, Westminster and Witham, Essex and his wife Sarah. In 1670, he succeeded his father. He was admitted at Greys Inn in 1675 and was called to the bar in 1683. On 9 January 1683 he married Anne Dudson (with £1,000), widow of Thomas Dudson, woollen-draper, of St Benet's, Gracechurch Street, London, and daughter of Sir Joseph Brand of Edwardstone, Suffolk.

== Career ==
Bennett received as succession of legal posts in the Duchy of Lancaster, which he probably owed to Henry Bennett, 1st Earl of Arlington. For the Duchy, he was attorney for the court in 1678, deputy south auditor from 1678 to 168, clerk of council from 1678 to 1685, and clerk of revenue from 1685 onwards. He was steward for Essex, Hertfordshire and Middlesex from 1697, judge of Marshalsea court from 1699 and bailiff, Salford hundred from 1699, all for the rest of his life. In 1705 became serjeant-at-law. He was knighted on 10 July 1706.

Bennett was returned unopposed as Whig Member of Parliament (MP) for Morpeth at the 1708 British general election on the interest of the 2nd Lord Ossulston. He supported the naturalization of the Palatines in 1709 and voted for the impeachment of Dr Sacheverell in 1710, but was otherwise an inactive Member. He did not stand at the 1710 British general election or after.

== Death and legacy ==
Bennett's wife died in 1722, and he died on 21 December 1723 and was buried at Witham nine days later. They had four sons and two daughters, one of whom predeceased him. He was succeeded by his eldest son. His sons followed him into the law but not into Parliament. Two of his sons became masters of chancery, and one of them was appointed clerk of the custodies in 1714. His only surviving daughter married John Vaughan, 2nd Viscount Lisburne MP.

Parliament of Great Britain
Preceded by Sir Richard Sandford; Edmund Maine	Member of Parliament for Morpeth; 1708–1710; With: Sir Richard Sandford	Succeeded by Sir Richard Sandford; Christopher Wandesford
