= Edmund Maine =

Lieutenant-General Edmund Maine (20 January 1633 – 25 April 1711) was an English soldier and politician.

== Life ==
He was a lieutenant-colonel of a cavalry unit in Scotland in 1679. He then served as lieutenant-colonel under John Churchill with the Troops of Horse Guards fighting at the Battle of Sedgemoor in 1685. He later served as commander-in-chief of the third troop of Life Guards in Ireland.

From 1702 to 1711 he served as governor of Berwick-upon-Tweed.

=== MP ===
He was a Member of Parliament (MP) for Morpeth from 1705 to 1708. While MP, he paid for the production of 6 bells as a gift for Morpeth Clock Tower in 1706.

He died aged 78.

Military offices
Vacant Title last held by Richard Leveson	Governor of Berwick-upon-Tweed; 1702–1711	Succeeded by Sir Henry Belasyse
Parliament of Great Britain
Preceded by Emanuel Howe; Sir John Delaval	Member of Parliament for Morpeth; 1705–1708; With: Sir Richard Sandford	Succeeded by Sir Richard Sandford; John Bennett
