= Oley Douglas =

British Member of Parliament

Oley Douglas (21 March 1684 – 9 November 1719) was a British Member of Parliament.

He was the eldest surviving son of John Douglas of Westgate, Newcastle upon Tyne, and East Matfen and Halton, Northumberland and entered Gray's Inn in 1703, where he was called to the bar in 1710.

He was a Member of Parliament (MP) for Morpeth, Northumberland from 1713 to 1715.

He died aged 35 in 1719. He had married in 1718, Mary, the daughter of Richard Harris, a London merchant, and had one daughter.

Parliament of Great Britain
Preceded by Sir Richard Sandford; Christopher Wandesford	Member of Parliament for Morpeth; 1713–1715; With: Sir John Germain	Succeeded by Viscount Morpeth; The Viscount Castlecomer
