= Christopher Wandesford, 1st Viscount Castlecomer =

English politician

Christopher Wandesford, 1st Viscount Castlecomer (19 August 1656 – 15 September 1707) was an Anglo-Irish politician and peer.

Wandesford was the son and heir of Sir Christopher Wandesford, 1st Baronet of Kirklington, Yorkshire, by his wife Eleanor Lowther, daughter of Sir John Lowther, 1st Baronet. He was educated at the University of Cambridge. His grandfather, the first Christopher Wandesford, had been briefly Lord Deputy of Ireland in 1640 and acquired substantial lands in County Kilkenny.

Wandesford held the office of Member of Parliament for Ripon between 1679 and 1681. He succeeded to his father's baronetcy in February 1687. He was High Sheriff of Yorkshire in 1689 and 1690. As an opponent of James II, on 7 May 1689 he was attainted in the Parliament of Ireland and had his estates seized. However, following the defeat of the Jacobite army in Ireland, he was richly rewarded by William III. He subsequently served as the MP for St Canice in Ireland between 1692 and 1706, when he was raised to the peerage. He became a member of the Privy Council of Ireland on 10 May 1695. In 1697 he was Colonel (United Kingdom)#Colonel of the Richmondshire Regiment, North Riding Militia.

He was elevated to the peerage when he was created Viscount Castlecomer and Baron Wandesford in the Peerage of Ireland on 15 March 1706. He died in September the following year.

He married Elizabeth Montagu, the sister of Charles Montagu, 1st Earl of Halifax, and together they had five children. He was succeeded by his eldest son, also Christopher.

Parliament of England
Preceded by Sir Edmund Jennings; Richard Sterne	Member of Parliament for Ripon; 1679–1681; With: Richard Sterne	Succeeded by Sir Edmund Jennings; Sir Gilbert Dolben
Parliament of Ireland
Preceded by William Flower; Oliver Wheeler	Member of Parliament for St Canice; 1692–1706; With: Richard Connell	Succeeded by Richard Connell; Hon. Christopher Wandesford
Honorary titles
Preceded by Sir Jonathan Jennings	High Sheriff of Yorkshire; 1690	Succeeded by Henry Fairfax
Peerage of Ireland
New creation	Viscount Castlecomer; 1706–1707	Succeeded by Christopher Wandesford
Baronetage of England
Preceded by Christopher Wandesford	Baronet (of Kirklington); 1687–1707	Succeeded by Christopher Wandesford
