= Edmund Jennings (Member of Parliament) =

English politician

Sir Edmund Jennings (1626 – September 1691) was an English politician who sat in the House of Commons at various times between 1659 and 1691.

== Life ==
Jennings was born at Scotton, the son of Jonathan Jennings of Ripon, West Riding of Yorkshire and was baptised at Farnham, Yorkshire on 30 November 1626. He attended schools at Silsden and Ripon in the West Riding of Yorkshire. He was admitted at Sidney Sussex College, Cambridge on 7 May 1641. He was admitted at Lincoln's Inn on 6 October 1646.

In 1659, Jennings was elected Member of Parliament for Ripon in the Third Protectorate Parliament. In 1660, he was elected MP for Ripon in the Convention Parliament. He was re-elected MP for Ripon in 1673 for the Cavalier Parliament and sat until 1679. He was High Sheriff of Yorkshire in 1675. He was re-elected MP for Ripon in 1685 and sat until 1687 and in 1690 and sat until 1691.

Jennings died at the age of 64.

Jennings married Margaret Barkham, daughter of Sir Edward Barkham, 1st Baronet, of South Acre and of Tottenham High Cross, Middlesex. Their third son, also Edmund and who like his father and grandfather became a lawyer, emigrated to the Virginia colony, where he served as the colony's Attorney General, as well as in both houses of the legislature, and briefly as the colony's Governor.

Parliament of England
Preceded by Not represented in Second Protectorate Parliament	Member of Parliament for Ripon; 1659; With: Jonathan Jennings	Succeeded by Not represented in restored Rump
Vacant Not represented in the restored Rump	Member of Parliament for Ripon; 1660 – 1661; With: Henry Arthington	Succeeded by Thomas Burwell; Sir John Nicholas
Preceded by Sir John Nicholas; Thomas Burwell	Member of Parliament for Ripon; 1673 – 1679; With: Sir John Nicholas; Richard Sterne	Succeeded by Christopher Wandesford; Richard Sterne
Preceded by Christopher Wandesford; Richard Sterne	Member of Parliament for Ripon; 1685 – 1689; With: Sir Gilbert Dolben, Bt	Succeeded by Sir Jonathan Jennings; Sir Edward Blackett, Bt
Preceded by Sir Jonathan Jennings; Sir Edward Blackett, Bt	Member of Parliament for Ripon; 1690 – 1691; With: Sir Jonathan Jennings	Succeeded by Sir Jonathan Jennings; Jonathan Jennings (2)
