= Diocese of Ferns =

Diocese of Ferns can refer to:

- The Diocese of Ferns (Catholic)
- The former Church of Ireland diocese of Ferns, now within the Diocese of Cashel and Ossory

== See also ==
- The Bishop of Ferns, a Roman Catholic bishop in Ireland
- The Bishop of Ferns and Leighlin, a former Episcopalisan bishop in Ireland
