= Sandford baronets =

Extinct baronetcy in the Baronetage of England

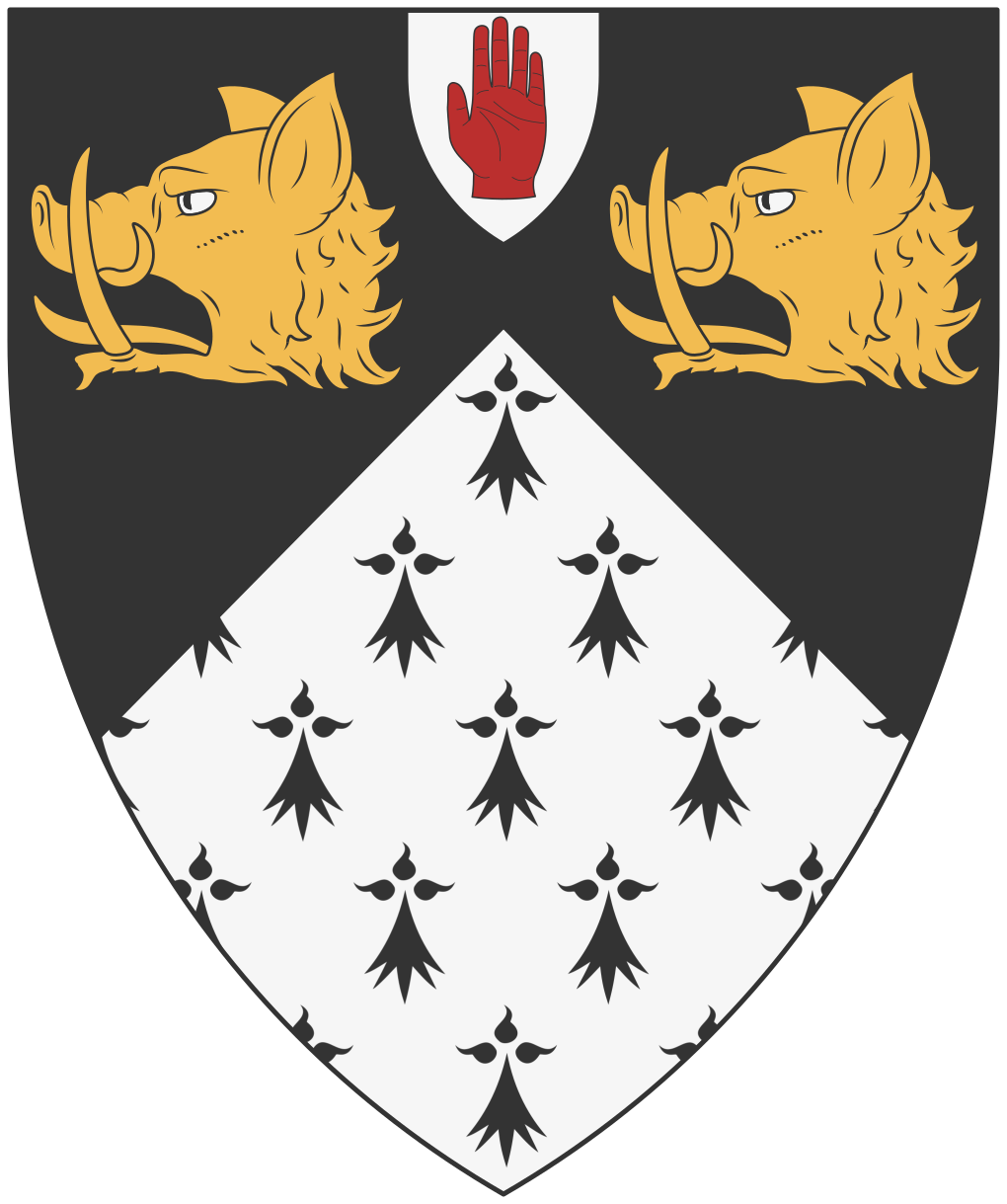
The coat of arms of the Sandfords of Howgill

The Sandford Baronetcy, of Howgill in the County of London, was a title in the Baronetage of England. It was created on 11 August 1641 for Thomas Sandford, subsequently Member of Parliament for Cockermouth. The second Baronet was murdered on 8 September 1675, the same day his son Richard, the third Baronet, was born. The third Baronet later represented Westmorland, Morpeth and Appleby in Parliament. The title became extinct on his death in 1723.

== Sandford baronets, of Howgill (1641) ==
- Sir Thomas Sandford, 1st Baronet (died c. 1655)
- Sir Richard Sandford, 2nd Baronet (died 1675)
- Sir Richard Sandford, 3rd Baronet (1675–1723)
