= Sir Richard Sandford, 3rd Baronet =

English landowner and Whig politician

Sir Richard Sandford, 3rd Baronet (8 September 1675 – 2 April 1723) was an English landowner and Whig politician who sat in the English House of Commons between 1695 and 1707, and in the British House of Commons from 1708 to 1723.

== Early life ==
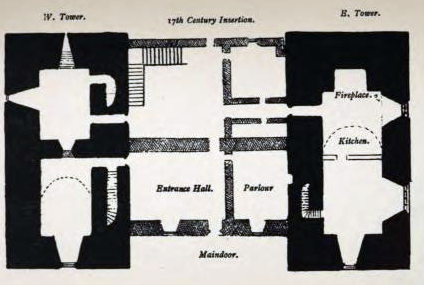
Plan of Howgill Castle

Sandford was the only son of Sir Richard Sandford, 2nd Baronet, of Howgill Castle, Westmorland and his wife Mary Bowes, daughter of Sir Francis Bowes of Thornton, County Durham. His father was murdered in the White Friars, London on the day, and even - it was said - the hour, of his son's birth. His attackers Henry Symbal and William Jones were executed shortly after. He entered Christ's College, Cambridge in 1692.

== Political career ==
Sandford was chosen by Sir John Lowther, 2nd Baronet, as his partner for Westmorland at the 1695 general election although under age, and was returned as Member of Parliament (MP) unopposed. He was returned unopposed again at Westmorland in 1698. He was selected as Mayor of Appleby for the year 1700 to 1701. There was a contest at Westmorland in January 1701 at which he was defeated. He was then returned, on the interest of Lord Carlisle, at Morpeth at a by-election on 31 May 1701. He was elected MP for Westmorland again in December 1701 but was defeated there at the 1702 general election. He turned to Morpeth again in 1705 and was returned there unopposed at the 1705 general election and in 1708 and 1710. At the 1713 general election he was elected in contest as MP for Appleby. He was appointed Warden of the Mint in 1714 and held the post until 1717.

Sandford was returned unopposed for Appleby in the 1715 and 1722 general elections.

== Death and legacy ==
Sandford died unmarried on 2 April 1723 at the age aged 47 and the baronetcy became extinct on his death. His estates passed to his sister, the wife of Philip Honywood.

Parliament of England
Preceded by Sir John Lowther; Sir Christopher Musgrave	Member of Parliament for Westmorland; 1695–1700; With: Sir John Lowther 1695–1696; William Fleming 1696–1700	Succeeded by Sir Christopher Musgrave; William Fleming
Preceded by Philip Howard; Henry Belasyse	Member of Parliament for Morpeth; 1701; With: Henry Belasyse	Succeeded by Sir John Delaval; Emanuel Howe
Preceded by Sir Christopher Musgrave; Henry Graham	Member of Parliament for Westmorland; 1701–1702; With: Henry Graham	Succeeded by Sir Christopher Musgrave; Henry Graham
Preceded by Sir John Delaval; Emanuel Howe	Member of Parliament for Morpeth; 1705–1707; With: Edmund Maine	Succeeded by Parliament of Great Britain
Parliament of Great Britain
Preceded by Parliament of England	Member of Parliament for Morpeth; 1705–1713; With: Edmund Maine 1707–1708; Sir John Bennett 1708–1710; Christopher Wandesford 1710–1713	Succeeded by Sir John Germain; Oley Douglas
Preceded by Edward Duncombe; Thomas Lutwyche	Member of Parliament for Appleby; 1713–1723; With: Thomas Lutwyche 1713–1722; Sackville Tufton 1722–1723	Succeeded by Sackville Tufton; James Lowther
Political offices
Preceded by Craven Peyton	Warden of the Mint; 1714–1718	Succeeded by William Thompson
Baronetage of England
Preceded by Richard Sandford	Baronet (of Howgill); 1675–1723	Extinct
