= Newtown Act =

Electoral Act of the Parliament of Ireland 1747-48

- Act of Parliament
- Parliament of Ireland
- Long title: An Act to amend and make more effectual an act, entitled, an act for better regulating elections of members to serve in parliament, and for the more effectual quieting of corporations, and securing the rights of persons who have been, or shall be, elected into the offices of aldermen and burgesses within any corporations of this kingdom.
- Citation: 21 Geo. 2. c. 10 (I)
- Introduced by: Thomas Le Hunt
- Territorial extent: Ireland

Dates
- Royal assent: 9 April 1748
- Commencement: 6 October 1747 (Note: Start of session.)
- Repealed: 8 May 2007: Republic of Ireland

Other legislation
- Amended by: Statute Law Revision (Ireland) Act 1878
- Repealed by: Statute Law Revision Act 2007: Republic of Ireland
- Relates to: 19 Geo. 2. c. 11 (I)

Status: Repealed

Text of statute as originally enacted

The Newtown Act (Note: The act was passed in the parliamentary session 1747–8, and is sometimes cited as the Newtown Act 1747 or Newtown Act 1748.) (21 Geo. 2. c. 10 (I)) was an act of the Parliament of Ireland regulating municipal corporations, in particular the manner in which parliamentary boroughs elected members to the Irish House of Commons.

== Provisions ==
Clauses 1 to 7 aimed to curtail faggot voters by requiring a rentcharge property qualification for the franchise to be either over ten pounds or else held for over one year prior to the election. This restricted temporary conveyancing of parts of a freehold from its true owner to multiple fictitious owners. These provisions were an uncontentious technical amendment of an act passed in 1745 (19 Geo. 2. c. 11 (I)).

The oath required of electors under the 1745 act was amended by clause 5 of the Newtown Act to reflect the changed property restrictions. The revised oath restated unchanged the portion which prohibited Irish Roman Catholics from voting:

I am not a Papist, or married to a Papist, nor do I educate, or suffer to be educated, any of my children under the age of fourteen years in the popish religion.

Clause 8 was controversially appended to the bill at a late stage. It explicitly permitted non-residents to become burgesses (members of the corporation). Burgesses were the sole parliamentary electors in corporation boroughs, and in freeman boroughs they were also crucial since they had the power to grant or refuse freeman status. The patrons of pocket boroughs ensured the burgesses were loyal placemen. Permitting non-resident burgesses was necessary as only members of the established Church of Ireland could be burgesses, and many boroughs were rotten boroughs or otherwise underdeveloped places where few Protestants were willing to settle. This provision was stated to apply to boroughs other than those with city status. The 1835 Report of the Commissioners on Municipal Corporations in Ireland questioned whether it was applicable in the case of Armagh and Tuam, both being episcopal sees and hence "cities" in William Blackstone's definition in Commentaries on the Laws of England. In fact, non-residents had served on both corporations.

== Enactment ==
The act's common name comes from Newtownards in County Down, where the Newtownards constituency was the subject of litigation between Brabazon Ponsonby, 1st Earl of Bessborough and Alexander Stewart. In 1744 Stewart bought from Bessborough's unstable stepson Robert Colvill the manor of Newtown (later renaming its seat Mount Stewart). Bessborough had been managing the borough within the manor for Colvill, and Stewart set about replacing Bessborough's appointees on its corporation, giving him control of its two MPs. Bessborough launched a court case in 1747, arguing that Stewart's burgesses were ineligible as they were not resident in the borough. This action prompted the addition of clause 8 to the bill.

The heads of the bill were reported by the Committee of the Whole House of Commons on 17 December 1747. The heads were then sent for pre-approval, as required by Poynings' Law, to the Privy Council of Ireland in January 1748 and then the Privy Council of Great Britain in March 1748, both of which debated it strongly and made amendments. Petitions were considered from Stewart and from The Irish Society. The amended bill was returned to the Commons on 28 March and sent to the Irish House of Lords on 31 March.

== Historical opinion ==
The act's negative reputation is ascribed by A. P. W. Malcomson to James Caulfeild, 1st Earl of Charlemont, who called it "the most outrageous and unconstitutional that ever was enacted" in his 1783 memoirs, which present clause 8 as instigated by Stewart solely to win his court case. William Lynch in 1831 was also critical, stating that all ancient boroughs in Ireland were de jure potwallopers, under the common law as "enforced by the statutes of 10th Hen. VII. ch. 7, and 33rd Hen. VIII"; in this view the 1748 act was one of a series of encroachments on an ancient right.

Malcomson argues that Charlemont's account is coloured by political bias and that clause 8 was "only simplifying and making more intelligible the legal position as it already stood". Malcomson accepts the court case as the motivation for clause 8, but suggests that MPs were not acting in Stewart's particular interest but from "dread and uncertainty" of a decision's effect on their own constituency. Stewart's case was decided in his favour in 1758, without reference to the Newtown Act. Malcomson suggests the act did not apply to the case as clause 8 was not retroactive, and that the clause's only effect was between 1748 and 1758, during which time it forestalled any copycat cases being started.

The allowance of non-resident burgesses has been presented as a worsening of the Irish House of Commons' unrepresentativeness, and as intended solely to increase the hold of patrons over their boroughs. Malcomson disputes this, suggesting the patron's hold was tight in any case: "what was wrong with the burgesses ... was not that they were non-resident but that there were too few of them". Malcomson posits disadvantages of restricting the franchise to residents, including the exclusion of progressive gentry living near but outside the borough, and the difficulty of determining a prospective voter's residency in cases where a borough's boundaries were irregular or uncertain.

The act's guarantee of the franchise to non-residents resulted in a transfer of power from the local gentry and bourgeois to the larger regional landholders. The latter were interested mainly in controlling the borough's MPs, and not in its municipal affairs, causing an "ossification" in town government that lasted until the Municipal Corporations (Ireland) Act 1840.

== Amendment and repeal ==
The Roman Catholic Relief Act 1793 implicitly amended the Newtown Act, permitting Catholics to vote and specifying a different electoral oath. Clauses (sections) 1–7 of the Newtown Act were repealed by an act of 1795 (35 Geo. 3. c. 29 (I)). The Acts of Union 1800 disenfranchised most Irish boroughs, and the corporations of many of these became defunct; clause 8 of the Newtown Act continued to apply to the remainder. In 1826, Sir John Newport tried unsuccessfully to introduced a bill to repeal clause 8. The Municipal Corporations (Ireland) Act 1840 abolished most corporations and reformed the remainder. This rendered the Newtown Act obsolete. Section 8 was repealed by the Statute Law Revision (Ireland) Act 1878. The entire act (only the title and preamble remained) was not formally repealed in the Republic of Ireland until the Statute Law Revision Act 2007.

== Bibliography ==
Primary

- 1310–1612. Statutes at Large. Vol. 1. B. Grierson. 1765.
- "21 Geo. 2 c. 10 : An Act to amend and make more effectual an Act, intituled, An Act for better regulating Elections of Members to serve in Parliament, and for the more effectual quieting of Corporations, and securing the Rights of Persons, who have been or shall be elected into the Offices of Alderman and Burgesses within any Corporation of this Kingdom.". 1733–47. Statutes at Large. Vol. 6. B. Grierson. 1765.
- "Bill Number 0987". Irish Legislation Database. Queen's University Belfast.

Secondary

- Malcomson, A. P. W. (March 1973). "The Newtown Act of 1748: Revision and Reconstruction". Irish Historical Studies. 18 (71): 313–344. doi:10.1017/S0021121400025840. JSTOR 30005420. S2CID 159997457.
- Royal Commission appointed to inquire into the municipal corporations in Ireland: first report. Command papers. 1835.
- Johnston-Liik, E. M. (2006). "Electoral legislation". MPs in Dublin: Companion to History of the Irish Parliament, 1692-1800. Ulster Historical Foundation. pp. 200–202, 247. ISBN 9781903688601.
- Porritt, Edward; Porritt, Annie G. (1903). "XLV: Borough Representation from the Revolution to the Union. — The Corporation Boroughs". The Unreformed House Of Commons; Parliamentary Representation Before 1832. Vol. II: Scotland and Ireland. Cambridge University Press. pp. 295–317 : 303–306.
