= Richard Connell (Irish politician) =

Irish politician

Richard Connell (1650–1714) was an Irish Member of Parliament for St Canice 1692–1693, 1695–1699 and 1703–1713.

He was active in the politics of the corporations of St Canice and Kilkenny, having followed his father in being Registrar of the Diocese of Ossory, the Sheriff of Kilkenny city, and an alderman of the same. He was also mayor of Kilkenny twice, in 1685–1686–1687.

His father, William Connell, had himself been mayor of Kilkenny twice, in 1671–1672–1673, and had been Sheriff in 1659–1660. His mother was daughter of John Bishop of Glandonnell, and he was their eldest son.

While he was mayor, on 1685-02-05 he was awarded a grant of arms described heraldically as:

argent on a chief sable, two book registers of the first; crest: a dexter hand purpure vested sable, holding a rod argent; motto: Servus servorum Dei
