= Viscount Castlecomer =

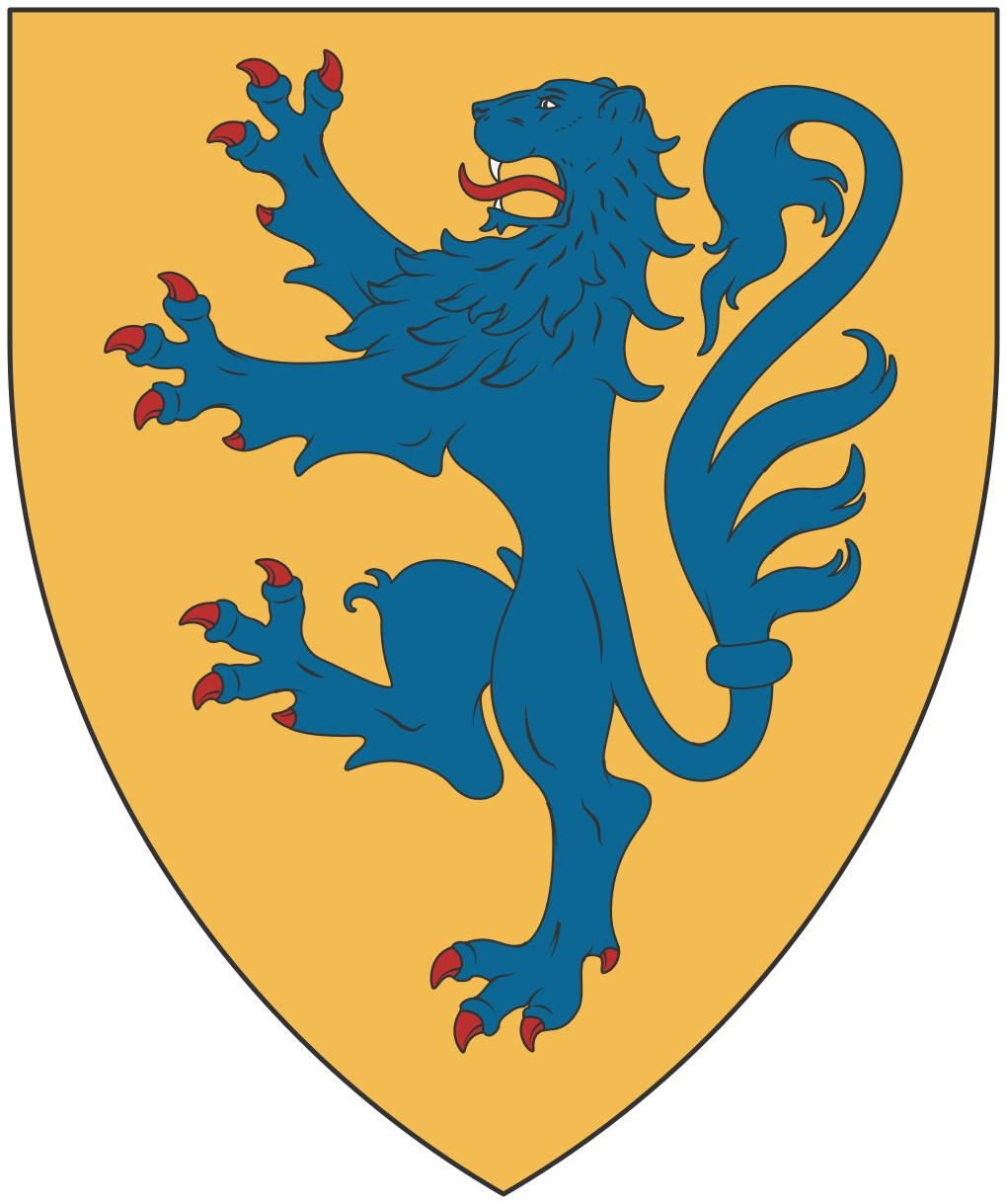
Arms of Wandesford of Kirklington, Viscounts Castlecomer, Earls Wandesford

Viscount Castlecomer was a title created on 15 March 1707, along with the title Baron Wandesford, for Christopher Wandesford, 1st Viscount Castlecomer, whose father, Sir Christopher Wandesford, had been created Baronet of Kirklington, North Yorkshire on 5 August 1662 in the Baronetage of England. The 5th Viscount was created Earl Wandesford on 15 August 1758. All three titles and the baronetcy became extinct on his death in 1784.

== Baronets of Kirklington (1662) ==
- Sir Christopher Wandesford, 1st Baronet (1628–1687)
- Sir Christopher Wandesford, 2nd Baronet (1656–1707) (created Viscount Castlecomer in 1707)

== Viscounts Castlecomer (1707) ==
- Christopher Wandesford, 1st Viscount Castlecomer (1656–1707)
- Christopher Wandesford, 2nd Viscount Castlecomer (1684–1719)
- Christopher Wandesford, 3rd Viscount Castlecomer (1717–1736)
- George Wandesford, 4th Viscount Castlecomer (1687–1751)
- John Wandesford, 5th Viscount Castlecomer (1725–1784) (created Earl Wandesford in 1758)

== Earls Wandesford (1758) ==
- John Wandesford, 1st Earl Wandesford (1725–1784)
