= Matthew Ridley =

Matthew Ridley may refer to:

- Matthew Ridley (barrister), British Member of Parliament for Newcastle-upon-Tyne, 1747–1774
- Sir Matthew White Ridley, 2nd Baronet (1745–1813)
- Sir Matthew White Ridley, 3rd Baronet (1778–1836)
- Sir Matthew White Ridley, 4th Baronet (1807–1877)
- Matthew White Ridley, 1st Viscount Ridley (1842–1904)
- Matthew White Ridley, 2nd Viscount Ridley (1874–1916)
- Matthew White Ridley, 3rd Viscount Ridley (1902–1964)
- Matthew White Ridley, 4th Viscount Ridley (1925–2012)
- Matt Ridley (Matthew White Ridley, 5th Viscount Ridley, 1958–), British science writer
