= Charles Hamond =

British politician

Charles Frederick Hamond MP
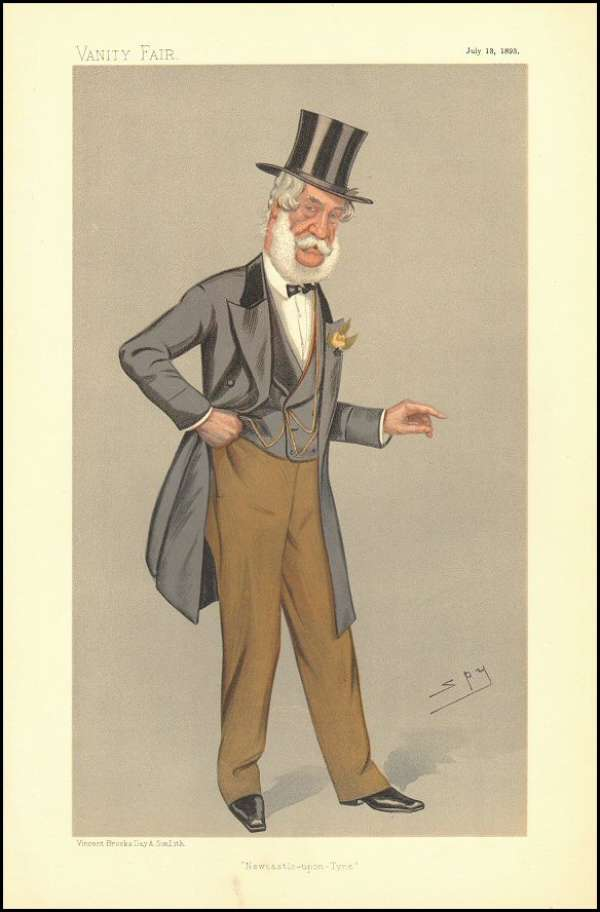
- Vanity Fair caricature of Charles Frederick Hamond

Member of Parliament for Newcastle-upon-Tyne
- In office 4 July 1892 – 1 October 1900 Serving with William Cruddas (1895–1900) (1892–1895)
- Preceded by: John Morley; James Craig
- Succeeded by: George Renwick; Walter Richard Plummer
- In office 31 January 1874 – 31 March 1880 Serving with Joseph Cowen
- Preceded by: Joseph Cowen; Thomas Emerson Headlam
- Succeeded by: Joseph Cowen; Ashton Wentworth Dilke

Personal details
- Born: 1817
- Died: 2 March 1905 (aged 87)
- Party: Conservative

Sir Charles Frederick Hamond (1817 – 2 March 1905) was a Conservative Party politician.

Hamond first stood for election at the 1874 Newcastle-upon-Tyne by-election, but was unsuccessful. However, he was then elected for the seat at the 1874 election, but was beaten again in 1880. He continued to fight for the seat, standing in 1885 and an 1886 by-election, before being elected to the seat again in 1892. He held the seat until 1900 when he did not seek re-election.

Parliament of the United Kingdom
Preceded by John Morley; James Craig	Member of Parliament for Newcastle-upon-Tyne; 1892–1900; With: William Cruddas (1895–1900); John Morley (1892–1895)	Succeeded by George Renwick; Walter Richard Plummer
Preceded by Joseph Cowen; Thomas Emerson Headlam	Member of Parliament for Newcastle-upon-Tyne; 1874–1880; With: Joseph Cowen	Succeeded by Joseph Cowen; Ashton Wentworth Dilke
