= John Hodgson-Hinde =

British politician

Member of Parliament for Newcastle-upon-Tyne
- In office 27 July 1836 – 30 July 1847 Serving with William Ord
- Preceded by: Matthew White Ridley; William Ord
- Succeeded by: Thomas Emerson Headlam; William Ord
- In office 30 July 1830 – 8 January 1835 Serving with Matthew White Ridley
- Preceded by: Charles John Brandling; Cuthbert Ellison
- Succeeded by: Matthew White Ridley; William Ord

Personal details
- Born: John Hodgson; 30 July 1806
- Died: 26 November 1869 (aged 63)
- Party: Conservative/Tory

John Hodgson-Hinde (30 July 1806 – 26 November 1869), known as John Hodgson until 11 August 1836, was a British Conservative and Tory politician.

== Family ==
Hodgson-Hinde was the son of John Hodgson and Sarah Huntley, daughter of Richard Huntley, and the brother of Richard Hodgson-Huntley (born Richard Hodgson). He was first educated privately by Reverend James Birkett at Ovingham in Northumbria between 1814 and 1819, before attending Durham School from 1819 to 1823, and then Trinity College, Cambridge in 1823. In 1833, he married Isabella Compton, daughter of Anthony Compton of Carham Hall, but they had no children. In accordance with the will of Elizabeth Archer Hinde, from August 1836, he used the additional surname of Hinde.

== Political career ==
=== Entry into parliament ===
Hodgson-Hinde made his first foray into local politics in 1828, engaging as an opponent of the proposed route of the Newcastle & Carlisle Railway, while advocating the Scotswood Bridge. In 1830, while capitalising on local dissatisfaction with the Whig Member of Parliament (MP), Matthew White Ridley, and the unwillingness of Tory Cuthbert Ellison towards a contest, he sought election as a Tory candidate for Newcastle-upon-Tyne. After an "arduous" 10 weeks of canvassing—in which he professed opposition to free trade and advocated coal and carrying trades and the gradual abolition of slavery—he was returned unopposed, on his 24th birthday, at that year's general election at the expense of Ellison. He also supported repeal of the Septennial Act 1716 and a moderate reform of parliament that "did not interfere with vested rights... without giving an indemnity to those who may suffer by the change".

While in Parliament, he was listed by the Wellington–Peel ministry as among the "good doubtfuls" but he voted against the government on the Irish Subletting Act and on the civil list, the latter of which he said he had lost confidence in them on account of their "warlike" King's Speech. He then presented petitions against slavery and for repeal of the coastwise coal duties, and became known as a "ready debater attuned to local mercantile interests". In 1830, he also ordered detailed returns on stamp duty returns from every borough "with a view to repealing that tax", but later withdrew that request when asked to by then Chancellor of the Exchequer and Leader of the House of Commons Lord Althorp. Two days later, he received a further dressing down from Home Office undersecretary of state George Lamb and anti-reformers John Wilson Croker and Charles Wetherell for presenting a similar motion on local enrolment fees.

=== Reform ===
In December 1830, he gave a well-received speech in which he supported the government as promoters of peace, retrenchment and reform, acknowledging differences with his constituents on the latter. He called for the enfranchisement of northern industrial towns, the abolition of rotten boroughs the enfranchisement of resident householders, and compensatory votes "where they lived" for non-resident freemen, but refused to sanction the ballot.

Ahead of the 1831 general election, which he anticipated, Hogdson-Hinde sought the support of individual Newcastle guilds for his "vote of conscience" for reform, and expressed support for his constituents' petition for ministerial reform, but criticised the government's failure to enfranchise South Shields within its bill. Yet, Newcastle barrister James Losh informed Lord Chancellor Brougham that Hodgson-Hinde claimed "he was one of the 20 Members who would be content to give up all opposition to what is called disfranchisement, provided persons now apprentices and the sons of freemen above 15 years of age were allowed to vote [for] life". Hodgson-Hinde was then returned unopposed at that year's election, upholding the interests of local manufacturers by speaking against the barilla duties bill and the coastwise coal duties, and then refuting charges of price-fixing by the northern coal owners. He welcomed the HM Treasury's concession on the Greenwich hospital levy in March of that year.

In that same year, he brought petitions from "free brothers" of Morpeth and Manchester criticising the government the reform bill's details, but then divided for its second reading and against adjournment. His support for the bill was, however, erratic at committee stage, and voted to retain the 1821 census as a basis for determining disfranchisement, and then cast "wayward" votes against disfranchising Appleby, Downton and St Germans. He then voted to enfranchise Greenwich and Gateshead, to unite Chatham and Strood in Rochester, and to retain Merthyr in Cardiff Boroughs.

Hodgson-Hinde, however, dissented against the anti-reformer's petition but then upheld its complaint that rate assessment provisions for tradesmen with separate shops and resources were inadequate, but then voted against proposals to extend the country franchise to freeholders in counties corporate, borough copyholders and leaseholders—but then voted in favour of enfranchising £50 tenants-at-will. He presented a petition supporting Coventry apprentices' continued enfranchisement and urged the government to preserve existing voting rights. Despite the latter, he voted in favour of disfranchising non-resident freeholders in New Shoreham, Cricklade, Aylesbury and East Retford.

He then voted in favour of the reform bill at its third reading and passage in September 1831, also supporting the Scottish reform bill and Lord Ebrington's confidence motion. Upon return to Newcastle in October, he defended his conduct as a reformer in speeches at the mayor's dinner and at a reform meeting. In the same month, he divided for the revised reform bill at its second reading and then steadily for its details for the remainder of the year—also continuing to advocate the enfranchisement of Gateshead, South Shields and Whitby into 1832. He also welcomed the enfranchisement of Merthyr at the expense of a third member for Monmouthshire, before dividing for the bill at its third reading in March 1832. He was commended by local reformers for his conduct, and then endorsed their petition for "such measures as would effectively secure" the bill's passage, also dividing for the Irish reform bill at its second reading in May 1832.

=== Other votes ===
In 1831, Hodgson-Hinde also backed various votes on reducing public salaries to 1797 levels, against the civil servant grant, and against compensating black men, Louis Celeste Lecesne and John Escoffery, after they were deported from Jamaica. He voted for the Irish union of parishes bill, and to make absentee landlords viable for Irish poor, but against the Maynooth grant. He also presented petitions against the contentious general register bill and announced he would move to exempt northern circuit counties from the bill's provisions. He refuted arguments by the bill's promoter, Edward Littleton, 1st Baron Hatherton, and said the government had "obtained office through the force of popular opinion" and should therefore not sanction the bill, noting they had little to gain but "an immense quantity of patronage"—also becoming angered the bill's opponents were not represented on a select committee created to discuss it, then being added to the committee.

He took charge of the South Shields and Monkwearmouth railway bill, in which his relations and political allies had vested interests, in opposition to County Durham MP Sir Hedworth Williamson, 7th Baronet and engineer Williamson. He defended the bill robustly, but it was defeated and he failed to have this referred to an appeal committee. He then, alongside Durham MP William Chaytor, backed the Hartlepool docks and railway bill, and presented petitions against the Sunderland (North side) docks bill, in which Williamson had a proprietorial interest. He also advocated Ridley's motion to abolish the merchant seamen's levy, and was a spokesman with him when the customs duties bill was considered in July 1832.

=== 1832–1847 ===
After a difficult canvas, during which he refused to support the ballot and his stance on corn law reform and the Bank of England's monopoly were major issues, Hodgson-Hinde was re-elected as a "self-declared Liberal", but nominally a Tory, at the 1832 general election. At the next election in 1835, he was, however, defeated, and then became vice-chairman of the North Shields Railway Company.

He returned to the seat and parliament at a by-election in 1836—caused by Ridley's death—and held the seat until 1847, when he retired from the race in favour of his brother, Richard Hodgson-Huntley.

== Later life ==
Hodgson-Hinde had moved with his mother to Stelling Hall, near Hexham, the former estate of Elizabeth Archer Hinde, having proven to have taken the additional surname of 'Hinde', also purchasing the remaining sixth of the state. He spent the next few years publishing a range of papers on antiquarian studies, including:

- Pipe Rolls for Cumberland, Durham and Westmorland (1847)
- The Foundations of British History Explored (1852)
- an introduction to History of Northumberland (1858)
- and, Simeon of Durham's Works (1868)

He also regularly contributed to the transactions of the Newcastle Society of Antiquaries, of which he was vice-president, before his death intestate and without any issue in 1869. He was buried in the family vault at Bywell St. Peter, with his widow inheriting none of his estate, having renounced probate, administration of his personal estate. The estate was instead passed to his brother, Richard.

Parliament of the United Kingdom
Preceded by Charles John Brandling; Cuthbert Ellison	Member of Parliament for Newcastle-upon-Tyne; 1830–1835; With: Matthew White Ridley	Succeeded by Matthew White Ridley; William Ord
Preceded by Matthew White Ridley; William Ord	Member of Parliament for Newcastle-upon-Tyne; 1836–1847; With: William Ord	Succeeded by Thomas Emerson Headlam; William Ord
