= John Morley =

British Liberal statesman (1838–1923)

The Right Honourable The Viscount Morley of Blackburn OM PC FRS FBA
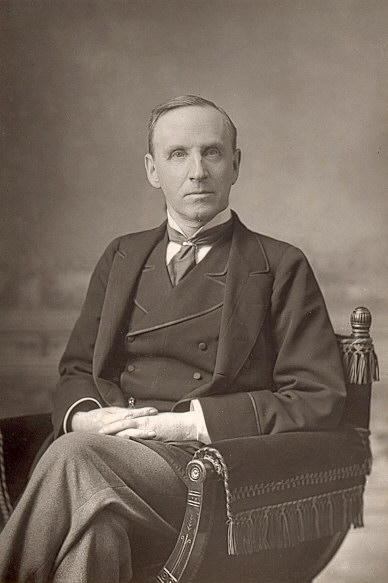
- Morley, c. 1890

Lord President of the Council
- In office 7 November 1910 – 5 August 1914
- Prime Minister: H. H. Asquith
- Preceded by: The Earl Beauchamp
- Succeeded by: The Earl Beauchamp

Secretary of State for India
- In office 7 March 1911 – 25 May 1911
- Prime Minister: H. H. Asquith
- Preceded by: The Earl of Crewe
- Succeeded by: The Earl of Crewe
- In office 10 December 1905 – 3 November 1910
- Prime Minister: Sir Henry Campbell-Bannerman; H. H. Asquith
- Preceded by: St John Brodrick
- Succeeded by: The Earl of Crewe

Chief Secretary for Ireland
- In office 22 August 1892 – 21 June 1895
- Prime Minister: William Ewart Gladstone; The Earl of Rosebery
- Preceded by: William Jackson
- Succeeded by: Gerald Balfour
- In office 6 February 1886 – 20 July 1886
- Prime Minister: William Ewart Gladstone
- Preceded by: W. H. Smith
- Succeeded by: Sir Michael Hicks Beach

Personal details
- Born: 24 December 1838 Blackburn, Lancashire, England
- Died: 23 September 1923 (aged 84) Wimbledon Park, London, England
- Party: Liberal Party
- Spouse: Rose Mary (d. 1923)
- Education: Lincoln College, Oxford

John Morley, 1st Viscount Morley of Blackburn, OM, PC, FRS, FBA (24 December 1838 – 23 September 1923), was a British Liberal statesman, writer and newspaper editor.

Initially a journalist in the North of England and then editor of the newly Liberal-leaning Pall Mall Gazette from 1880 to 1883, he was elected a Member of Parliament (MP) for the Liberal Party in 1883. He was Chief Secretary for Ireland in 1886 and between 1892 and 1895; Secretary of State for India between 1905 and 1910 and again in 1911; and Lord President of the Council between 1910 and 1914.

Morley was a distinguished political commentator, and biographer of his hero, William Ewart Gladstone. Morley is best known for his writings and for his "reputation as the last of the great nineteenth-century Liberals". He opposed imperialism and the Second Boer War. He supported Home Rule for Ireland. His opposition to British entry into the First World War as an ally of Russia led him to leave the government in August 1914.

== Background and education ==
Morley was born in Blackburn, Lancashire, the son of Jonathan Morley, a surgeon, and of Priscilla Mary (née Donkin). He was educated firstly at Queen Elizabeth’s Grammar School, Blackburn where he is regarded as the school’s most distinguished old boy. He then attended Cheltenham College. While at Oxford, he quarrelled with his father over religion, and had to leave the university early without an honours degree; his father had wanted him to become a clergyman. He wrote, in obvious allusion to this rift, On Compromise (1874).

== Journalism ==
Morley was called to the bar by Lincoln's Inn in 1873, before deciding to pursue a career in journalism. He later described his decision to abandon the law "my long enduring regret". He edited the newly Radical-Liberal Pall Mall Gazette from 1880 to 1883, with W. T. Stead as his assistant editor before going into politics.

== Political career ==
Morley first stood for Parliament at the 1869 Blackburn by-election, a rare double by-election held after an election petition led to the results of the 1868 general election in Blackburn being voided. He was unsuccessful in Blackburn, and also failed to win a seat when he contested the City of Westminster at the 1880 general election.

Morley was then elected as Liberal Member of Parliament (MP) for Newcastle upon Tyne at a by-election in February 1883.

=== Morley and Newcastle ===
Morley was a prominent Gladstonian Liberal. In Newcastle, his constituency association chairman was the effective Robert Spence Watson, a leader of the National Liberal Federation and its chairman from 1890 to 1902. Newcastle, however, was a dual member constituency and Morley's parliamentary colleague, Joseph Cowen, was a radical in perpetual conflict with the Liberal Party, who owned the Newcastle Daily Chronicle. Cowen attacked Morley from the left, and sponsored working men candidates on his retirement from the seat, showing favour to the local Tory candidate, Charles Hamond. Morley, with Watson's machine, withstood the Cowen challenge until the 1895 general election, when the tactics caused the ejection of Morley and the loss of Newcastle to the Tories.

=== Chief Secretary for Ireland, 1886, 1892–95 ===
In February 1886, he was sworn to the Privy Council and made Chief Secretary for Ireland, only to be turned out when Gladstone's government fell over Home Rule in July of the same year and Lord Salisbury became prime minister. After the severe defeat of the Gladstonian party at the 1886 general election, Morley divided his life between politics and letters until Gladstone's return to power at the 1892 general election, when he resumed as Chief Secretary for Ireland.

He had during the interval taken a leading part in parliament, but his tenure of the chief secretaryship of Ireland was hardly a success. The Irish gentry made things as difficult for him as possible, and the path of an avowed Home Ruler installed in office at Dublin Castle was beset with pitfalls. In the internecine disputes that agitated the Liberal party during Lord Rosebery's administration and afterwards, Morley sided with Sir William Harcourt and was the recipient and practically co-signatory of his letter resigning the Liberal leadership in December 1898. He lost his seat in the 1895 general election but soon found another in Scotland, when he was elected at a by-election in February 1896 for the Montrose Burghs.

=== Opposition to eight hours working day ===
From 1889 onwards, Morley resisted the pressure from labour leaders in Newcastle to support a maximum working day of eight hours enforced by law. Morley objected to this because it would interfere in natural economic processes. It would be "thrusting an Act of Parliament like a ramrod into all the delicate and complex machinery of British industry". For example, an Eight Hours Bill for miners would impose on an industry with great diversity in local and natural conditions a universal regulation. He further argued that it would be wrong to "enable the Legislature, which is ignorant of these things, which is biased in these things—to give the Legislature the power of saying how many hours a day a man shall or shall not work".

Morley told trade unionists that the only right way to limit working hours was through voluntary action from them. His outspokenness against any eight hours bill, rare among politicians, brought him the hostility of labour leaders. In September 1891, two mass meetings saw labour leaders such as John Burns, Keir Hardie and Robert Blatchford all calling for action against Morley. In the election of 1892, Morley did not face a labour candidate but the Eight Hours League and the Social Democratic Federation supported the Unionist candidate. Morley kept his seat but came second to the Unionist candidate. When Morley was appointed to the government and the necessary by-election ensued, Hardie and other socialists advised working men to vote for the Unionist candidate (who supported an Eight Hours Bill for miners), but the Irish vote in Newcastle rallied to Morley and he comfortably kept his seat.

Morley’s stance put him at odds with other members of his party who supported legislative limitations on hours of work. After a vote on an Eight Hours Bill in the Commons in March 1892, Morley wrote: "That has taken place which I apprehended. The Labour party—that is, the most headstrong and unscrupulous and shallow of those who speak for labour—has captured the Liberal party. Even worse—the Liberal party, on our bench at any rate, has surrendered sans phrase, without a word of explanation or vindication".

=== Ideological positions ===
In 1880, Morley wrote to Auberon Herbert, an extreme opponent of state intervention, that "I am afraid that I do not agree with you as to paternal government. I am no partisan of a policy of incessant meddling with individual freedom, but I do strongly believe that in so populous a society as ours now is, you may well have a certain protection thrown over classes of men and women who are unable to protect themselves". In 1885, Morley spoke out against those Liberals who believed that all state intervention was wrong and proclaimed: "I am not prepared to allow that the Liberty and the Property Defence League are the only people with a real grasp of Liberal principles, that Lord Bramwell and the Earl of Wemyss are the only Abdiels of the Liberal Party". Later that year Morley defined his politics: "I am a cautious Whig by temperament, I am a Liberal by training, and I am a thorough Radical by observation and experience".

By the mid-1890s, according to one study, Morley adopted a doctrinaire opposition to state intervention in social and economic matters. He repeatedly expressed his hope that social reform would not become a party issue and warned voters to "Beware of any State action which artificially disturbs the basis of work and wages". Politicians could not "insure steady work and good wages" because of "great economic tides and currents flowing which were beyond the control of any statesman, Government, or community". Morley also opposed the state providing benefits for sections or classes of the community as the government should not be used as a tool for sectional or class interests. The Unionist government had proposed to help farmers by assuming some of their rates and wanted to subsidise West Indian sugar producers. Morley viewed these as dangerous precedents of "distributing public money for the purposes of a single class" and he asked voters: "How far are you going to allow this to take you? ... If you are going to give grants to help profits, how are you off from giving grants in favour of aiding wages?" The end of this process, Morley warned, would see "national workshops to which anybody has a right to go and receive money out of your pockets".

Despite this, Morley nevertheless expressed sympathy towards the underprivileged and was supportive of certain reform proposals and measures including provisions for old age. In an 1892 address, Morley declared himself to be animated “as I have been all my life, by an earnest and heartfelt desire to soften the vicissitudes and ease the hardships of the host of manual toilers who do so much for the service of the world, and who, as yet, have so scanty a share of the world’s heritage.” In the early 1900s, Morley believed (as one study has noted) “that the main problems facing Britain were not imperial but social.” In a later speech he delivered to businessmen in 1910, Morley commented positively on how (as noted by one journal at the time) “One of the most remarkable and moving features of our time in England was the intense wave of sympathy and feeling for the lost or the unfortunate.”

Nevertheless, Morley deeply distrusted (according to one study) “most types of social reform.” An example of this can arguably found in his concerns over proposals for old age pensions under the Liberal government, 1905-1915:

It will be injurious to us with the lower middle-class, who after all are no inconsiderable contingent of our party strength. On the other hand, we shall hardly be able to produce proposals magnificent enough to make the workmen ardently enthusiastic, or even decently satisfied.

Morley viewed imperialism and an interventionist foreign policy as increasing the power of the state. The increase in state expenditure due to the Boer War (1899–1902) disturbed him because it might lead to the state's revenue-raising power being used to implement great changes in the social and economic structure of the country. Francis Hirst recorded in October 1899 about Morley: "He is depressed about national expenditure. He fears, when bad times come, that we shall have not retrenchment, but 'nefarious attacks on property and reversions to Fair Trade'." Imperialism and the increasing expenditure needed to fund it would lead to a reconstruction of the income tax and in turn would lead to taxing some people more heavily than others, something which was against the "maxims of public equity". Morley now regretted Gladstone's budget of 1853 (where the income tax was set "on its legs") because it gave the Chancellor of the Exchequer "a reservoir out of which he could draw with ease and certainty whatever was asked for". Gladstone had "furnished not only the means, but a direct incentive to that policy of expenditure which it was the great object of his life to check". After Joseph Chamberlain came out in favour of Tariff Reform in 1903, Morley defended Free trade. Morley claimed that it was no coincidence that since the repeal of the Corn Laws in 1846, Britain was the only great country in Western Europe not to experience "even a shadow of a civil convulsion". Protectionism was conducive to social distress, political corruption and political unrest.

Morley's great speech at Manchester, in 1899, raises him to a special level amongst masters of English rhetoric:

You may make thousands of women widows and thousands of children fatherless. It will be wrong. You may add a new province to your empire. It will still be wrong. You may increase the shares of Mr Rhodes and his Chartereds beyond the dreams of avarice. Yea, and it will still be wrong!

Morley was among the original recipients of the Order of Merit in the 1902 Coronation Honours list published on 26 June 1902, and received the order from King Edward VII at Buckingham Palace on 8 August 1902. In July 1902, he was presented by Andrew Carnegie with the late Lord Acton's valuable library, which, on 20 October, he in turn gave to the University of Cambridge.

=== Secretary of State for India ===
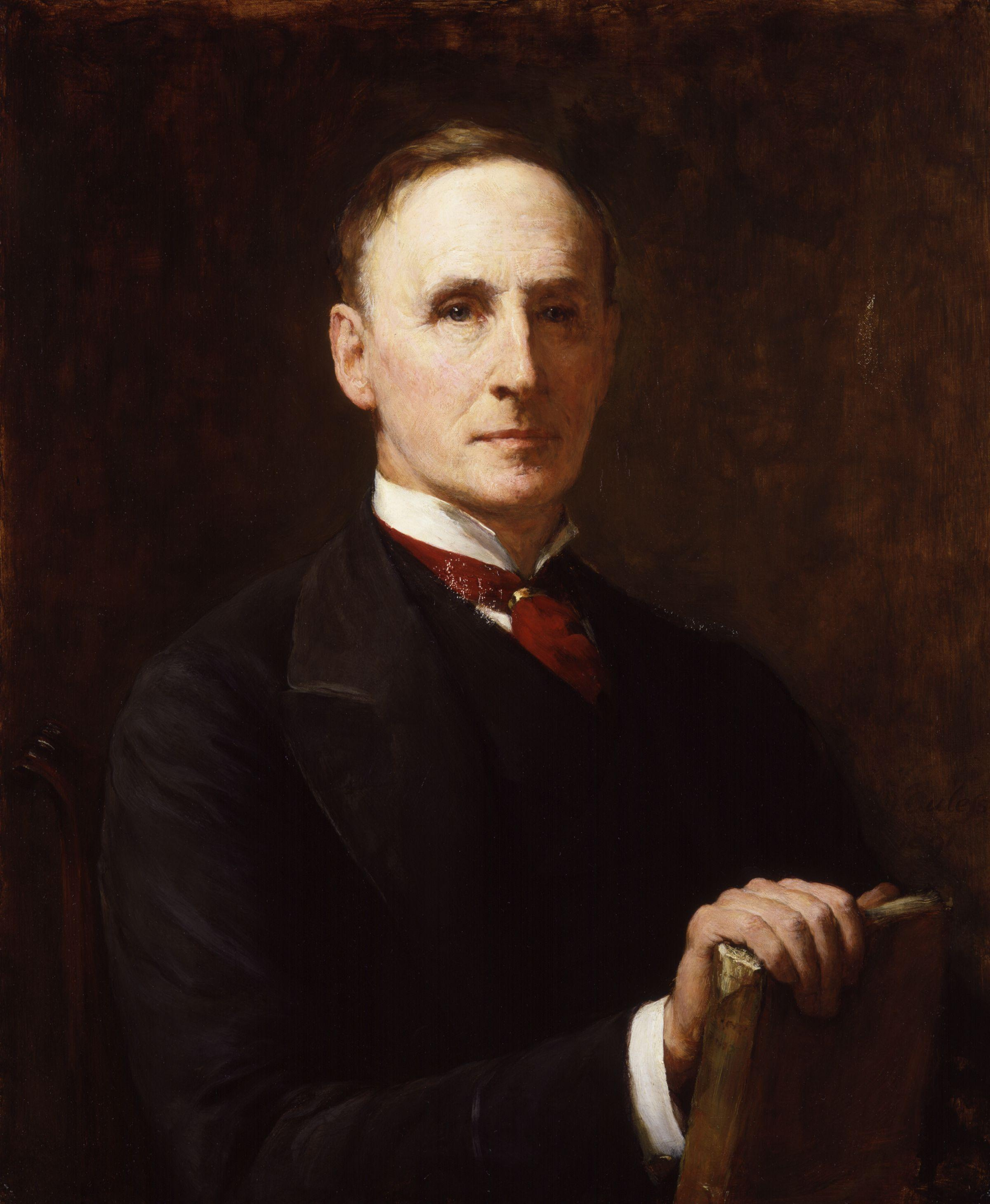
Portrait of Lord Morley of Blackburn by Walter William Ouless

When Sir Henry Campbell-Bannerman formed his cabinet at the end of 1905, Morley was made Secretary of State for India. He would have preferred to have been Chancellor of the Exchequer. In this position, he was conspicuous in May 1907 and afterwards for his firmness in sanctioning extreme measures for dealing with the outbreak in India of alarming symptoms of sedition. Though he was strongly opposed by some of the more extreme members of the Radical party, on the grounds of belying his democratic principles in dealing with the British Raj, his action was generally recognised as combining statesmanship with patience. While firmly opposing revolutionary propaganda, he showed his popular sympathies by appointing two distinguished native Indians to the Council of India and taking steps for a decentralisation of the administrative government. When Sir Henry Campbell-Bannerman resigned in 1908 and H. H. Asquith became prime minister, Morley retained his post in the new cabinet; but it was thought advisable to relieve him of the burden imposed by a seat in the House of Commons, and he was transferred to the Upper House, being created a peer with the title of Viscount Morley of Blackburn, in the County palatine of Lancaster. He was the first peer to turn down a coat of arms, although a wall panel at Lincoln's Inn incorrectly ascribes one to him.

In September 1906, Morley wrote favourably for staunch resistance to the railway workers' agitation for higher wages. Failure to do so would damage the Liberal Party with the middle class because "railways are the middle class investment... if anybody thinks we can govern this country against the middle class, he is wrong". In 1909 the Liberal Chancellor David Lloyd George increased taxes in his budget (the "People's Budget") to pay for increased armaments and social reform. Morley said that behind the budget "hangs the spectre of Tariff Reform" because the public "may say that, if this is the best that can be done under Free Trade, they'll try something else". Morley viewed "the Expenditure of the country" as "the most formidable of our standing problems".

In 1909, the UK Parliament passed the Indian Councils Act 1909, also known as the Minto–Morley Reforms. Named after Viceroy Lord Minto and Morley, the act introduced elections to legislative councils and admitted Indians to councils of the Secretary of State for India, the viceroy, and to the executive councils of Bombay Presidency and Madras Presidency. Muslims were granted separate electorates according to the demands of the All-India Muslim League. The Act was introduced to introduce communal representation in Indian politics, with the aim of countering the growing nationalism by dividing the common Indian population along communal lines. This ultimately resulted in the partition of the country along religious lines.

Morley continued to hold the seals of the India Office until November 1910, when he resigned them, as he himself revealed subsequently, "partly because I was tired, partly from a feeling that a new viceroy would have fairer openings with a new secretary of state; partly, too, that I might have a farewell chance of literary self-collection." One of his last important official acts had been to resist the appointment of Lord Kitchener to the viceroyalty, pressed strongly upon him by King Edward just before his death. Until the outbreak of World War I, Morley remained in the Ministry as Lord President of the Council, and was one of the four counsellors of state to administer the kingdom during George V's visit to India for the Delhi Durbar in the winter of 1911–1912.

=== Lord President of the Council ===
As a member of the House of Lords, Lord Morley of Blackburn helped assure the passage of the Parliament Act 1911, which eliminated the Lords' power to veto bills.

Owing to the temporary failure of Lord Crewe's health, Morley led the House of Lords during most of the session of 1911, in which the reform bill was passed; and it was he who read out to the House on the last night of debate the definite assurance from King George which finally secured the majority of 17: "His Majesty would assent to a creation of peers sufficient in number to guard against any possible combination of the different parties in opposition by which the Parliament bill might be exposed a second time to defeat."

He not only took charge of the India Office during Lord Crewe's illness, and of the Foreign Office in Sir Edward Grey's short holidays, but he was an outstanding figure in the Home Rule debates of 1913 and 1914. In moving the second reading of the Amending bill on 1 July 1914, he said that the National Volunteers had dispelled the illusion that the masses of the South and West of Ireland had lost their care for Home Rule.

In the lead-up to Great Britain's entry into World War I, on 2 August 1914 the Liberal cabinet declared its intention to defend the French coast against the German Imperial Navy. In opposition to this commitment, Morley resigned along with John Burns. Unlike other Liberals, he was not alarmed by Germany's invasion of Belgium. However, he was especially hostile to Russia and felt he could not be a part of a war alongside Russia against Germany.

== Retirement ==
In 1917, Lord Morley of Blackburn published his two volumes of memoirs, Recollections. In it, he contrasted old and new Liberalism:

The theory of new Liberalism did not seem much more piquant or fertile than the respectable old. As it happened, in the fulness of time our distinguished apostles of Efficiency came into supreme power, with a share in the finest field for efficient diplomacy and an armed struggle, that could have been imagined. Unhappily they broke down, or thought they had (1915), and could discover no better way out of their scrape than to seek deliverance (not without a trace of arbitrary proscription) from the opposing party that counted Liberalism, old or new, for dangerous and deluding moonshine.

During his retirement, Morley kept an interest in politics. He said to his friend John Morgan on 15 February 1918:

I'm sick of Wilson... He hailed the Russian Revolution six months ago as the new Golden Age, and I said to Page, 'What does he know of Russia?' to which Page replied, 'Nothing'. As for his talk about a union of hearts after the war, the world is not made like that.

This led Morgan to ask Morley about the League of Nations: "A mirage, and an old one". Morgan asked: "How are you going to enforce it?", whereupon Morley replied: "How indeed? One may as well talk of London morality being due to the Archbishop of Canterbury. But take away Scotland Yard!" When asked in 1919 about the Covenant of the League of Nations, Morley said: "I have not read it, and I don't intend to read it. It's not worth the paper it's written on. To the end of time it'll always be a case of 'Thy head or my head'. I've no faith in these schemes". When a prominent Liberal praised someone as "a good European" Morley remarked: "When I lay me down at night or rise in the morning I do not ask myself if I am a good European". Towards the close of 1919 he was worried about Britain's guarantee to France:

Surely a permanent commitment like that is contrary to all our foreign policy. What do the words 'unprovoked attack' by Germany mean? They are dangerously vague. I've been discussing them with Rosebery and he is as uneasy as I am. He wrote a letter to the Press about it, and The Times refused to publish it.

He often criticised Labour Party policies and said to Morgan: "Have you read Henderson's speech about a capital levy? It's rank piracy". During a discussion on 6 May 1919, Morley remarked: "I see Lloyd George has invited the Irish republicans to a conference. It's an act of inconceivable folly—he, the King's Prime Minister!" When the House of Lords were debating the Fourth Home Rule Bill, Morley said to Morgan on 6 January 1921:

I should have liked to have been there if only to have got up and said, 'If Mr. G's Home Rule Bill had been passed 30 years ago could Ireland have been worse than now? Would it have not been better?' And then fallen dead like Lord Chatham.

On 1 May 1921, Morley said: "If I were an Irishman I should be a Sinn Féiner". When asked by Morgan: "And a Republican?" Morley said "No".

He liked Winston Churchill and said to Morgan on 22 December 1921:

I foresee the day when Birkenhead will be Prime Minister in the Lords with Winston leading the Commons. They will make a formidable pair. Winston tells me Birkenhead has the best brain in England.... But I don't like Winston's habit of writing articles, as a Minister, on debatable questions of foreign policy in the newspapers. These allocutions of his are contrary to all Cabinet principles. Mr. G. would never have allowed it.

In a letter to Sir Francis Webster in 1923, Morley wrote:

Present party designations have become empty of all contents... Vastly extended State expenditure, vastly increased demands from the taxpayer who has to provide the money, social reform regardless of expense, cash exacted from the taxpayer already at his wits' end—when were the problems of plus and minus more desperate? How are we to measure the use and abuse of industrial organization? Powerful orators find "Liberty" the true keyword, but then I remember hearing from a learned student that of "liberty" he knew well over two hundred definitions. Can we be sure that the "haves" and the "have-nots" will agree in their selection of the right one? We can only trust to the growth of responsibility; we may look to circumstances and events to teach their lesson.

== Literature ==
Morley devoted a considerable amount of time to literature, his anti-Imperial views being practically swamped by the overwhelming predominance of Unionism and Imperialism. His position as a leading British writer had early been determined by his monographs on Voltaire (1872), Rousseau (1873), Diderot and the Encyclopaedists (1878), Burke (1879), and Walpole (1889). Burke as the champion of sound policy in America and of justice in India, Walpole as the pacific minister understanding the true interests of his country, fired his imagination. Burke was Morley's contribution to Macmillan's "English Men of Letters" series of literary biographies, of which Morley himself was general editor between 1878 and 1892; he edited a second series of these volumes from 1902 to 1919. The Life of Cobden (1881) is an able defence of that statesman's views rather than a critical biography or a real picture of the period.

The Life of Oliver Cromwell (1900) revised Samuel Rawson Gardiner as Gardiner had revised Thomas Carlyle. Morley's contributions to political journalism and to literary, ethical and philosophical criticism were numerous and valuable. They show great individuality of character, and recall the personality of John Stuart Mill, with whose mode of thought he had many affinities. After the death of Gladstone, Morley was principally engaged in his biography, until it was published in 1903. Representing as it does so competent a writer's sifting of a mass of material, the Life of Gladstone was a masterly account of the career of the great Liberal statesman; traces of Liberal bias were inevitable but are rarely manifest; and in spite of the a priori unlikelihood of a full appreciation of Gladstone's powerful religious interests from such a quarter (Morley was an agnostic), the whole treatment is characterized by sympathy and judgement. The work was very successful, selling more than 25,000 copies in its first year.

Morley was a Trustee of the British Museum from 1894 to 1921, Honorary Professor of Ancient Literature at the Royal Academy of Arts, and member of the Royal Commission on Historical Manuscripts. He was Chancellor of the Victoria University of Manchester from 1908 until 1923, when he resigned. He was nominated for a Nobel Prize in Literature eleven times. He received an honorary degree (LL.D.) from the University of St Andrews in October 1902.

== Legacy ==
A philosophical Radical of a somewhat mid-19th century type, and highly suspicious of the later opportunistic reaction (in all its forms) against Cobdenite principles, he yet retained the respect of the majority whom it was his usual fate to find against him in British politics by the indomitable consistency of his principles and by sheer force of character and honesty of conviction and utterance. His legacy was a purely moral one; although in May 1870 he married Mrs. Rose Mary Ayling, the union produced no heirs. Mrs. Ayling was already married when she met John Morley and the couple waited to marry until her first husband died several years later (another similarity to John Stuart Mill). She was never received into polite society, and many of his colleagues, including Asquith, never met her. Morley had three siblings, Edward Sword Morley (1828–1901), William Wheelhouse Morley (1840 – c. 1870), and Grace Hannah Morley (1842–1925).

According to historian Stanley Wolpert in his 1967 book: "It is hardly exaggeration to speculate that, but for the socially unpardonable circumstances surrounding his marriage, Morley might well have become Britain's foreign secretary, possibly even prime minister". After more than 50 years of a quietly secluded personal life, Viscount Morley of Blackburn died of heart failure at his home, Flowermead, Wimbledon Park, south London, on 23 September 1923, aged eighty-four, when the viscountcy became extinct. After cremation at Golders Green Crematorium, his ashes were buried at Putney Vale Cemetery. He was followed in death several months later by Rose. Morley's estate was valued for probate at £59,765, a surprising sum for a self-made man who devoted his life to writing and politics.

Morley inspired many leading figures of the 20th century, including Mahomed Ali Jinnah, the founding father of Pakistan. The Austrian-born classical liberal theorist Friedrich Hayek, writing in 1944, as a British citizen, wrote about Morley's reputation:

It is scarcely an exaggeration to say that the more typically English a writer on political or social problems then appeared to the world, the more he is to-day forgotten in his own country. Men like Lord Morley or Henry Sidgwick, Lord Acton or A. V. Dicey, who were then admired in the world at large as outstanding examples of the political wisdom of liberal England, are to the present generation largely obsolete Victorians.

== Publications ==
- Edmund Burke: A Historical Study. London: Macmillan. 1867 – via Internet Archive.
- Critical Miscellanies (1871. Second volume; 1877).
- Voltaire (1871).
- Rousseau (1873).
- The Struggle for National Education (London: Chapman & Hall, 1873).
- On Compromise (1874; Chapman & Hall, 2nd edition, revised, 1877).
- Diderot and the Encyclopaedists (London: Chapman & Hall, 1878).
- Burke. London: Macmillan. 1879 – via Internet Archive.(English Men of Letters series).
- The Life of Richard Cobden. Vol. 1. London: Macmillan. 1881.; volume 2
- Aphorisms: An Address Delivered before the Edinburgh Philosophical Institution, November 11, 1887 (London: Macmillan, 1887). Wikisource: Full text.
- Walpole (London: Macmillan, 1889) (Twelve English Statesmen series).
- Studies in Literature (London: Macmillan, 1891).
- Oliver Cromwell (New York: The Century Co., 1900).
- The Life of William Ewart Gladstone. London & New York: Macmillan and Co. Limited and The Macmillan Company. 1903 – via Internet Archive. volume I; volume II, volume III
- Notes on Politics and History: A University Address. London: Macmillan & Co. 1913–14.
- Recollections (New York: The Macmillan Company, 1917. 2 vols.). Vol. 1•Vol. 2
- Memorandum On Resignation August 1914 Macmillan And Co., Limited, St. Martin's Street, London 1928

== Notes ==
Bibliography

- Hamer, D. A. John Morley: Liberal Intellectual in Politics (Oxford University Press, 1968).
- Hamer, David. "Morley, John, Viscount Morley of Blackburn (1838–1923)", Oxford Dictionary of National Biography (Oxford University Press, 2004); online edn, Jan 2008 accessed 13 Sept 2014 : doi:10.1093/ref:odnb/35110
- Moore, R. J. "John Morley's Acid Test: India 1906–1910", Pacific Affairs, (Dec 1968) 41#1 pp. 333–340, in JSTOR
- Waitt, E. I. John Morley, Joseph Cowen and Robert Spence Watson. Liberal Divisions in Newcastle Politics, 1873–1895. Thesis submitted for the degree of PhD at the University of Manchester, October 1972. Copies in Manchester University, Newcastle Central, and Gateshead libraries.
- Wolpert, S. A. Morley and India, 1906–1910 (University of California Press, 1967)

Parliament of the United Kingdom
Preceded by Ashton Wentworth Dilke; Joseph Cowen	Member of Parliament for Newcastle-upon-Tyne; 1883–1895; With: Joseph Cowen 1885–1886; James Craig 1886–1892; Sir Charles Frederic Hamond 1892–1895	Succeeded by William Donaldson Cruddas; Sir Charles Frederic Hamond
Preceded by John Shiress Will	Member of Parliament for Montrose Burghs; 1896–1908	Succeeded by Robert Venables Vernon Harcourt
Media offices
Preceded by George Henry Lewes	Editor of The Fortnightly Review; 1867–1882	Succeeded by Thomas Hay Sweet Escott
Preceded by Justin McCarthy	Editor of the Morning Star; 1869	Succeeded by Publication closed
Preceded by Frederick Greenwood	Editor of The Pall Mall Gazette; 1880–1883	Succeeded by William Thomas Stead
Political offices
Preceded by W. H. Smith	Chief Secretary for Ireland; 1886	Succeeded by Sir Michael Hicks Beach, Bt
Preceded by William Jackson	Chief Secretary for Ireland; 1892–1895	Succeeded by Gerald William Balfour
Preceded by St John Brodrick	Secretary of State for India; 1905–1910	Succeeded by Robert Crewe-Milnes, 1st Earl of Crewe
Preceded by William Lygon, 7th Earl Beauchamp	Lord President of the Council; 1910–1914	Succeeded by William Lygon, 7th Earl Beauchamp
Preceded by Robert Crewe-Milnes, 1st Earl of Crewe	Secretary of State for India; 1911	Succeeded by Robert Crewe-Milnes, 1st Earl of Crewe
Peerage of the United Kingdom
New creation	Viscount Morley of Blackburn; 1908–1923	Extinct
