= Laurence Acton =

Laurence Acton may refer to:

- Laurence Acton (senior) (died 1386/7), English MP
- Laurence Acton (junior) (died 1410), English MP
