= Sir Matthew White Ridley, 2nd Baronet =

British politician (1745–1813)

Sir Matthew White Ridley 2nd Baronet
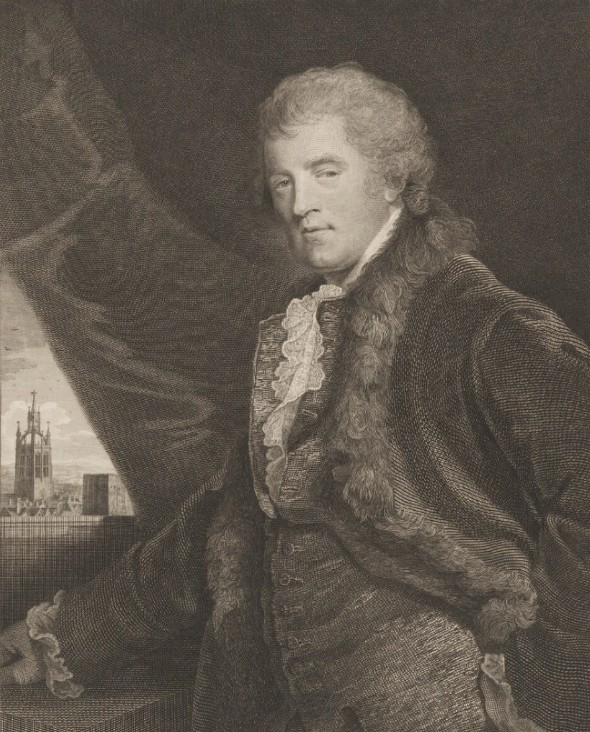
- Engraving of Ridley by James Fittler after John Hoppner, 1788

Member of Parliament for Morpeth
- In office 1768–1774 Serving with Peter Beckford
- Preceded by: Viscount Garlies; Thomas Duncombe
- Succeeded by: Francis Eyre; Peter Delmé

Member of Parliament for Newcastle-upon-Tyne
- In office 1774–1800 Serving with Sir Walter Blackett, Bt; Sir John Trevelyan, Bt (1777-1780); Andrew Robinson Bowes (1780-1784); Charles Brandling (1784-1798); Charles John Brandling (from 1798)
- Preceded by: Matthew Ridley; Sir Walter Blackett, Bt
- Succeeded by: Parliament dissolved

Member of Parliament for Newcastle-upon-Tyne
- In office 1801–1812 Serving with Charles John Brandling
- Preceded by: New Parliament
- Succeeded by: Cuthbert Ellison; Matthew White Ridley

Personal details
- Born: 28 October 1745 Heaton, Northumberland, England
- Died: 9 April 1813 (aged 67) Northumberland, England
- Spouse: Sarah Colborne (m. 1777)
- Children: 6
- Parents: Matthew Ridley (father); Elizabeth White (mother)
- Relatives: Matthew White Ridley (son); Nicholas Ridley-Colborne (son); John Scott (grandson); Matthew White Ridley (grandson); William Henry Ridley (grandson); Matthew White Ridley (great grandson)

Sir Matthew White Ridley, 2nd Baronet (28 October 1745 – 9 April 1813), was a Northumbrian landowner and politician who sat in the House of Commons between 1768 and 1812.

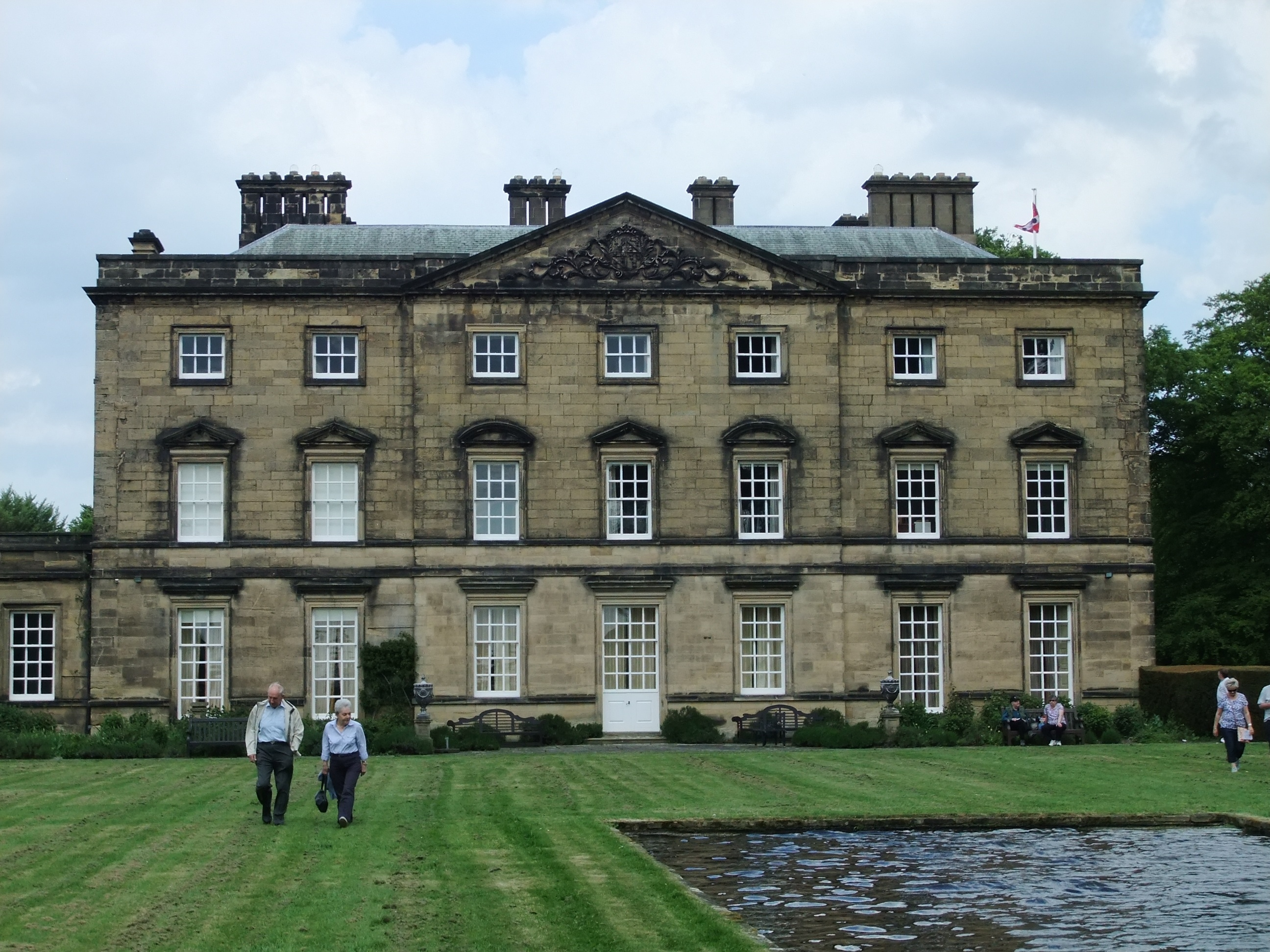
Blagdon Hall, Northumberland

== Life ==
He was the son of Matthew Ridley (1716–1778), Governor of the Newcastle-upon-Tyne Company of Merchant Adventurers, four times Mayor of and five times Member of Parliament for Newcastle, and Elizabeth White (1721–1764), daughter of Matthew White, a prominent Newcastle merchant of Blagdon Hall, Stannington, Northumberland, and sister of Sir Matthew White, 1st Baronet, of Blagdon. He succeeded to the baronetcy of Blagdon and to the estate at Blagdon Hall on the death of his uncle in 1763.

He followed his father as Governor of the Company of Merchant Adventurers.

He was appointed Chief Magistrate for Newcastle on three occasions, and was elected Mayor of the city three times, in 1774, 1782 and 1791. He served as Member of Parliament (MP) for Morpeth 1768–1774 and Newcastle 1774–1812.

A monument to his memory stands in the nave of St Nicholas' Cathedral, Newcastle. Ridley is depicted in full length life size dressed in a Roman toga. The inscription gives details of his service to the community.

== Family ==
Ridley married Sarah Colborne, daughter of Benjamin Colborne of Bath, in 1777; they had five sons and one daughter:

- Sir Matthew White Ridley, 3rd Baronet (18 April 1778 – 14 July 1836)
- Nicholas Ridley-Colborne, 1st Baron Colborne (14 April 1779 – 3 May 1854)
- Rev. Henry Colborne (14 May 1780 – 3 February 1832) married Mary Farrer, daughter of James William Farrer. They had three sons, and a daughter.
- Henrietta Elizabeth (1781 – 10 October 1853) married twice. Firstly to the Hon. John Scott, son of John Scott, 1st Earl of Eldon, on 22 August 1804. After his death she married secondly her brother's in-law, James William Farrer, son of James Farrer, on 6 July 1811. She had one son with Scott, and three sons and a daughter with Farrer.
- Rev. Richard (28 July 1782 – 21 January 1845) married Catherine Lucy Johnson, daughter of Rev. Richard Popplewell Johnson, on 8 November 1810. They had no known issue.
- Rev. Charles John (b. 5 September 1792)

His third son, Henry, and grandson William Henry Ridley, were both Rectors of Hambleden, Bucks.

His great grandson, the 5th Baronet, was created Viscount Ridley in 1900.

Parliament of Great Britain
Preceded by Viscount Garlies; Thomas Duncombe	Member of Parliament for Morpeth; 1768–1774; With: Peter Beckford	Succeeded by Francis Eyre; Peter Delmé
Preceded by Matthew Ridley; Sir Walter Blackett, Bt	Member of Parliament for Newcastle-upon-Tyne; 1774–1800; With: Sir Walter Blackett, Bt, until 1777; Sir John Trevelyan, Bt, 1777–1780; Andrew Robinson Bowes 1780–1784; Charles Brandling 1784–1798; Charles John Brandling from 1798	Parliament dissolved
Parliament of the United Kingdom
New parliament	Member of Parliament for Newcastle-upon-Tyne; 1801–1812; With: Charles John Brandling	Succeeded by Cuthbert Ellison; Matthew White Ridley
Baronetage of Great Britain
Preceded by Matthew White	Baronet of Blagdon; 1763–1813	Succeeded by Matthew White Ridley
