= William Ridley =

William Ridley may refer to:

- William Ridley (engraver) (1764–1838), British engraver
- William Ridley (bishop) (1836–1911), Anglican bishop in Canada
- William Ridley (Presbyterian missionary) (1819–1878), Presbyterian missionary and linguist in Australia
- William Henry Ridley (1816–1882), Church of England priest and author
