= Richard Beverley =

English politician

Richard Beverley (fl. 1402–1407) was an English politician. He sat as MP for Newcastle-upon-Tyne in 1402.

He also served as commissioner of inquiry in Newcastle-upon-Tyne in December 1402 concerning concealments.
