= George Ridley (Whig politician) =

British politician

Member of Parliament for Newcastle-upon-Tyne
- In office 5 February 1856 – 7 December 1860 Serving with Thomas Emerson Headlam
- Preceded by: Thomas Emerson Headlam; John Blackett
- Succeeded by: Thomas Emerson Headlam; Somerset Beaumont

Personal details
- Born: 1818
- Died: 4 November 1887 (aged 69)
- Party: Liberal
- Other political affiliations: Whig
- Parent(s): Matthew Ridley; Laura Hawkins

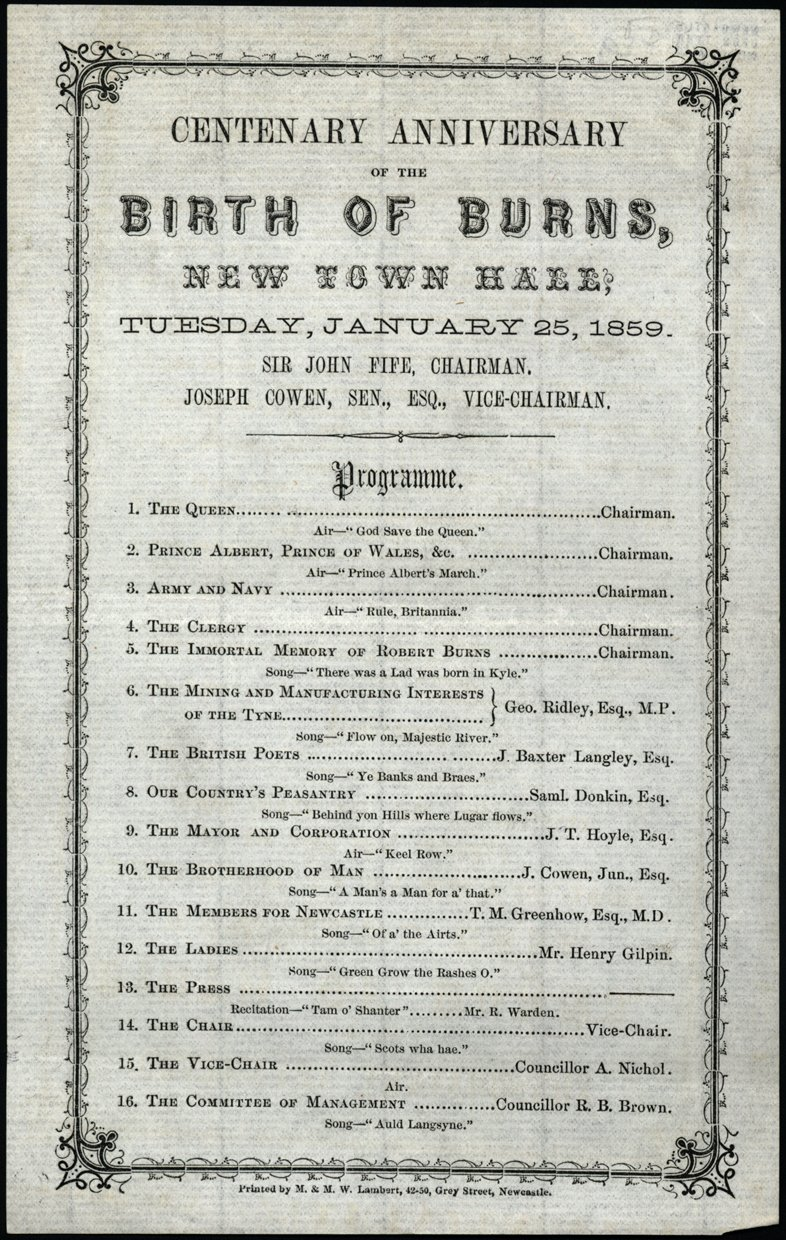
Programme for an 1859 'Birth of Burns' event, held at Newcastle-upon-Tyne, England, at which Ridley is listed as proposing a toast to "The Mining and Manufacturing Interests of the Tyne" (transcription)

George Ridley (1818 – 4 November 1887) was a British Liberal and Whig politician.

The son of former Newcastle-upon-Tyne Whig MP Matthew Ridley and Laura née Hawkins, Ridley followed his father into politics, also as a Whig MP. After unsuccessfully contesting South Northumberland in 1852, he was elected for his father's former seat at a by-election in 1856—caused by the resignation of John Blackett due to ill health—and, becoming a Liberal in 1859, held the seat until 1860, when he resigned after being appointed a Copyhold, Inclosure and Tithe Commissioner.

Parliament of the United Kingdom
Preceded by Thomas Emerson Headlam; John Blackett	Member of Parliament for Newcastle-upon-Tyne; 1856–1860; With: Thomas Emerson Headlam	Succeeded by Thomas Emerson Headlam; Somerset Beaumont
