= Robert Swinburne (born c. 1376) =

15th-century English politician

Robert Swinburne (c. 1376 – after 1426), of Newcastle upon Tyne, Northumberland, was an English merchant. He was a Member of Parliament for Newcastle-upon-Tyne in April 1414 and 1426.
