= John Blackett (politician) =

British politician

Member of Parliament for Newcastle-upon-Tyne
- In office 1852–1856 Serving with Thomas Emerson Headlam
- Preceded by: William Ord; Thomas Emerson Headlam
- Succeeded by: George Ridley; Thomas Emerson Headlam

Personal details
- Born: 21 March 1821 Marylebone, London, England
- Died: 25 April 1856 (aged 35) Villeneuve-sur-Yonne, France
- Parent: Christopher Blackett (father)

John Fenwick Burgoyne Blackett (21 March 1821 – 25 April 1856) was a British politician.

== Early life and education ==
Blackett was born at Manchester Square, Marylebone, the oldest son of Christopher Blackett, a member of parliament (MP) for Northumberland South.

John was educated at Harrow School, and in 1841 was admitted to Christ Church, Oxford (where he was president of the Oxford Union), earning a second-class degree in classics, and was elected to a fellowship at Merton College, Oxford, in 1842.

== Career ==
Blackett shortly after came to London, and studied for the bar, as well as contributing to the Edinburgh Review.

He was elected as a Member of Parliament for Newcastle-upon-Tyne at the 1852 general election. He was noted for his regular and punctual attendance to Parliament, but constant hard work wore him out and he retired in 1856, resigning his seat by appointment as Steward of the Manor of Northstead.

== Personal life ==
Blackett then moved to continental Europe to try to regain some energy, dying at Villeneuve-sur-Yonne, France.

== Sources ==
- Leigh Rayment's Historical List of MPs

Parliament of the United Kingdom
Preceded by William Ord and Thomas Emerson Headlam	Member of Parliament for Newcastle-upon-Tyne; 1852–1856; With: Thomas Emerson Headlam	Succeeded by George Ridley and Thomas Emerson Headlam
