= Sir Matthew White Ridley, 3rd Baronet =

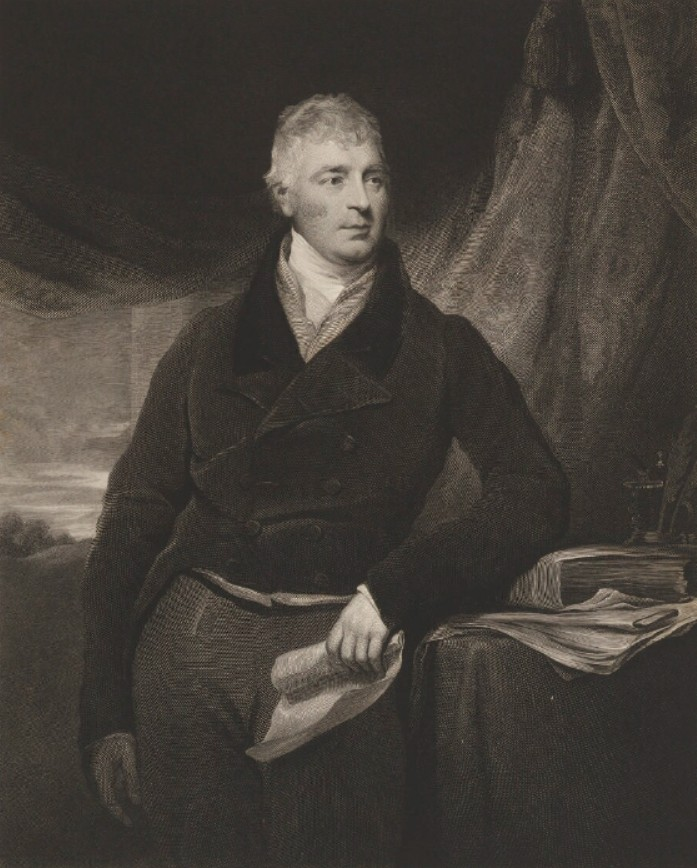
Engraving of Ridley by George Thomas Doo after a painting done by John Jackson, 1830

Sir Matthew White Ridley, 3rd Baronet (18 April 1778 – 14 July 1836) was a politician in the United Kingdom. He was Member of Parliament (MP) for Newcastle upon Tyne from 1813 until his death in 1836.

He inherited the baronetcy on the death in 1813 of his father Matthew, and was in turn succeeded by his eldest son Matthew. His younger son, George, also sat in Parliament for Newcastle (1856–1860). His daughter Janetta Maria Ridley married Isaac Cookson and emigrated with him to New Zealand where her husband became a Member of Parliament.

== Bibliography ==
- "Ridley, Sir Matthew White, 3rd bt. (1778–1836), of Blagdon, Northumb. and 1 Grafton Street, Mdx., History of Parliament Online".
- ThePeerage.com
- Leigh Rayment's list of baronets

Parliament of the United Kingdom
Preceded by Charles John Brandling; Sir Matthew White Ridley, Bt	Member of Parliament for Newcastle upon Tyne; 1813–1836; With: Cuthbert Ellison 1813–1830; John Hodgson-Hinde 1830–1835; William Ord 1835–1836	Succeeded by John Hodgson-Hinde; William Ord
Baronetage of Great Britain
Preceded by Matthew White Ridley	Baronet (of Blagdon); 1813–1836	Succeeded by Matthew White Ridley
