= John Morton (MP for Newcastle-upon-Tyne) =

English politician

John Morton was an English politician and merchant who sat as MP for Newcastle-upon-Tyne in 1393 and 1395.

== Biography ==
John Morton was appointed collector of pontage in Newcastle-upon-Tyne in May 1379. From 1380, he was a leading exporter of wool, hides and cloth. In February 1390, he received a royal licence to ship seven lasts of hides to Sandwich, Great Yarmouth. In 1395, one of his ships was wrongly detained at Great Yarmouth. Morton took the case to the court of Chancery, and the customs officer, Roger Drayton, was eventually forced to pay 20 marks in compensation, though the dispute lasted at least two more years.

Morton’s last major commercial venture was unsuccessful. In June 1408, he and other Newcastle merchants were allowed to export 600 sarplers of wool to friendly foreign ports. This wool had originally been bought in 1400 by local merchants who hoped to avoid the Calais Staple and get better prices. However, the Staplers pressured the government, and the wool remained unsold and rotted on the quays. Morton and his partners feared further problems and claimed the 1408 licence was unclear, so they did not ship the wool. New letters were issued in November 1408, but Morton was not named in them and may have withdrawn from the plan.
