= 1874 Newcastle-upon-Tyne by-election =

UK Parliamentary by-election

The 1874 Newcastle-upon-Tyne by-election was fought on 14 January 1874. The by-election was fought due to the death of the incumbent MP of the Liberal Party, Joseph Cowen. It was won by his son, the Liberal candidate Joseph Cowen.
