= Thomas Emerson Headlam =

English barrister and politician

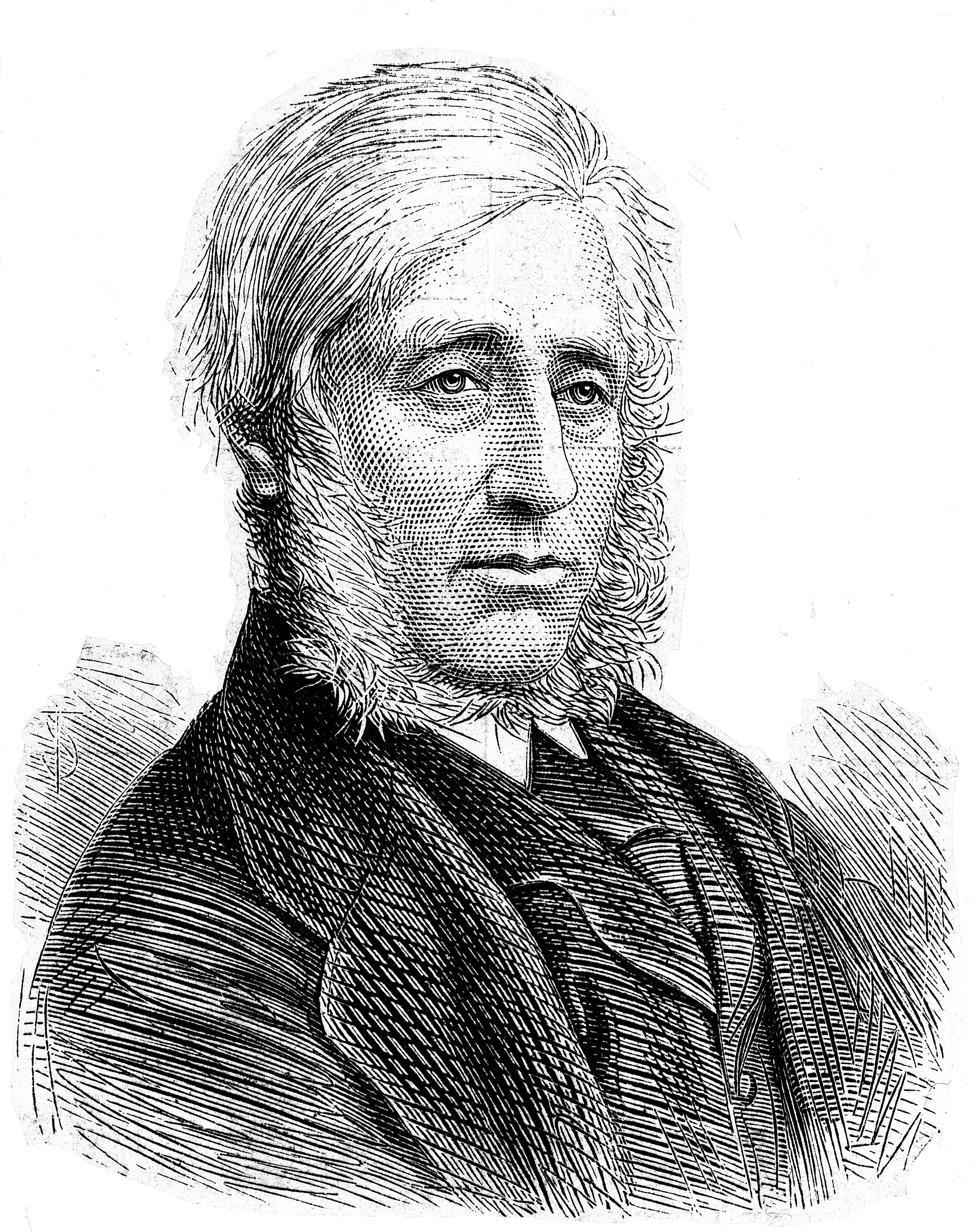
Thomas Emerson Headlam

Thomas Emerson Headlam (25 June 1813 – 3 December 1875) was an English barrister and politician, who became judge advocate-general.

== Life ==
He was the eldest son of John Headlam, Archdeacon of Richmond and rector of Wycliffe, Yorkshire, and his wife Maria Morley, daughter of the Rev. Thomas W. Morley of Clapham, born at Wycliffe rectory, and baptised on 25 June 1813. He was educated at Shrewsbury and Trinity College, Cambridge, where he became sixteenth wrangler and B.A. 1836, and M.A. 1839.

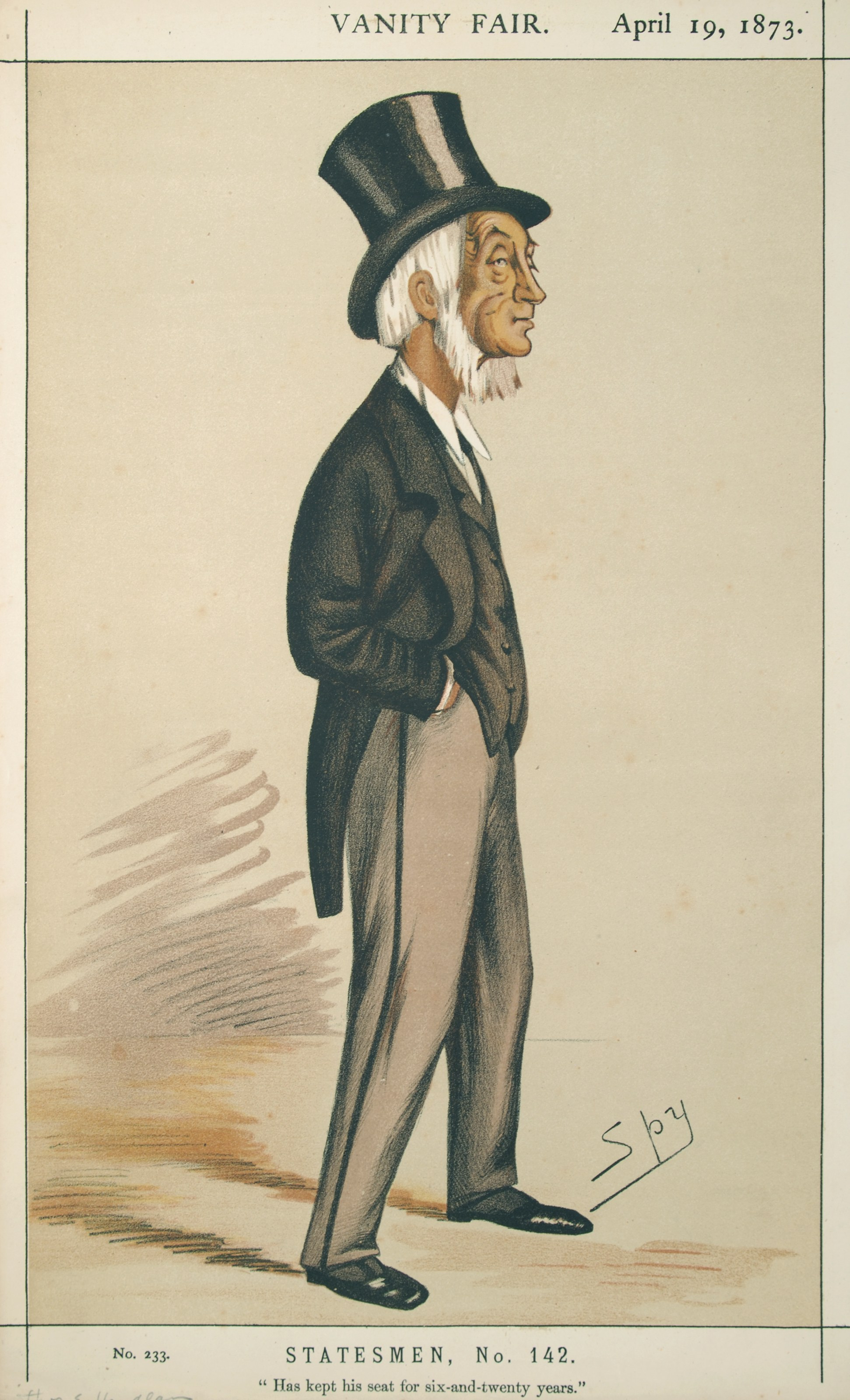
"Has kept his seat for six-and-twenty years" Headlam as caricatured by Spy (Leslie Ward) in Vanity Fair, April 1873

Headlam was called to the bar at the Inner Temple on 3 May 1839, and practised as an equity draughtsman and conveyancer, going the northern circuit and attending the North Riding sessions. After a contest he was elected a Member of Parliament in the Liberal interest for Newcastle-upon-Tyne on 30 July 1847, and sat for that town until the dissolution in 1874. During his political career he carried through the House of Commons the Trustee Act, 5 August 1850. In 1851 he was appointed a Q.C., in the same year a bencher of his inn, in 1866 reader, and in 1867 treasurer. He was a magistrate and deputy-lieutenant for the North Riding of Yorkshire and for Northumberland, and in 1854 became chancellor of the dioceses of Ripon and of Durham. He was judge advocate-general from June 1859 till July 1866, and on 18 June in the former year was gazetted a privy councillor.

After his retirement from parliamentary life, Headlam's health gradually failed, and on his way to winter in a southerly climate, he died at Calais on 3 December 1875.

== Works ==
Headlam was the author or editor of:

- The Practice of the High Court of Chancery, by E. R. Daniell, 2nd edition with additions, 1845; 3rd edition, 1857.
- A Speech on Limited Liability in Joint-Stock Banks, 1849.
- The Trustee Act, 13 and 14 Vict. c. 60, 1850; 2nd edition, 1852; 3rd edition, 1855.
- Pleadings and Practice of the High Court of Chancery, by E. R. Daniell, 2nd edition, 1851.
- A Supplement to Daniell's Chancery Practice, 1851.
- The New Chancery Acts, 15 and 16 Vict. c. 80, 86, and 87, 1853.

== Family ==
Headlam married at Richmond, Yorkshire, on 1 August 1854, Ellen Percival, eldest daughter of Thomas Van Straubenzee, major in the Royal Artillery.

Parliament of the United Kingdom
Preceded by John Hodgson Hinde; William Ord	Member of Parliament for Newcastle-upon-Tyne; 1847–1874; With: William Ord 1847–1852; John Blackett 1852–1856; George Ridley 1856–1860; Somerset Beaumont 1860–1865; Sir Joseph Cowen 1865–1874; Joseph Cowen 1874	Succeeded by Charles Frederic Hamond; Joseph Cowen
