= Ashton Wentworth Dilke =

English politician (1850–1883)

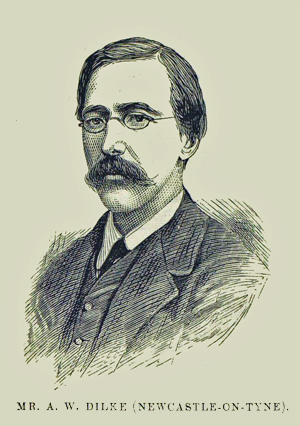
- Image published on page 421 of "The Illustrated London News", 1 May 1880.
- Born: 11 August 1850 London, England
- Died: 12 March 1883 (aged 32) Algiers, French Algeria
- Occupation: Politician
- Language: English
- Education: Trinity Hall, Cambridge
- Spouse: Margaret Eustace Smith (m. 1876)
- Children: 3
- Parents: Sir Charles Dilke, 1st Baronet και Mary Chatfield
- Relatives: Sir Charles Dilke, 2nd Baronet (brother); Charles Wentworth Dilke (grandfather)

Ashton Wentworth Dilke (11 August 1850 – 12 March 1883) was an editor, British traveller and radical Liberal politician who sat in the House of Commons from 1880 to 1883.

== Life ==
Dilke was the younger son of Sir Charles Dilke, 1st Baronet, and was educated privately before being admitted to Trinity Hall, Cambridge in 1868. He was made a scholar in 1870 and was a prominent member of the Cambridge Union Society, although he left before finishing his degree, instead travelling to Russia in 1872. For several months he lived in a Russian village and studied the language, as well as examining the status of the Russian peasantry. He returned in 1873 showing signs of tuberculosis, the disease which eventually killed him. He began writing a book about Russia, two chapters of which appeared in the Fortnightly Review in 1874, but it was never published.

In 1875, he bought the Weekly Dispatch for £14,000, acting as editor until 1876 and then again between 1878 and 1880. In 1878 he published a translation of Ivan Turgenev's Virgin Soil.

On 10 April 1876 he married Margaret Smith, eldest daughter of Thomas Eustace Smith, with whom he had two sons and a daughter. In 1880 he was elected as a member of parliament for Newcastle-upon-Tyne, but his ill-health led him to resign in February 1883, spending the last few months of his life in Algiers, where he died in March aged 32 years. His wife went on to be a leading suffragist and she was a witness called during Ashton's brother's divorce.

Media offices
Preceded by Thomas James Serle	Editor of the Weekly Dispatch; 1875–1876	Succeeded by Fox Bourne
Parliament of the United Kingdom
Preceded by Charles Frederic Hamond and Joseph Cowen	Member of Parliament for Newcastle-upon-Tyne; 1880–1883; With: Joseph Cowen	Succeeded by John Morley and Joseph Cowen
