= John Watson (16th-century MP) =

English politician

Member of Parliament for Berwick-upon-Tweed
- Incumbent
- Assumed office 1547
- Constituency: Berwick-upon-Tweed

Member of Parliament for Morpeth
- Incumbent
- Assumed office October 1553
- Constituency: Morpeth

Member of Parliament for Newcastle-upon-Tyne
- Incumbent
- Assumed office November 1554
- Constituency: Newcastle-upon-Tyne

Personal details
- Born: Newcastle-upon-Tyne, England
- Education: Lincoln's Inn, London
- Occupation: Politician

John Watson (fl. 1547–1554), from Newcastle-upon-Tyne, was an English politician.

== Family ==
Watson was the son of John Watson of Newcastle-upon-Tyne. There is no record of a marriage or children; however, his life is obscure, and it is possible that it was not the same John Watson who served for Newcastle-upon-Tyne, Morpeth and Berwick-upon-Tweed.

== Education ==
Watson was educated at Lincoln's Inn, London.

== Career ==
He was a Member (MP) of the Parliament of England for Berwick-upon-Tweed in 1547, Morpeth in October 1553, and Newcastle-upon-Tyne in November 1554.
