= Somerset Beaumont =

British Liberal politician

Somerset Archibald Beaumont DL, FRGS (6 February 1835 – 8 December 1921) was a British Liberal politician.

Beaumont was the third son of the politician Thomas Wentworth Beaumont and his wife Henrietta Jane Emma Hawks Atkinson, daughter of John Atkinson. His younger brother was Wentworth Beaumont, 1st Baron Allendale. Beaumont was educated at Harrow School and then at Trinity College, Cambridge. He stood successfully in a by-election for Newcastle-upon-Tyne in 1860, a seat he held until 1865. In the general election of 1868 Beaumont was returned to the House of Commons again and sat as Member of Parliament (MP) for Wakefield until 1874. He was one of the founders of the Anglo-Austrian Bank.

Beaumont was a Fellow of the Royal Geographical Society and a Deputy Lieutenant of Northumberland. He died in 1921 aged 86, unmarried and childless.

Parliament of the United Kingdom
Preceded by Thomas Emerson Headlam; George Ridley	Member of Parliament for Newcastle-upon-Tyne; 1860 – 1865; With: Thomas Emerson Headlam	Succeeded by Thomas Emerson Headlam; Joseph Cowen
Preceded by William Henry Leatham	Member of Parliament for Wakefield; 1868 – 1874	Succeeded by Edward Green
