= Joseph Cowen (1800–1873) =

British businessman and MP

Sir Joseph Cowen
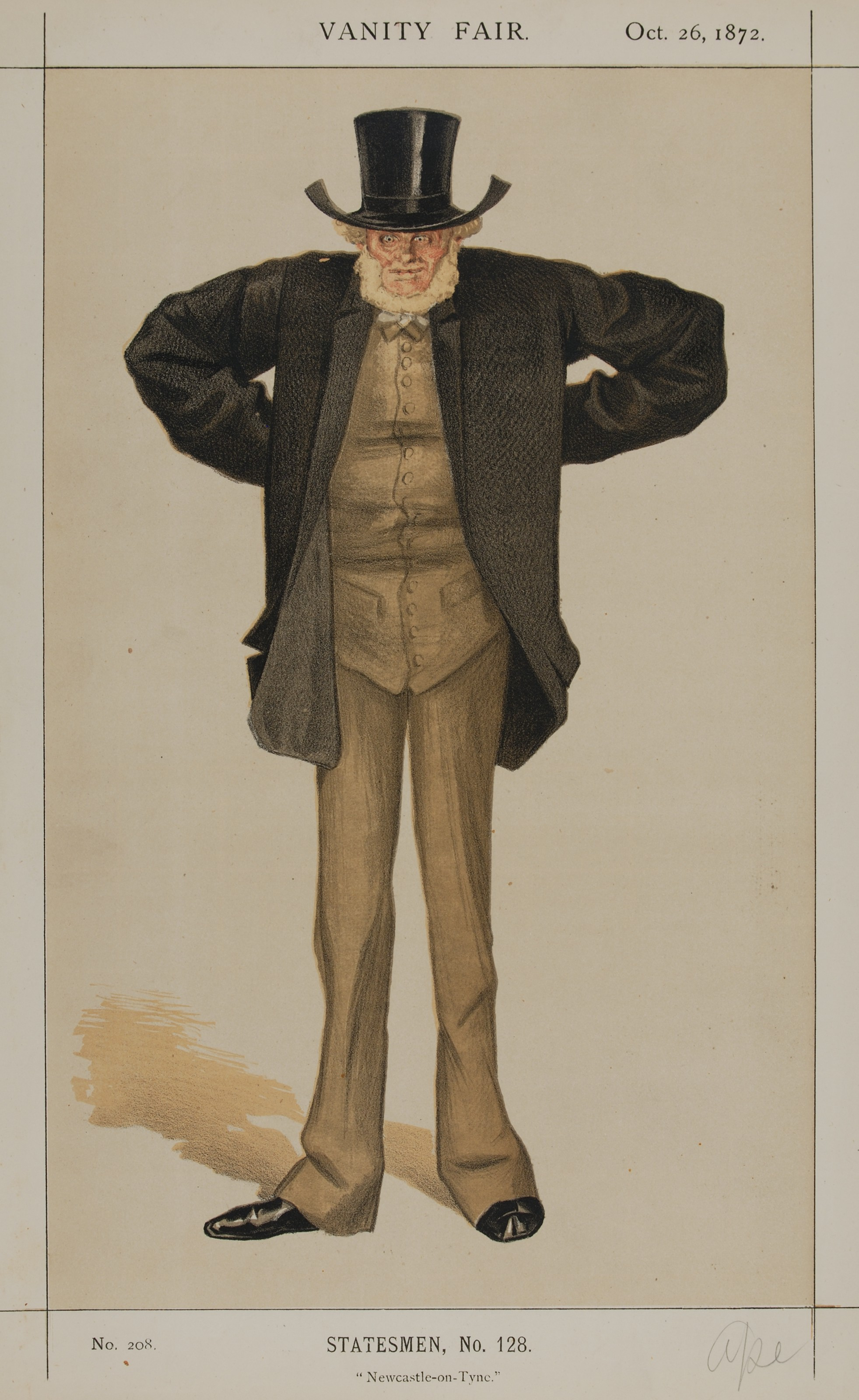
- Caricature of Cowen in Vanity Fair in 1872

Member of Parliament for Newcastle-upon-Tyne
- In office 12 July 1865 – 19 December 1873 Serving with Thomas Emerson Headlam
- Preceded by: Thomas Emerson Headlam; Somerset Beaumont
- Succeeded by: Thomas Emerson Headlam; Joseph Cowen

Personal details
- Born: 10 February 1800 Greenside, County Durham
- Died: 19 December 1873 (aged 73) Stella Hall, Blaydon-on-Tyne, County Durham
- Resting place: St Paul's, Winlaton, County Durham
- Party: Liberal
- Spouse: Mary Newton (m. 1851, died)
- Children: Five, including Joseph Cowen
- Parent: John Cowen

Sir Joseph Cowen (10 February 1800 – 19 December 1873) was a British Liberal Party politician and manufacturer.

== Family ==
Born in Greenside, County Durham, Cowen was the son of John Cowen. He married Mary Newton, daughter of Anthony Newton, in 1851; they had five children, including Joseph and John.

== Business career ==
Cowen was first apprenticed as a blacksmith in Winlaton, County Durham, at age 19, before later becoming a colliery owner, director of a shipping company, first secretary of the Blacksmiths' Friendly Society, and an original gentleman of the Four & Twenty. He was a coal owner and firebrick and clay retort manufacturer, having inherited the Blaydon Burn factory, near Newcastle-upon-Tyne, from his father, where he joined his brother-in-law. Later, he became a Justice of the Peace for County Durham and an alderman for Newcastle.

In 1850 he bought Stella Hall, a 17th-century mansion near Blaydon.

He was also a life member and chairman of the River Tyne improvement commission, helping make the river navigable for sea-going ships, for which he was knighted on 14 March 1872.

== Political career ==
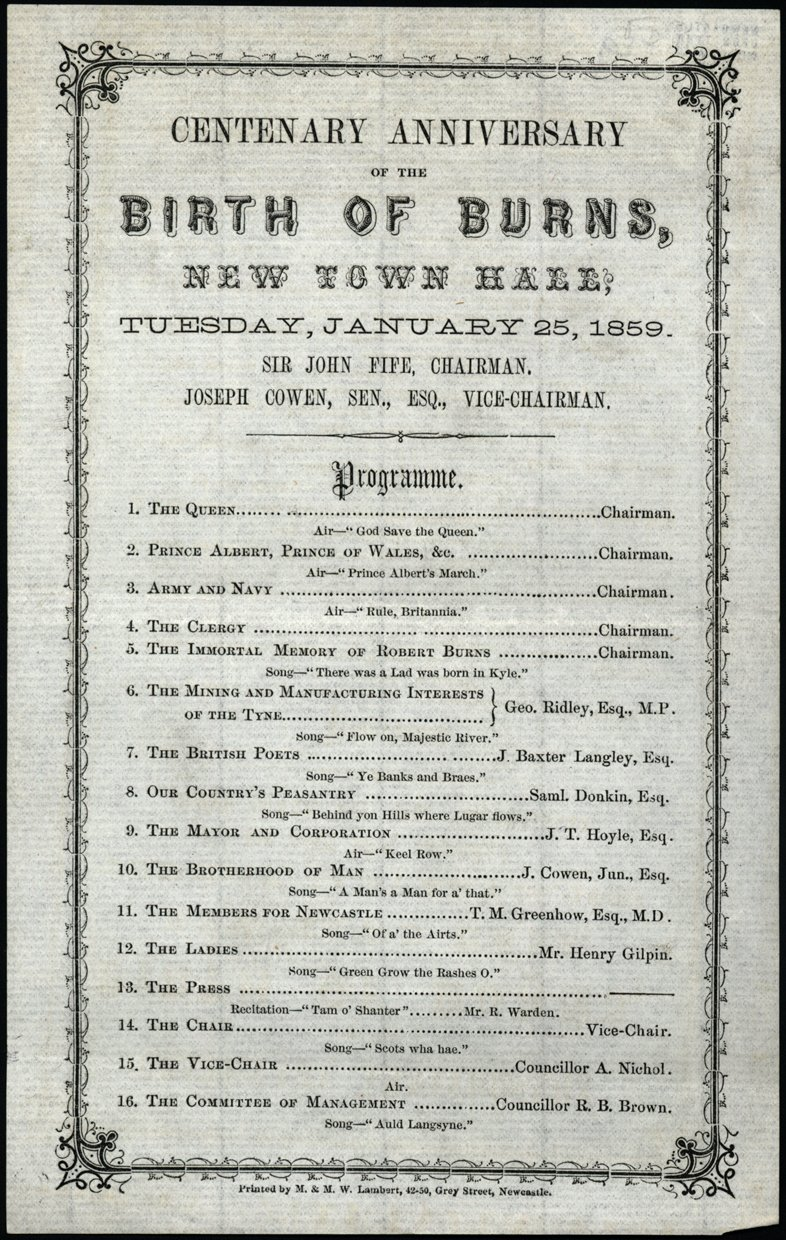
Programme for an 1859 'Birth of Burns' event, held at Newcastle-upon-Tyne, England, with Cowen as vice-chairman (transcription)

Cowen demonstrated his political ambition early, protesting the Peterloo Massacre in 1819 and becoming an early member of the Anti-Corn Law League, as well as the National Political Union.

He was elected Liberal MP with radical principles for Newcastle-upon-Tyne at the 1865 general election. While in Parliament, he advocated Church of England disestablishment and game law abolition, shorter parliamentary terms, and redistribution and equalisation of the franchise between counties and boroughs. He also refused to support Irish coercion and aided in the Cobden–Chevalier Treaty with France. He held the seat until his death in 1873, when he was succeeded by his son at the ensuing by-election.

== Death ==
Cowen died at his home, Stella Hall, on 19 December 1873. He was buried in St Paul's Churchyard in Winlaton.

Parliament of the United Kingdom
Preceded by Thomas Emerson Headlam; Somerset Beaumont	Member of Parliament for Newcastle-upon-Tyne; 1865–1868; With: Thomas Emerson Headlam	Succeeded by Thomas Emerson Headlam; Joseph Cowen
