= James Craig (MP for Newcastle) =

British Liberal Party politician

James Craig (1834 – 28 August 1902) was a British Liberal Party politician who served as Member of Parliament for Newcastle-upon-Tyne from 1886 until 1892.

== Career ==
Craig was born in 1834 to Thomas Craig, a brushmaker, and his mother Elizabeth Jobling; he was educated at St. Thomas's school, Newcastle upon Tyne. He began working as a clerk in the firm of Messrs. Borries and Co., export merchants and shipbrokers in Newcastle, and later became a partner when the firm's name changed to Borries, Craig & Co. Ltd. He was known as an authority on mercantile matters, and spoke several languages.

Craig was active in local politics in Newcastle, and was a member of the River Tyne Commission. He was elected to the House of Commons in the 1886 general election, but was defeated at the next election in 1892. He contested the seat again in 1895, but was unsuccessful.

He died on 28 August 1902 at Reading, Berkshire, where he had been living since retirement for the later years of his life.

== Family ==
Craig married first, in 1858, Annie Eliza Jordan, daughter of Joseph Jordan, of Hornsey. He married secondly in 1865 to Kate Sophia Hould, daughter of James Hould, of Wanstead. Their son was Herbert James Craig (1869–1934), who likewise was a Liberal Member of Parliament.

Parliament of the United Kingdom
Preceded by Joseph Cowen and John Morley	Member of Parliament for Newcastle-upon-Tyne; 1886 – 1892; With: John Morley	Succeeded by Sir Charles Frederic Hamond and John Morley
