= Robert Ellison (politician) =

English politician (1614–1678)

Robert Ellison (2 February 1614 – 12 January 1678) was an English politician who sat in the House of Commons at various times between 1647 and 1660.

Ellison was the son of Cuthbert Ellison of Newcastle-upon-Tyne, a merchant adventurer, and his wife Jane Isle, daughter of Charles Isle. He was Sheriff of Newcastle in 1646.

In 1647, Ellison replaced as Member of Parliament for Newcastle-upon-Tyne in the Long Parliament a member whose election had been declared void. He was secluded from sitting in the succeeding Rump Parliament. In 1660, he returned to Parliament as MP for Newcastle-upon-Tyne in the Convention Parliament.

Ellison died at the age of 63. He had married firstly Elizabeth Grey, daughter of Cuthbert Grey of Newcastle, and secondly on 27 July 1672 Agnes Briggs, widow of James Broggs of Newcastle.

Parliament of England
Preceded by Sir Henry Anderson; John Blackstone	Member of Parliament for Newcastle-upon-Tyne; 1647–1660; With: Sir Henry Anderson	Succeeded by Rump Parliament
