= Cuthbert Ellison (Newcastle MP) =

British Whig politician (1783–1860)

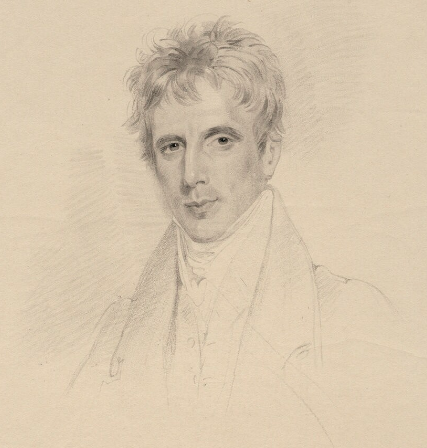
- Ellison in 1830

Member of Parliament for Newcastle-upon-Tyne
- In office 10 October 1812 – 30 July 1830 Serving with Sir Matthew White Ridley
- Preceded by: Matthew White Ridley; Charles John Brandling
- Succeeded by: John Hodgson; Sir Matthew White Ridley

Personal details
- Born: 12 July 1783
- Died: 13 June 1860 (aged 76)
- Party: Whig

Cuthbert Ellison (12 July 1783 – 13 June 1860) was a British Whig politician.

He was born the son of Henry Ellison in Hebburn, County Durham and inherited his father's estate in 1795, aged 12. He was educated at Harrow School and Christ's College, Cambridge. He became a Gateshead borough holder in 1809, governor of the Gateshead Dispensary in 1839, and president in 1841. He was appointed High Sheriff of Durham in 1828.

He was elected as a member of parliament (MP) for Newcastle upon Tyne at the 1812 general election and held the seat until he stood down at the 1830 general election. His generous contributions helped fund Gateshead buildings such as Trinity Chapel and St Mary's Church amongst other charitable donations. He lived in Gateshead Park (Park House) until 1825 when he moved to Hebburn Hall. He died in London in 1860.

== Family ==
He married Isabella Grace Ibbetson. His daughter Sarah Caroline, married Walter James, 1st Baron Northbourne. Another daughter, Isabella Caroline, married George Venables-Vernon, 5th Baron Vernon.

Ellison's brother Robert was an officer in the British Army who fought at the 1815 Battle of Waterloo and represented him at the Newcastle upon Tyne Parliamentary election of 1820.

Parliament of the United Kingdom
Preceded by Sir Matthew White Ridley, 2nd Bt; Charles John Brandling	Member of Parliament for Newcastle upon Tyne; 1812 – 1830; With: Sir Matthew White Ridley, 3rd Bt	Succeeded by John Hodgson; Sir Matthew White Ridley, 3rd Bt
