= Matthew Ridley (barrister) =

Matthew Ridley (14 November 1711 – 6 April 1778), of Heaton, Northumberland, was a barrister, country gentleman, brewer, coal magnate, owner of glass-works, and governor of a company of merchant adventurers in Newcastle upon Tyne. He was four times mayor of the borough and from 1747 to 1774 also represented it as a member of parliament in the House of Commons.

== Early life ==
The Ridley family had belonged to the landed gentry of Northumberland since the early 15th century. Ridley was the eldest son of Richard Ridley of Heaton and Newcastle upon Tyne, by his marriage to Margaret White, a daughter of Matthew White of Blagdon. His father owned collieries at Heaton. The young Ridley was educated at Westminster School, where he arrived in 1724, St John's College, Oxford, where he matriculated in December 1727, aged sixteen, and Gray's Inn, to which he was admitted in 1728. He was created a Master of Arts at Oxford in 1730 and was called to the bar in 1732.

On 2 November 1739, Ridley’s father died, and he succeeded him.

== Career ==
Ridley was elected as Mayor of Newcastle in 1733. By 1739, the year of his father’s death, he was governor of the Newcastle-upon-Tyne Company of Merchant Adventurers and was also a coal magnate, the owner of a brewery and a glass-works, and a leader of the Newcastle business community. He was elected as mayor three more times, in 1745, 1751, and 1759.

In 1747 Ridley was first elected as one of the two members of parliament for the borough of Newcastle and was returned unopposed at all later elections. He had no Government contracts, offices, or honours, and was as independent in spirit as the other member for the borough, Walter Blackett, but was usually considered a government supporter. In November 1762, the Whig leader the Duke of Newcastle listed Ridley as ‘doubtful’, but on 10 May 1764 he marked him down as a ‘sure friend’, and on 2 March 1767 as a friend. In the Parliament of 1768, every recorded vote of Ridley’s was against the government. He retired from parliament undefeated in 1774 and was succeeded by his son Sir Matthew White Ridley, 2nd Baronet, who by a special remainder had already succeeded to the baronetcy of his mother’s brother and the Blagdon Hall estate.

Ridley became a Bencher of his Inn in 1749 and was Treasurer of Gray’s Inn in 1765.

A monument to Ridley was erected in 1787 in Newcastle Cathedral sculpted by John Bacon.

== Private life ==
In 1735, Ridley married firstly, and secretly, Hannah, a daughter of Joseph Barnes of Newcastle, merchant, and they had one son. The marriage was declared clandestine and unlawful, so on 3 May 1736 it was repeated, but this time under the names of Matthew Roberts and Hannah Booth. However, Hannah died on 7 November 1741.

On 18 November 1742, Ridley married secondly Elizabeth, a daughter of Matthew White of Blagdon and a sister of Sir Matthew White, 1st Baronet. They had eight sons (two of whom died in childhood) and four daughters.

The only child of the first marriage, Nicholas Ridley, born in London on 5 July 1736, rose to the rank of major in a foot regiment, but did not inherit the estate at Heaton. Despite this he remained on friendly terms with the sons of Matthew Ridley’s second wife.
