= Acton family =

14th-century English political family

The Acton family was a 14th-century English political family. The four members, Laurence Acton Sr., Laurence Acton Jr., William Acton Sr., and William Acton Jr., all served as members of parliament (MPs).

== Members ==
=== William Acton Sr. ===
William Acton was bailiff of Newcastle upon Tyne "almost continuously" from 1336 until 1351. He represented the town's constituency as MP twice during this period. Two of his sons – William Jr. and Laurence Sr. – and a grandson Laurence Acton Jr. were also MPs.

=== William Acton Jr. ===
William Acton was an English politician who was MP for an unknown constituency and a mayor of Newcastle upon Tyne. The History of Parliament Online described his career as having been similar to that of his father, William Acton Sr., also an MP from Newcastle. His younger brother, Laurence Acton Sr. and nephew, Laurence Acton Jr., were also MPs.

=== Laurence Acton Sr. ===
Laurence Acton (died 1386 or 1387) was a Member of Parliament during the 1370s and a six-time bailiff of Newcastle upon Tyne. His father, William Acton, his elder brother – also named William – and his namesake son, were all MPs.

=== Laurence Acton Jr. ===
Laurence Acton (died 1410) was an English politician. He sat as MP for Newcastle-upon-Tyne in 1386, 1391, September 1397, and 1399.

Acton also served as bailiff of Newcastle-upon-Tyne from Michaelmas 1385 till 1393, as Mayor from 1393 till 1396, as Justice of the peace on 26 December 1390 and as commissioner of inquiry in Northumberland in June 1399 and July 1401.

Acton was the son and heir of Laurence Acton and Elizabeth, the daughter of Sir William Sturmyn. He married and had at least one son.

In the early 1380s, Acton served in the retinue of Henry, Earl of Northumberland helping defend Berwick-upon-Tweed. In January 1387, following his father's death, he inherited the family's estates. In January 1388, he was summoned before the King and Council at Westminster regarding matters connected with his father's estate though the outcome is unknown.

Acton died shortly before October 1410 when a writ of diem clausit extremum (Latin: "he has closed his last day") was issued in his name.
