= Joseph Cowen =

English radical Liberal politician and journalist

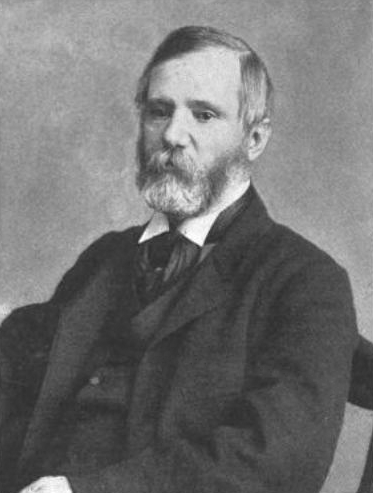
Joseph Cowen Jr.

Joseph Cowen, Jr., (9 July 1829 – 18 February 1900) was an English radical Liberal politician and journalist. He was a firm friend to Anglo-Jewry, and an early advocate of Jewish emancipation, regularly contributing to The Jewish Chronicle.

== Early life ==
The son of Joseph Cowen, Snr, a prominent businessman and Member of Parliament (MP) for Newcastle upon Tyne from 1874 to 1886, he was born Blaydon, near Newcastle. Cowen junior was educated privately in Ryton and at the University of Edinburgh, where he developed an interest in the revolutionary political movements of Europe.

He then joined his father in the fire brick business, Joseph Cowen & Co., established at Braydon in 1828. Cowen numbered among his friends Mazzini, Louis Blanc and Ledru-Rollin, as well as Alexander Herzen and Bakunin. Garibaldi, Felice Orsini and Lajos Kossuth came to visit him in Blaydon. He supported the miners and improved the lot of the working-classes by campaigning for better housing and social welfare reform. One area of improvement revisited again by Cowen was education: changes to the Mechanics Working-men institute were followed by a public library for Newcastle.

In 1850 his father bought Stella Hall, a 17th-century mansion near Blaydon, which continued in the Cowen family until 1948 and was demolished in 1955.

== Political career ==
In 1874, he was elected Member of Parliament, succeeding his father, who had held the Newcastle seat as a Liberal since 1865.

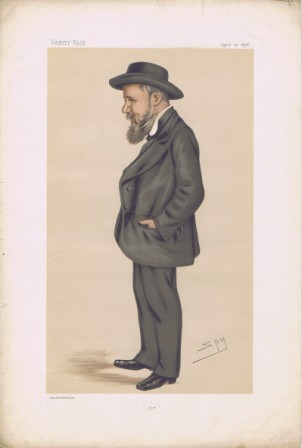
"Joe": caricature by Spy published in Vanity Fair in 1878

A radical on domestic questions when elected, Cowen was also a sympathizer with Irish Nationalism, In speech, dress and manner he identified himself with the coal miners of North East England. According to Dilke he spoke with a distinctive Tyneside burr. To the consternation of Liberal operatives, Cowen vigorously supported Disraeli's foreign policy, and in 1881 opposed the Gladstonian settlement with the Boers.

On 13 July 1876, he joined John Bright in introducing Joseph Chamberlain into the Commons as the new MP for Birmingham.

Short in stature and uncouth in appearance, Cowen was unusual for wearing a soft hat in parliament, breaking with convention. His individuality first shocked and then by its earnestness impressed the House of Commons; and his sturdy independence of party ties, combined with a gift of rough but genuine eloquence (of which his speech on the Royal Title Bill of 1876 was an example), rapidly made him one of the best-known public men in the country.

His independence (which his detractors attributed in some degree to his alleged susceptibility to Tory compliments) brought him into collision both with the Liberal parliamentary party and with the party organization in Newcastle itself, but Cowen's personal popularity and his remarkable powers as an orator triumphed in his own birthplace, and he was again elected in 1885.

== Other interests ==
Cowen retired both from parliament and from public life in 1886, professing his disgust at the party intrigues of politics, and devoted himself to conducting the Newcastle Daily Chronicle (which he had established in 1858), and to his private business. In this capacity he exercised a wide influence on local opinion, and the revolt of the Newcastle electorate in later years against "doctrinaire Radicalism" was largely due to his constant preaching of a broader outlook on national affairs. He served as president of the first day of the 1873 Co-operative Congress.

Behind the scenes, he continued to play a powerful part in forming North-country opinion until his death. His letters were published by his daughter in 1909.

== Legacy ==
A fine bronze statue of Cowen stands in Westgate Road in Newcastle upon Tyne.

His name lives on in The Joseph Cowen Lifelong Learning Centre, a Charitable Incorporated Organisation also based in Newcastle upon Tyne, delivering the 'Explore' lecture programme.

== Bibliography ==
- Allen, Joan (2007). Joseph Cowen and Popular Radicalism on Tyneside 1829–1900.
- Fynes, Richard (1873). Miners of Northumberland and Durham. Newcastle upon Tyne.
- Jones, Evan Rowland (1885) [n.d.]. The Life and Speeches of Joseph Cowen, M.P. London: Sampson Low, Marston, Searle, and Rivington.
- Waitt, E. I. (October 1972). John Morley, Joseph Cowen and Robert Spence Watson: Liberal divisions in Newcastle Politics, 1873-1895. unpublished to University of Manchester, PhD Thesis. Copies in Manchester University, Newcastle Central and Gateshead libraries.

Parliament of the United Kingdom
Preceded by Sir Joseph Cowen; Thomas Emerson Headlam	Member of Parliament for Newcastle-upon-Tyne; 1874 – 1886; With: Thomas Emerson Headlam 1874; Charles Frederic Hamond 1874–1880; Ashton Wentworth Dilke 1880–1883; John Morley 1883–1886	Succeeded by John Morley; James Craig
