= William Henry Ridley =

- Born: 2 April 1816
- Died: 17 February 1882 (aged 65); Brighton, East Sussex
- Education: Christ Church, Oxford
- Spouse: Sophia Albertina
- Children: Henry Colborne Mannoir Ridley

Ecclesiastical career
- Religion: Christianity (Anglican)
- Church: Church of England

William Henry Ridley (2 April 1816 – 17 February 1882) was a priest in the Church of England and an author.

== Life ==
Ridley, born on 2 April 1816, was eldest son of Henry Colborne Ridley (1780–1832), rector of Hambleden, near Henley-on-Thames, a descendant of the Ridleys of Willimoteswick. His mother was Mary Ferrer, daughter of James Ferrier of Lincoln's Inn Fields. He matriculated from Christ Church, Oxford, on 15 May 1834, was a student 1836–41, and graduated BA in 1838, and MA in 1840.

He succeeded to the family living of Hambleden on 25 July 1840, and continued there until his death. In 1859 he became rural dean of Wycombe, and in 1871 an honorary canon of Christ Church, Oxford.

He died at Brighton on 17 February 1882, having married, on 25 August 1841, Sophia Albertina, second daughter of Charles Richard Sumner, bishop of Winchester who died on 1 July 1884. The couple had a son, Henry Colborne Mannoir Ridley and a daughter, Maria Sophia Ridley Wetherall.

== Publications ==
Ridley was a voluminous writer of theological literature, but many of his publications are only single sermons and tracts. The latter include two ‘Plain Tracts on Confirmation’ (1844 and 1862), which had a wide circulation. His chief works are:

- The Holy Communion, parts i. and ii. 1854; 3rd edit. 1860.
- What can we do for our Soldiers in the East? 1854.
- Clerical Incomes and Clerical Taxation; Dr. Phillimore's Bill for the Assessment of Tithe Commutation Rent Charges, 1856.
- What can we do for our Fellow Subjects in India? 1857.
- Bible readings for family prayers (Rivingtons, 1868)
- The Athanasian Creed: a plain tract Talbot collection of British pamphlets (Rivingtons, 1872)
