= Newcastle-upon-Tyne (constituency) =

Parliamentary constituency in the United Kingdom, 1801–1918

- Former borough constituency for the House of Commons
- County: Northumberland
- Major settlements: Newcastle upon Tyne

1283–1918
- Seats: Two
- Replaced by: Newcastle upon Tyne Central, Newcastle upon Tyne East, Newcastle upon Tyne North and Newcastle upon Tyne West

Newcastle-upon-Tyne was a parliamentary borough in the county of Northumberland of the House of Commons of England from 1283 to 1706, then of the House of Commons of Great Britain from 1707 to 1800 and of the House of Commons of the United Kingdom from 1801 to 1918. It returned two Members of Parliament (MPs), elected by the bloc vote system.

Newcastle first sent Members to Parliament in 1283, although it was not always possible to act upon the writ of summons, which was disregarded on at least four occasions (1315, 1327, 1332 and 1337) because of warfare with the Scots.

The constituency was abolished in 1918, being split into four divisions; Newcastle upon Tyne Central, Newcastle upon Tyne East, Newcastle upon Tyne North and Newcastle upon Tyne West.

== Boundaries ==
The constituency was based upon the town, later city, of Newcastle upon Tyne in the historic county of Northumberland in North East England. In 1848, the constituency boundaries were described in A Topographical Dictionary of England.

The borough first exercised the elective franchise in the 23rd of Edward the First, since which time it has returned two members to parliament: the present electoral limits are co-extensive with those of the county of the town, comprising 5730 acres; the old boundaries, which were abrogated in 1832, included 2700 acres only.

When the House of Commons debated the boundaries to be used from 1832, the Tory Party suggested including Gateshead (to the south) and South Shields (to the east) within the Newcastle-upon-Tyne constituency. The Whigs resisted this idea, so these two neighbouring settlements were not incorporated into this seat.

The contents of the parliamentary borough, as defined by the Parliamentary Boundaries Act 1832 (2 and 3 Wm. 4, c. 64) were:

The Town and County of the Town of Newcastle and the several Townships of Byker, Heaton, Jesmond, Westgate, and Elswick.

The boundaries remained unchanged from 1832 until the area was divided into single member constituencies in 1918. These were not necessarily identical to the boundaries used for local government purposes.

In the period after 1885, the constituency was surrounded by Wansbeck to the west and north, Tyneside to the north east and east, Jarrow to the south east, Gateshead to the south, and Chester-le-Street to the south west.

== Members of Parliament ==
Party affiliations are derived from Stook Smith and Craig (see reference section below). Tory is used prior to the 1835 general election and Conservative from that time. Liberal candidates (as listed by Craig) before the formal creation of the party, shortly after the 1859 general election, are listed as Whig or Radical if the information is available in the work by Stooks Smith.

MPs, who were known by the same name, are distinguished in the table below and the election results by a number in brackets after the name. It is not suggested that such numbers were used by contemporaries of the individuals so numbered.

=== MPs 1336–1660 ===
Parliament	First member	Second member
1336	William Acton (senior)	
1378	William Bishopdale	
1381	William Bishopdale	
1386	John Howell	Laurence Acton
1388 (February)	William Bishopdale	Sampson Hardyng
1388 (September)	Henry Carlisle	Stephen Whitgray
1390 (January)	William Bishopdale	Stephen Whitgray
1390 (November)		
1391	William Bishopdale	Laurence Acton
1393	John Morton	Richard/William Langton
1394	Henry Carlisle	Thomas Diringdon
1395	John Morton	William Langton
1397 (January)	William Redmarshall	Sampson Hardyng
1397 (September)	William Redmarshall	Laurence Acton
1399	Roger Thornton	Laurence Acton
1401		
1402	Robert Darcy	Richard Beverley
1404 (January)		
1404 (October)		
1406	John Paulyn	Robert Hebburn
1407	William Johnson	William Langton
1410		
1411	Roger Thornton	Roger Booth
1413 (February)		
1413 (May)	Richard Dalton	Robert Whelpington
1414 (April)	William Middleton	Robert Swinburne
1414 (November)	William Johnson	Robert Whelpington
1415	Roger Booth	Robert Whelpington
1416 (March)	Roger Booth	Thomas Hebburn
1416 (October)		
1417	Roger Thornton	John Strother
1419	Roger Thornton	John Strother
1420	Roger Booth	John Wall
1421 (May)	Emericus Hering	John Strother
1421 (December)	Roger Booth	William Ellerby
1510-1523	No names known	
1529	Sir Thomas Tempest	Henry Anderson
1536	?Sir Thomas Tempest	?
1539	?	
1542	?	
1545	Sir Robert Bowes	Robert Brandling
1547	Sir Francis Leke	Sir Robert Brandling
1553 (March)	Robert Lewen	Bertram Anderson
1553 (October)	Sir Robert Brandling	Edward Hall
1554 (April)	Bertram Anderson	Cuthbert Horsley
1554 (November)	Bertram Anderson	John Watson
1555	Sir Robert Brandling	Cuthbert Blount
1558	Bertram Anderson	Robert Lewen
1559 (January)	Robert Lewen	Cuthbert Blount
1562 (December)	Sir Robert Brandling	Bertram Anderson
1571	William Carr	William Jenison I
1572 (April)	William Jenison I	William Selby
1584	William Jenison I	Henry Anderson
1586	Henry Anderson	Edward Lewen
1588 (October)	Henry Anderson	Henry Mitford
1593	Henry Anderson	Henry Mitford
1597 (October)	Henry Chapman	Henry Lindley
1601 (October)	William Jenison II	George Selby
1604	George Selby	Henry Chapman
1614	Henry Anderson	William Jenison II
1621	Henry Anderson	Sir Thomas Ridell
1624	Sir Peter Riddel	Sir Henry Anderson
1625	Sir Thomas Ridell	Sir Henry Anderson
1626	Sir Peter Riddel	Sir Henry Anderson
1628	Sir Peter Riddel	Sir Thomas Ridell
1629–1640	No Parliaments convened	
1640 (April)	Sir Peter Riddel	Thomas Liddel
1640 (November)	Sir Henry Anderson, disabled 1643	John Blakiston
1645	Sir Henry Anderson	John Blakiston, replaced 1647 by Robert Ellison)
1648	Robert Ellison	John Blakiston, died 1649
1654	Sir Arthur Hesilrige	(One seat only)
1656	Walter Strickland	(One seat only)
1659	Mark Shaftoe (of Newcastle)	Thomas Lilburne

=== MPs 1660–1918 ===
Election	1st member	1st party	2nd member	2nd party
1660	Robert Ellison		Sir Francis Anderson	
1661	Sir John Marlay		Sir Francis Anderson	
1673	Sir William Blackett, Bt (1)		Sir Francis Anderson	
1679	Sir William Blackett, Bt (1)		Sir Ralph Carr	
1680	Sir Nathaniel Johnson		Sir Ralph Carr	
1685	Sir Nathaniel Johnson		Sir William Blackett, Bt (2)	
1689	Sir Ralph Carr	Tory	Sir William Blackett, Bt (2)	
1690	Sir Ralph Carr	Tory	William Carr (1)	Tory
1695	Sir William Blackett, Bt (2)	Whig	William Carr (1)	Tory
1700	Sir Henry Liddell, Bt	Whig	William Carr (1)	Tory
1705	Sir William Blackett, Bt (2)	Whig	William Carr (1)	Tory
1706	Sir Henry Liddell, Bt	Whig	William Carr (1)	Tory
1710	Sir William Blackett, Bt (3) died 1728; declared not duly elected in 1727, in 1729		William Wrightson	
1722	Sir William Blackett, Bt (3) died 1728; declared not duly elected in 1727, in 1729		William Carr (2)	
1727	Sir William Blackett, Bt (3) died 1728; declared not duly elected in 1727, in 1729		Nicholas Fenwick	
1729 on petition	William Carr (2)		Nicholas Fenwick	
1734	Sir Walter Calverley-Blackett, Bt		Nicholas Fenwick	
1747	Sir Walter Calverley-Blackett, Bt		Matthew Ridley	
1774	Sir Walter Calverley-Blackett, Bt		Sir Matthew White Ridley, Bt (1)	
1777	Sir John Trevelyan, Bt		Sir Matthew White Ridley, Bt (1)	
1780	Andrew Robinson Stoney		Sir Matthew White Ridley, Bt (1)	
1784	Charles Brandling	Tory	Sir Matthew White Ridley, Bt (1)	Whig
1798 by-election	Charles John Brandling	Tory	Sir Matthew White Ridley, Bt (1)	Whig
1812	Sir Matthew White Ridley, Bt (2)	Whig	Cuthbert Ellison	Whig
1830	Sir Matthew White Ridley, Bt (2)	Whig	John Hodgson	Tory
1834	Sir Matthew White Ridley, Bt (2)	Whig	John Hodgson	Conservative
1835	Sir Matthew White Ridley, Bt (2)	Whig	William Ord	Whig
1836 by-election	John Hodgson; John Hodgson-Hinde from August 1836	Conservative	William Ord	Whig
1847	Thomas Emerson Headlam	Whig	William Ord	Whig
1852	Thomas Emerson Headlam	Whig	John Blackett	Whig
1856 by-election	Thomas Emerson Headlam	Whig	George Ridley	Whig
1859	Thomas Emerson Headlam	Liberal	George Ridley	Liberal
1860	Thomas Emerson Headlam	Liberal	Somerset Beaumont	Liberal
1865	Thomas Emerson Headlam	Liberal	Sir Joseph Cowen (1)	Liberal
1874 by-election	Thomas Emerson Headlam	Liberal	Joseph Cowen (2)	Liberal
1874	Charles Frederick Hamond	Conservative	Joseph Cowen (2)	Liberal
1880	Ashton Wentworth Dilke	Liberal	Joseph Cowen (2)	Liberal
1883 by-election	John Morley	Liberal	Joseph Cowen (2)	Liberal
1885	John Morley	Liberal	Joseph Cowen (2)	Independent Liberal
1886	John Morley	Liberal	James Craig	Liberal
1892	John Morley	Liberal	Sir Charles Frederick Hamond	Conservative
1895	William Cruddas	Conservative	Sir Charles Frederick Hamond	Conservative
1900	Sir Walter Richard Plummer	Conservative	George Renwick	Conservative
1906	Walter Hudson	Labour	Thomas Cairns	Liberal
1908 by-election	Walter Hudson	Labour	George Renwick	Conservative
1910 (January)	Walter Hudson	Labour	Edward Shortt	Liberal
1916	Walter Hudson	Labour	Edward Shortt	Coalition Liberal
1918	Constituency abolished			

== Elections ==
The bloc vote electoral system was used in elections to fill two seats and first past the post for single member by-elections. Each voter had up to as many votes as there were seats to be filled. Votes had to be cast by a spoken declaration, in public, at the hustings (until the secret ballot was introduced in 1872).

Note on percentage change calculations: Where there was only one candidate of a party in successive elections, for the same number of seats, change is calculated on the party percentage vote. Where there was more than one candidate, in one or both successive elections for the same number of seats, then change is calculated on the individual percentage vote (if applicable).

The reference to some candidates as Non Partisan does not, necessarily, mean that they did not have a party allegiance. It means that the sources consulted did not specify a party allegiance.

Before the Representation of the People Act 1832, the borough had an electorate limited to its freemen. There were about 2,500 voters in the second half of the 18th century.

1710s – 1720s – 1730s – 1740s – 1750s – 1760s – 1770s – 1780s – 1790s – 1800s – 1810s – 1820s – 1830s

=== Elections of the 1710s ===
General election 1710: Newcastle-upon-Tyne (2 seats)
Party	Candidate	Votes	%	±%
Nonpartisan	William Blackett (3)	1,177	44.0	N/A
Nonpartisan	William Wrightson	886	33.2	N/A
Nonpartisan	William Carr (2)	609	22.8	N/A
Turnout		2,672	N/A	N/A

General election 1715: Newcastle-upon-Tyne (2 seats)
Party	Candidate	Votes	%	±%
Nonpartisan	William Blackett (3)	639	44.0	...
Nonpartisan	William Wrightson	550	37.9	+4.7
Nonpartisan	James Clavering	263	18.1	N/A
Turnout		1,452	N/A	N/A

=== Elections of the 1720s ===
General election 1722: Newcastle-upon-Tyne (2 seats)
Party	Candidate	Votes	%	±%
Nonpartisan	William Carr (2)	1,264	38.3	N/A
Nonpartisan	William Blackett(3)	1,158	35.9	−8.1
Nonpartisan	William Wrightson	831	25.8	−12.1
Turnout		3,223	N/A	N/A

General election 1727: Newcastle-upon-Tyne (2 seats)
Party	Candidate	Votes	%	±%
Nonpartisan	William Blackett (3)	1,202	39.9	+4.0
Nonpartisan	Nicholas Fenwick	1,189	39.5	N/A
Nonpartisan	William Carr (2)	620	20.6	−17.7
Turnout		3,011	N/A	N/A

- Death of Blackett, in 1728
- On petition Carr vice Blackett

=== Elections of the 1730s ===
General election 1734: Newcastle-upon-Tyne (2 seats)
Party	Candidate	Votes	%	±%
Nonpartisan	Walter Calverley-Blackett	1,354	42.9	N/A
Nonpartisan	Nicholas Fenwick	1,083	34.3	−5.2
Nonpartisan	William Carr (2)	716	22.7	−2.1
Turnout		3,153 (1,795 electors)	N/A	N/A

=== Elections of the 1740s ===
General election 1741: Newcastle-upon-Tyne (2 seats)
Party	Candidate	Votes	%	±%
Nonpartisan	Walter Calverley-Blackett	1,453	32.3	−10.6
Nonpartisan	Nicholas Fenwick	1,231	27.4	−6.9
Nonpartisan	Matthew Ridley	1,131	25.1	N/A
Nonpartisan	William Carr (2)	683	15.2	−7.5
Turnout		4,498 (2,391 electors)	N/A	N/A

General election 1747: Newcastle-upon-Tyne (2 seats)
Party	Candidate	Votes	%	±%
Nonpartisan	Walter Calverley-Blackett	Unopposed	N/A	N/A
Nonpartisan	Matthew Ridley	Unopposed	N/A	N/A

=== Elections of the 1750s ===
General election 17 April 1754: Newcastle-upon-Tyne (2 seats)
Party	Candidate	Votes	%	±%
Nonpartisan	Walter Calverley-Blackett	Unopposed	N/A	N/A
Nonpartisan	Matthew Ridley	Unopposed	N/A	N/A

=== Elections of the 1760s ===
General election 27 March 1761: Newcastle-upon-Tyne (2 seats)
Party	Candidate	Votes	%	±%
Nonpartisan	Walter Calverley-Blackett	Unopposed	N/A	N/A
Nonpartisan	Matthew Ridley	Unopposed	N/A	N/A

General election 21 March 1768: Newcastle-upon-Tyne (2 seats)
Party	Candidate	Votes	%	±%
Nonpartisan	Walter Calverley-Blackett	Unopposed	N/A	N/A
Nonpartisan	Matthew Ridley	Unopposed	N/A	N/A

=== Elections of the 1770s ===
General election 11 October 1774: Newcastle-upon-Tyne (2 seats)
Party	Candidate	Votes	%	±%
Nonpartisan	Walter Calverley-Blackett	1,432	33.2	N/A
Nonpartisan	Sir Matthew White Ridley (1)	1,411	32.7	N/A
Nonpartisan	Constantine Phipps	795	18.4	N/A
Nonpartisan	Thomas Delaval	677	15.7	N/A
Turnout		4,315 (2,162 electors)	N/A	N/A

- Death of Blackett

By-election 27 February 1777: Newcastle-upon-Tyne
Party	Candidate	Votes	%	±%
Nonpartisan	John Trevelyan	1,163	52.1	N/A
Nonpartisan	Andrew Stoney-Bowes	1,068	47.9	N/A
Majority		95	4.3	N/A
Turnout		2,231	N/A	N/A
Nonpartisan hold		Swing	N/A	

=== Elections of the 1780s ===
General election 11 September 1780: Newcastle-upon-Tyne (2 seats)
Party	Candidate	Votes	%	±%
Nonpartisan	Sir Matthew White Ridley (1)	1,408	38.8	+6.1
Nonpartisan	Andrew Stoney-Bowes	1,135	31.3	N/A
Nonpartisan	Thomas Delaval	1,085	29.9	+14.2
Turnout		3,628 (2,245 electors)	N/A	N/A

General election 26 April 1784: Newcastle-upon-Tyne (2 seats)
Party	Candidate	Votes	%	±%
Whig	Matthew White Ridley (1)	Unopposed	N/A	N/A
Tory	Charles Brandling	Unopposed	N/A	N/A

=== Elections of the 1790s ===
General election 1790: Newcastle-upon-Tyne (2 seats)
Party	Candidate	Votes	%	±%
Whig	Matthew White Ridley (1)	Unopposed	N/A	N/A
Tory	Charles Brandling	Unopposed	N/A	N/A

General election 1796: Newcastle-upon-Tyne (2 seats)
Party	Candidate	Votes	%	±%
Whig	Matthew White Ridley (1)	Unopposed	N/A	N/A
Tory	Charles Brandling	Unopposed	N/A	N/A

- Resignation of Brandling in December 1797

By-election 1798: Newcastle-upon-Tyne
Party	Candidate	Votes	%	±%
Tory	Charles Brandling	Unopposed	N/A	N/A
Tory hold		Swing	N/A	

=== Elections of the 1800s ===
General election 1802: Newcastle-upon-Tyne (2 seats)
Party	Candidate	Votes	%	±%
Whig	Matthew White Ridley (1)	Unopposed	N/A	N/A
Tory	Charles Brandling	Unopposed	N/A	N/A

General election 1806: Newcastle-upon-Tyne (2 seats)
Party	Candidate	Votes	%	±%
Whig	Matthew White Ridley (1)	Unopposed	N/A	N/A
Tory	Charles Brandling	Unopposed	N/A	N/A

General election 1807: Newcastle-upon-Tyne (2 seats)
Party	Candidate	Votes	%	±%
Whig	Matthew White Ridley (1)	Unopposed	N/A	N/A
Tory	Charles Brandling	Unopposed	N/A	N/A

=== Elections of the 1810s ===
General election 1812: Newcastle-upon-Tyne (2 seats)
Party	Candidate	Votes	%	±%
Whig	Matthew White Ridley (2)	Unopposed	N/A	N/A
Whig	Cuthbert Ellison	Unopposed	N/A	N/A

- Ridley succeeded as the 3rd Baronet, upon the death of his father (and predecessor as MP) in 1813

General election 1818: Newcastle-upon-Tyne (2 seats)
Party	Candidate	Votes	%	±%
Whig	Matthew White Ridley (2)	Unopposed	N/A	N/A
Whig	Cuthbert Ellison	Unopposed	N/A	N/A

General election 1818: Newcastle-upon-Tyne (2 seats)
Party	Candidate	Votes	%	±%
Whig	Matthew White Ridley (2)	Unopposed	N/A	N/A
Whig	Cuthbert Ellison	Unopposed	N/A	N/A

=== Elections of the 1820s ===
General election 1820: Newcastle-upon-Tyne (2 seats)
Party	Candidate	Votes	%	±%
Whig	Matthew White Ridley (2)	616	47.0	N/A
Whig	Cuthbert Ellison	477	36.4	N/A
Tory	John Scott	217	16.6	New
Majority		260	17.8	N/A
Turnout		1,310 (731 electors)	N/A	N/A
Whig hold		Swing		
Whig hold		Swing		

General election 1826: Newcastle-upon-Tyne (2 seats)
Party	Candidate	Votes	%	±%
Whig	Matthew White Ridley (2)	Unopposed	N/A	N/A
Whig	Cuthbert Ellison	Unopposed	N/A	N/A

=== Elections of the 1830s ===
General election 1830: Newcastle-upon-Tyne (2 seats)
Party	Candidate	Votes	%
Whig	Matthew White Ridley (2)	Unopposed	
Tory	John Hodgson	Unopposed	
Registered electors		c. 5,000	
Whig hold			
Tory gain from Whig			

General election 1831: Newcastle-upon-Tyne (2 seats)
Party	Candidate	Votes	%
Whig	Matthew White Ridley (2)	Unopposed	
Tory	John Hodgson	Unopposed	
Registered electors		c. 5,000	
Whig hold			
Tory hold			

General election 1832: Newcastle-upon-Tyne (2 seats)
Party	Candidate	Votes	%
Whig	Matthew White Ridley (2)	2,112	43.2
Tory	John Hodgson	1,686	34.5
Radical	Charles Attwood	1,092	22.3
Turnout		2,850	73.0
Registered electors		3,905	
Majority		426	8.7
Whig hold			
Majority		594	12.2
Tory hold			

General election 1835: Newcastle-upon-Tyne (2 seats)
Party	Candidate	Votes	%	±%
Whig	William Ord	1,843	33.0	+11.4
Whig	Matthew White Ridley (2)	1,499	26.8	+5.2
Conservative	John Hodgson	1,254	22.5	−12.0
Radical	James Aytoun	988	17.7	−4.6
Majority		245	4.3	−4.4
Turnout		3,107	76.6	+3.6
Registered electors		4,054		
Whig hold		Swing	+8.7	
Whig gain from Tory		Swing	+5.6	

Ridley's death caused a by-election.

By-election, 27 July 1836: Newcastle-upon-Tyne
Party	Candidate	Votes	%	±%
Conservative	John Hodgson	1,576	50.8	+28.3
Whig	Christopher Blackett	1,528	49.2	−10.6
Majority		48	1.6	N/A
Turnout		3,104	75.5	−1.1
Registered electors		4,110		
Conservative gain from Whig		Swing	+19.5	

General election 1837: Newcastle-upon-Tyne (2 seats)
Party	Candidate	Votes	%	±%
Whig	William Ord	1,792	29.4	−3.6
Conservative	John Hodgson-Hinde	1,701	27.9	+16.7
Whig	Charles John Bigge	1,187	19.5	−7.3
Conservative	John Blenkinsopp Coulson	1,127	18.5	+7.3
Chartist	Augustus Harding Beaumont	290	4.8	New
Turnout		3,173	69.2	−7.4
Registered electors		4,582		
Majority		91	1.5	−2.8
Whig hold		Swing	−6.0	
Majority		514	8.4	N/A
Conservative gain from Whig		Swing	+11.1	

=== Elections in the 1840s ===
General election 1841: Newcastle-upon-Tyne (2 seats)
Party	Candidate	Votes	%	±%
Conservative	John Hodgson-Hinde	Unopposed		
Whig	William Ord	Unopposed		
Registered electors		5,124		
Conservative hold				
Whig hold				

General election 1847: Newcastle-upon-Tyne (2 seats)
Party	Candidate	Votes	%	±%
Whig	William Ord	2,196	36.2	N/A
Whig	Thomas Emerson Headlam	2,068	34.1	N/A
Conservative	Richard Hodgson	1,680	27.7	N/A
Majority		388	6.4	N/A
Turnout		3,812 (est)	72.7 (est)	N/A
Registered electors		5,245		
Whig hold		Swing	N/A	
Whig gain from Conservative		Swing	N/A	

=== Elections in the 1850s ===
General election 1852: Newcastle-upon-Tyne (2 seats)
Party	Candidate	Votes	%	±%
Whig	John Blackett	2,418	37.9	N/A
Whig	Thomas Emerson Headlam	2,172	34.0	−0.1
Whig	William Henry Watson	1,795	28.1	N/A
Majority		377	5.9	+1.5
Turnout		3,193 (est)	60.6 (est)	−12.1
Registered electors		5,269		
Whig hold		Swing	N/A	
Whig hold		Swing	N/A	

Blackett resigned due to ill health, causing a by-election.

By-election, 5 February 1856: Newcastle-upon-Tyne (1 seat)
Party	Candidate	Votes	%	±%
Whig	George Ridley	Unopposed		
Whig hold				

General election 1857: Newcastle-upon-Tyne (2 seats)
Party	Candidate	Votes	%	±%
Whig	George Ridley	2,445	39.1	+1.2
Whig	Thomas Emerson Headlam	2,133	34.1	+0.1
Conservative	Peter Carstairs	1,673	26.8	New
Majority		460	7.3	+1.4
Turnout		3,962 (est)	66.5 (est)	+5.9
Registered electors		5,962		
Whig hold		Swing	N/A	
Whig hold		Swing	N/A	

General election 1859: Newcastle-upon-Tyne (2 seats)
Party	Candidate	Votes	%	±%
Liberal	Thomas Emerson Headlam	2,688	46.1	+12.0
Liberal	George Ridley	2,679	46.0	+6.9
Liberal	Peter Alfred Taylor	462	7.9	N/A
Majority		2,217	38.1	+30.8
Turnout		2,915 (est)	48.5 (est)	−18.0
Registered electors		6,008		
Liberal hold		Swing	N/A	
Liberal hold		Swing	N/A	

Headlam was appointed Judge-Advocate General of the Armed Forces, requiring a by-election.

By-election, 28 June 1859: Newcastle-upon-Tyne (1 seat)
Party	Candidate	Votes	%	±%
Liberal	Thomas Emerson Headlam	2,153	56.0	+9.9
Conservative	William Cuthbert	1,086	28.2	New
Majority		1,067	27.8	−10.3
Turnout		3,846	64.0	+15.5
Registered electors		6,008		
Liberal hold		Swing	N/A	

=== Elections in the 1860s ===
Ridley resigned after being appointed a Copyhold, Inclosure and Tithe Commissioner.

By-election, 7 December 1860: Newcastle-upon-Tyne (1 seat)
Party	Candidate	Votes	%	±%
Liberal	Somerset Beaumont	2,346	61.0	N/A
Independent Liberal	Peter Carstairs	1,500	39.0	New
Majority		846	22.0	−16.1
Turnout		3,846	70.2	+21.7
Registered electors		5,475		
Liberal hold		Swing	N/A	

General election 1865: Newcastle-upon-Tyne (2 seats)
Party	Candidate	Votes	%	±%
Liberal	Joseph Cowen	2,941	39.3	N/A
Liberal	Thomas Emerson Headlam	2,477	33.1	−13.0
Liberal	Somerset Beaumont	2,060	27.5	−18.5
Majority		417	5.6	−32.5
Turnout		3,739 (est)	56.4 (est)	+7.9
Registered electors		6,630		
Liberal hold		Swing	N/A	
Liberal hold		Swing	N/A	

General election 1868: Newcastle-upon-Tyne (2 seats)
Party	Candidate	Votes	%	±%
Liberal	Joseph Cowen	7,057	42.9	+3.6
Liberal	Thomas Emerson Headlam	6,674	40.6	+7.5
Conservative	Charles Frederick Hamond	2,725	16.6	New
Majority		3,949	24.0	+18.4
Turnout		9,591 (est)	51.7 (est)	−4.7
Registered electors		18,557		
Liberal hold		Swing	N/A	
Liberal hold		Swing	N/A	

=== Elections in the 1870s ===
Cowen's death caused a by-election, at which his son was elected.

By-election, 17 Jan 1874: Newcastle-upon-Tyne (1 seat)
Party	Candidate	Votes	%	±%
Liberal	Joseph Cowen	7,356	53.7	−29.8
Conservative	Charles Frederick Hamond	6,353	46.3	+29.7
Majority		1,003	7.4	−16.6
Turnout		13,709	64.0	+12.3
Registered electors		21,407		
Liberal hold		Swing	−29.8	

General election 1874: Newcastle-upon-Tyne (2 seats)
Party	Candidate	Votes	%	±%
Liberal	Joseph Cowen	8,464	40.8	−2.1
Conservative	Charles Frederick Hamond	6,479	31.2	+14.6
Liberal	Thomas Emerson Headlam	5,807	28.0	−12.6
Turnout		13,615 (est)	63.6 (est)	+11.9
Registered electors		21,407		
Majority		1,985	9.6	−14.4
Liberal hold		Swing	−4.7	
Majority		672	3.2	N/A
Conservative gain from Liberal		Swing	+14.7	

=== Elections in the 1880s ===
General election 1880: Newcastle-upon-Tyne (2 seats)
Party	Candidate	Votes	%	±%
Liberal	Joseph Cowen	11,766	42.9	+2.1
Liberal	Ashton Wentworth Dilke	10,404	37.9	+9.9
Conservative	Charles Frederick Hamond	5,271	19.2	−12.0
Majority		5,133	18.7	+9.1
Turnout		17,037 (est)	71.6 (est)	+8.0
Registered electors		23,800		
Liberal hold		Swing	+4.1	
Liberal gain from Conservative		Swing	+7.8	

Dilke's resignation caused a by-election.

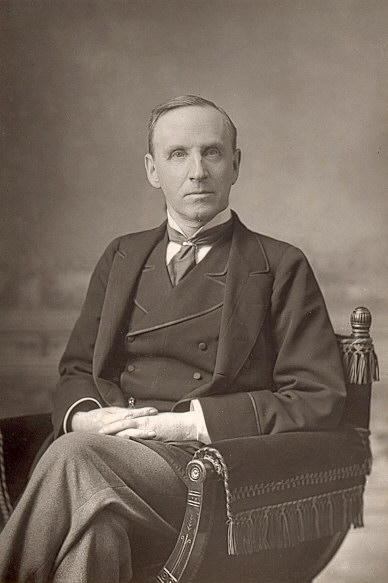
John Morley

By-election, 26 Feb 1883: Newcastle-upon-Tyne (1 seat)
Party	Candidate	Votes	%	±%
Liberal	John Morley	9,443	56.8	−24.0
Conservative	Gainsford Bruce	7,187	43.2	+24.0
Majority		2,256	13.6	−5.1
Turnout		16,630	62.1	−9.5 (est)
Registered electors		26,305		
Liberal hold		Swing	−24.0	

General election 1885: Newcastle-upon-Tyne (2 seats)
Party	Candidate	Votes	%	±%
Independent Liberal	Joseph Cowen	10,489	34.9	−8.0
Liberal	John Morley	10,129	33.6	−4.3
Conservative	Charles Frederick Hamond	9,500	31.5	+12.3
Turnout		30,478	73.0	+1.4 (est)
Registered electors		30,314		
Majority		989	3.4	N/A
Independent Liberal gain from Liberal		Swing	N/A	
Majority		629	2.1	−16.6
Liberal hold		Swing	−5.3	

- Cowen lost the support of the local Liberal Association during the campaign period, and Liberal supporters were urged to only vote for Morley.

Morley was appointed Chief Secretary to the Lord Lieutenant of Ireland, requiring a by-election.

1886 Newcastle-upon-Tyne by-election
Party	Candidate	Votes	%	±%
Liberal	John Morley	11,110	56.8	+23.2
Conservative	Charles Frederick Hamond	8,449	43.2	+12.7
Majority		2,661	13.6	+11.5
Turnout		19,559	64.5	−8.5
Registered electors		30,314		
Liberal hold		Swing	+5.8	

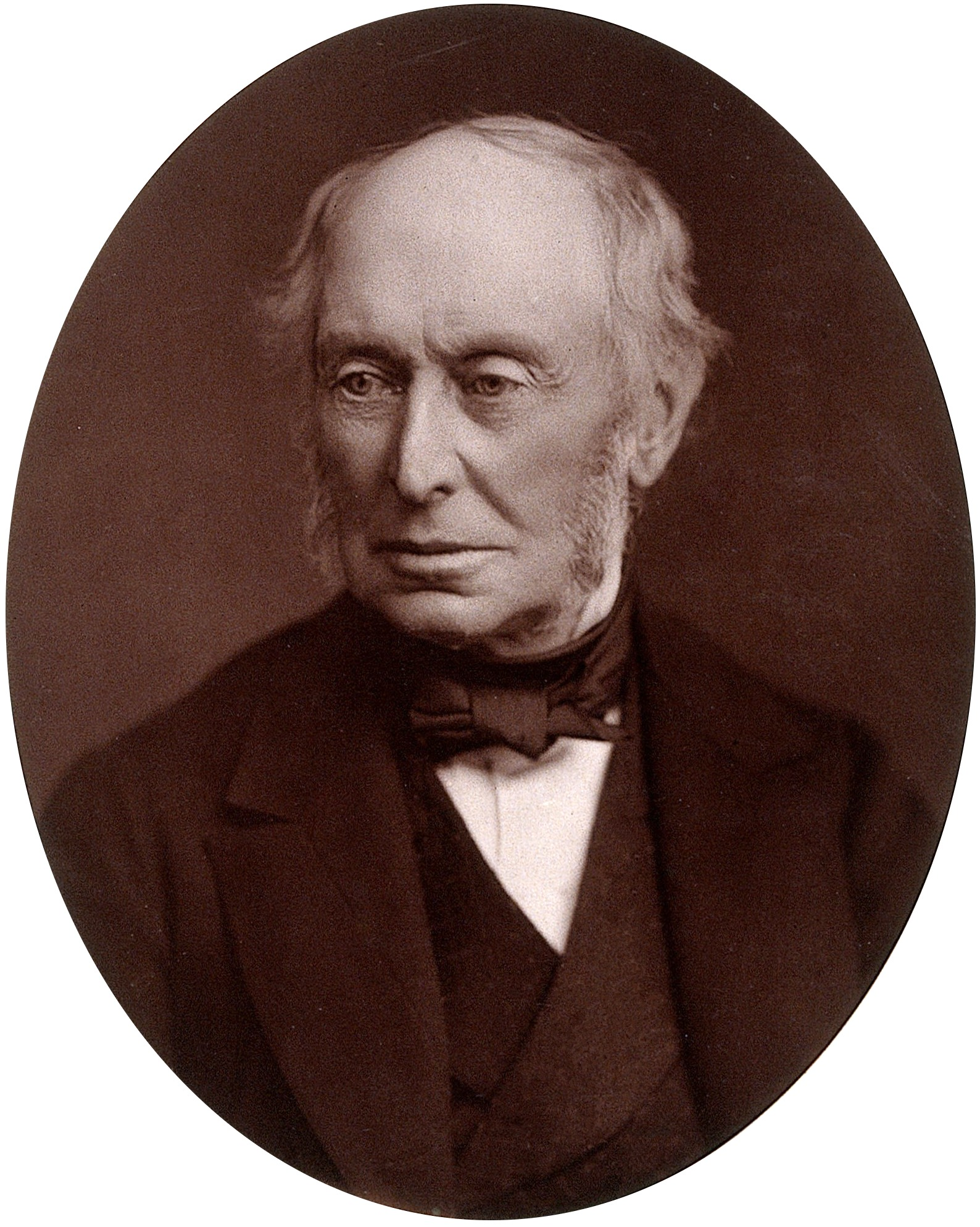
Armstrong

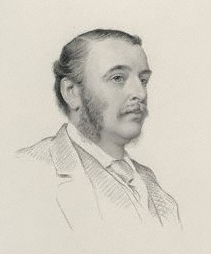
Ridley

General election 1886: Newcastle-upon-Tyne (2 seats)
Party	Candidate	Votes	%	±%
Liberal	John Morley	10,681	26.6	−7.0
Liberal	James Craig	10,172	25.4	N/A
Liberal Unionist	William Armstrong	9,657	24.1	New
Conservative	Matthew White Ridley	9,580	23.9	−7.6
Majority		515	1.3	−0.8
Turnout		40,090	67.3	−5.7
Registered electors		30,314		
Liberal hold		Swing	+0.3	
Liberal gain from Independent Liberal		Swing	N/A	

=== Elections in the 1890s ===
General election 1892: Newcastle-upon-Tyne (2 seats)
Party	Candidate	Votes	%	±%
Conservative	Charles Frederick Hamond	13,823	39.0	+15.1
Liberal	John Morley	10,905	30.8	+4.2
Liberal	James Craig	10,686	30.2	+4.8
Majority		3,137	8.8	N/A
Turnout		24,537 (est)	76.4	+9.1
Registered electors		32,117		
Conservative gain from Liberal		Swing	+5.5	
Liberal hold		Swing	−5.5	

Morley is appointed Chief Secretary to the Lord Lieutenant of Ireland, requiring a by-election.

1892 Newcastle-upon-Tyne by-election
Party	Candidate	Votes	%	±%
Liberal	John Morley	12,983	53.6	−7.4
Liberal Unionist	Pandeli Ralli	11,244	46.4	+7.4
Majority		1,739	7.2	−1.6
Turnout		24,227	75.4	−1.0
Registered electors		32,117		
Liberal hold		Swing	−7.4	

General election 1895: Newcastle-upon-Tyne (2 seats)
Party	Candidate	Votes	%	±%
Conservative	Charles Frederick Hamond	12,833	25.4	+5.9
Conservative	William Cruddas	12,170	24.2	+4.7
Liberal	John Morley	11,862	23.6	−7.2
Liberal	James Craig	11,154	22.2	−8.0
Ind. Labour Party	Fred Hammill	2,302	4.6	New
Majority		308	0.6	−8.2
Turnout		25,769 (est)	79.6	+3.2
Registered electors		32,373		
Conservative hold		Swing	+6.7	
Conservative gain from Liberal		Swing	+6.0	

=== Elections in the 1900s ===
General election 1900: Newcastle-upon-Tyne (2 seats)
Party	Candidate	Votes	%	±%
Conservative	Walter Richard Plummer	15,097	29.7	+4.3
Conservative	George Renwick	14,752	29.0	+4.8
Liberal	Samuel Storey	10,488	20.7	−2.9
Liberal	Hedworth Lambton	10,463	20.6	−1.6
Majority		4,264	8.3	+7.7
Turnout		50,800	74.1	−5.5
Registered electors		34,690		
Conservative hold		Swing	+3.6	
Conservative hold		Swing	+3.9	

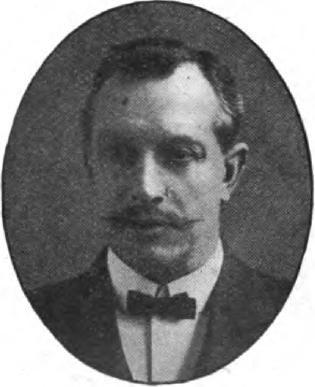
Walter Hudson

General election 1906: Newcastle-upon-Tyne (2 seats)
Party	Candidate	Votes	%	±%
Labour Repr. Cmte.	Walter Hudson	18,869	31.1	New
Liberal	Thomas Cairns	18,423	30.5	+9.8
Conservative	Walter Richard Plummer	11,942	19.8	−9.9
Conservative	George Renwick	11,223	18.6	−10.4
Turnout		60,457	84.6	+10.5
Registered electors		36,909		
Majority		6,927	11.3	N/A
Labour Repr. Cmte. gain from Conservative		Swing	N/A	
Majority		7,200	11.9	N/A
Liberal gain from Conservative		Swing	+9.9	

1908 Newcastle-upon-Tyne by-election
Party	Candidate	Votes	%	±%
Conservative	George Renwick	13,863	48.5	+7.1
Liberal	Edward Shortt	11,720	41.1	+10.6
Social Democratic Federation	Edward Hartley	2,971	10.4	New
Majority		2,143	7.4	N/A
Turnout		28,554	76.4	−8.2
Registered electors		37,389		
Conservative gain from Liberal		Swing	−1.8	

=== Elections in the 1910s ===
Edward Shortt

General election January 1910: Newcastle-upon-Tyne (2 seats)
Party	Candidate	Votes	%	±%
Liberal	Edward Shortt	18,779	28.9	−1.6
Labour	Walter Hudson	18,241	28.1	−3.0
Conservative	Walter Richard Plummer	14,067	21.6	+1.8
Conservative	George Renwick	13,928	21.4	+2.8
Turnout		65,015	86.1	+1.5
Registered electors		38,534		
Majority		4,712	7.3	−3.4
Liberal hold		Swing	−1.7	
Majority		4,174	6.5	−4.8
Labour hold		Swing	−2.9	

General election December 1910: Newcastle-upon-Tyne (2 seats)
Party	Candidate	Votes	%	±%
Liberal	Edward Shortt	16,599	28.1	−0.8
Labour	Walter Hudson	16,447	28.0	−0.1
Conservative	Edward Clark	12,915	22.0	+0.4
Conservative	Jasper Ridley	12,849	21.9	+0.5
Turnout		58,810	78.3	−7.8
Majority		3,684	6.1	−1.2
Liberal hold		Swing	−0.6	
Majority		3,598	6.1	−0.4
Labour hold		Swing	−0.3	

General Election 1914–15:

Another General Election was required to take place before the end of 1915. The political parties had been making preparations for an election to take place and by July 1914, the following candidates had been selected;

- Liberal: Edward Shortt
- Labour: Walter Hudson
- Unionist: Walter Richard Plummer, Nicholas Grattan-Doyle

1918 by-election: Newcastle-upon-Tyne
Party	Candidate	Votes	%	±%
National Liberal	Edward Shortt	Unopposed		
National Liberal hold				

== See also ==
- History of parliamentary constituencies and boundaries in Northumberland
