= William Cruddas =

William Donaldson Cruddas (1831 – 8 February 1912) JP MP was a British business director and politician. He married the daughter of William Nesham who was the honorary secretary to the Cathedral Nurse and Loan Society. From 1888 they owned and lived at Haughton Castle.

Born in Elswick, Cruddas became a director of the Elswick Works, and chairman of the Newcastle and Gateshead Water Company. He also became a justice of the peace. At the 1895 UK general election, he was elected for the Conservative Party in Newcastle-upon-Tyne, but he retired in 1900 after a long period of ill health and the death of his wife who had been nursing him. In 1903, he was appointed as High Sheriff of Northumberland.
