= Charles John Brandling =

British politician

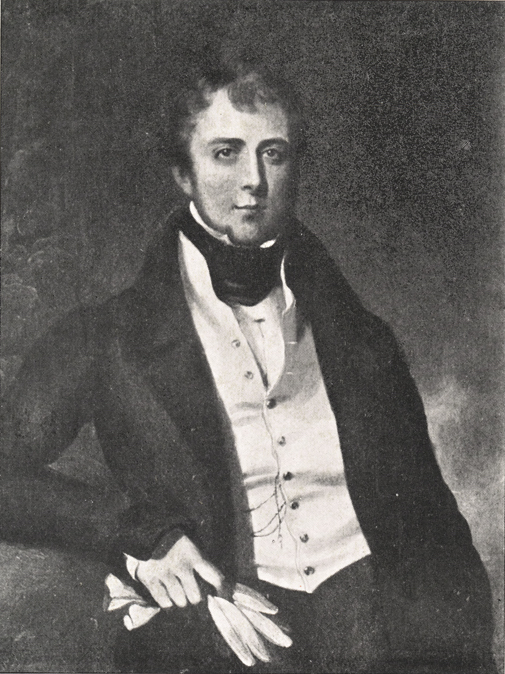
Charles John Brandling

Charles John Brandling (4 February 1769 – 1 February 1826) was an English MP and coal mine owner.

He was the son of Charles Brandling (1733–1802) of Gosforth House, near Newcastle-upon-Tyne. He succeeded his father as MP for Newcastle in 1798, holding the seat until 1812. From 1820 until his death he was the MP for Northumberland.

He became a lieutenant of the Northumberland militia in 1790, being promoted captain in 1793, and in 1819 he was made Lieutenant-Colonel of the Northumberland & Newcastle volunteer cavalry.

His father installed him at Middleton Lodge, about 4 miles south of Leeds, in 1802. The family had come into ownership of land here through marriage of Ralph Brandling, Charles John's great great uncle, to the Middleton heiress in 1697. Charles John commissioned a survey of the estate and its potential and appointed John Blenkinsop as his manager. This young mining engineer was responsible for making a success of the next era of the mining business by inventing a rack and pinion system for the wagonway (a horse-drawn route of the mid-18th century) and commissioning what turned out to be the first commercially successful steam locomotive, designed and built by Matthew Murray, to transport the coals into Leeds on The Middleton Railway.

He married Frances Elizabeth Hawksworth, daughter of Walter Fawkes (formerly Hawksworth) of Hawksworth, Yorks. His friend Earl Grey described him and his wife as "cordial in their manner, unaffected and extremely good-natured". They had no children.

In 1817 he chaired the committee which established the reward to be paid to George Stephenson for the invention of the Geordie lamp.

Parliament of the United Kingdom
Preceded by Charles Brandling	Member of Parliament for Newcastle-upon-Tyne; 1798–1812	Succeeded by Cuthbert Ellison
Preceded by Sir Charles Monck; Thomas Richard Beaumont	Member of Parliament for Northumberland; 1820 – 1826; With: Thomas Wentworth Beaumont	Succeeded by Matthew Bell; Hon. Henry Liddell
