= Bridget Prentice =

British politician

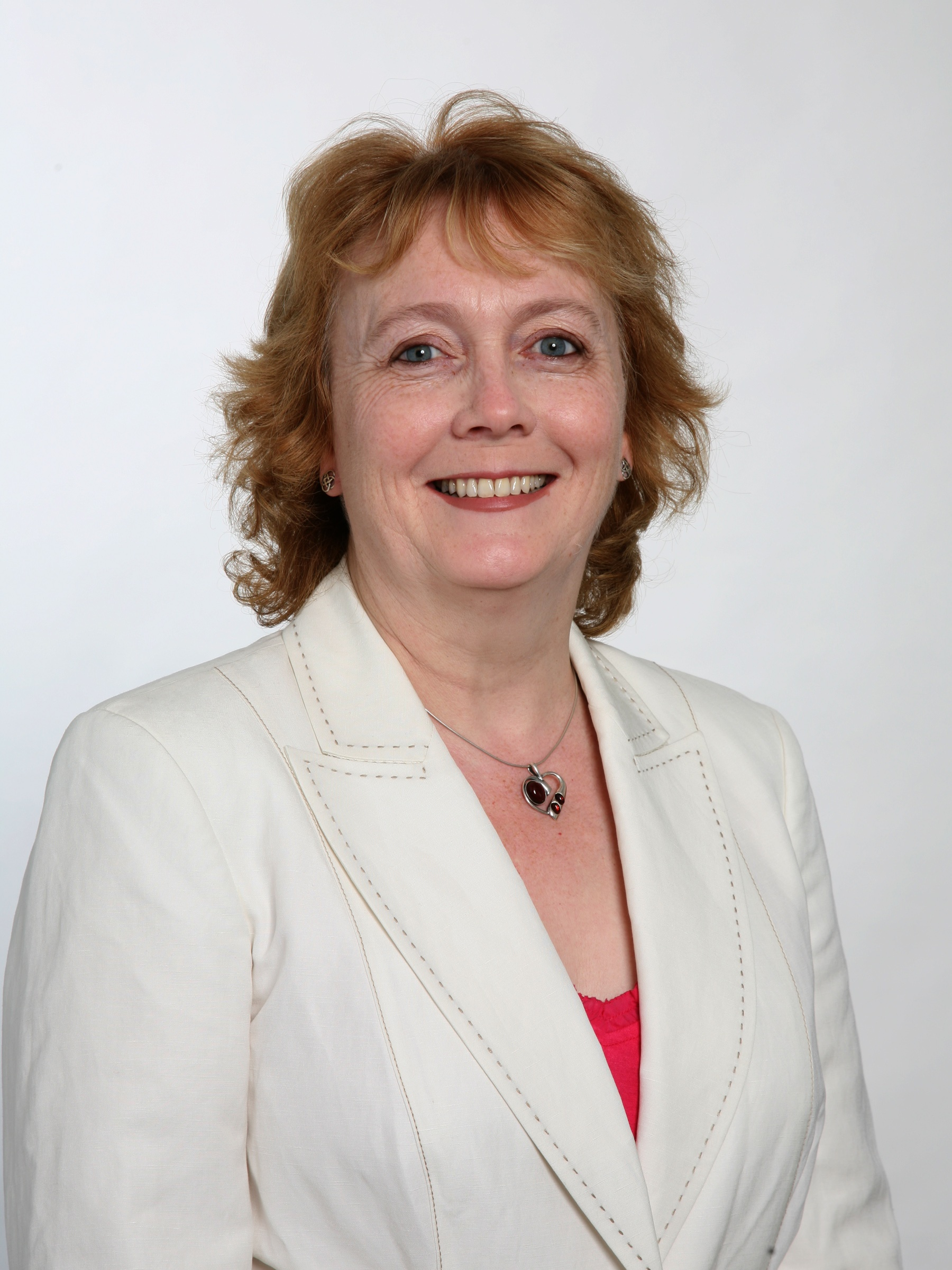

Member of the Electoral Commission for the Labour Party
- In office 1 April 2014 – 31 October 2018
- Nominated by: Ed Miliband
- Preceded by: Lord Kennedy of Southwark
- Succeeded by: Joan Walley

Parliamentary Under-Secretary of State for Justice
- In office 5 May 2005 – 11 May 2010
- Prime Minister: Tony Blair; Gordon Brown
- Preceded by: Chris Leslie
- Succeeded by: Jonathan Djanogly

Member of Parliament for Lewisham East
- In office 9 April 1992 – 12 April 2010
- Preceded by: Colin Moynihan
- Succeeded by: Heidi Alexander

Personal details
- Born: 28 December 1952 (age 73) Glasgow, Scotland
- Party: Labour (1974–2019)
- Spouse: Gordon Prentice (m. 1975; div. 2000)
- Education: University of Glasgow, University of London, South Bank Polytechnic
- Profession: Teacher
- Website: Bridget Prentice

Bridget Theresa Prentice (née Corr; born 28 December 1952) is a Scottish politician who was the Member of Parliament (MP) for Lewisham East from 1992 to 2010. She was married to the Labour MP Gordon Prentice from 1975 until their divorce in 2000. She was a member of the Labour Party until May 2019, when she resigned in protest at Jeremy Corbyn’s leadership.

== Background ==
Bridget Prentice was born in Glasgow, Scotland, on 28 December 1952. She attended Our Lady and St Francis School, the University of Glasgow (MA English Literature and Modern History 1973), the University of London (PGCE 1974) and South Bank Polytechnic (LLB 1992).

After beginning her working life as the Rector's Assistant at the University of Glasgow (1972–73), she became a history and English teacher at the Roman Catholic London Oratory School in Fulham (1974–86) and later Head of Careers (1984–86), before switching to John Archer School in Wandsworth as Head of Careers between 1986 and 1988.

== Member of Parliament ==
Prentice was an unsuccessful candidate in the 1987 general election, when she stood for Croydon Central. She contested Lewisham East at the 1992 election; its incumbent Conservative MP Colin Moynihan had a majority of 4,814. Prentice gained it for Labour with a majority of 1,095, joining her then husband Gordon Prentice in the House of Commons; and increased the majority to 12,127 in 1997. In subsequent general elections she held the seat with reduced majorities of 9,003 in 2001, and 6,751 in 2005.

Appointed a Labour Whip in 1995 by Tony Blair, she continued in the role on Labour entering government in May 1997, before becoming PPS to the Minister for Trade (1998–1999), and then PPS to the Lord Chancellor (1999–2001); she then left government in 2001 to become a member of the Home Affairs Select Committee (2001–2003).

Prentice rejoined the government in 2003, appointed again to the Government Whips' Office. She later became a Parliamentary Under-Secretary of State in the Department for Constitutional Affairs, continuing in the role in the department's successor, the Ministry of Justice.

Within the department, she was responsible for reform of electoral administration, legal services, legal services complaints, legal services commissioner and ombudsman, asylum and immigration, devolution and regional policy. In December 2008, she was reprimanded by the Parliamentary Commissioner for Standards John Lyon, for misusing her communications allowance. She agreed to pay back the money, which had been spent on sending party political literature to voters who were outside her constituency, but who would join it at the next election as the result of boundary changes.

In April 2009, Prentice announced her decision to stand down from Parliament at the following election. She has close ties to Bonus Pastor Secondary School in Lewisham, accepting one pupil every year for work experience, which included work within the constituency and the Houses of Parliament.

== Personal life ==
Although a Roman Catholic, Prentice has been a Governor at Trinity Church of England All Through School since 2010. In September 2013, she was elected chair of its governing body. She resigned from her membership of the Labour Party in May 2019.

Prentice was a participant in the 2022-23 series of the quiz show Only Connect, in the team "Jugadores".

Parliament of the United Kingdom
Preceded by Colin Moynihan	Member of Parliament for Lewisham East; 1992 – 2010	Succeeded by Heidi Alexander
