= Philip Mawer =

Sir Philip Mawer

Secretary General of the General Synod of the Church of England

Parliamentary Commissioner for Standards

Chairman of Professional Regulation Executive Committee of the Actuarial Profession

Personal details
- Born: Philip Mawer; 30 July 1947 (age 79) Kingston upon Hull, England
- Children: 3
- Education: Hull Grammar School; University of Edinburgh

Sir Philip John Courtney Mawer (born 30 July 1947) is a former Parliamentary Commissioner for Standards who was in the post from 2002 until 2008 when he became an independent advisor on Ministerial standards to Gordon Brown. He was previously Secretary General of the General Synod of the Church of England.

== Early life ==
Philip Mawer was born in Kingston upon Hull in 1947. He was educated at Hull Grammar School and the University of Edinburgh, where he was president of the Students Representative Council. After graduation he joined the Civil Service, rising to become Principal Private Secretary to Douglas Hurd. He supported Lord Scarman in his investigation of the 1981 Brixton riot. Scarman later described him as "a brilliant man in handling questions of principle."

== General Synod of the Church of England ==
In 1990, he was appointed as the Secretary General of the General Synod of the Church of England and of the Archbishop's Council. Among the major issues during his time in office was the decision to allow the ordination of women. He was awarded a knighthood in the 2002 Queen's Birthday Honours for his work at the Synod. From 2008 to 2013 Mawer sat on the board of Ecclesiastical Insurance, the insurance company founded by the Church of England. And since 2010 has been on the board of AllChurches Trust, the charitable owner of the insurer which maintains close links to the Church through its funding priorities of block grants to dioceses and cathedrals. In 2015 he was also President of Nobody's Friends, a private dining club in Lambeth Palace which was cited in the Peter Ball hearings at IICSA, the Independent Inquiry into Child Sexual Abuse.

== Parliamentary Commissioner for Standards ==
Mawer was appointed as Parliamentary Commissioner for Standards in February 2002. During his period in office he conducted a four year enquiry into the conduct of George Galloway which ultimately led to Galloway's suspension from the House of Commons for 18 days.

== Independent advisor on ministerial standards (2008-11) ==
In January 2008, Mawer was appointed as an "independent advisor" to Gordon Brown, investigating alleged breaches in the ministerial code of conduct. The advisor has to wait for a case to be referred to him by the prime minister before mounting an investigation.

In May 2009, he conducted an investigation into allegations by The Daily Telegraph that Justice Minister, Shahid Malik, had paid a rent below the market rate for his home and constituency office. Malik was cleared by Mawer's investigation and was reappointed to Gordon Brown's government in the June 2009 reshuffle, as a Parliamentary Under Secretary of State at the Department for Communities and Local Government.

After the 2010 election, he continued under David Cameron, although he is not known to have investigated any other ministers after the report into Malik. He left the post at the end of 2011 and was succeeded by Sir Alex Allan.

== Other roles ==
In summer 2009, Mawer was made Chairman of the Professional Regulation Executive Committee of the Actuarial Profession (later the Institute and Faculty of Actuaries (IFoA)) which he held until summer 2013. He was made an Honorary Fellow of the IFoA in 2014. In October 2014 it was announced he would serve as the Church of England's Independent Reviewer under the regulations enabling the ordination of women as bishops, serving from 17 November 2014 to the end of 2017. He was appointed as a Canon Provincial of York during the evensong service on 11 November 2015.

== Personal life ==
Mawer is married with three children. He plays the part of a dame in the amateur pantomime in his local village.
