= Daniel Greenberg =

Daniel or Dan Greenberg may refer to:

- Dan Greenberg (born 1965), American politician and Republican member of the Arkansas House of Representatives
- Daniel Greenberg (educator) (1934–2021), columnist and educator
- Daniel Greenberg (game designer), role-playing and video game designer
- Daniel S. Greenberg (1931–2020), American editor, author, and science journalist
- Daniel Greenberg (lawyer) (born 1965), British Parliamentary Commissioner for Standards
- Daniel Greenberg, Israeli model married to singer Eyal Golan

== See also ==
- Dan Greenburg (1936–2023), American author
