= Tim Yeo =

British politician

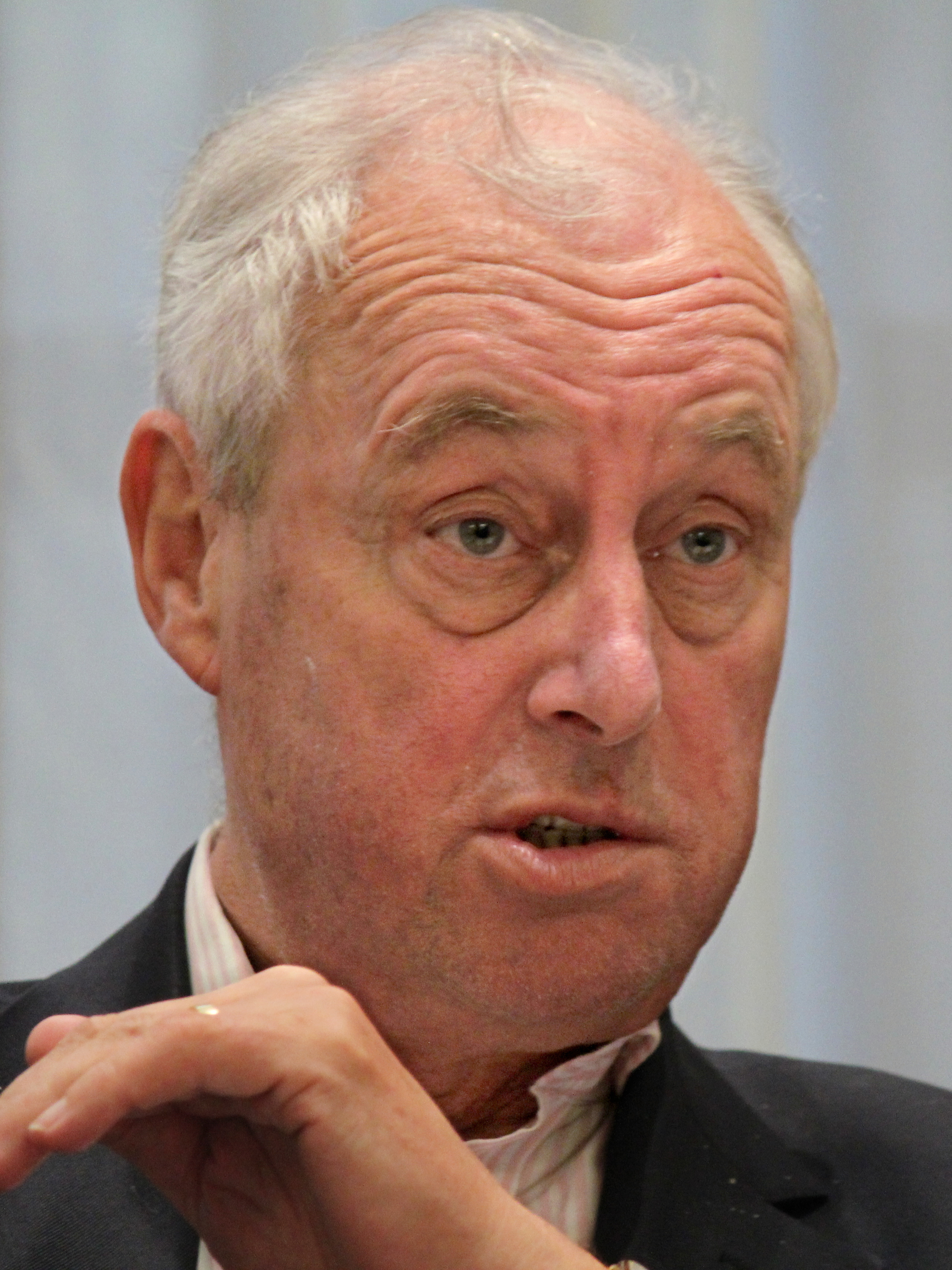
- Yeo in 2014

Chair of the Energy and Climate Change Select Committee
- In office 9 June 2010 – 30 March 2015 (Note: On leave of absence between 11 June 2013 and 26 November 2013, with Robert Smith serving as interim chair.)
- Preceded by: Elliot Morley
- Succeeded by: Angus MacNeil

Chair of the Environmental Audit Select Committee
- In office 15 December 2005 – 6 May 2010
- Preceded by: Peter Ainsworth
- Succeeded by: Joan Walley

Minister of State for the Environment
- In office 27 May 1993 – 6 January 1994
- Prime Minister: John Major
- Preceded by: David Trippier
- Succeeded by: Robert Atkins

Parliamentary Under-Secretary of State for Health and Social Security
- In office 15 April 1992 – 27 May 1993
- Prime Minister: John Major
- Preceded by: The Baroness Cumberlege
- Succeeded by: John Bowis

Parliamentary Under-Secretary of State for Housing
- In office 28 November 1990 – 15 April 1992
- Prime Minister: John Major

Member of Parliament for South Suffolk
- In office 9 June 1983 – 30 March 2015
- Preceded by: Constituency established
- Succeeded by: James Cartlidge

Shadow Cabinet portfolios
- 1998–2001: Agriculture, Fisheries and Food
- 2001–2002: Culture, Media and Sport
- 2002–2003: Trade and Industry
- 2003–2004: Public Services; Health; Education
- 2004–2005: Environment and Transport

Personal details
- Born: 20 March 1945 (age 81) London, England
- Party: Conservative
- Spouse: Diane Helen Pickard
- Children: 4, including Jonathan
- Education: Emmanuel College, Cambridge

Timothy Stephen Kenneth Yeo (born 20 March 1945) is a British politician. A member of the Conservative Party, he was the Member of Parliament (MP) for the constituency of South Suffolk between the 1983 United Kingdom general election and that of 2015, when he was deselected by his constituency party.

Yeo served as the Minister for the Environment and Countryside from 1993 to 1994 in the government of Prime Minister John Major. He also served in the Shadow Cabinet from 1998 to 2005 under Conservative Party leaders William Hague, Iain Duncan Smith and Michael Howard.

== Early life ==
Yeo was educated at Charterhouse School, before going on to Emmanuel College, Cambridge, where he read History and graduated in 1968. At university he "did no work, got a poor degree and adored it".

From 1970 to 1973, Yeo was assistant treasurer of Bankers Trust Company. Then, from 1975 to 1986, he was a director of Worcester Engineering Company. From 1980 to 1983, he was chief executive of the Spastics Society (now known as Scope).

The Tadworth Court Children's Hospital was founded in 1984 under his chairmanship after Great Ormond Street Hospital had decided to relinquish the building in 1982. He resigned in the early nineties because of his parliamentary workload and was succeeded by Archie Norman.

== Political career ==
Yeo contested Bedwellty in the February 1974 general election before being elected as MP for South Suffolk in 1983, replacing Sudbury & Woodbridge MP Keith Stainton who he defeated in the selection contest for South Suffolk.

He asked the first televised Prime Minister's Question to Margaret Thatcher on 28 November 1989.

=== In government ===
In 1988, he became the Parliamentary Private Secretary to the Home Secretary, Douglas Hurd and in 1990 was appointed Parliamentary Under Secretary for Housing and Planning. After the 1992 general election Yeo became Parliamentary Under Secretary for Health.

In 1993, Yeo was appointed Minister for the Environment and Countryside in John Major's government, but was forced to resign after a scandal involving his so-called "love child" with a Conservative councillor, Julia Stent, who was born on 8 July 1993. Three years earlier, Yeo had said to the branch of Relate in his constituency, "It is in everyone's interests to reduce broken families and the number of single parents. I have seen from my own constituency the consequences of marital breakdown." The story broke on Boxing Day during a quiet news period and intense coverage was given to the scandal. Yeo resigned on 5 January 1994; he was the first ministerial casualty of the media reaction to John Major's Back to Basics campaign.

=== In opposition ===
After the Conservatives' defeat in the 1997 general election, the party's new leader William Hague appointed Yeo as a spokesman on the Environment, Transport and the Regions. He was promoted to the Shadow Cabinet as Shadow Minister of Agriculture in 1998. In 2001, he played a leading role in exposing the Government's mishandling of the Foot and Mouth Disease epidemic.

Yeo was a member of Iain Duncan Smith's Shadow Cabinet as Shadow Secretary of State for Trade and Industry. In 2003, Yeo was made Shadow Secretary for Education and Health by the party's new leader, Michael Howard, with responsibility for the party's policy on both schools and hospitals. In 2004, Howard made Yeo the Shadow Secretary for the Environment and Transport.

Yeo resigned from the shadow cabinet shortly after the 2005 general election, saying he wished to be free to play a role in rethinking the Conservative Party's future. On 27 August, he ruled himself out of the ensuing party leadership election following Howard's resignation, announcing his backing for former Chancellor of the Exchequer Kenneth Clarke. The contest was won by the then-Shadow Secretary of State for Education and Skills, David Cameron.

=== Committee chair ===
As chair of the Energy and Climate Change Select Committee, Yeo was an influential voice on energy policy. Despite his committee releasing a report sceptical of hydraulic fracturing in the United Kingdom, Yeo revised his personal opinion and supported the use of the technique in the UK. In 2012, he announced that he supported the proposal for a third runway at Heathrow Airport, and that his long-held "environmental objections" to expansion were "disappearing". In 2013, he stated that the government reaching an agreement over nuclear power expansion was a "matter of great urgency", and warned that Britain could run out of energy if negotiations were not concluded quickly.

On 9 June 2013, The Sunday Times alleged, citing video evidence of a conversation with the MP, that he had helped "coach" a solar energy company executive for an appearance before his parliamentary committee; the parent company pays Yeo. The MP referred himself to the Parliamentary Commissioner for Standards, and said that he intended to fight the claims made against him. On 24 November 2015, he lost his libel action against the newspaper in the High Court, with judge Mr Justice Warby saying that the newspaper's reporting was "substantially true" and describing Yeo's evidence as "unreliable" and "untruthful", with one part being "unworthy of belief". The Daily Telegraph suggested this should also raise questions about Kathryn Hudson's performance as Standards Commissioner, as she had previously cleared Mr Yeo of breaching the rules on lobbying ministers for financial reward and of bringing the Commons into disrepute.

On 9 June 2013 he temporarily "stepped aside" as the chair of the committee. The Liberal Democrat Sir Robert Smith replaced him on an interim basis.

=== Deselection ===
Yeo was deselected for the 2015 general election in a secret ballot of South Suffolk Conservative Party members on 29 November 2013. He remained the MP for the constituency until the election in May 2015.

== Business interests ==
Previously he has been chairman of AFC Energy, Univent plc, TMO Renewables and Eco City Vehicles plc. TMO Renewables collapsed, leading Yeo to be sued by former stakeholders for misleading them in early 2018.

He and his wife Diane are sole directors of Locana Corporation (London) Ltd., Anacol Holdings Ltd. and General Securities Register Ltd. He is also a director of ITI Energy Ltd. He writes articles for Golf Weekly and Country Life magazines and, occasionally, the Financial Times.

Yeo occupies a seat on the board of Eurotunnel. In June 2013 The Sunday Times released a video in which Yeo claimed to have told a representative of GB Railfreight (a subsidiary of Eurotunnel) how to act in front of the Energy and Climate Change Select Committee, saying he was "able to tell him in advance what to say". Yeo had earlier excused himself from the committee, on the grounds that he might be "biased" if he questioned an employee of a company for which he himself worked, and rejected the claims.

== Political funding ==
Yeo received £67,290 in remunerations from corporate donors for work done for AFC Energy PLC, a developer of alkaline fuel cells focused on industrial application. From other corporate donors, he received £372,419 in other remunerations, from companies including TMO Renewables Limited, Groupe Eurotunnel SA, and Eco City Vehicles.

== Post-parliamentary career ==
Yeo is chairman of New Nuclear Watch Europe and chairs the University of Sheffield Industrial Advisory Board for the Energy 2050 initiative.

== Personal life ==
Yeo married Diane Helen Pickard on 30 March 1970 in Greenwich. They have a son, the portrait painter Jonathan Yeo, and a daughter.

Yeo has two more daughters from outside his marriage. He fathered his first daughter in 1967 when he was still a student at Cambridge University and put her up for adoption. Another daughter was born in 1993 through an extra-marital affair.

== Notes ==
Parliament of the United Kingdom
New constituency	Member of Parliament for South Suffolk; 1983–2015	Succeeded by James Cartlidge
Political offices
Preceded by Michael Jack	Shadow Minister of Agriculture, Fisheries and Food; 1998–2001	Succeeded by Peter Ainsworth as Shadow Secretary of State for Environment, Food and Rural Affairs
Preceded by Peter Ainsworth	Shadow Secretary of State for Culture, Media and Sport; 2001–2002	Succeeded by John Whittingdale
Preceded by John Whittingdale	Shadow Secretary of State for Trade and Industry; 2002–2003	Succeeded by James Arbuthnot as Shadow Secretary of State for Trade
Preceded by John Whittingdale	Shadow Secretary of State for Trade and Industry; 2002–2003	Succeeded by Stephen O'Brien as Shadow Secretary of State for Industry
New office	Shadow Secretary of State for Public Services, Health and Education; 2003–2004	Position abolished
Preceded by Theresa May	Shadow Secretary of State for Environment and Transport; 2004–2005	Position abolished
