= Parliamentary Under-Secretary of State for Sentencing, Human Rights and Technology =

Junior ministerial office of the Government of the United Kingdom

- Royal Arms of His Majesty's Government

- Incumbent; Jake Richards since 7 September 2025
- Ministry of Justice
- Style: Minister
- Nominator: Prime Minister of the United Kingdom
- Appointer: The Monarch; on advice of the prime minister
- Formation: November 2023
- First holder: Gareth Bacon
- Website: https://www.gov.uk/government/ministers/parliamentary-under-secretary-of-state--279

The Parliamentary Under-Secretary of State for Sentencing, Human Rights and Technology (also known as Minister for Sentencing, Human Rights and Technology) is a junior role in His Majesty's Government in the Ministry of Justice it has been held by Jake Richards since 7 September 2026.

== Officeholders ==
Name	Portrait	Term of office		Political party	P.M.	Lord Chancellor
Parliamentary Under-Secretary of State for Criminal Justice Policy
Christopher Leslie		13 June 2003	5 May 2005	Labour	Tony Blair	Lord Falconer of Thoroton
Parliamentary Under-Secretary of State for Legal Services
Bridget Prentice		10 May 2005	8 May 2007	Labour	Labour	Lord Falconer of Thoroton
Parliamentary Under-Secretary of State for Civil and Family Justice
Bridget Prentice		9 May 2007	6 May 2010	Labour	Tony Blair	Lord Falconer of Thoroton
Bridget Prentice		9 May 2007	6 May 2010	Labour	Gordon Brown	Jack Straw
Parliamentary Under-Secretary of State for Justice
Shahid Malik		4 October 2008	15 May 2009	Labour	Gordon Brown	Jack Straw
Crispin Blunt		17 May 2010	4 September 2012	Conservative	David Cameron	Kenneth Clarke
Jeremy Wright		6 September 2012	15 July 2014	Conservative	David Cameron	Chris Grayling
Minister of State for Policing, Criminal Justice and Victims
Mike Penning		15 July 2014	16 July 2016	Conservative	David Cameron	Chris Grayling; Michael Gove
Parliamentary Under Secretary of State for Prisons and Probation
Sam Gyimah		17 July 2016	9 January 2018	Conservative	Theresa May	David Lidington
Parliamentary Under-Secretary of State for Justice
Edward Argar		14 June 2018	10 September 2019	Conservative	Theresa May	David Gauke
Edward Argar		14 June 2018	10 September 2019	Conservative	Boris Johnson	Robert Buckland
Chris Philp		10 September 2019	13 February 2020	Conservative	Boris Johnson	Robert Buckland
James Cartlidge		17 September 2021	7 July 2022	Conservative	Boris Johnson	Dominic Raab
Parliamentary Under Secretary of State for Justice and the Home Office
Sarah Dines		8 July 2022	20 September 2022	Conservative	Boris Johnson	Dominic Raab
Minister of State for Victims and Vulnerability
Rachel Maclean		7 September 2022	28 October 2022	Conservative	Liz Truss	Brandon Lewis
Minister of State for Victims and Sentencing
Edward Argar		27 October 2022	13 November 2023	Conservative	Rishi Sunak	Dominic Raab; Alex Chalk
Parliamentary Under-Secretary of State for Sentencing
Gareth Bacon		13 November 2023	5 July 2024	Conservative	Rishi Sunak	Alex Chalk
Nic Dakin		9 July 2024	7 September 2025	Labour	Keir Starmer	Shabana Mahmood
Parliamentary Under-Secretary of State for Sentencing, Youth Justice and International Justice (until July 2026) Parliamentary Under-Secretary of State for Sentencing, Human Rights and Technology (from July 2026)
Jake Richards		7 September 2025	Incumbent	Labour	Keir Starmer; Andy Burnham	David Lammy; Alex Norris

== Responsibilities ==
The minister has responsibility of the following policy areas:

- Sentencing Policy (including
- Sentencing Act Implementation)
- Youth Justice policy
- Youth Custody operations
- Men and Boys
- Irregular Migration (incl. Immigration Tribunal)
- Human Rights and ECHR
- Foreign National Offenders
- Prisoner Transfer Agreements
- Children of Prisoners
- Family Justice
- Mental Capacity
- Office for the Public Guardian administration
- Crown Dependencies and Overseas Territories
- Artificial Intelligence, cyber and tech
- Cross-cutting corporate portfolio (including sustainability)
- Transparency and FOI
- SI Minister
