= Filkin =

Filkin may refer to:

- Elizabeth Filkin (born 1940), British civil servant, Parliamentary Commissioner for Standards 1999–2002
- Geoffrey Filkin, Baron Filkin (born 1944), British Labour Party politician, former government minister

== See also ==
- Filkins, a village in Oxfordshire
