= Lycetts =

Insurance Broker and Financial Services

- Industry: Insurance & Financial Services
- Founded: 1961
- Founder: Major Michael Lycett CBE
- Headquarters: Bank House, Pilgrim Street, NE1 6QF, Newcastle upon Tyne, England
- Areas served: Ayr, Berwick St Leonard, Edinburgh, Exeter, London, Ludlow, Marlborough, Newcastle, Newmarket, Norfolk, Northamptonshire, Oxford, Shropshire, Surrey, Sussex, Yorkshire
- Key people: Mark Hews (Chairman); Ian Barclay (CEO)
- Products: Farm & Estate Insurance; Equine Insurance; Commercial Insurance; Household Insurance; Financial Services; Risk Management
- Owner: Benefact Group
- Parent: Benefact Trust
- Subsidiaries: Cliverton
- Website: lycetts.co.uk

Lycetts, headquartered in Newcastle upon Tyne, England, is an insurance broker and financial services company which specialises in farming, rural estate and equine insurance, as well as bespoke financial services, household, commercial and bloodstock insurance and risk management advice. Lycetts is part of the Benefact Group (previously Ecclesiastical Insurance), a family of specialist financial services which gives all of its available profits to charity and good causes.

A leading equine insurer, Lycetts sponsors several races and horse trial events.
