= Shahid Malik =

British politician (born 1967)

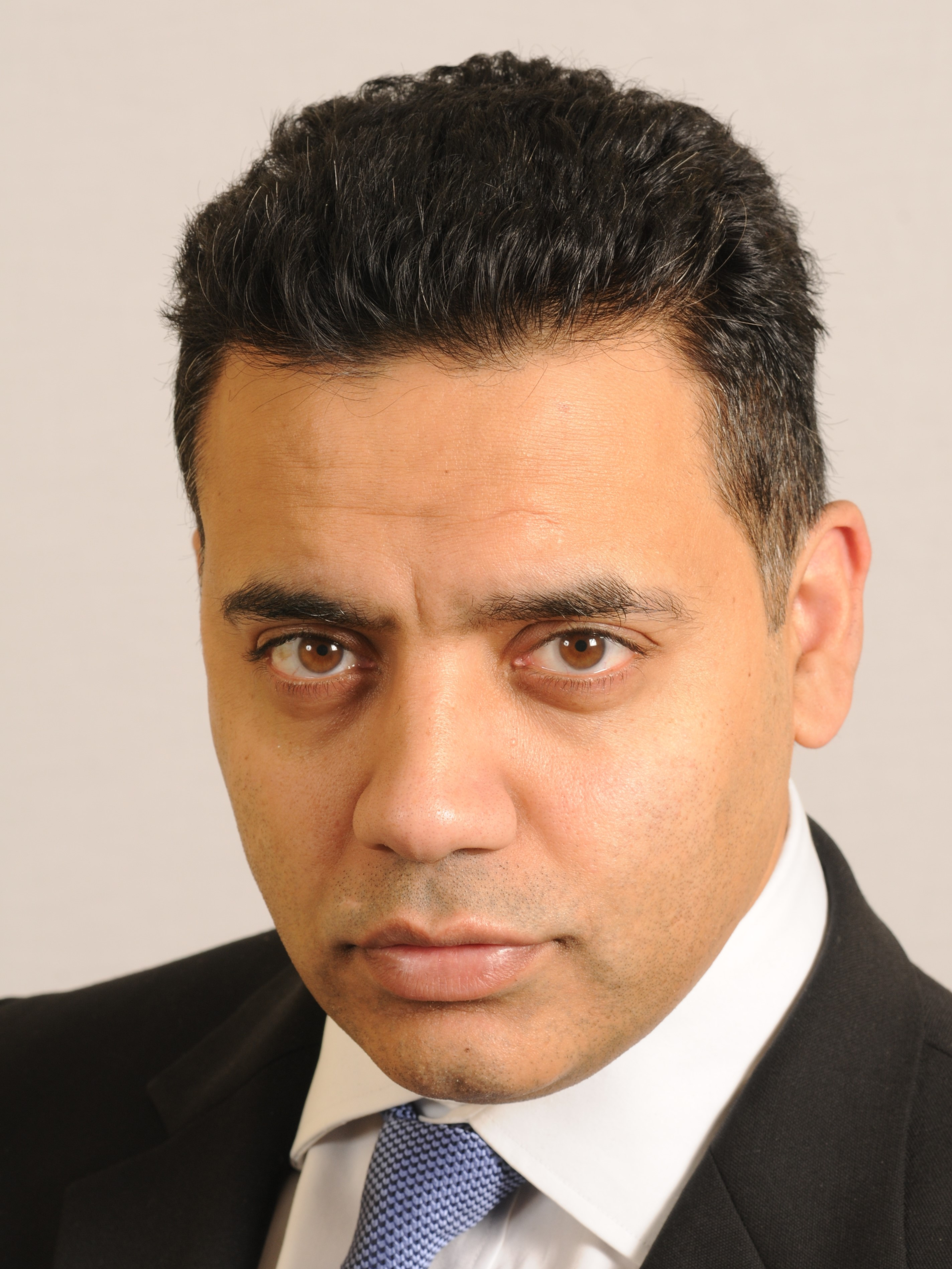
- Official portrait, 2008

Parliamentary Under-Secretary of State for Communities and Local Government
- In office 9 June 2009 – 11 May 2010
- Prime Minister: Gordon Brown
- Preceded by: Sadiq Khan
- Succeeded by: Andrew Stunell

Parliamentary Under-Secretary of State for Justice
- In office 4 October 2008 – 15 May 2009
- Prime Minister: Gordon Brown
- Preceded by: Maria Eagle
- Succeeded by: Claire Ward

Parliamentary Under-Secretary of State for International Development
- In office 27 June 2007 – 4 October 2008
- Prime Minister: Gordon Brown
- Preceded by: Gareth Thomas
- Succeeded by: Michael Foster

Member of Parliament for Dewsbury
- In office 5 May 2005 – 12 April 2010
- Preceded by: Ann Taylor
- Succeeded by: Simon Reevell

Personal details
- Born: Shahid Rafique Malik; 24 November 1967 (age 58) Burnley, Lancashire, England
- Party: Labour
- Education: Barden High School; Burnley Sixth Form Centre
- Alma mater: Durham University (BA)
- Occupation: Politician; media executive

Shahid Rafique Malik (Urdu: شاہد رفیق ملک نے; born 24 November 1967) is a British media executive and former politician. A member of the Labour Party, he was Member of Parliament (MP) for Dewsbury from 2005 to 2010.

The son of the mayor of Burnley, Malik studied business at Durham University. Prior to his election to parliament, Malik worked in the urban development, communities and education sectors. Elected at the 2005 general election, Malik and Sadiq Khan were the first British-born Muslims to be elected to parliament. (Note: Chaudhry Mohammad Sarwar became the first Muslim elected to parliament at the 1997 general election but was born in Pakistan.)

In 2007, Malik became Britain's first Muslim government minister. Initially responsible for the Department for International Development from 2007 to 2008, he subsequently served at the Ministry of Justice from 2008 to 2009 and Department for Communities and Local Government from 2009 to 2010. In his last ministerial role, he led the British government's efforts in fighting extremism; overseeing race, faith, and community cohesion; developing the Thames Gateway; and managing the Fire and Rescue Service. He lost his seat at the 2010 general election.

== Early life and education ==
Malik was born in Burnley, Lancashire, in 1967. His father Rafique Malik was a district councillor between 1976 and 2006 and a mayor of Burnley, having emigrated from Pakistan in the 1960s. Malik is one of seven siblings.

He attended Barden High School and Burnley Sixth Form Centre before studying Business Studies at the South Bank Polytechnic in London but formally graduated from Durham University.

== Pre-parliamentary career ==
After graduating, Malik initially worked with the East Lancashire Training and Enterprise Council in a business development capacity and later was chief executive of the Pakistan Muslim Centre in Sheffield and the Haringey Regeneration Agency. He was national chair of the voluntary sector body Urban Forum from 1999 to 2002. He was a commissioner for racial equality from 1998 to 2002 and an equality commissioner for Northern Ireland from 1999 to 2002. He also was an independent governor of Sheffield Hallam University from 1995 to 2001 and as vice-chair of the United Nations body, UNESCO UK, from 2000 to 2003.

In 2000, Malik was elected as the first non-white member of the National Executive Committee of the Labour Party. He was re-elected each year until 2005 when he stood down after being elected as an MP. Malik sought selection in several seats including Leeds Central and Tottenham. In 2002 he had hoped to be selected in his home town of Burnley where Peter Pike had indicated he was standing down. However, the National Executive Committee decided that the Constituency Labour Party should have an all-women shortlist. He then stood for selection in Brent East after Labour lost the 2003 by-election but was left off the shortlist despite having gained the most nominations in the selection process.

In June 2001, Malik was arrested and allegedly beaten by police during racially motivated riots in Burnley. He said he had been trying to stop the violence and told the BBC he had been arrested by "very hyped-up" police. "The riot shields were smashed in my face, causing four to five stitches above the eye, a black eye, lacerations to the arm, bruises on the back of the head, on the body and on the legs." On leaving Burnley General Hospital Malik said: "No recriminations. This incident should not stereotype all police officers". No charges were brought by Lancashire Police and Malik was offered an apology. In April 2003, Malik won a public apology and "substantial" libel damages after being wrongly accused of throwing bricks during the riots in the Lancashire Evening Telegraph on 17 January 2002. Malik's lawyer told the High Court in London: "At the time referred to in the article, he was acting as a mediator and peacemaker in a volatile situation following disturbances in Burnley."

== Parliamentary career ==
=== 2005 general election ===
In 2004 Malik was selected as the Labour candidate in Dewsbury for the 2005 general election. Labour saw a 6% drop in its vote nationally in 2005, and despite a 4.2% swing to the Conservatives in Dewsbury, Malik comfortably retained the seat for Labour with a majority of 4,615 ahead of Sayeeda Warsi. Upon his election, Malik was one of the first British-born Muslims to become an MP.

At the 2005 House Magazine Awards, he was awarded the best Maiden Speech among the one hundred plus new MPs elected in 2005. In February 2006, he was runner-up in the Channel Four News awards in the 'Rising Star' category. Upon election, Malik was appointed to the Home Affairs Select Committee. He also served on the Environmental Audit Select Committee until the cabinet reshuffle of May 2006 when he was appointed as the Parliamentary Private Secretary to the then Minister of State for Schools Jim Knight. He was an international monitor for the Palestinian Presidential elections in 2005 and Parliamentary elections in January 2006.

=== Race and community cohesion issues ===
Soon after his election to the House of Commons in 2005, Malik became one of the public faces of Muslim leadership in the UK and a leading voice in the battle with Islamic extremism in Britain. In the government reshuffle of 9 June 2009, Malik was given ministerial responsibility for issues of race, faith and community cohesion. In 2008, he was made an honorary Doctor of the University of Bradford for his contributions as Member of Parliament and, in particular, in recognition of the distinctive role he has played in working towards community cohesion and in striving for racial harmony.

=== Terrorism and extremism ===
Just two months after Malik was elected to the House of Commons, it was revealed that the leader of the 7 July 2005 London bombings, Mohammad Sidique Khan, came from his Dewsbury constituency. Malik described the bombings as "the most profound challenge yet faced by the British Muslim community". He said: "Condemnation is not enough and British Muslims must, and I believe are prepared to, confront the voices of evil head on."

Later Malik confronted the issue in an article for The Times newspaper. He wrote: "Yes, foreign policy causes anger among many British Muslims but this does not in itself cause terrorism. Unquestionably, the lethal ingredient is a twisted, perverted interpretation of Islam whereby you can legitimately kill yourself and other innocent people, and you will go to Heaven." He concluded that: "For British Muslims the fight against extremism is not just for the very soul of Islam but for the freedoms we enjoy as Britons."

Malik found controversy in February 2007 when he wrote, again in The Times, that the Muslim Council of Britain should "stop whingeing and show leadership." Referring to their decision not to play a part in Holocaust Memorial Day, Malik wrote: "Its flawed moral leadership places the MCB alongside the likes of the BNP leader, Nick Griffin, as nonattendees."

=== Muslim veil row ===
In October 2006 Malik garnered national attention when he spoke out in support of the decision to suspend, and later sack, a Muslim teaching assistant from Dewsbury for refusing to remove her veil in the classroom. Aishah Azmi, 24, was asked to remove her niqab veil after pupils found it hard to understand her during English language lessons. The school said she could wear the veil outside the classroom. Malik said: "In schools the top priority has got to be the education of our children... I believe the education authority has bent over backwards to be accommodating and has been extremely reasonable and sensible in the decision it has come to.” "There is no religious obligation whatsoever for Muslim women to cover themselves up in front of primary school children."

In June 2009 Malik spoke out against comments made by Nicolas Sarkozy after the French President declared the burqa was "not welcome" in France. Sarkozy said: "The burqa is not a sign of religion, it is a sign of subservience." Malik responded publicly by saying: "It is not the job of government to dictate what people should or should not wear in our society – that is a matter of personal choice."

"There are no laws stating what clothes or attire are acceptable and so whether one chooses to wear a veil or burqa, a miniskirt or goth outfit is entirely at the individual's discretion."

=== Parliamentary cleaners' rights ===
Malik placed an early day motion (EDM 434, 2005), which attracted 178 MPs signatures and led to the first picket and strike in the Houses of Parliament and eventually to improved pay and conditions for the cleaners of Parliament. EDM 434 stated: That this House values the cleaners who maintain high standards of service to Parliament; believes the parliamentary cleaners should be treated with respect and that it is wrong that, despite the widespread concern over their pay and conditions of employment, their pay has only increased from the national minimum wage of £4.85 per hour to £5 per hour; is concerned that the parliamentary cleaners only enjoy 12 days' paid holiday and have no company sick pay or pension; believes the time has come to end this sorry state of affairs; and urges the parliamentary authorities to reach agreement with the two contractors on making available the necessary resources to ensure that cleaners earn the London living wage.

=== 2010 general election ===
At the 2010 general election Malik lost his seat in the House of Commons to Simon Reevell of the Conservative Party. There had been significant boundary changes in his constituency which he felt had counted against him. Malik commented that the changes "brought in 26,000 extra Tories" from rural areas, including Denby Dale and Kirkburton. In his speech on election night, Malik also accused the independent candidate, Khizar Iqbal, of being "brought forward not to win but to make sure that I lost". Iqbal had been supported by anti-sleaze campaigner Martin Bell.

== Ministerial career (2007–2010) ==
=== International Development minister ===
Malik's first and longest ministerial role was as International Development minister where his roles included: conflict, humanitarian affairs and security; globally development programmes apart from Sub-Saharan Africa; UK civil society; Asian and Inter-American Development Banks; Caribbean Development Bank; Asia, MENA, South America and Europe development; and aid effectiveness. Malik was responsible for the UK's largest global aid programmes including in India, Afghanistan, Pakistan and Bangladesh as well as the Middle East and North Africa, the rest of Asia, South America and Europe. He was also the UK's Aid Effectiveness Minister working to ensure that the impact of aid was maximised, and gave evidence to the Parliament's International Development Committee on the issue.

In his role as the UK Minister responsible for Humanitarian Affairs, Conflict and Security Operations he had responsibility for overseeing the response to humanitarian emergencies both natural and man-made. For example, it covered disasters such as Cyclone Sidr in Bangladesh Cyclone Nargis in Burma; and the Pakistan earthquake, as well as man-made challenges, which meant supporting the work in Afghanistan, Iraq as well as for example UNRWA, UNDP, UNICEF, WHO etc.

Some of the individual initiative's in countries were in partnership with other countries and were relatively sizeable for example he signed a £90m maternal and new born health programme in Pakistan which was designed to save the lives of an estimated 30,000 women and some 350,000 children.

Malik was involved in the transition of Nepal out of civil war into an inclusive democracy. In this role he acted as an honest broker engaging with the Maoists leader Chairman Prachanda and the seven party alliance including PM Koirala. Other troubled areas that Malik engaged with included Darfur. In addition, Malik's focused his efforts on the Far East with visits and support to Vietnam and Indonesia.

He signed the UK's first ten-year partnership agreement in the Middle East with the government of Yemen. He also served as an observer to both Palestinian Parliamentary and Presidential elections.

In terms of UK civil society he was responsible for the distribution of £120 million per year to small NGOs as well as large ones such as the CAFOD, Red Cross, Oxfam, Action Aid, Christian Aid and Islamic Relief etc. He launched the UK's Youth volunteering schemes and others that linked the UK with the developing world and co-chaired the DFID/Trade Union Congress International Development Forum.

=== Communities and Local Government minister ===
As Communities and Local Government minister, Malik's role included covering: preventing extremism; community cohesion and faith; race migration; the Thames Gateway; Olympics legacy; and Fire and Rescue Services.

Malik was responsible for ensuring the £9 billion Olympic legacy investment had a beneficial impact on the regeneration of East London for the next twenty years. He also oversaw work with major businesses such as Land Securities PLC and helped initiate the dredging of the Dubai Ports World's £1.8 billion UK investment. He dealt with local authorities and private sector organisations to develop the Thames Gateway project and was responsible for the appointments of board members on the Olympic Park Legacy Company. He also chaired the Thames Gateway Strategic Partnership which was made up of the council leaders, CEOs and other agencies involved in the project.

Malik founded an award which was to be presented by the Prime Minister of the day known as the Heroes of the Holocaust award. The award was given (sometimes posthumously) to British non-Jews who had risked their lives or given their lives to save Jews and other persecuted groups from the Nazis. Gordon Brown was the first Prime Minister to present the Award which consists of a silver medallion inscribed with the words "In the Service of Humanity".

=== Libel claim ===
On 6 October 2006 Malik launched a libel case against both The Dewsbury Press editor Danny Lockwood and former Conservative councillor Jonathan Scott over a letter by Mr Scott criticising Labour's tactics following Scott's defeat at the Kirklees council elections in May 2006. Malik believing the material amounted to an accusation of racism. The defending newspaper suggested the case was attack on freedom of speech and a petition was presented to the Prime Minister protesting against Malik's legal action. The petition was dismissed.

In a trial at the High Court, despite the country's most senior Libel Judge, Lord Justice Eady, ruling in favour of Mr Malik giving him victory on three of the four defences that the Press newspaper, Lockwood and Scott had put forward against Mr Malik's defamation claim, the case ended in a mistrial due to the jury's inability to arrive at a majority of at least 10 out of 12 on the fourth defence. A retrial was averted after an agreed statement was published vindicating Malik. In the statement, Scott stated "I am happy to make clear that my letter was never intended to accuse Malik of orchestrating gangs of thugs or playing the race card. This was an interpretation some people placed upon my letter and subsequent article, an interpretation with which I disagreed". Lockwood said, "We want to make it clear that we never accused Shahid of any impropriety whatsoever during the elections". Malik said, "I am very pleased that after a discussion with Danny Lockwood, he has been able to give me the assurances I required".

=== Problems at US airports ===
On 25 October 2007, while on Government business, Malik was stopped and searched by United States airport security staff at Dulles Airport in Washington D.C. Malik said of the incident: "The abusive attitude I endured last November I forgot about and I forgave, but I really do believe that British ministers and parliamentarians should be afforded the same respect and dignity at USA airports that we would bestow upon our colleagues in the Senate and Congress. Obviously, there was no malice involved but it has to be said that the USA system does not inspire confidence."

=== BBC Gaza War Appeal ===
Malik criticised the BBC's decision not to broadcast an appeal by the Disaster and Emergencies Committee to help raise millions of pounds for people in need of food, medicines and shelter following Israel's three-week assault on the Palestinian territory. Malik warned that the Corporation's decision would be seen around the world as 'one which inflicts still further misery on the beleaguered and suffering people of Gaza'.

=== Tackling extremism ===
Malik said the £45million-a-year "Prevent" strategy would work in deprived white areas rather than concentrating on Muslim youths. Former Government adviser Paul Richards criticised the move, saying: "There is a real danger that if ministers relax the focus on Muslim youth, then it dilutes efforts to tackle terrorism". Former Shadow Home Secretary David Davis accused Malik of having "watered down the policy". Malik said Prevent, which includes measures like helping mosques to spot the early signs of extremism in vulnerable youngsters, was too focused on the Muslim community. He added: "You speak to any Muslim on the street anywhere in this country and they will say they are as opposed as you and I are to extremism, to terrorism ... But the frustration is that they are constantly linked with terrorism as a community as a whole". He went on: "It is not just about the Muslim, it is actually about everybody in our society having a role to play and we cannot dismiss or underestimate the threat from the far right".

=== MPs' expenses ===
Malik claimed £185,421 in parliamentary expenses for 2006, the highest amount claimed by any MP. Some £163,000 of this was used for staff and office etc. while the rest some £22,110 was claimed for personal use as part of his 'staying away from main house' allowance (ACA). 183 other MPs claimed exactly the same amount and in 2007/08 he again claimed the maximum personal ACA allowance as did 142 other MPs. Following Thomas Legg's audit of MPs expenses spending limits on eligible items were retrospectively lowered thus meaning that 468 MPs being were forced to make repayments. Malik repaid £1,300. The investigation further ordered that Malik apologise in writing to the House "for breaching the rules of the House when he was a Member of Parliament and for his failure while still a member to respond sufficiently promptly to the Commissioner's investigation". It noted Malik had failed "to recognise his personal responsibility" to respond thus making the situation "more serious." A spokesman for Malik said the claim had previously been "approved twice by the parliamentary authorities and subsequently audited as eligible."

On 15 May 2009, Malik stepped down as justice minister in order to allow the Prime Minister's independent adviser on ministerial interests, Philip Mawer, to investigate accusations in The Daily Telegraph that he had breached the Ministerial Code by accepting preferential rent on his office and home. However, the inquiry concluded that he was in fact paying the market rent and Mawer cleared him of any breach. On 9 June, Malik rejoined the government as Communities and Local Government minister. After a further inquiry by the Parliamentary Commissioner for Standards, Malik also was cleared of parliamentary rules. On receiving the news Malik said: "I have now been cleared of breaching the ministerial code of conduct by the ministerial standards adviser Sir Philip Mawer, cleared of any abuse of expenses by a parliamentary review conducted by the Department of Resources, and now finally cleared of abusing office expenses by the Parliamentary Commissioner for Standards John Lyon. Today's outcome represents the end of a 12-month nightmare and I would like to thank all those family, friends and constituents who have stood by me and kept the faith – we have today all been vindicated."

Malik did not accept his full salary while a minister.

=== Racist hate material ===
Malik and his staff regularly had to intercept abusive and racist communications sent to his offices in Westminster and Dewsbury. In June 2008 Malik acted against YouTube after supporters of the far-right posted a 39-second video clip warning him not to "mess with the big boys", cutting from a still of the BNP leader, Nick Griffin, to a shot of Malik covered in blood. The video was removed from the site following a further complaint from the Equality and Human Rights Commission.

In December 2009, a 55-year-old man from Woodley, Berkshire pleaded guilty under the Malicious Communications Act of 1988, of sending an indecent or grossly offensive email to Malik for the purpose of causing distress or anxiety. He was fined £200.

=== Anthrax terror alert ===
In December 2009 an envelope containing suspicious white powder was sent to Malik's office at the House of Commons, triggering an anti-terrorist investigation. Comments written on the envelope suggested it had been sent by a supporter of the far-right. The substance was later found to be harmless.

== Later career ==
=== COVID-19 testing company and subsequent court case ===
During the COVID-19 pandemic, Malik and others established a COVID-19 testing company working for the NHS Test and Trace service, operating in Halifax, West Yorkshire.

National Trading Standards later took Malik to court over fraudulent trading, public nuisance and money laundering charges related to the company's operation, along with four other defendants, which came to trial in October 2025 at Bradford Crown Court. The defendants deny all the charges. The court expects the case to take 12 weeks.

== Personal life and family ==
Although over a hundred MPs employed family members in their offices, Malik was found to be the only MP to have employed his father, who was paid between £13,566 to £25,195 per year from the taxpayer-funded MP's Staffing Allowance fund. Failure to initially disclose this information was later referenced in Malik's use of expenses investigation.

== Notes ==
Parliament of the United Kingdom
Preceded by Ann Taylor	Member of Parliament for Dewsbury; 2005–2010	Succeeded by Simon Reevell
Preceded by None	Parliamentary Under-Secretary of State for International Development; 2007–2008	Succeeded by Michael Foster
Preceded by New position	Parliamentary Under-Secretary of State for Justice; 2008–2009	Succeeded by Claire Ward
Preceded by Sadiq Khan	Parliamentary Under-Secretary of State for Communities; 2009–2010	Succeeded by Joan Hanham, Baroness Hanham
