= Paula Sherriff =

British politician (born 1975)

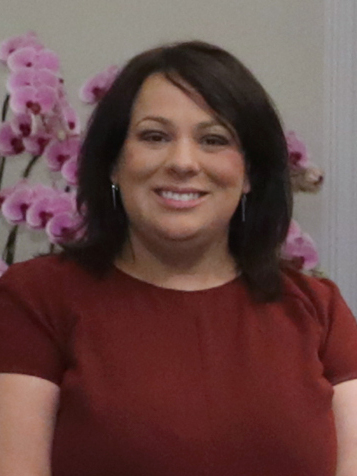
- Sherriff in 2017

Shadow Minister for Social Care and Mental Health
- In office 12 January 2018 – 6 November 2019
- Leader: Jeremy Corbyn
- Preceded by: Barbara Keeley (2016)
- Succeeded by: Liz Kendall (Note: As Shadow Minister for Social Care.) (2020)

Shadow Minister for Women and Equalities
- In office 17 October 2016 – 12 January 2018
- Leader: Jeremy Corbyn
- Preceded by: Cat Smith
- Succeeded by: Naz Shah

Member of Parliament for Dewsbury
- In office 7 May 2015 – 6 November 2019
- Preceded by: Simon Reevell
- Succeeded by: Mark Eastwood

Member of Wakefield Council for Pontefract North
- In office 3 May 2012 – 20 August 2015
- Preceded by: Philip Thomas
- Succeeded by: Lorna Malkin

Personal details
- Born: 16 April 1975 (age 51) Glasgow, Scotland
- Party: Labour
- Website: Official website

Paula Michelle Sherriff (born 16 April 1975) is a British Labour politician who served as the Member of Parliament (MP) for Dewsbury from 2015 to 2019.

== Early life ==
Prior to her election to Parliament, Sherriff worked in the police force, providing victim support, and in community care on the NHS frontline. Her sister Lee Sherriff was a member of Carlisle City Council, and unsuccessfully contested the Carlisle constituency at the 2015 general election.

== Political career ==
Sherriff served as a member of Wakefield District Council for Pontefract North from 2012, gaining the seat from the Conservatives, until her resignation 2015.

In November 2013, Sherriff was selected from an all-women shortlist by the Dewsbury Constituency Labour Party (CLP) as their prospective parliamentary candidate. She was elected to Parliament at the 2015 general election, gaining Dewsbury from incumbent Conservative Simon Reevell.

In July 2015, she was one of 48 Labour MPs who rebelled against the party whip to vote against the welfare bill. Later in the same year, she nominated Yvette Cooper in the 2015 Labour Party leadership election.

In September 2015, she secured an agreement from WHSmith to reduce the price of their goods in hospitals, against whom had she had launched a campaign for exploiting vulnerable patients and their families. Subsequently, the company agreed to match their high street prices in hospital stores.

In 2015, Sherriff was appointed as the Parliamentary Private Secretary (PPS) to Jon Trickett, then Shadow Communities and Local Government Secretary. On 11 January 2016, Sherriff resigned from this role to campaign against "Tory cuts" and to focus on her work on the health select committee.

Sherriff became the first backbench MP in Parliamentary history to have an amendment to a government Budget resolution successfully adopted when her motion to abolish the "Tampon Tax" was passed. On 21 March 2016, the government acknowledged that the tax would be abolished. Both the Prime Minister and the Leader of the Labour Party commended her work on the issue.

She supported Owen Smith in the 2016 Labour leadership election.

Sherriff secured a U-turn on planned reduction in bed numbers at Dewsbury hospital and has campaigned against the hospital being downgraded. Sherriff also campaigned against proposed downgrades to Huddersfield Royal Infirmary.

Sherriff was Chair of the All-Party Parliamentary Groups on Hate Crime and Women's Health.

Sherriff was re-elected at the 2017 general election with an increased majority.

She was appointed Shadow Minister for Mental Health and Social Care in January 2018 and has led on the Labour Party's efforts to secure additional funding for mental health services and provide early intervention with effective child and adolescent mental health services.

In September 2019, Sherriff took part in the "humbug debate" and criticised Prime Minister Boris Johnson for using inflammatory language.

In 2018, Labour MP Barry Sheerman accused then Labour MP Chris Williamson of campaigning for the deselection of moderate incumbents including Sherriff. Nevertheless, she was unanimously re-selected the following year.

She lost her seat to the Conservative Party's Mark Eastwood at the 2019 general election.

In 2020, Sherriff twice unsuccessfully stood for a seat on the Labour Party's National Executive Committee in a spring by-election and an autumn regular election. She stood as an independent in the by-election, but was endorsed by the Tribune group of MPs in the subsequent contest alongside former MP Liz McInnes and former MEP Theresa Griffin.

In 2020, Sherriff announced her candidacy to contend the Labour nomination for the new office of Mayor of West Yorkshire, however, she withdrew due to her breast cancer treatment. LabourList listed her as a potential Labour candidate for the 2021 by-election in the neighbouring constituency of Batley and Spen, but she did not run.

== Personal life ==
In March 2020, Sherriff was diagnosed with breast cancer.

== Notes ==
Parliament of the United Kingdom
Preceded by Simon Reevell	Member of Parliament for Dewsbury; 2015–2019	Succeeded by Mark Eastwood
