= Kathryn Stone =

UK Parliamentary Commissioner for Standards

Kathryn Stone OBE

6th Parliamentary Commissioner for Standards
- Appointed by: House of Commons Commission
- Preceded by: Kathryn Hudson
- Succeeded by: Daniel Greenberg

Personal details
- Born: Kathryn Elizabeth Stone; 8 August 1963 (age 63) Derby, England
- Children: 3
- Education: University of East London; Loughborough University

Kathryn Elizabeth Stone OBE (born 8 August 1963) is the former independent Parliamentary Commissioner for Standards of the British House of Commons from January 2018 until December 2022.

== Early life ==
Kathryn Stone was born in Derby and grew up in Belper. She attended Belper High School. On leaving school, she became a houseparent for children with special needs. She graduated a bachelor's in sociology in the University of East London in 1985, qualified as a social worker in 1985, before going on to graduate with a master's in women studies from Loughborough University in 1990.

She spent 11 years as the chief executive of the national charity Voice UK, being awarded an OBE in 2007 for services to people with learning disabilities.

In 2009, Stone was made a Chartered Director and awarded Fellowship of the Institute of Directors.

In 2012 she was appointed as the Commissioner for Victims and Survivors for Northern Ireland. She was also a commissioner for the Independent Police Complaints Commission, overseeing investigations for seven police forces in the Midlands and North, including into the Rotherham force’s failure to tackle child sex abuse.

In 2016 she took the post of Legal Ombudsman for England and Wales. She was awarded an honorary Doctor of Laws by the University of Derby in 2018.

== Parliamentary Commissioner ==
In January 2018, Stone was appointed as the Parliamentary Commissioner for Standards from a list of 81 candidates for a five year term. Her high profile cases included finding against the prime minister Boris Johnson over a free holiday he took in Mustique courtesy of a Tory donor. She took over responsibility for the inquiry into Keith Vaz's behaviour when she complained that he had "failed, repeatedly, to answer direct questions, given incomplete answers and his account [had], in parts, been incredible".

In 2021, she found that the MP Owen Paterson had breached the MP's Code of Conduct, a finding which resulted in the Parliamentary Standards Committee recommending a suspension from the Commons for a period of 30 sitting days. Despite the fact that the prime minister encouraged a three-line whip on an amendment to change the standards system, the public backlash caused a reversal of policy and the next day Paterson resigned.

In August 2022, she found that both Labour leader Keir Starmer and Shadow Foreign Secretary David Lammy had inadvertently broken the MPs' code of conduct.

== Bar Standards Board ==
On 1 September 2022 she became the Chair of the Bar Standards Board.

== Personal life ==
Stone has three children.
