= Jowitt's Dictionary of English Law =

Law dictionary covering England and Wales

Jowitt's Dictionary of English Law is a comprehensive law dictionary covering the law of England and Wales, providing explanations of legal terms and their historical context.

The first edition (Dictionary of English Law) compiled by William Jowitt, 1st Earl Jowitt (1885–1957), was published posthumously in 1959, completed by Clifford Walsh.

The second edition was published in 1977, edited by John Burke. The third edition, edited by Daniel Greenberg, was published in 2010. The fourth edition was published in 2015. The seventh edition was published in 2026.

== See also ==
- Bell's Dictionary and Digest of the Law of Scotland
- Biographical Dictionary of the Common Law
- Black's Law Dictionary
- Bouvier's Law Dictionary
- List of legal abbreviations
- Stroud's Judicial Dictionary of Words and Phrases
