= South Suffolk =

UK Parliament constituency (since 1983)

Coordinates: 52.06°N 0.94°E

- County constituency for the House of Commons
- Interactive map of boundaries since 2024
- Location within the East of England
- County: Suffolk
- Electorate: 71,170 (March 2020)
- Major settlements: Sudbury, Hadleigh and Great Cornard

Current constituency
- Created: 1983
- Member of Parliament: James Cartlidge (Conservative)
- Seats: One
- Created from: Sudbury and Woodbridge and Bury St Edmunds

South Suffolk is a constituency (Note: A county constituency (for the purposes of election expenses and type of returning officer)) represented in the House of Commons of the UK Parliament since 2015 by James Cartlidge, a Conservative. (Note: As with all constituencies, the constituency elects one Member of Parliament (MP) by the first past the post system of election at least every five years.)

== Constituency profile ==
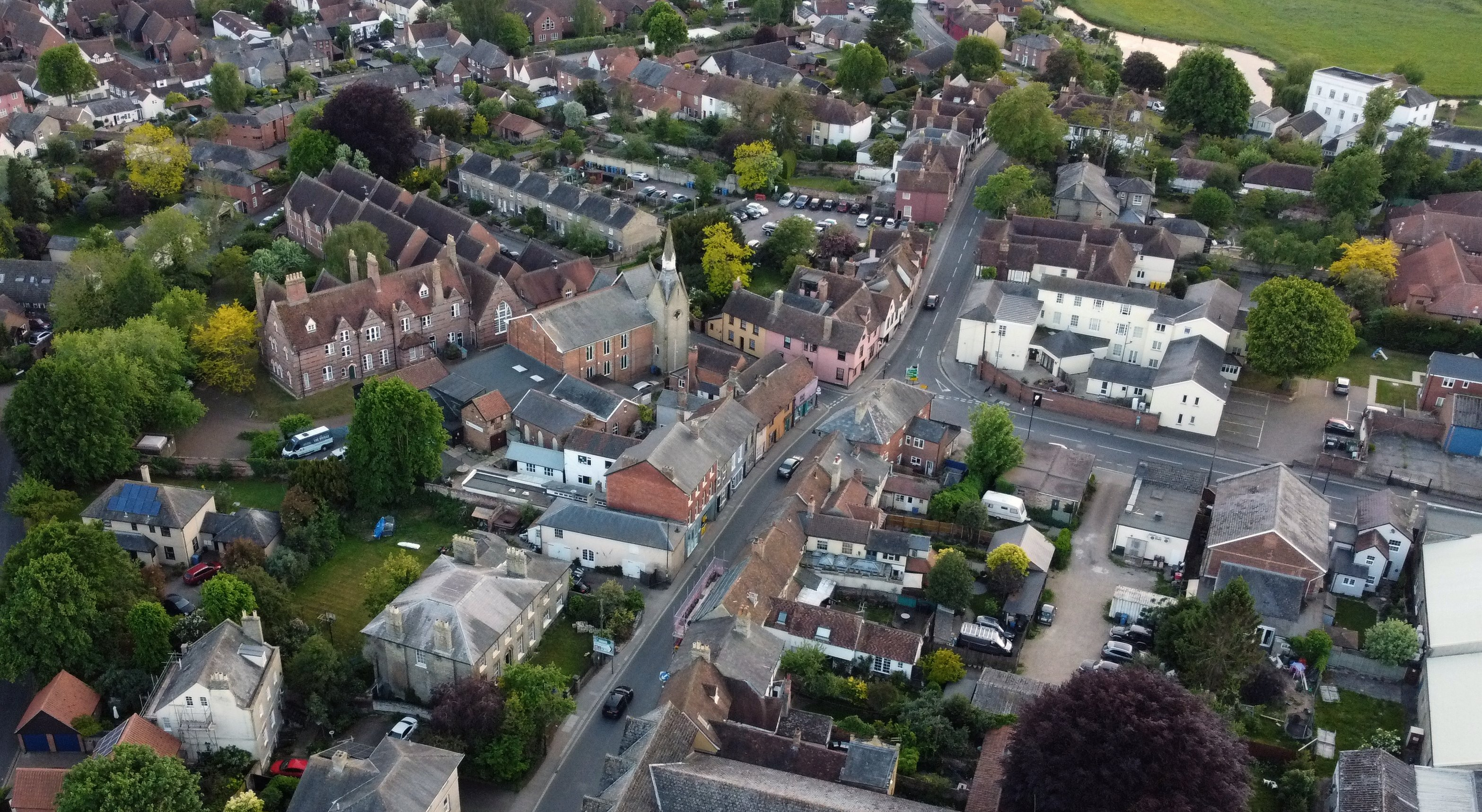
Sudbury

South Suffolk is a constituency in Suffolk in the East of England and is coterminous with the Babergh district. Its largest town is Sudbury, which has a population of around 25,000. Other settlements include the town of Hadleigh and the villages of Capel St Mary, Pinewood and Long Melford.

This is a large, rural constituency containing many small villages. Sudbury is a historic market town and was traditionally a busy inland port on the River Stour, which connected it to the coastal ports of Harwich and Felixstowe. Hadleigh contains many listed buildings and grew from rural trades like wool and cloth. Pinewood is a suburban village on the outskirts of Ipswich with many new housing developments. Hadleigh, Capel St Mary and Pinewood are affluent whilst the rest of the constituency, including Sudbury, has average levels of wealth. House prices here are generally similar to the regional and national averages.

South Suffolk has a large retired population and low proportions of young and middle-aged adults. Residents have average rates of income, high levels of homeownership, and the child poverty rate is below-average. They have average levels of education and a high proportion work in the agriculture, retail and manufacturing sectors. White people made up 97% of the population at the 2021 census.

At the local district council, Sudbury and Hadleigh are mostly represented by Green Party councillors whilst the rural areas elected a mixture of Conservatives, Liberal Democrats and independents. At the county council, which held elections more recently (in 2026), some Reform UK representatives were elected in Sudbury and the rural villages. An estimated 54% of voters in South Suffolk supported leaving the European Union in the 2016 referendum, marginally higher than the UK-wide figure of 52%.

== History ==
South Suffolk is one of seven constituencies in the county of Suffolk and was created by boundary changes which came into force for the 1983 general election. It was formed primarily from areas to the west of Ipswich and the River Orwell, including the towns of Sudbury and Hadleigh, which had formed the majority of the abolished constituency of Sudbury and Woodbridge. Extended westwards to include Haverhill and surrounding areas, transferred from Bury St Edmunds.

Between 1559 and 1844, the constituency of Sudbury represented the town on the southwestern border with Essex, but this constituency was disenfranchised for corruption in 1844.

In every election, the Conservative candidate has been elected or re-elected; until 2015, said candidate was Tim Yeo, who was deselected prior to the 2015 general election; he was succeeded as Conservative candidate, and subsequently MP, by James Cartlidge.

== Boundaries and boundary changes ==
=== Historic ===
Map of boundaries 1997–2024

==== 1983–1997 ====
- The District of Babergh; and
- The Borough of St Edmundsbury wards of Cangle, Castle, Cavendish, Chalkstone, Clare, Clements, Hundon, Kedington, St Mary's and Helions, Wickhambrook, and Withersfield.

==== 1997–2024 ====
- The District of Babergh, and
- The Borough of St Edmundsbury wards of Cavendish, and Clare.

All but two of the Borough of St Edmundsbury wards, including the town of Haverhill, were transferred to the new constituency of West Suffolk.

=== Current ===
Further to the 2023 review of Westminster constituencies, which came into effect for the 2024 general election, the composition of the constituency is now coterminous with the District of Babergh.

The small part previously in the former Borough of St Edmundsbury – now part of the District of West Suffolk – was transferred to the constituency of West Suffolk.

== Members of Parliament ==
Sudbury & Woodbridge prior to 1983

Election	Member	Party
1983	Tim Yeo	Conservative
2015	James Cartlidge	Conservative

== Elections ==
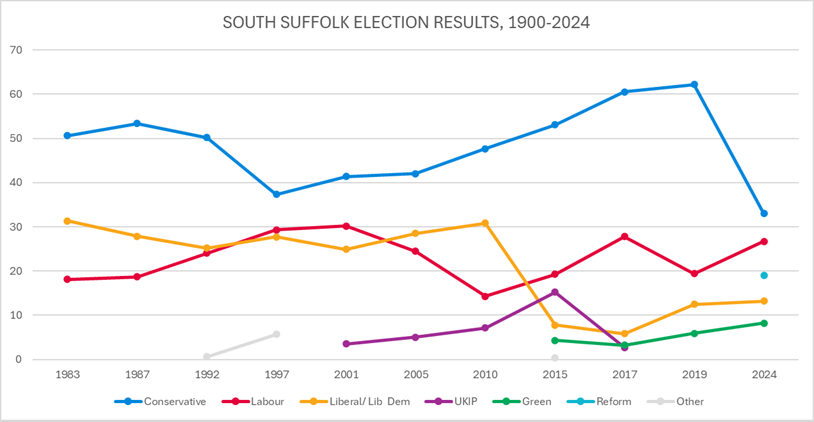
Election results 1983–2024

=== Elections in the 2020s ===
General election 2024: South Suffolk
Party	Candidate	Votes	%	±%
Conservative	James Cartlidge	16,082	33.0	−29.1
Labour	Emma Bishton	13,035	26.7	+7.5
Reform	Bev England	9,252	19.0	N/A
Liberal Democrats	Tom Bartleet	6,424	13.2	+0.5
Green	Jessie Carter	4,008	8.2	+2.2
Majority		3,047	6.3	−36.6
Turnout		48,801	65.7	−4.8
Registered electors		73,385		
Conservative hold		Swing	−18.3	

=== Elections in the 2010s ===
2019 notional result
Party	Vote	%
Conservative	31,094	62.1
Labour	9,621	19.2
Liberal Democrats	6,360	12.7
Green	3,031	6.0
Turnout	50,106	70.5
Electorate	71,070	

General election 2019: South Suffolk
Party	Candidate	Votes	%	±%
Conservative	James Cartlidge	33,270	62.2	+1.7
Labour	Elizabeth Hughes	10,373	19.4	−8.4
Liberal Democrats	David Beavan	6,702	12.5	+6.7
Green	Robert Lindsay	3,144	5.9	+2.7
Majority		22,897	42.8	+10.1
Turnout		53,489	70.2	−1.6
Conservative hold		Swing	+5.1	

General election 2017: South Suffolk
Party	Candidate	Votes	%	±%
Conservative	James Cartlidge	32,829	60.5	+7.4
Labour	Emma Bishton	15,080	27.8	+8.5
Liberal Democrats	Andrew Aalders-Dunthorne	3,154	5.8	−2.0
Green	Robert Lindsay	1,723	3.2	−1.1
UKIP	Aidan Powlesland	1,449	2.7	−12.5
Majority		17,749	32.7	−1.1
Turnout		54,235	71.8	+0.8
Conservative hold		Swing	−0.5	

General election 2015: South Suffolk
Party	Candidate	Votes	%	±%
Conservative	James Cartlidge	27,546	53.1	+5.4
Labour	Jane Basham	10,001	19.3	+5.0
UKIP	Steven Whalley	7,897	15.2	+8.1
Liberal Democrats	Grace Weaver	4,044	7.8	−23.0
Green	Robert Lindsay	2,253	4.3	N/A
CPA	Stephen Todd	166	0.3	N/A
Majority		17,545	33.8	+16.9
Turnout		51,907	71.0	+0.1
Conservative hold		Swing	+0.2	

General election 2010: South Suffolk
Party	Candidate	Votes	%	±%
Conservative	Tim Yeo	24,550	47.7	+5.7
Liberal Democrats	Nigel Bennett	15,861	30.8	+2.3
Labour	Emma Bishton	7,368	14.3	−10.2
UKIP	David Campbell Bannerman	3,637	7.1	+2.1
Majority		8,689	16.9	+3.3
Turnout		51,416	70.9	+2.1
Conservative hold		Swing	+1.6	

=== Elections in the 2000s ===
General election 2005: South Suffolk
Party	Candidate	Votes	%	±%
Conservative	Tim Yeo	20,471	42.0	+0.6
Liberal Democrats	Kathy Pollard	13,865	28.5	+3.6
Labour	Kevin Craig	11,917	24.5	−5.7
UKIP	James Carver	2,454	5.0	+1.5
Majority		6,606	13.6	+2.4
Turnout		48,707	71.8	+5.6
Conservative hold		Swing	−4.7	

General election 2001: South Suffolk
Party	Candidate	Votes	%	±%
Conservative	Tim Yeo	18,748	41.4	+4.1
Labour	Marc Young	13,667	30.2	+0.9
Liberal Democrats	Tessa Munt	11,296	24.9	−2.8
UKIP	Derek Allen	1,582	3.5	N/A
Majority		5,081	11.2	+3.2
Turnout		45,293	66.2	−11.0
Conservative hold		Swing	+3.5	

=== Elections in the 1990s ===
General election 1997: South Suffolk
Party	Candidate	Votes	%	±%
Conservative	Tim Yeo	19,402	37.3	−14.0
Labour	Paul Bishop	15,227	29.3	+7.5
Liberal Democrats	Kathy Pollard	14,395	27.7	+2.5
Referendum	Somerset Carlo de Chair	2,740	5.3	N/A
Natural Law	Angela Holland	211	0.4	−0.2
Majority		4,175	8.0	−25.0
Turnout		51,975	77.2	−4.5
Conservative hold		Swing	−9.1	

General election 1992: South Suffolk
Party	Candidate	Votes	%	±%
Conservative	Tim Yeo	34,793	50.2	−3.2
Liberal Democrats	Kathy Pollard	17,504	25.2	−2.7
Labour	Stephen Hesford	16,623	24.0	+5.3
Natural Law	T. Aisbitt	420	0.6	N/A
Majority		17,289	25.0	−0.5
Turnout		69,340	81.7	+4.1
Conservative hold		Swing	−4.3	

=== Elections in the 1980s ===
General election 1987: South Suffolk
Party	Candidate	Votes	%	±%
Conservative	Tim Yeo	33,972	53.4	+2.8
Liberal	Christopher Bradford	17,729	27.9	−3.4
Labour	Anthony Bavington	11,876	18.7	+0.6
Majority		16,243	25.5	+6.2
Turnout		63,577	77.6	+1.3
Conservative hold		Swing	+3.1	

General election 1983: South Suffolk
Party	Candidate	Votes	%	±%
Conservative	Tim Yeo	29,469	50.6	
Liberal	Richard Kemp	18,200	31.3	
Labour	Stephen Billcliffe	10,516	18.1	
Majority		11,269	19.3	
Turnout		58,185	76.3	
Conservative win (new seat)				

== See also ==
- List of parliamentary constituencies in Suffolk
- List of parliamentary constituencies in the East of England (region)
