= Sir John Thursby Community College =

Coordinates: 53.8035°N 2.2179°W

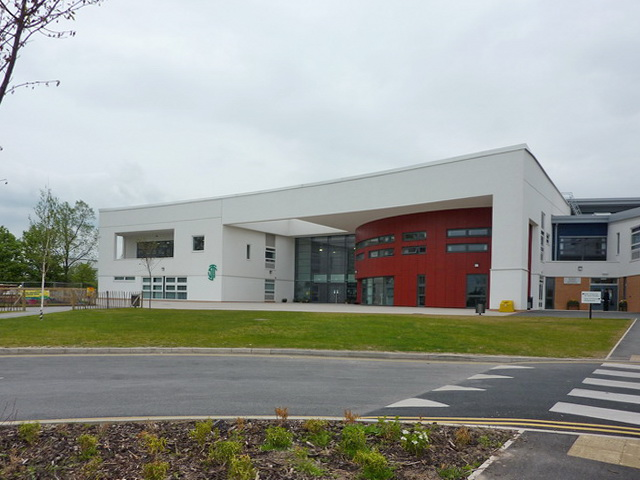

Location
- Eastern Avenue; Burnley, Lancashire, BB10 2AT; England

Information
- Type: Foundation school
- Established: 2006
- Local authority: Lancashire
- Department for Education URN: 134996 Tables
- Ofsted: Reports
- Chair of Governors: Shameem-Ara Khan
- Head teacher: Matt Renshaw
- Gender: mixed
- Age: 11 to 16
- Enrolment: 974
- Colours: Black & Silver
- Website: Sir John Thursby Community College

Sir John Thursby Community College is a mixed 11-16 comprehensive school in Burnley, Lancashire, England. It is named for Sir John Hardy Thursby (1826-1901), a local benefactor. It shares its site with Ridgewood Community High, a special school with places for 90 students.

== History ==
The school opened in September 2006 as part of a plan to replace all of the district's 11-16 schools, funded by a government public–private partnership programme called Building Schools for the Future. It was formed from the merger of the former Barden High School and Walshaw High School, and occupies the former Walshaw site. Elaine Dawson, who had been the head of Walshaw since 2004, became the new school's first head teacher.

=== Former schools ===
Barden High School was a boys comprehensive school with only approximately 350 pupils in 2002.

Walshaw High School was a girls high school with about 800 pupils and has been described as "a successful and flourishing school".

=== New building ===
The School originally operated from the former Walshaw building, however in 2009 the schools moved a new £33M complex on the same site, with the former Walshaw building subsequently being demolished and new playing fields made in its place. In January 2024 Mr Wrenschaw became headteacher of sir john thursby.

== Attainment ==
Pupils with equivalent of 5 or more GCSEs grade C or above (inc. English & Maths)
Year (Source)	Students	% special educational needs	England %	School %
2004* (BBC)(BBC)	(76 175) 251	(7.9 8.0) 7.9	42.7	(11.0 35.0) 27.0
2005* (BBC)(BBC)	(62 145) 264	(12.9 15.1) 11.7	44.9	(21.0 28.0) 20.0
2006	-	-	-	-
2007 (BBC)	213	8.4	46.7	27.0
2008 (BBC)	209	15.7	47.6	26.0
2009 (BBC)	175	42.9	49.8	42.0
2010 (DfE)	147	40.9	53.4	47.0
2011 (DfE)	159	21.0	58.9	38.0
2012 (DfE)	182	25.0	59.4	38.0
2013 (DfE)	201	20.0	59.2	48.0
2014 (DfE)	200	11.0	53.4	36.0
2015 (DfE)	194	3.0	53.8	48.0
*Figures for previous school, in this case: Barden (boys) & Walshaw (girls) High Schools

In 2007, the school's value-added measure was 987.5 (national average 1000).

== Notable former pupils ==
=== Barden High School ===
- Paul Abbott, television screenwriter, creator of Shameless.
- Shahid Malik, politician.
- Craig Heap, Commonwealth Games Gold Medal-winning gymnast.
- Jay Rodriguez, footballer.

=== Walshaw High School ===
- Maya Vaja, radio presenter.

=== Sir John Thursby Community College ===
- Marko Maroši , footballer.
