= Gordon Downey =

British ombudsman (1928–2022)

Sir Gordon Stanley Downey KCB (26 April 1928 – 12 April 2022) was a British ombudsman who was the country's first Parliamentary Commissioner for Standards.

== Life and career ==
Gordon Stanley Downey was born in Battersea, London on 26 April 1928.

The Office of the Parliamentary Commissioner for Standards was set up by the House of Commons in 1995 as a result of recommendations made by the Committee on Standards in Public Life. He resigned shortly after Trial by Conspiracy by J Boyd Hunt was published in 1998, casting doubt on his report about Neil Hamilton and the cash-for-questions affair.

Downey was previously chairman of the investors' "watchdog", the Personal Investment Authority.

Downey died from cancer at a nursing home in Battersea, on 12 April 2022, at the age of 93.
