= EdenTree =

EdenTree Investment Management
- Formerly: Ecclesiastical Investment Management
- Type: Private limited company
- Industry: Financial services
- Founded: 1988; 38 years ago
- Headquarters: London, United Kingdom
- Number of locations: London, and Gloucester
- Area served: United Kingdom
- Key people: Andy Clark (CEO), Charlie Thomas (CIO)
- Products: Investment management
- Owner: Benefact Group
- Website: www.edentreeim.com

EdenTree is a British investment management firm operating as a subsidiary of Ecclesiastical Insurance Group and wholly owned by Benefact Group.

Although EdenTree is part of the Benefact Group, a charity-owned financial services group, EdenTree operates as an independent investment management business. It is not part of the Church of England and does not undertake charitable or ecclesiastical activities.

== History ==
Formerly known as Ecclesiastical Investment Management Limited, the firm launched its first UK ethical equity fund in 1988.

It was rebranded EdenTree in 2015 as the word 'Ecclesiastical' was not thought to resonate with asset management and the company wanted to broaden its appeal beyond its traditional clergy investors. As its former name suggests, EdenTree was started as a means for Church of England dioceses to build wealth to support their clergy. Its remit now extends beyond the Church of England to encompass wider charitable and ethical concerns.

The senior fund manager said at the time of rebranding that being linked to the Church of England can be a “double-edged sword”, enticing for some investors but scary for others. “We have a number of Church of England dioceses that invest with us. But, equally, for some [investors] having a faith connotation can be a drawback.”

In March 2022, Ecclesiastical Insurance Group rebranded as Benefact Group.

== See also ==
- Ecclesiastical Insurance
- Christian finance
