= Elizabeth Filkin =

British civil servant

Elizabeth Filkin CBE
- Born: Elizabeth Jill Filkin; 24 November 1940 (age 85); Keynsham, Somerset, England
- Education: Birmingham University
- Occupations: Public functionary; civil servant

Elizabeth Jill Filkin CBE (born 24 November 1940) is a British public functionary and former civil servant. She was the United Kingdom's Parliamentary Commissioner for Standards between February 1999 and 2002.

Born in Keynsham, Somerset, Filkin studied at Clifton High School in Bristol and Birmingham University, where she was awarded LLB in Law in 1973. She started her career as a lecturer and community worker at the National Institute for Social Work between 1968 and 1971. She then worked as community work services officer in the London Borough of Brent (1971–75); lecturer in social studies at the University of Liverpool (1975–83); chief executive, then director of community services at the National Association of Citizens Advice Bureaux (1983–90); assistant chief executive, then revenue adjudicator at the London Docklands Development Corporation (1990–1995); and adjudicator at the Inland Revenue, Customs and Excise and Contributions Agency (1995–99) before becoming Parliamentary Commissioner for Standards in February 1999. Her departure was controversial. Many considered she had performed well and should not have had to reapply for the role when her three-year contract came up for renewal.

On 18 July 2011, it was announced that Elizabeth Filkin would lead an inquiry related to the News International phone hacking scandal which would "recommend changes to links between the police and the media, including how to extend transparency." The report of the inquiry was published at the beginning of 2012.

Filkin was appointed Commander of the Order of the British Empire (CBE) in the 2014 Birthday Honours for public service.
