= Mark Eastwood =

British politician (born 1971)

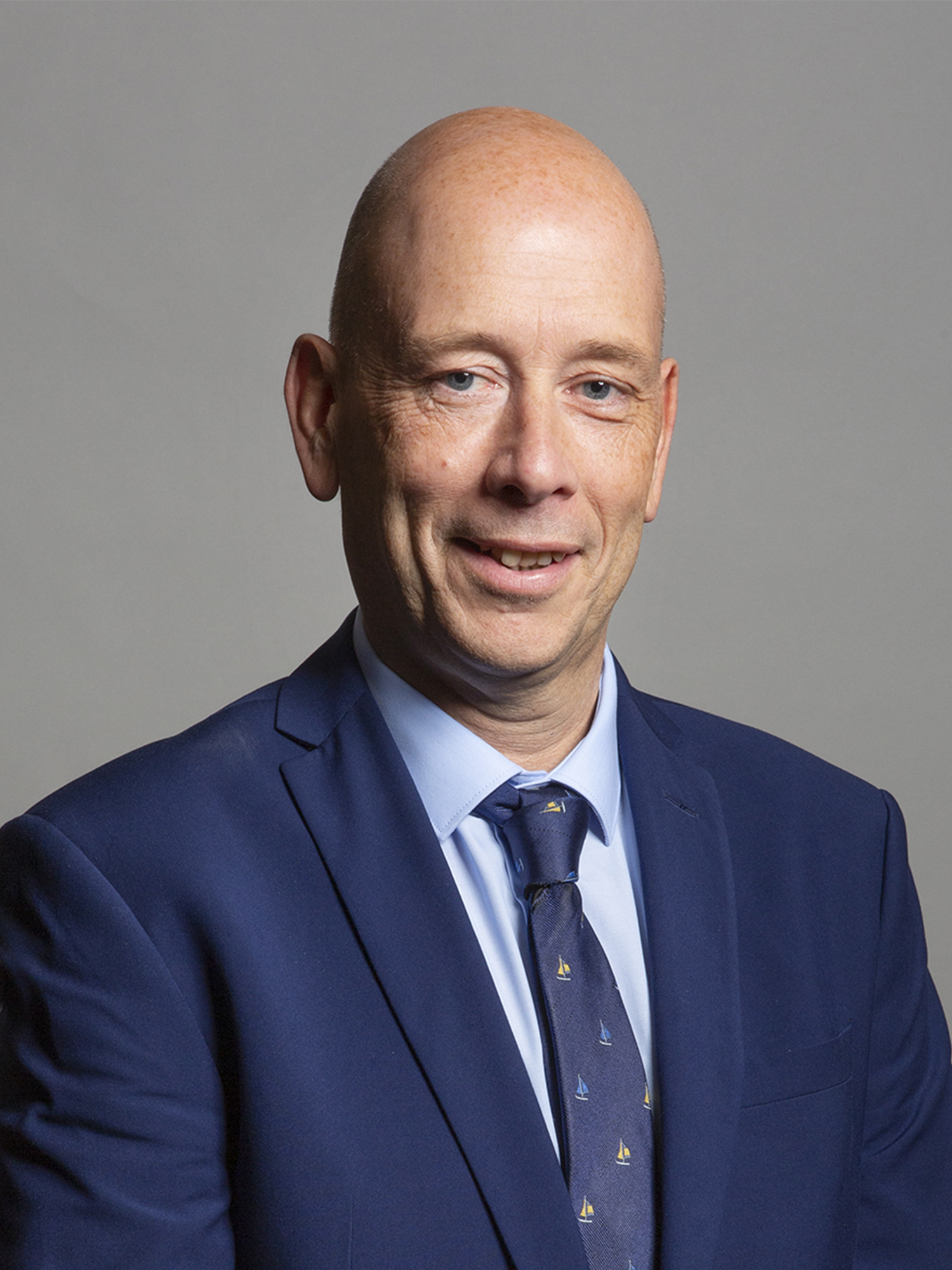
- Official portrait, 2019

Member of Parliament for Dewsbury
- In office 12 December 2019 – 30 May 2024
- Preceded by: Paula Sherriff
- Succeeded by: Constituency abolished

Personal details
- Born: 14 March 1971 (age 55)
- Party: Conservative
- Children: 2
- Education: Batley Boys High School

Mark Simon Eastwood (born 14 March 1971) is a British Conservative Party politician who served as the Member of Parliament (MP) for Dewsbury from 2019 to 2024.

== Early life and career ==
Eastwood grew up in Thornhill Lees, before moving to the Wilton Estate in Batley at the age of six. He joined the Conservative Party at the age of seventeen, while he was a student at Batley Boys High School, now Upper Batley High School.

Prior to becoming an MP, Eastwood worked for a company which provides medical furniture and equipment to the NHS, and served as Yorkshire and Humber representative of the Conservative Workers & Trade Unionists.

== Political career ==
=== Pre-parliamentary Career ===
Eastwood had a total of six unsuccessful attempts standing for the Dewsbury East ward of Kirklees Council.

=== Parliamentary career ===
Eastwood was elected as the MP for Dewsbury at the 2019 general election, gaining the seat from Labour's Paula Sherriff.

He was a member of the Regulatory Reform Committee and the Committee on the Future Relationship with the European Union. Eastwood is also a member of the APPGs on British Muslims, Football, and the Furniture Industry, as well as being a member of the Parliamentary Football Club.

His first overseas trip was to Pakistan in 2020 as part of an all-party delegation. On 23 August 2021, Prime Minister Boris Johnson appointed him as the UK's trade envoy to the country. His constituency of Dewsbury was abolished for the 2024 general election due to the 2023 Periodic Review of Westminster constituencies. He instead contested the new constituency of Ossett and Denby Dale but lost, placing second with 28.9 per cent of the vote.

==== Political views ====
Eastwood identifies as a "moderate, compassionate Conservative". He was a supporter of Brexit, having worked on local Vote Leave campaigns during the 2016 referendum.

During the Conservative Party leadership election in 2022, Eastwood supported Liz Truss. He was a supporter of Boris Johnson's time in Number 10, saying he was “saddened and disappointed” at his resignation, and he continued to have his full support.

== Post-parliamentary career ==
Following his defeat at the 2024 general election, Eastwood began work as a Business Development Manager for M Group Rail & Aviation.

== Personal life ==
Eastwood has a wife, two children and is a Leeds United season ticket holder. He has been known to DJ at private events held locally.

Parliament of the United Kingdom
Preceded by Paula Sherriff	Member of Parliament for Dewsbury; 2019–2024	Constituency abolished
