= John Lyon (civil servant) =

John MacDonald Lyon CB (born 12 April 1948) was the British Parliamentary Commissioner for Standards from 1 January 2008 to 31 December 2012.

In 2009, Lyon's workload was increased by the MPs expenses scandal, which generated considerable interest in parliamentary standards or rather the lack of them. In 2010, he became involved in investigating a "cash for influence" scandal. Despite working on such high-profile cases, Lyon himself maintained a low profile, something which attracted adverse comment.

In 2012, Lyon stood for election to the Council of the National Trust but was not elected.
