= James Cartlidge =

British politician (born 1974)

James Cartlidge MP
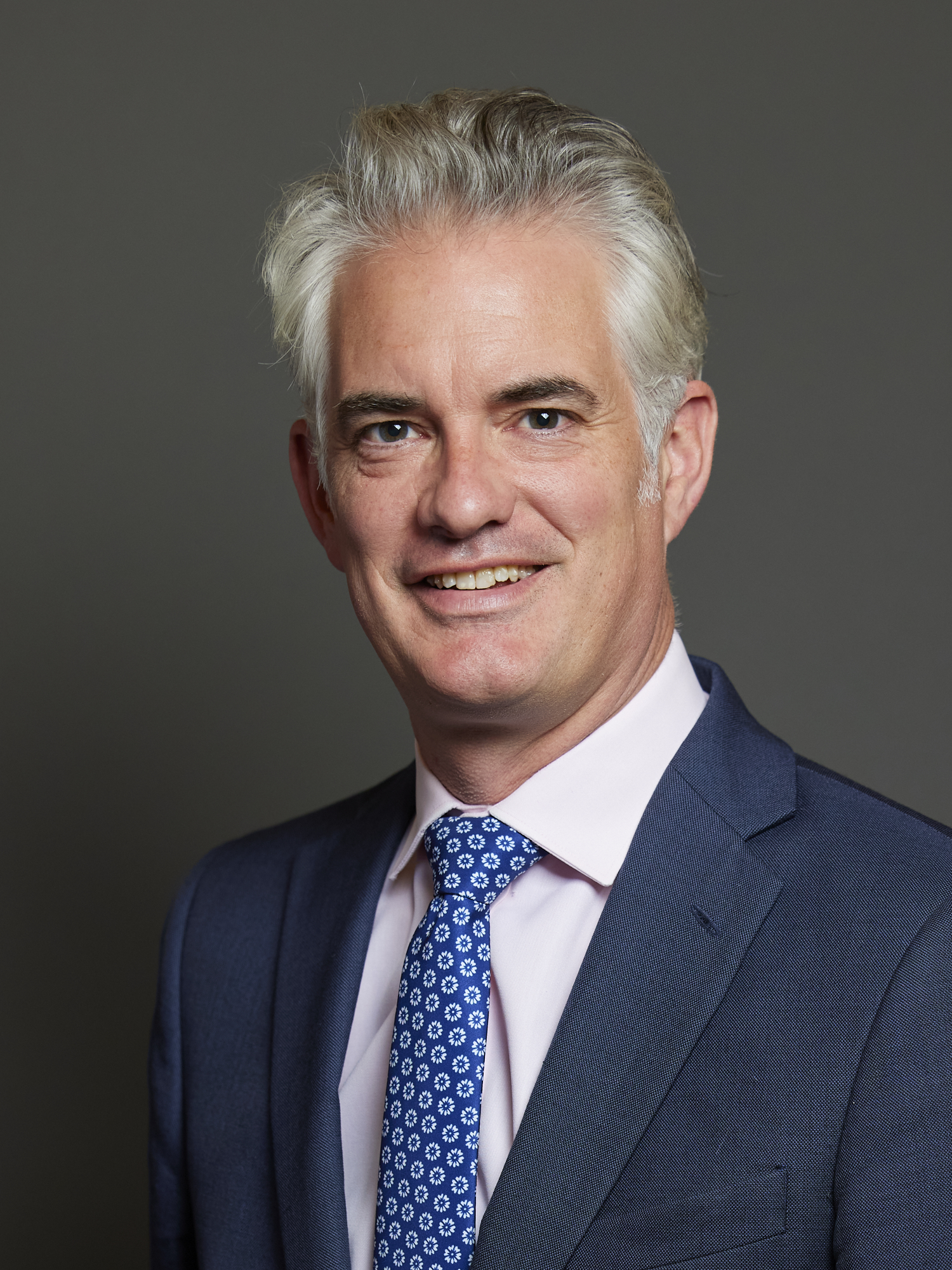
- Official portrait, 2024

Shadow Secretary of State for Defence
- Incumbent
- Assumed office 8 July 2024
- Leader: Rishi Sunak; Kemi Badenoch
- Preceded by: John Healey

Minister of State for Defence Procurement
- In office 21 April 2023 – 5 July 2024
- Prime Minister: Rishi Sunak
- Preceded by: Alex Chalk
- Succeeded by: Maria Eagle

Exchequer Secretary to the Treasury
- In office 28 October 2022 – 21 April 2023
- Prime Minister: Rishi Sunak
- Preceded by: Felicity Buchan
- Succeeded by: Gareth Davies

Parliamentary Under-Secretary of State for Justice
- In office 17 September 2021 – 7 July 2022
- Prime Minister: Boris Johnson
- Preceded by: Alex Chalk
- Succeeded by: Sarah Dines

Member of Parliament for South Suffolk
- Incumbent
- Assumed office 7 May 2015
- Preceded by: Tim Yeo
- Majority: 3,047 (6.3%)

Personal details
- Born: James Roger Cartlidge; 30 April 1974 (age 52) Edgware, London, England
- Party: Conservative
- Spouse: Emily Cartlidge (m. 2004)
- Children: 4
- Relatives: Gerald Howarth (father-in-law)
- Education: University of Manchester (BSc)
- Website: Official website

James Roger Cartlidge (born 30 April 1974) is a British politician who has served as the Member of Parliament (MP) for South Suffolk since 2015. A member of the Conservative Party, he was appointed Shadow Secretary of State for Defence in 2024 by former prime minister Rishi Sunak in July 2024; when Kemi Badenoch succeeded Sunak as Leader of the Opposition in November 2024 she reappointed Cartlidge to the brief. He had previously served as Minister of State for Defence Procurement from 2023 to 2024, Exchequer Secretary to the Treasury from 2022 to 2023, as well as Parliamentary Under-Secretary of State for Justice from 2021 to 2022.

== Early life and career ==
Born on 30 April 1974 in Edgware in north-west London, Cartlidge was educated at Queen Elizabeth's School, which was a comprehensive when he attended but is now an all-boys grammar school in Chipping Barnet, north London. Cartlidge then went to the University of Manchester, where he read Economics, graduating BSc.

After university, Cartlidge ran and founded Share to Buy Ltd, a SME and shared ownership property portal and host of the London Home Show, a major event for first-time buyers.

== Parliamentary career ==
At the 2005 general election, Cartlidge contested Lewisham Deptford as the Conservative candidate, coming third with 12.4% of the vote behind the incumbent Labour MP Joan Ruddock and the Liberal Democrat candidate Columba Blango.

=== 1st term (2015–2017) ===
Cartlidge was elected to Parliament at the 2015 general election as MP for South Suffolk with 53.1% of the vote and a majority of 17,545.

In July 2015, in one of his first actions in Parliament, Cartlidge brought a barrel of local beer from his constituency into the House of Commons to drink with his new parliamentary colleagues.

Also in July 2015, Cartlidge took a train journey from Sudbury to Marks Tey with rail executives from Abellio Greater Anglia, Network Rail and officials from the Department for Transport to highlight issues affecting those travelling by train to his constituency.

In November 2015, he held a South Suffolk Food Day in the Commons featuring businesses such as Jimmy's Farm, Suffolk Food Hall and Gifford's Hall Vineyard. Cartlidge has worked to improve mobile phone signal in his constituency: in February 2016 he launched a campaign in Boxford for greater efforts to provide mobile telephone coverage in 'not-spots'.

Cartlidge was elected to serve on the Public Accounts Commission in November 2015 and the Work and Pensions Committee in October 2016.

He was opposed to Brexit prior to the 2016 referendum.

=== 2nd term (2017–2019) ===
At the snap 2017 general election, Cartlidge was returned as MP for South Suffolk with an increased vote share of 60.5% and an increased majority of 17,749.

In January 2018 he was appointed as PPS to Health Secretary, Jeremy Hunt, and remained his PPS when Hunt was promoted Foreign Secretary.

In July 2019 Cartlidge was one of 73 MPs to vote against equal marriage in Northern Ireland. He has publicly expressed his strong support for equal marriage but voted against imposing this law in Northern Ireland 'in absentia'.

=== 3rd term (2019–2024) ===
Cartlidge was again re-elected at the 2019 general election with an increased vote share of 62.2% and an increased majority of 22,897.

In October 2020, Cartlidge wrote in the East Anglian Daily Times that COVID-19 exacerbated the need for part-time season rail tickets.

On 17 September 2021, Cartlidge was appointed Parliamentary Under-Secretary of State for Justice and an Assistant Government Whip in the Cabinet reshuffle. During his time in office, he introduced the Statutory Instrument which raised magistrates' sentencing powers in England and Wales from 6 to 12 months. Cartlidge also delivered the Government's initial response to the Criminal Legal Aid Independent Review, which resulted in most criminal legal aid fees being increased by 15%.

On 7 July 2022, Cartlidge resigned from HMG in the wake of widespread criticism of Boris Johnson's mishandling of the Chris Pincher scandal, which precipitated a large number of ministerial resignations.

Cartlidge served as Exchequer Secretary to the Treasury from 28 October 2022 to 21 April 2023. On his last day in office, he oversaw clauses of the Finance Bill introducing a new lower rate of alcohol duty specifically for draught beer and cider.

He replaced Alex Chalk as Minister of State for Defence Procurement in April 2023, following a mini-reshuffle.

On 22 February 2024, Cartlidge launched the Defence Drone Strategy, committing the Ministry of Defence to its first comprehensive capability plan for uncrewed systems. On 28 February 2024, in a Commons Oral Statement he set out plans to overhaul defence acquisition, introducing a new Integrated Procurement Model.

=== 4th term (2024–) ===
At the 2024 general election, Cartlidge was again re-elected, but with a decreased vote share of 33% and a decreased majority of 3,047.

Following the Conservative Party's defeat at the general election, and the subsequent formation of the Starmer ministry, Cartlidge was appointed Shadow Defence Secretary in Rishi Sunak's caretaker Shadow Cabinet. He retained this post upon Kemi Badenoch's election as Conservative Party Leader. In April 2025 he visited Ukraine and had talks with senior officials.

In November 2025, he stood in for Conservative leader Kemi Badenoch during Prime Minister's Questions.

== Personal life ==
Cartlidge is married to Emily Cartlidge (née Howarth), with whom he has four children. His father-in-law is former Conservative MP, Sir Gerald Howarth.

Parliament of the United Kingdom
Preceded by Tim Yeo	Member of Parliament for South Suffolk; 2015–present	Incumbent
