= Ecclesiastical Insurance =

British insurance company

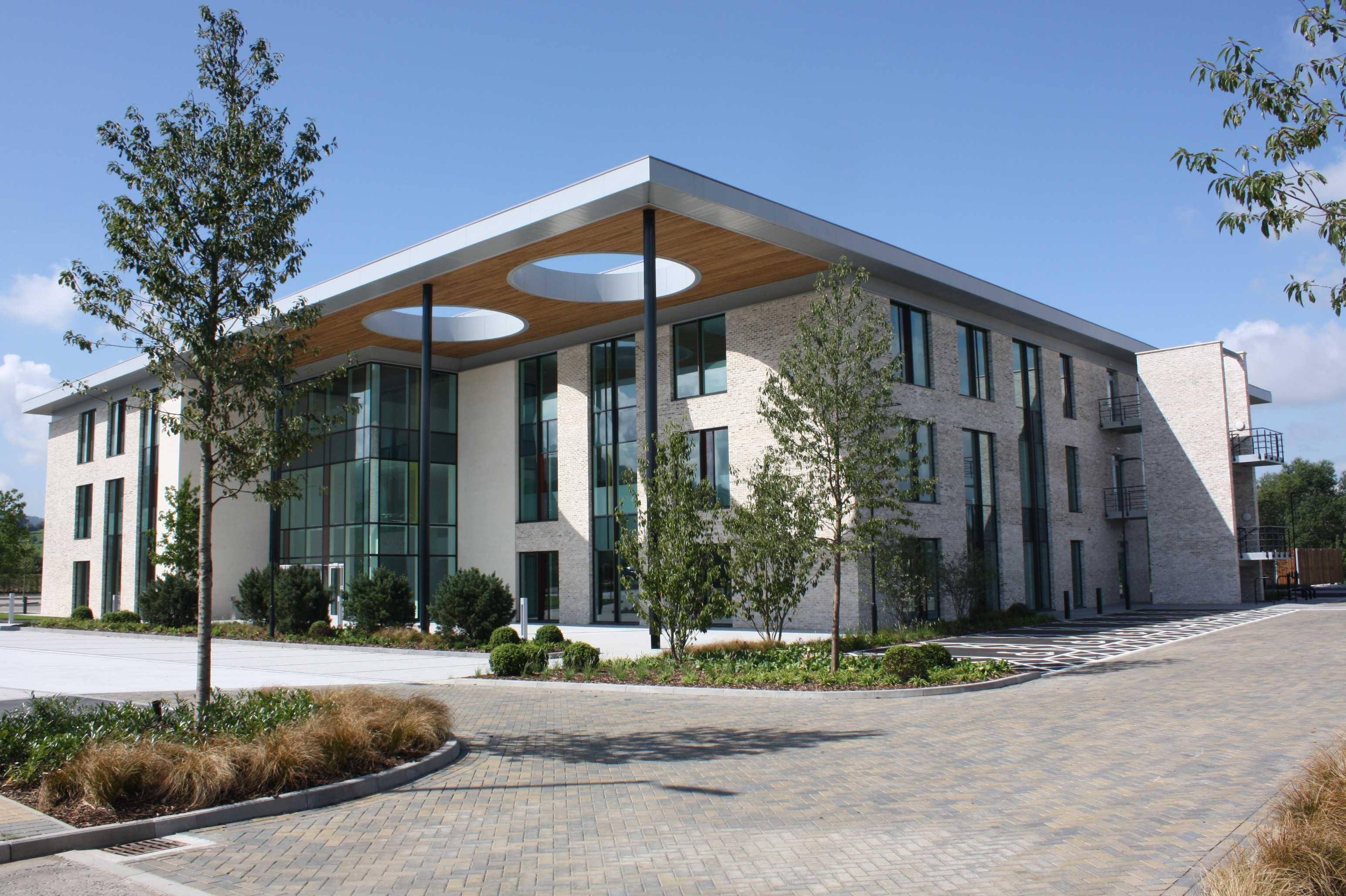
- Headquarters building in Gloucester, UK
- Formerly: Ecclesiastical Buildings Fire Office
- Industry: Financial Services
- Founded: 1887
- Founder: Dean Herbert Gregory and John Duncan
- Headquarters: Benefact House, Pioneer Avenue, Gloucester, UK
- Key people: Mark Hews (CEO)
- Products: Church Insurance; Charity Insurance; Heritage Insurance; Education Insurance
- Brands: Ecclesiastical Insurance Office; EdenTree Investment; Ansvar Insurance Lycetts
- Owner: Benefact Trust (previously known as Allchurches Trust)
- Parent: Benefact Group
- Website: ecclesiastical.com

Ecclesiastical Insurance is an insurance company in the United Kingdom founded in 1887. The head office is located in Gloucester.

The company is formally named Ecclesiastical Insurance Office plc and is authorised and regulated by the FCA and PRA. It is a wholly owned subsidiary of Benefact Group which in turn is owned by Benefact Trust (previously known as Allchurches Trust), a registered charity whose objectives are to promote the Christian religion and to provide funds for other charitable purposes. Ecclesiastical Insurance Office plc has over £100m Preference Shares listed on the London Stock Exchange.

It was established by the Church of England to provide insurance cover for its buildings. It now covers a wide range of insurance business, and in 2006 it ranked 16th in liability insurance and 20th in accident insurance based on UK Net Written Premiums.

Customers include Gloucester Cathedral and St Paul's Cathedral.

== History ==
In 1887, an independent business, the Ecclesiastical Buildings Fire Office, was founded by two MPs, three clergymen, a barrister and a clerk of the House of Lords and its directors comprised five clerics and five laymen. Two of the principal founders were Dean Herbert Gregory and John Duncan.

They were determined, after a series of high-profile fires had left parishes with ruined churches and no means of restoring them, that there should be a reliable fire insurance service for parishes in their time of need. One of the founding principles was to plough any profits back into charitable work.

In April 1894 the Company announced that it would add burglary and personal accident insurance to its business, and a year later, because it was no longer restricted to fire business, the company changed its name to Ecclesiastical Insurance Office.

In 1978, the company launched its first specialist policy for schools, now known as education insurance. This was at a time when schools were starting to have more responsibility for their own budgets and more equipment.

Ecclesiastical Insurance founded its investment management arm, Ecclesiastical Investment Management Limited, in 1988, and launched the UK's first socially responsible fund, the UK Amity fund. The investment management business rebranded to EdenTree in July 2015.

Ecclesiastical was awarded Chartered Insurer status for its entire UK operations by the Chartered Insurance Institute in 2013.

In 2015 the company moved its London operations from Billiter Street to new offices in Monument Place.

In 2016, Ecclesiastical celebrated a milestone of £50million donated to its charitable owner in under three years. This was celebrated by a special Thanksgiving service in Gloucester Cathedral at which a personal message of thanks from Archbishop Justin Welby was read out by Bishop Nigel Stock, honouring the achievement of the insurance group. Ecclesiastical has set itself a new target of reaching £100million for Allchurches Trust by 2020.

== Criticism ==
=== Elliott Review ===
In March 2016, Archbishop Welby's office and Bishop Paul Butler came under considerable criticism for having followed instruction from Ecclesiastical to end contact with a sex abuse survivor. According to the findings of Ian Elliott, who led an independent review of the Church's handling of the case, the instruction from Ecclesiastical was not only reckless but ran counter to the church's stated policies. The Archbishop of Canterbury's office ignored repeated calls for help from the man after staff were told to avoid contact with him to protect the Church of England's financial interests.

=== Church of England Bishops ===
In October 2017, Ecclesiastical received a letter from Bishops Paul Butler, Tim Thornton, and Alan Wilson criticising amongst other things: inconsistent advice to the Church and the practice of 'horse trade' legalism when dealing with CSA cases, with little concern for the impact upon survivors. The letter was copied to Justin Welby and John Sentamu, Archbishops of Canterbury and York, and to William Nye, Secretary General of the Church of England's Synod. The three bishops requested a meeting with Ecclesiastical to look at how the church and the insurer work together in relation to the difficulties in responding to survivors of child sex abuse. Ecclesiastical wrote a strong rebuttal of the letter and did not recognise the picture the bishops gave. Nor did they recognise the criticism previously made in the Elliott Review, which they had claimed in a previous statement on their website had a number of inaccuracies. Their main criticism of the Review was that they had not been given any input to the process of the Review and had been misrepresented. This conflict between the insurer and one of its main clients received considerable media attention.

=== Mandate Now ===
In March 2018, the pressure group Mandate Now released a critical analysis of the Church of England's safeguarding policy in which they questioned Ecclesiastical's possible involvement in formulating the policy “which for obvious reasons of conflict of interest ought not to be allowed”. They went on to say that the influence of Ecclesiastical seemed "omnipresent”, and that it appeared the Church's safeguarding officers might be required to gather information from survivors in order to defeat possible claims for damages.

Mandate Now's concerns were borne out in a statement to IICSA by Michael Angell on behalf of the insurer in 2018. His testimony included the statement that Ecclesiastical had been a regular participant in the Church of England Safeguarding Committee from the mid 1990s onwards. This committee made policy recommendations and issued safeguarding guidance within the Church. In 2000, the Church formed a joint safeguarding committee with the Methodist Church, which Ecclesiastical continued to attend. In 2012/13 the two churches returned to separate committees. Ecclesiastical has not attended either since 2015.

== See also ==
- Allchurches Trust
- EdenTree Investment
- Ansvar Insurance
- Lycetts
- IICSA
