= Benefact Trust =

National charity in the United Kingdom

Benefact Trust Limited
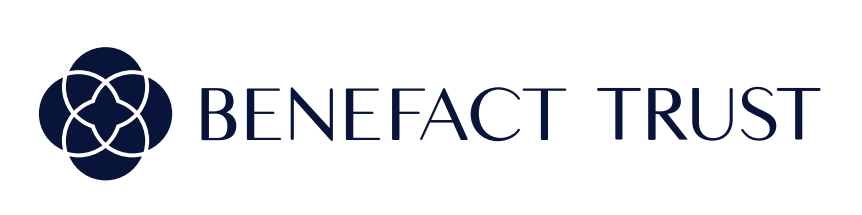
- Founded: 1972
- Founder: Ecclesiastical Insurance
- Type: Charitable Trust
- Registration no.: 1043742
- Purpose: "Benefact Trust exists to make a positive difference to people's lives by funding, guiding and celebrating the work of churches and Christian charities; empowering the most vulnerable and giving people, communities and places a renewed opportunity to flourish.".
- Location: Benefact House, 2000 Pioneer Avenue, Gloucester Business Park, Brockworth, Gloucester, GL3 4AW, United Kingdom
- Region served: UK, Ireland, Canada, Australia
- Key people: Tim Carroll (Chair)
- Subsidiaries: Ecclesiastical Insurance, EdenTree Investment
- Revenue: £50million (2014-2016)
- Website: https://benefacttrust.co.uk/
- Formerly called: Allchurches Trust

Benefact Trust (previously the Allchurches Trust) is a large national charity in the United Kingdom, established in 1972. It is headquartered in Gloucester. It is an independent registered charity. Its objects are to "make a positive difference to people's lives by funding, guiding and celebrating the work of churches and Christian charities; empowering the most vulnerable and giving people, communities and places a renewed opportunity to flourish." Initially, most of its grants were for the repair and maintenance of church buildings. Now it also supports projects that more widely benefit local communities and reflect changes in society.

== History ==
The trust was set up to act as the beneficial owner of the insurance company Ecclesiastical Insurance. Founded by two MP's, three clergymen, a barrister, a clerk of the House of Lords and its directors—five clerics and five laymen, Ecclesiastical provided a reliable insurance service for parishes in times of struggle.

As the scope of the business, profits and grant-making increased, it was decided in 1972 that Ecclesiastical's ownership should be transferred to a separate independent charity, hence the formation of Benefact Trust (formerly Allchurches Trust). To this day the Trust continues to award grants to good causes with all available profits from the Benefact Group and the specialist financial businesses that sit within it.

== Governance ==
It is a registered charity under the name Benefact Trust Limited and its objects are to promote the Christian religion and to provide funds for other charitable purposes. The charity is governed by a board of trustees who set its strategic direction and ensure it meets its goals and objectives. The current chair is Tim Carroll.

== Income ==
It does not fundraise; it derives its funds solely from the business it owns, Ecclesiastical Insurance and the subsidiary EdenTree Investment, which passes on to Benefact Trust a significant proportion of profits. In 2015, Benefact Trust received £23m from Ecclesiastical Insurance, enabling the trust to give £11.7m in grants to the Church of England dioceses, other Anglican denominations and other charitable projects.

A 2016 Thanksgiving service in Gloucester Cathedral marked the donation within three years of £50million to the trust from Ecclesiastical Insurance and its subsidiary. A personal message of thanks from Archbishop Justin Welby was read out by Bishop Nigel Stock, the Bishop at Lambeth and chair of the trust at the time. Ecclesiastical Insurance has set itself a new target of providing £100million for Benefact Trust by 2020.

== Criticism ==
In 2017, survivors of church abuse criticised the nexus of corporate ties between Allchurches Trust, Ecclesiastical Insurance, and the Church of England. Ecclesiastical was founded in 1887 by the Church of England to conserve the profits of the insurer for itself. Since the 1970s, its profits have been paid to Allchurches Trust, which makes substantial block grants to dioceses and cathedrals in addition to grants to many parishes. The nexus has been accused of resisting and restricting financial settlements because it is too closely affiliated with the Church itself. Research carried out in Companies House revealed the extent of these grants. It has been estimated that between 2014 and 2020 the Church of England will receive in the region of £100 million via Allchurches Trust. The search for information on Companies House also revealed that in addition to the senior church figures who have been trustees of the trust, numerous bishops and cathedral deans have been directors on the board of Ecclesiastical itself. In July 2017, a BBC Victoria Derbyshire programme commented that the insurer "has had a string of senior members of clergy on its board of directors."

Keith Porteous Wood, chair of the National Secular Society, commented

They sit in a non-executive capacity despite being experts neither on insurance nor, as far as we are aware, on any other corporate area. The question is: why are they there and what effect does their presence have on payouts to abuse victims? EIG (Ecclesiastical) failed in the TV programme to justify the CofE clerics' presence on its board. It claimed it was "normal business practice because the Church of England was one of its major customers". This ruse fails closer examination. It is not normal practice for companies to invite representatives of major customers (perhaps in competition with each other) onto their boards, if for no other reason than that those so invited would become privy to commercial secrets and sensitive intelligence that could then be used to the detriment of the supplier or competitor. Clearly there has to be another reason. Let us not forget the massive grant; the Church of England certainly has a vested interest – the smaller the abuse settlements are, the greater the grant they will receive.

== See also ==
- Church Commissioners
- Churches Conservation Trust
- National Churches Trust
