= Kathryn Hudson =

5th Parliamentary Commissioner for Standards
- Appointed by: House of Commons Commission
- Succeeded by: Kathryn Stone OBE

Personal details
- Born: Kathryn Margaret Hudson; 28 March 1949
- As of 7 October 2018

Kathryn Margaret Hudson (born 28 March 1949) was the Parliamentary Commissioner for Standards for the United Kingdom House of Commons. Appointed in September 2012, she served until 31 December 2017.

She was previously (from 2008) Deputy Parliamentary and Health Service Ombudsman. From 2004 to 2008 she was National Director for Social Care at the Department of Health.
