= Daniel Greenberg (lawyer) =

British barrister, Parliamentary counsel, and legal writer

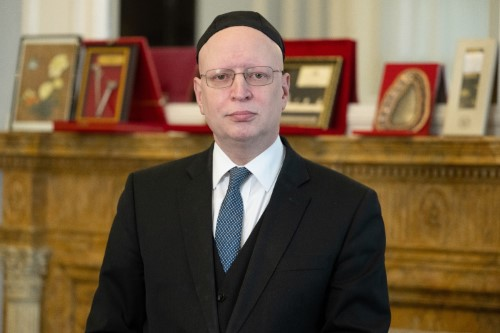

Parliamentary Commissioner for Standards
- Incumbent
- Assumed office 1 January 2023
- Preceded by: Kathryn Stone

Personal details
- Born: Golders Green, London, England

Daniel Isaac Greenberg CB (born 5 September 1965) is a lawyer that has been the Parliamentary Commissioner for Standards since January 2023.

== Biography ==
Daniel Greenberg was born in Golders Green, Northwest London and grew up in an Orthodox Jewish community. He was educated at Trinity College, Cambridge, and the Inns of Court School of Law.

His early career included time working in the Lord Chancellor's Department, the Office of the Parliamentary Counsel, and the Office of Speaker's Counsel. He recently served as counsel for domestic legislation in the House of Commons.

He has also served as editor of Stroud's Judicial Dictionary (2000–2016) and Craies on Legislation (2004–2016), general editor of Jowitt's Dictionary of English Law (2010–2015) and the Annotated Statutes and Insight Encyclopaedia, editor-in-chief of the Statute Law Review (2012), and contributing consultant editor to the Oxford English Dictionary.

Greenberg was appointed Companion of the Order of the Bath in the 2021 New Year Honours for services to Parliament.

In January 2021, he wrote an editorial in The Jewish Chronicle criticising some Haredi Jewish groups for not following COVID-19 restrictions, in which he suggests that "any community that tolerates [benefit fraud, covering up abuse, and breaking public health law] has no connection with Jewish law or values and has become simply a self-indulgent and dangerous sect".

== Bibliography ==
- How to Become Jewish (And Why Not To). Guildford: Grosvenor House. 2009. ISBN 978-1-906645-96-0.
- Laying Down the Law: A Discussion of the People, Processes and Problems that Shape Acts of Parliament. London: Sweet & Maxwell. 2011. ISBN 978-0-414-04693-1.
- Statutes and Legislative Process. Halsbury's Laws of England. Vol. 96. London: LexisNexis. 2012. ISBN 978-1-4743-0957-8.
- What If God's a Christian? An Orthodox But Sceptical Jewish View of the World. Tolworth: Grosvenor House. 2017. ISBN 978-1-78623-978-5.
- Legislating for Wales. Cardiff: University of Wales Press. 2018. ISBN 978-1-78683-300-6. With Thomas Glyn Watkin.
- A Tale of Two Rabbis - Faith and Fraud. 2020. ISBN 979-8558704297.
- Getting A Get. 2022. ISBN 979-8841609940.
