= Ministry of Justice (United Kingdom) =

Ministerial department of the UK Government

Ministry of Justice Y Weinyddiaeth Gyfiawnder (Welsh)

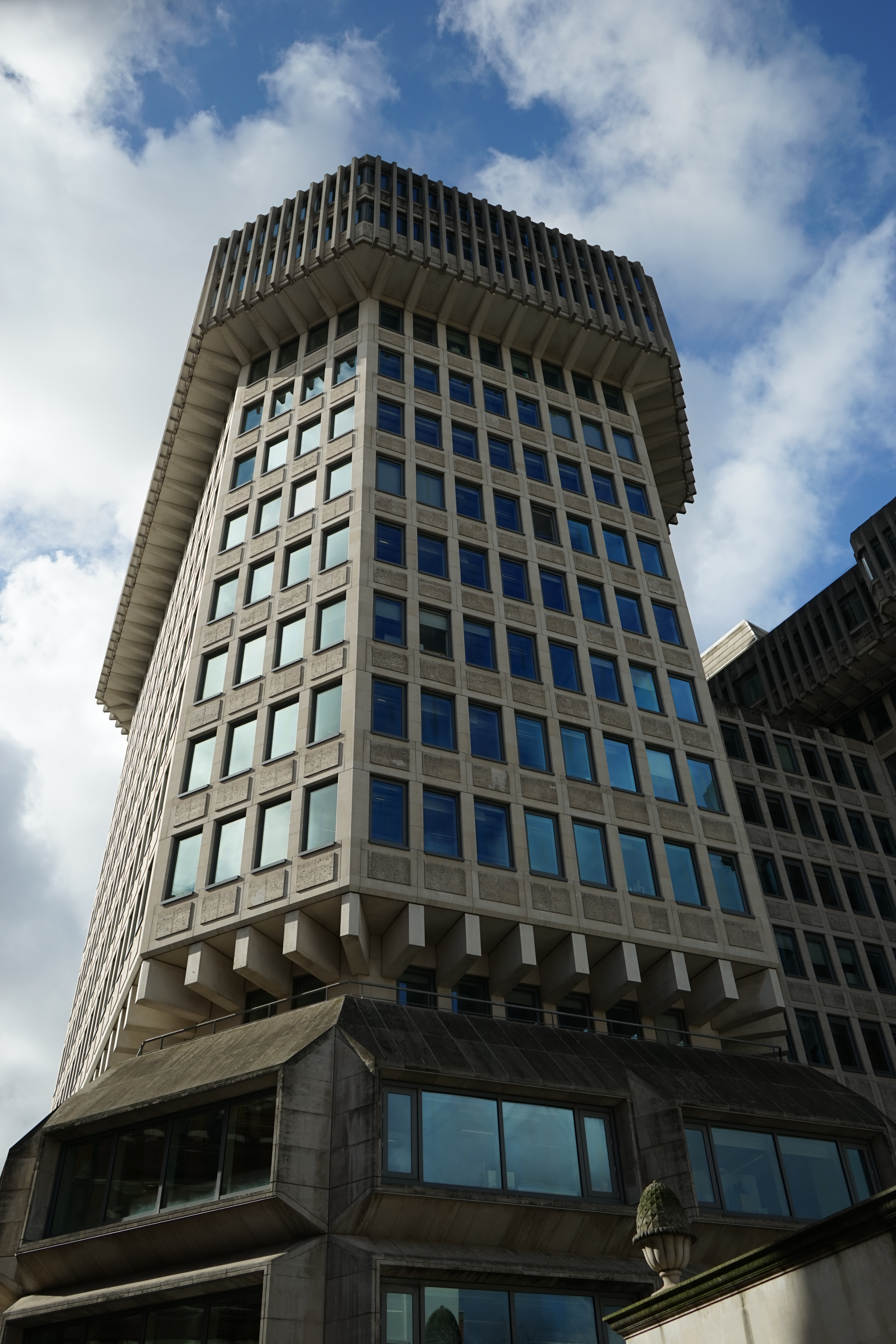
- 102 Petty France, Westminster

Ministerial Department overview
- Formed: 9 May 2007
- Preceding Ministerial Department: Department for Constitutional Affairs
- Jurisdiction: Government of the United Kingdom; England and Wales; United Kingdom (partly)
- Headquarters: 102 Petty France, London
- Employees: More than 77,000
- Annual budget: £6.3 billion & £600 million capital expenditure in 2018–19
- Secretary of State responsible: Alex Norris MP, Lord Chancellor and Secretary of State for Justice
- Ministerial Department executive: Jo Farrar, Permanent Secretary and Clerk of the Crown in Chancery
- Child agencies: Criminal Injuries Compensation Authority; His Majesty's Courts and Tribunals Service; Legal Aid Agency; HM Prison and Probation Service; Office of the Public Guardian; Wales Office; Scotland Office
- Website: gov.uk/moj

- Applies to: England and Wales; United Kingdom (some reserved matters)

Other UK counterparts
- Northern Ireland: Department of Justice
- Scotland: Education and Justice Directorates

The Ministry of Justice (MoJ) is a ministerial department of the Government of the United Kingdom. It is headed by the Secretary of State for Justice, an office held concurrently by the Lord Chancellor. Its stated priorities are to reduce re-offending and protect the public, to provide access to justice, to increase confidence in the justice system, and to uphold people's civil liberties. The Secretary of State is the minister responsible to Parliament for the judiciary, the court system, prisons, and probation in England and Wales, with some additional UK-wide responsibilities, e.g., the UK Supreme Court and judicial appointments by the Crown. The department is also responsible for areas of constitutional policy not transferred in 2010 to the Deputy Prime Minister, human rights law, and information rights law across the UK.

The Ministry of Justice is responsible for managing the UK's constitutional relationship with Jersey, Guernsey, and the Isle of Man (which are Crown Dependencies). The Ministry of Justice provides Justice support for the British Overseas Territories). Gibraltar, another British overseas territory, has its own Ministry of Justice.

The ministry was formed on 9 May 2007 when some functions of the Home Secretary were combined with the Department for Constitutional Affairs. The latter had replaced the Lord Chancellor's Department in 2003.

The expenditure, administration, and policy of the Ministry of Justice are scrutinised by the Justice Select Committee.

== Responsibilities ==
=== UK-wide ===
Prior to the formation of the Coalition Government in May 2010, the ministry handled relations between the British Government and the three devolved administrations: the Northern Ireland Executive; the Scottish Government; and the Welsh Government.

Responsibility for devolution was then transferred to the re-established position of Deputy Prime Minister, based in the Cabinet Office. He also assumed responsibility for political and constitutional reform, including reform of the House of Lords, the West Lothian Question, electoral policy, political party funding reform and royal succession.

After 2015, responsibility for devolution was transferred back to the ministry as well as the three offices for Scotland, Wales and Northern Ireland until 2019 when it was transferred to the Minister for the Union in the Prime Minister's Office. Reform of the House of Lords was given to the Leader of the House of Lords and the Cabinet Office. The West Lothian Question was given to the Leader of the House of Commons as was electoral policy and political party funding reform which is now handled by the Speakers Committee on Electoral Reform and the House Leader. Royal succession was given back to the ministry.

The Secretary of State for Justice had responsibility for a commission on a British bill of rights. The British bill of rights was a plan to implement human rights through national law, instead of the European Convention on Human Rights being part of UK law through the Human Rights Act 1998. This would have also ended the binding authority the European Court of Human Rights has over British courts. This was later shelved, but recently, this has gained support since the UK left the European Union.

The Ministry of Justice retained the following UK-wide remit:

- European Union and international justice policy
- Freedom of information and data protection
- Human rights and civil liberties
- The Supreme Court of the United Kingdom
- The National Archives

As the office of the Lord High Chancellor of Great Britain, the ministry is also responsible for policy relating to Lord Lieutenants (i.e. the personal representatives of the King), "non-delegated" royal, church and hereditary issues, and other constitutional issues, although the exact definition of these is unclear.

The post of Lord Chancellor of Ireland was abolished in 1922 though Northern Ireland remains part of the UK. The authority of the Lord Chancellor of Ireland was transferred to the Secretary of State for Northern Ireland.

=== England and Wales only ===
The vast majority of the Ministry of Justice's work takes place in England and Wales. The ministry has no responsibility for devolved criminal justice policy, courts, prisons or probation matters in either Scotland or Northern Ireland.

Within the jurisdiction of England and Wales, the Ministry of Justice is responsible for ensuring that all suspected offenders (including children and young people) are appropriately dealt with from the time they are arrested, until convicted offenders have completed their sentence. The ministry is therefore responsible for all aspects of the criminal law, including the scope and content of criminal offences. Its responsibilities extend to the commissioning of prison services (through the National Offender Management Service), rehabilitation and reducing offending, victim support, the probation service and the out-of-court system, the Youth Justice Board, sentencing and parole policy, criminal injuries compensation and the Criminal Cases Review Commission. The Attorney General for England and Wales (also the Advocate General for Northern Ireland) works with the Ministry of Justice to develop criminal justice policy.

Other responsibilities limited to England and Wales include the administration of all courts and tribunals, management of the prisoner escort and custody services contracts, land registration, legal aid and the regulation of legal services, coroners and the investigation of deaths, administrative justice and public law, the maintenance of the judiciary, public guardianship and mental incapacity, supervision of restricted patients detained under the Mental Health Act 1983 and civil law and justice, including the family justice system and claims management regulation.

=== Crown dependencies ===
The Ministry of Justice is the department that facilitates communication between the Crown dependencies i.e. Jersey, Guernsey and the Isle of Man, and HM Government. These are self-governing possessions of the British monarch, through his titles as Duke of Normandy in the Channel Islands and Lord of Mann in the Isle of Man.

It processes legislation for Royal Assent passed by the insular legislative assemblies and consults the Islands on extending UK legislation to them. It also ensures that relevant UK legislation is extended to the islands smoothly.

== Ministers ==
The Ministers in the Ministry of Justice are as follows, with cabinet ministers in bold:

Minister	Portrait	Office	Portfolio
**Alex Norris** MP		Lord Chancellor and Secretary of State for Justice	Oversight of cross-cutting emergency issues, responses supported by other ministers according to portfolio; Oversight of international business and future relations with the EU; MoJ support for the Union; Resourcing of the department; Functions of the Lord Chancellor; Judicial policy including pay, pensions and diversity (these and other operational decisions affecting the judiciary are reserved to the Lord Chancellor); Corporate services
Catherine McKinnell MP		Minister of State for Prisons, Probation and Reducing Reoffending	Prison capacity and related policy; Prison operations policy, reform, industrial relations and workforce; Probation policy, operations, industrial relations, and transparency; His Majesty’s Prison and Probation; Service administration; Sentencing Act implementation; Dame Lynne Owen Review into Release in Error; Public Protection (incl. Critical Public Protection Cases); Parole Policy; Trans Prisoners; Female Offenders; Reducing Reoffending; Electronic Monitoring(EM); Offender health and drugs; Prisoner; Escort Contracts; Counter Terrorism; Amber Rudd Independent Review
Sarah Sackman MP		Minister of State for Courts and Legal Services	Criminal courts policy; Courts and Tribunals Bill; Legal Aid; Legal Aid Agency administration; Legal Support and Dispute Resolution; Legal Services; His Majesty’s Courts and Tribunals Service administration; Magistrates Policy; Open Justice; Tribunals Policy (incl. fees); Judicial Review; Civil Justice; Terminally Ill Adults (End of Life) Bill (Assisted Dying)
Alex Davies-Jones MP		Parliamentary Under-Secretary of State for Victims, Violence Against Women and Girls and International Justice	Violence Against Women and Girls (VAWG); Criminal Law; Victims, Witnesses and Vulnerabilities; Criminal Injuries Compensation Authority; Rape and Serious Sexual Offences (RASSO); Hillsborough Law; Death Management, Inquiries and Coroners; Probate (excluding fees); Miscarriages of Justice; Criminal Cases Review Commission; International Justice (including Private International Law and Rule of Law); Devolution and the Union
Gerard Lemos, Baron Lemos		Parliamentary Under-Secretary of State and Lords Minister	All Lords Business; Cross-cutting CJS Strategy
Jake Richards MP		Parliamentary Under-Secretary of State for Sentencing, Human Rights and Technology	Sentencing Policy (including Sentencing Act Implementation); Youth Justice policy; Youth Custody operations; Men and Boys; Irregular Migration (incl. Immigration Tribunal); Human Rights and ECHR; Foreign National Offenders; Prisoner Transfer Agreements; Children of Prisoners; Family Justice; Mental Capacity; Office for the Public Guardian administration; Crown Dependencies and Overseas Territories; Artificial Intelligence, cyber and tech; Cross-cutting corporate portfolio (including sustainability); Transparency and FOI; SI Minister

The permanent secretary at the Ministry of Justice is Jo Farrar, who is by virtue of her office also Clerk of the Crown in Chancery.

== See also ==
- Government of the United Kingdom
- Politics of the United Kingdom
