= Parliamentary Commissioner for Standards =

Officer of the UK House of Commons

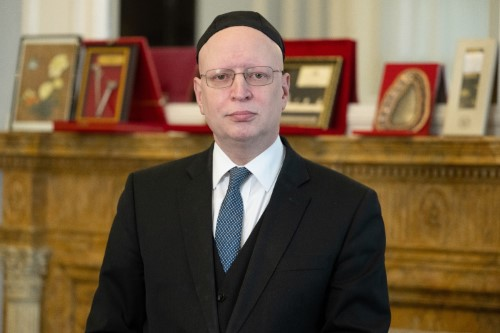
- Incumbent; Daniel Greenberg since 1 January 2023
- Type: Commissioner
- Reports to: Parliament of the United Kingdom
- Appointer: Commons Select Committee on Standards
- First holder: Gordon Downey
- Website: www.parliament.uk/mps-lords-and-offices/standards-and-financial-interests/parliamentary-commissioner-for-standards/

The Parliamentary Commissioner for Standards is an officer of the British House of Commons. The work of the officer is overseen by the Commons Select Committee on Standards.

The current commissioner is Daniel Greenberg.

== Duties ==
The commissioner is in charge of regulating MPs' conduct and propriety. One of the commissioner's main tasks is overseeing the Register of Members' Financial Interests, which is intended to ensure disclosure of financial interests that may be of relevance to MPs' work.

The Commissioner is the decision-maker in cases from the Independent Complaints and Grievance Scheme where the respondent is a Member of Parliament. If the Commissioner deems a sanction warranted, they refer cases to the Independent Expert Panel so the appropriate sanction can be determined.

The Parliamentary Commissioner for Standards is appointed by a resolution of the House of Commons for a fixed term of five years and is an independent officer of the House, working a four-day week. The remit of the Parliamentary Commissioner for Standards does not extend to the House of Lords: the post of Lords Commissioner for Standards was created in 2010.

== History ==
The post was established in 1995 with Sir Gordon Downey as the first commissioner, serving the newly formed Committee for Standards and Privileges. He investigated the cash-for-questions affair.

The second commissioner was Elizabeth Filkin (1999–2002), whose first case involved Peter Mandelson and a large loan which he had failed to declare in the Register of Members' Interests. Her departure was controversial.

The next commissioner was Sir Philip Mawer. MPs he investigated include George Galloway and Derek Conway. He avoided investigating high-level MPs such as cabinet ministers. Unlike his predecessor he was appointed to a second term, but he did not complete it; he took up a new post at the beginning of 2008 as an independent adviser on ministerial standards to the then prime minister Gordon Brown.

John Lyon was commissioner from 1 January 2008 to 31 December 2012. Kathryn Hudson served as commissioner from 1 January 2013 until 31 December 2017. Kathryn Stone served as commissioner from 1 January 2018 until 31 December 2022.

The current commissioner, Daniel Greenberg, began his tenure on 1 January 2023.

== List of commissioners ==
Parliamentary Commissioner for Standards
Commissioner		Term of Office
1	Sir Gordon Downey	1995–1999
2	Elizabeth Filkin	1999–2002
3	Sir Philip Mawer	2002–2008
4	John Lyon	1 January 2008 – 31 December 2012
5	Kathryn Hudson	1 January 2013 – 31 December 2017
6	Kathryn Stone	1 January 2018 – 31 December 2022
7	Daniel Greenberg	1 January 2023 – Incumbent
