= Social Democratic Federation election results =

UK political party election results

This article lists the Social Democratic Federation's election results in UK parliamentary elections. It also includes the results of its successor, the British Socialist Party.

== Summary of general election performance ==
Year	Number of Candidates	Total votes	Average voters per candidate	Percentage of vote	Saved deposits	Change (%)	Number of MPs
1885	3	657	219	0.0	N/A	N/A	0
1886	0	N/A	N/A	N/A	N/A	N/A	0
1892	2	659	330	0.0	N/A	N/A	0
1895	4	3,730	933	0.1	N/A	+0.1	0
1900	2	6,997	3,499	0.2	N/A	+0.1	0
1906	8	18,446	2,310	0.4	N/A	+0.2	0
Jan 1910	9	13,479	1,498	0.2	N/A	-0.2	0
Dec 1910	2	5,733	2,867	0.1	N/A	-0.1	0
1918	16	71,762	4,485	0.7	13	+0.6	0

== Elections results ==
=== 1885 general election ===
Constituency	Candidate	Votes	%	Position
Hampstead	Jack Williams	27	0.6	3
Kennington	John Fielding	32	0.5	3
Nottingham West	John Burns	598	5.4	3

=== 1892 general election ===
Constituency	Candidate	Votes	%	Position
Bethnal Green North East	Hugh Robert Taylor	106	2.0	3
Salford South	William Knight Hall	553	7.5	3

=== By-elections, 1892–1895 ===
By-election	Candidate	Votes	%	Position
1895 Walworth by-election	George Lansbury	347	6.8	3

=== 1895 general election ===
Constituency	Candidate	Votes	%	Position
Burnley	H. M. Hyndman	1,498	12.4	3
Northampton	Frederick George Jones	1,216	6.7	5
Salford South	Henry William Hobart	813	10.8	3
Walworth	George Lansbury	203	3.8	3

=== By-elections, 1895–1900 ===
By-election	Candidate	Votes	%	Position
1896 Southampton by-election	C. A. Gibson	274	2.4	
1898 Reading by-election	Harry Quelch	270	3.1	

=== 1900 general election ===
Constituency	Candidate	Votes	%	Position
Bow and Bromley	George Lansbury	2,558	36.7	2
West Ham South	Will Thorne	4,439	44.2	2

For the 1900 general election, the Social Democratic Federation stood candidates as part of the Labour Representation Committee.

=== By-elections, 1900–1906 ===
By-election	Candidate	Votes	%	Position
1902 Dewsbury by-election	Harry Quelch	1,597	13.6	3

=== 1906 general election ===
Constituency	Candidate	Votes	%	Position
Aberdeen North	Tom Kennedy	1,935	25.1	2
Accrington	Dan Irving	4,852	38.3	2
Bradford East	Edward Hartley	3,090	22.8	3
Burnley	H. M. Hyndman	4,932	32.5	3
Camborne	Jack Jones	109	1.5	3
Northampton	James Gribble	2,366	10.9	6
Northampton	Jack Williams	2,544	11.7	5
Southampton	Harry Quelch	2,146	8.0	5

=== By-elections, 1906–1910 ===
By-election	Candidate	Votes	%	Position
1908 Manchester North West by-election	Dan Irving	276	2.6	3
1908 Haggerston by-election	Herbert Burrows	986	17.7	3
1908 Newcastle-upon-Tyne by-election	Edward Hartley	2,971	10.4	3

=== January 1910 general election ===
Constituency	Candidate	Votes	%	Position
Aberdeen North	Tom Kennedy	1,344	16.9	3
Bradford East	Edward Hartley	1,740	12.0	3
Burnley	H. M. Hyndman	4,948	30.2	3
Carlisle	Arthur Charles Bannington	777	11.3	3
Haggerston	Herbert Burrows	701	11.1	3
Northampton	James Gribble	1,792	7.7	5
Northampton	Harry Quelch	1,617	7.0	6
Rochdale	Dan Irving	1,755	12.6	3
Sheffield Brightside	Charles Lapworth	510	4.7	3

=== December 1910 general election ===
Constituency	Candidate	Votes	%	Position
Burnley	H. M. Hyndman	3,810	23.8	3
Rochdale	Dan Irving	1,901	14.5	3

=== By-elections, 1910–1918 ===
By-election	Candidate	Votes	%	Position
1913 Leicester by-election	Edward Hartley	2,580	11.4	3
1913 Reading by-election	Joseph George Butler	1,063	10.4	3
1914 Poplar by-election	Jack Jones	893	11.6	3

The Social Democratic Party merged into the British Socialist Party in 1911. Hartley was endorsed by the Labour Party.

=== 1918 general election ===
Constituency	Candidate	Votes	%	Position
Bradford South	William Hirst	8,291	30.9	2
Edmonton	Frank Broad	3,575	25.7	2
Glasgow Gorbals	John Maclean	7,436	34.3	2
Glasgow Tradeston	James D. MacDougall	3,751	19.4	2
Great Yarmouth	William McConnell	1,845	12.8	3
Greenock	Fred Shaw	2,542	11.2	3
Grimsby	Charles E. Franklin	9,015	33.7	2
Hastings	Joseph George Butler	3,556	24.1	2
Islington North	John Arnall	4,000	19.3	2
Motherwell	Walton Newbold	4,135	23.2	3
Portsmouth Central	Hugh Hinshelwood	4,004	19.1	3
Salford South	James Gorman	3,807	19.0	2
Sheffield Central	Robert George Murray	643	4.0	3
Sheffield Park	Alf Barton	3,167	20.4	2
Southampton	Tommy Lewis	7,828	10.6	4
Walthamstow West	Valentine McEntee	4,167	29.3	2

All candidates other than Arnall, Hirst and Murray stood for the Labour Party. Hirst stood for the Co-operative Party.
