= 1908 Newcastle-upon-Tyne by-election =

UK parliamentary by-election

← 1906	25 September 1908	Jan. 1910 →

Candidate	Renwick	Shortt	Hartley
Party	Conservative	Liberal	Social Democratic Federation
Popular vote	13,863	11,720	2,971
Percentage	48.5%	41.1%	10.4%
MP before election
Thomas Cairns
Liberal
Subsequent MP
Edward Shortt
Liberal

The 1908 Newcastle-upon-Tyne by-election was a Parliamentary by-election held on 25 September 1908. The constituency returned two Members of Parliament (MP) to the House of Commons of the United Kingdom, elected by the first past the post voting system.

== Vacancy ==
Thomas Cairns had been Liberal MP for the seat of Newcastle-upon-Tyne since the 1906 general election. He died on 3 September 1908.

== Electoral history ==
The seat had been Liberal since they gained it in 1906;

General election January 1906
Party	Candidate	Votes	%	±%
Labour Repr. Cmte.	✓ Walter Hudson	18,869	31.1	New
Liberal	✓ Thomas Cairns	18,423	30.5	+9.8
Conservative	Walter Richard Plummer	11,942	19.8	−9.9
Conservative	George Renwick	11,223	18.6	−10.4
Majority		6,927	11.3	N/A
Labour Repr. Cmte. gain from Conservative		Swing		
Majority		6,481	10.7	N/A
Liberal gain from Conservative		Swing	+9.9	
Turnout		50,457	84.6	+10.5

== Candidates ==
Edward Shortt

The local Liberal Association selected 46-year-old Edward Shortt to defend the seat. The son of a Newcastle upon Tyne Church of England vicar, he was called to the Bar at the Middle Temple in 1890 and practised on the North Eastern Circuit. He had served as Recorder (part-time judge) of Sunderland since 1907.

The Conservatives retained 58-year-old George Renwick as their candidate. Renwick was elected to Parliament in 1900 as Conservative member for Newcastle-upon-Tyne, serving from 1900 until his defeat in 1906. Renwick was born in Newcastle upon Tyne. He joined shipowners Pyman, Bell & Co as a clerk and then co-founded his own business, Fisher, Renwick & Co. He had particularly large interests in drydocks, including the world's first ever floating repair docks, the Tyne Pontoons at Wallsend, which he sold to Swan Hunter & Wigham Richardson Ltd in 1903.

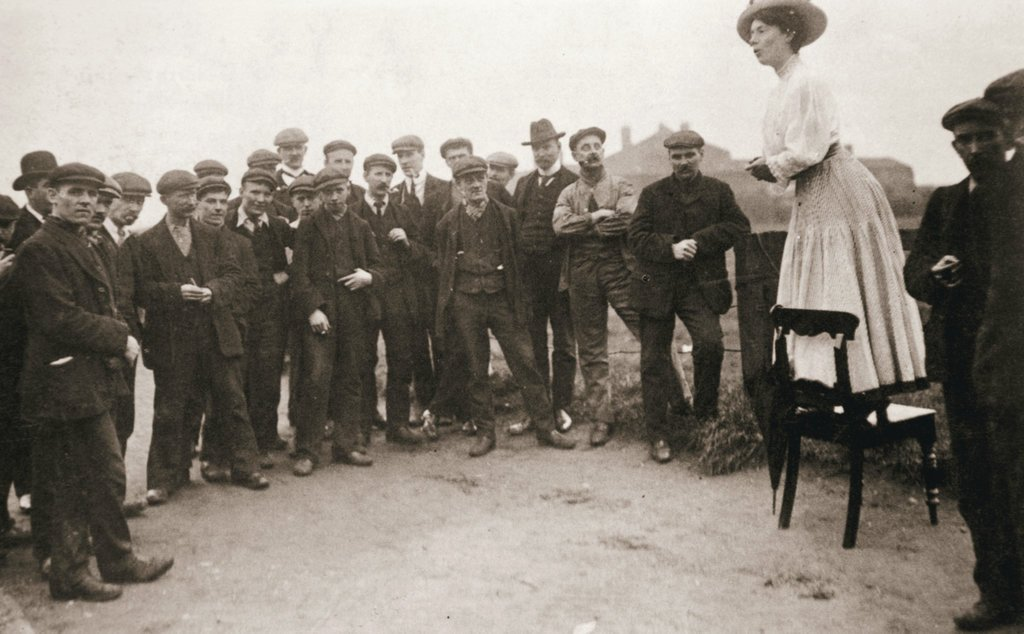
Una Duval, suffragette, campaigning at the by-election

The Newcastle Independent Labour Party selected J. J. Stephenson as a candidate. This was in conflict with the electoral alliance that had existed between the Liberal and Labour parties. However, the Labour Party National Executive persuaded the Labour candidate to withdraw. The Social Democratic Federation, with the support of some local Independent Labour Party branches, then nominated their own candidate, 53-year-old Bradford man, Edward Hartley. Hartley had fought Bradford East at the last general election, finishing third. Before that he had fought Dewsbury at the 1895 general election and then the 1902 Dewsbury by-election.

== Campaign ==
Polling day was fixed for the 25 September 1908, just 22 days after the death of the previous MP.

The constituency included at least 2,000 Irish voters, mainly Roman Catholics, who could normally be relied upon to vote Liberal. However, the Liberals banned the carrying of the Host in the Eucharistic Congress Procession in London earlier in the month, which was expected to cost them votes in Newcastle.

The SDF candidate antagonised the ILP and the local suffragists by refusing to pledge himself to oppose any future franchise reform restricted to manhood suffrage.

== Result ==
The Conservatives gained the seat;

Newcastle-upon-Tyne by-election, 1908
Party	Candidate	Votes	%	±%
Conservative	George Renwick	13,863	48.5	+7.1
Liberal	Edward Shortt	11,720	41.1	+10.6
Social Democratic Federation	Edward Hartley	2,971	10.4	New
Majority		2,143	7.4	N/A
Turnout		28,554	76.4	−8.2
Conservative gain from Liberal		Swing	-1.8	

== Aftermath ==
Shortt re-gained the seat from Renwick at the following general election. Hartley returned to Bradford where he was again defeated at Bradford East;

General election January 1910
Party	Candidate	Votes	%	±%
Liberal	✓ Edward Shortt	18,779	28.9	−1.6
Labour	✓ Walter Hudson	18,241	28.0	−3.1
Conservative	Walter Richard Plummer	14,067	21.6	+1.8
Conservative	George Renwick	13,928	21.4	+2.8
Majority		4,712	7.3	N/A
Liberal gain from Conservative		Swing	-1.7	
Majority		4,313	6.6	−4.7
Labour hold		Swing	-2.9	
Turnout		65,015	86.1	+1.5
