= Runciman Report (1938) =

The Runciman Report was issued at the conclusion of Lord Runciman's Mission to Czechoslovakia in September 1938. The purpose of the Mission was to mediate in a dispute between the Government of Czechoslovakia and the Sudeten German Party (SdP), representing German separatists within Czechoslovakia (in the so-called "Sudetenland"), which was threatening to plunge Europe into war.

The report, published in the form of letters addressed to the British prime minister, Neville Chamberlain and the Czechoslovak President, Edvard Beneš, on 21 September 1938, recommended the cession of the territory concerned to Nazi Germany, thus paving the way for the Munich Agreement of 30 September 1938.

Evidence suggests that a section of the report was redrafted at a late stage, probably by Frank Ashton-Gwatkin, the Chief of Staff of the Mission and a permanent official in the British Foreign Office, in order to bring the recommendations fully into line with British policy.
