= 1888 Dewsbury by-election =

1888 House of Commons By-election

- 14 November 1888
Candidate	Oldroyd	Arnold-Forster
Party	Liberal	Liberal Unionist
Popular vote	6,071	3,969
Percentage	60.5%	39.5%
MP before election
Sir John Simon
Liberal
Subsequent MP
Mark Oldroyd
Liberal

The 1888 Dewsbury by-election was a by-election held in England on 14 November 1888 for the UK House of Commons constituency of Dewsbury in the West Riding of Yorkshire.

== Vacancy ==
The by-election was caused by the resignation of the sitting Liberal Member of Parliament (MP), Sir John Simon. On 8 November 1888 it was announced that he had taken the office of Steward of the Chiltern Hundreds, thus resigning from the Commons. On the following day the writ for the by-election was moved in the House of Commons by Arnold Morley, Liberal MP for Nottingham East. The writ was received by the mayor of Dewsbury, returning officer for the election, on the 10 November. He fixed the deadline for nominations for Wednesday 14 November and polling day for Friday 16 November.

== Seat ==
The Parliamentary Borough of Dewsbury formed part of the West Riding of Yorkshire. As well as Dewsbury itself, the constituency contained four other townships, with a total electorate of nearly 12,000 as follows:

- Dewsbury - 4,840
- Batley - 4,340
- Soothill - 989
- Mirfield - 817
- Thornhill - 791
- TOTAL - 11,797

== Candidates ==
The by-election came only two years after the split in the Liberal Party, with those opposed to Irish Home Rule forming the Liberal Unionist Party.

Although it was originally reported that there were 'four candidates in the field' only two were nominated.

First to be nominated was the Liberal candidate, Mark Oldroyd. Oldroyd was the outgoing Mayor of Dewsbury and launched his campaign at a Primitive Methodist schoolroom in Westborough speaking in favour of Home Rule.

The second candidate in the field was H. O. Arnold-Forster, for the Liberal Unionists. This was his third attempt to win a seat in the Commons.

== Result ==
Oldroyd held the seat for the Liberals with a reduced majority.

1888 Dewsbury by-election
Party	Candidate	Votes	%	±%
Liberal	Mark Oldroyd	6,071	60.5	−4.5
Liberal Unionist	H. O. Arnold-Forster	3,969	39.5	+4.5
Majority		2,102	21.0	−9.0
Turnout		10,040	85.3	+16.4
Registered electors		11,767		
Liberal hold		Swing	−4.5	
