= Thomas Cairns =

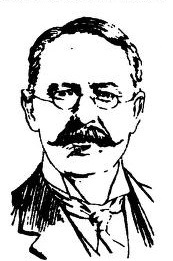

Thomas Ashley Cairns JP (1854 – 3 September 1908) was a British Liberal Party politician who served as a Member of Parliament (MP) for Newcastle-upon-Tyne from the 1906 general election until his death two years later due to diabetes, aged 69.

== Background ==
Cairns was born in Sunderland, the son of Thomas Cairns of Forfarshire. He was educated privately. In 1880 he married Isabella Dixon.

== Professional career ==
Cairns was chief partner of Cairns, Noble & Co., shipowners and merchants. He was Vice President of the Shipowners International Association.

== Political career ==
Cairns was a member of the Newcastle School Board from 1892 to 1899. He was elected to Newcastle City Council in 1896. He was appointed as a Justice of the peace for Newcastle. He was active in the Liberal Party as Vice Chairman of the executive committee of the Northern Liberal Federation. He was Liberal candidate for the two member Newcastle-upon-Tyne division at the 1906 General Election. He ran in tandem with a labour candidate and together they took both seats from the Conservatives. Cairns was in favour of housing reform, social legislation and Women's suffrage.

=== Electoral record ===
General election January 1906
Party	Candidate	Votes	%	±%
Labour Repr. Cmte.	✓ Walter Hudson	18,869	31.1	
Liberal	✓ Thomas Cairns	18,423	30.5	
Conservative	Walter Richard Plummer	11,942	19.8	
Conservative	George Renwick	11,223	18.6	
Turnout			84.6	
Majority		6,927	11.3	
Labour Repr. Cmte. gain from Conservative		Swing		
Majority		6,481	10.7	
Liberal gain from Conservative		Swing		

Parliament of the United Kingdom
Preceded by George Renwick and Sir Walter Plummer	Member of Parliament for Newcastle-upon-Tyne; 1906 – 1908; With: Walter Hudson	Succeeded by George Renwick and Walter Hudson
