= Sir George Renwick, 1st Baronet =

British politician

Sir George Renwick Bt DL

Member of Parliament for Newcastle upon Tyne Central
- In office 1918–1922

Member of Parliament for Newcastle-upon-Tyne
- In office 1908–1910

Member of Parliament for Newcastle-upon-Tyne
- In office 1900–1906

Personal details
- Born: 8 March 1850 Newcastle upon Tyne, England
- Died: 19 June 1931 (aged 81)
- Occupation: Shipowner

Sir George Renwick, 1st Baronet, DL (8 March 1850 – 19 June 1931) was an English politician and shipowner.

Renwick was born in Newcastle upon Tyne. He joined shipowners Pyman, Bell & Co as a clerk and then co-founded his own business, Fisher, Renwick & Co. He had particularly large interests in drydocks, including the world's first-ever floating repair docks, the Tyne Pontoons at Wallsend, which he sold to Swan Hunter & Wigham Richardson Ltd in 1903. He was the co-founder and chairman of Manchester Dry Docks Ltd on the Manchester Ship Canal and joint managing director of Fisher, Renwick, Manchester-London Steamers Ltd, also based on the Manchester Ship Canal and running scheduled steamer services between Manchester and London.

Renwick was elected to Parliament in 1900 as Conservative member for Newcastle-upon-Tyne, serving from 1900 to 1906 and 1908 to 1910, and representing Newcastle upon Tyne Central from 1918 to 1922. He paid for the construction of the Northumberland Fusiliers Memorial in Newcastle city centre as an offering of thanks for the safe return of all five of his sons from the First World War.

His fourth son was MP Gustav Renwick.

He was created a Baronet in the 1921 Birthday Honours for his political service. His seat was at Newminster Abbey, Morpeth.

== Footnotes ==
Parliament of the United Kingdom
| Preceded by William Donaldson Cruddas; Sir Charles Frederic Hamond | Member of Parliament for Newcastle-upon-Tyne; 1900–1906; With: Sir Walter Richard Plummer | Succeeded by Walter Hudson; Thomas Cairns |
| Preceded by Walter Hudson; Thomas Cairns | Member of Parliament for Newcastle-upon-Tyne; 1908–January 1910; With: Walter Hudson | Succeeded by Edward Shortt; Walter Hudson |
| New constituency | Member of Parliament for Newcastle-upon-Tyne Central; 1918–1922 | Succeeded by Sir Charles Trevelyan, Bt |
Baronetage of the United Kingdom
| New creation | Baronet (of Newminster Abbey); 1921–1931 | Succeeded by John Robert Renwick |
