= John Whitfield (politician) =

British politician (born 1941)

John Whitfield (born 31 October 1941) is a British Conservative Party politician.

Having unsuccessfully contested Hemsworth in 1979, Whitfield was elected as the Member of Parliament (MP) for the normally Labour seat of Dewsbury in the Conservative landslide at the 1983 general election. However, he lost the seat to Ann Taylor in 1987, and was unsuccessful in his bid to regain it at the 1992 general election.

Parliament of the United Kingdom
Preceded by David Ginsburg	Member of Parliament for Dewsbury; 1983–1987	Succeeded by Ann Taylor
