= Oxford University Democratic Socialist Club =

Labour breakaway group, 1940–1943

The Oxford University Democratic Socialist Club (OUDSC) was a splinter group from Oxford University Labour Club (OULC), formed in 1940 after disaffiliation by the national Labour Party of OULC over its opposition to the Second World War and its support for the Soviet Union. Its first chair was Tony Crosland, who cofounded the club together with Roy Jenkins who subsequently became chair. David Ginsburg was also a chair, and George Orwell spoke to the club in 1941. OUDSC merged with OULC again in 1943.

== See also ==
- List of Labour Party breakaway parties (UK)
