= J. J. Stephenson =

Socialist activist from Belfast

Joseph James Stephenson (1871 – fl.1912) was a socialist activist from Belfast.

Born in Belfast, Stephenson completed an engineering apprenticeship. In 1892, he was a founder of the Belfast Socialist Society, within which he promoted Irish Home Rule.

In 1895, he moved to Barrow-in-Furness, and within three years, he became the Amalgamated Society of Engineers (ASE) district secretary. A supporter of the Labour Representation Committee, he was elected to its executive council in 1903, becoming its treasurer and then, in 1906, chairman of the renamed Labour Party. He was selected as the chairman of the party conference held in Belfast in 1907. It was also due to pressure from Stephenson that the ASE sponsored Charles Duncan to contest the Barrow-in-Furness seat at the 1906 general election, which Duncan won.

Stephenson was also active in the Independent Labour Party, which selected him as its candidate for the 1908 Newcastle-upon-Tyne by-election. However, this was in conflict with the electoral alliance that existed locally between the Liberal and Labour parties, and the National Executive persuaded Stephenson to withdraw. At the January 1910 general election, he stood for Labour in Birmingham East, initially being promised the support of the businessman Dudley Docker, but this was later withdrawn, and Stephenson lost the election.

Party political offices
Preceded by Arthur Henderson	Chairman of the Labour Party; 1906–1907	Succeeded by Walter Hudson
Trade union offices
Preceded by Frederick Crompton	Representative of District 5 on the Executive Council of the Amalgamated Society of Engineers; 1903–1913	Succeeded by Joseph Wilson
