= William Paling =

British Labour Party politician (1892-1992)

William Thomas Paling
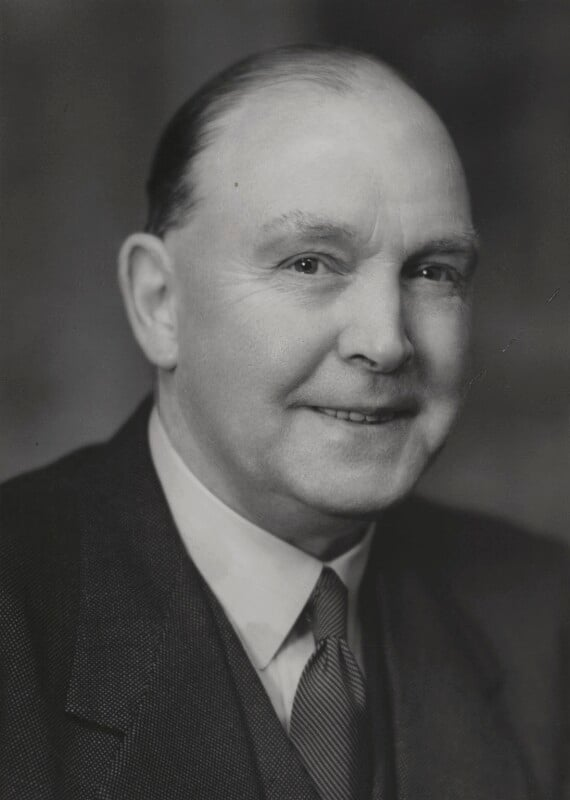
- Paling c. 1950

Member of Parliament for Dewsbury
- In office 5 July 1945 – 8 October 1959
- Preceded by: Ben Riley
- Succeeded by: David Ginsburg

Personal details
- Born: 28 October 1892 Marehay, Ripley, Derbyshire, England
- Died: 10 April 1992 (aged 99)
- Party: Labour
- Relatives: Wilfred Paling (brother)

William Thomas Paling (28 October 1892 – 10 April 1992) was a British Labour Party politician.

Born in Marehay, Ripley, Derbyshire, Paling was the son of George Paling, a coalminer, from Sutton in Ashfield, Nottinghamshire. At the age of 14 he started work in the local colliery before winning a scholarship to the Central Labour College in London. At the college he studied economics, industrial history and sociology. He also began his association with Labour politics. He returned to the coalfields where he became a checkweighman. In 1928 he was elected to the West Riding County Council, holding the seat until his election to Parliament.

Paling made his first attempt to enter Parliament at Burton upon Trent, where he stood unsuccessfully at the general elections of 1929 and 1931. Throughout the 1930s he was active in the miners' trade unions.

At the 1945 general election Paling was elected to the House of Commons as Member of Parliament for Dewsbury. He was sponsored by the National Union of Mineworkers and used his position in parliament to promote mine and industrial safety. His brother, Wilfred Paling, was also a Labour MP and held positions as Minister of Pensions and then Postmaster General in the labour Government of 1945–1951.

Paling was re-elected at Dewsbury in 1950, 1951 and 1955. In 1957 he was making a visit to the British Army of the Rhine to examine the conditions of national servicemen when he was involved in an air accident. The resulting neck injury led to his retirement at the 1959 general election.

Paling had a long retirement, dying in April 1992, aged 99.

Parliament of the United Kingdom
Preceded by Ben Riley	Member of Parliament for Dewsbury; 1945–1959	Succeeded by David Ginsburg
