= David Stephens (parliamentary official) =

British public servant and Clerk of the Parliaments

Sir David Stephens KCB CVO (25 April 1910 – 3 April 1990) was a British public servant and Clerk of the Parliaments from 1963 to 1974. He was educated at Winchester College, Christ Church, Oxford and The Queen's College, Oxford.

He became a Clerk in the House of Lords in 1935, but left in 1938 to become a member of the Runciman Mission to Czechoslovakia. In the same year he transferred to HM Treasury. From 1947 to 1949 he was Principal Private Secretary to Herbert Morrison as Lord President of the Council. From 1955 to 1961 he was Secretary for Appointments to the Prime Minister, serving first Sir Anthony Eden and then Harold Macmillan. In 1960 he was made CVO.

In 1961 he returned to the House of Lords as Reading Clerk. He was appointed Clerk of the Parliaments in 1963, and made KCB in 1964.

After his retirement in 1974 he served from 1976 to 1981 as Chairman of the Redundant Churches Fund (now the Churches Conservation Trust).

== Personal life ==
In 1941 David Stephens married Clemency Gore Browne. They had three sons and a daughter. His youngest son, Christopher Stephens, was appointed Chairman of the Judicial Appointments Commission in 2011. His daughter Caroline married Richard Ryder, later Lord Ryder of Wensum, in 1981. After the death of his first wife in 1966, Sir David Stephens married Charlotte Manisty in 1967.
