= Walter Hudson (British politician) =

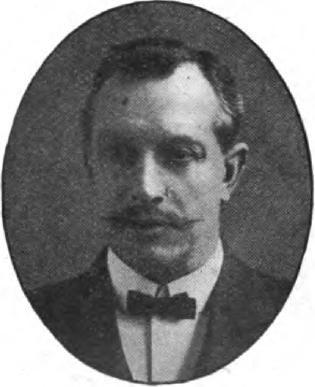
Hudson in the mid-1900s

Walter Hudson (25 January 1852 – 18 March 1935) MP was a Labour Party politician in England. He was Member of Parliament (MP) for Newcastle-upon-Tyne (UK Parliament constituency) from 1906 to 1918.

Hudson worked as a guard with the North Eastern Railway for twenty-five years, and joined the Amalgamated Society of Railway Servants (ASRS). He served as president of the ASRS for eight years, and in 1899 served on the Royal Commission on Accidents to Railwaymen.

From 1898 to 1906, Hudson was the Irish Secretary of the ASRS, and in the role became active in the Irish Trades Union Congress (ITUC), serving as its president in 1903. He was also active in the British Labour Party, and was elected as Member of Parliament for Newcastle-upon-Tyne at the 1906 United Kingdom general election. He presided over the Labour Party's 1908 conference, and remained active in the ASRS and its successor, the National Union of Railwaymen (NUR), as chief of its movements department.

General election 1918: Newcastle upon Tyne East
Party	Candidate	Votes	%	±%
Liberal	Harry Barnes	8,682	58.1	n/a
Labour	Walter Hudson	5,195	34.7	n/a
NFDDSS	John Thompson	1,079	7.2	n/a
Majority		3,487	23.4	n/a
Turnout			48.7	n/a

Hudson lost his Parliament seat at the 1918 United Kingdom general election, and retired completely in 1923.

Parliament of the United Kingdom
Preceded by Sir Walter Richard Plummer and George Renwick	Member of Parliament for Newcastle-upon-Tyne; 1906–1918; Served alongside: Thomas Cairns 1906–1908; George Renwick 1908–1910; Edward Shortt 1910–1918	Constituency abolished
Trade union offices
Preceded by Peter Stewart Macliver	President of the Amalgamated Society of Railway Servants; 1892 – 1899	Succeeded by George Thaxton
Preceded by Hugh McManus	Chair of the Parliamentary Committee of the Irish Trades Union Congress; 1902	Succeeded by William Walker
Preceded by William Cave	President of the Irish Trades Union Congress; 1903	Succeeded by William Walker
Preceded by New position	Assistant General Secretary of the National Union of Railwaymen; 1913–1919; With: Samuel Chorlton; Thomas Lowth; J. H. Thomas (1913–1916)	Succeeded by Charlie Cramp as Industrial General Secretary
Party political offices
Preceded by J. J. Stephenson	Chairman of the Labour Party; 1907–1908	Succeeded by John Robert Clynes
