= Ben Riley (politician) =

British politician (1866–1946)

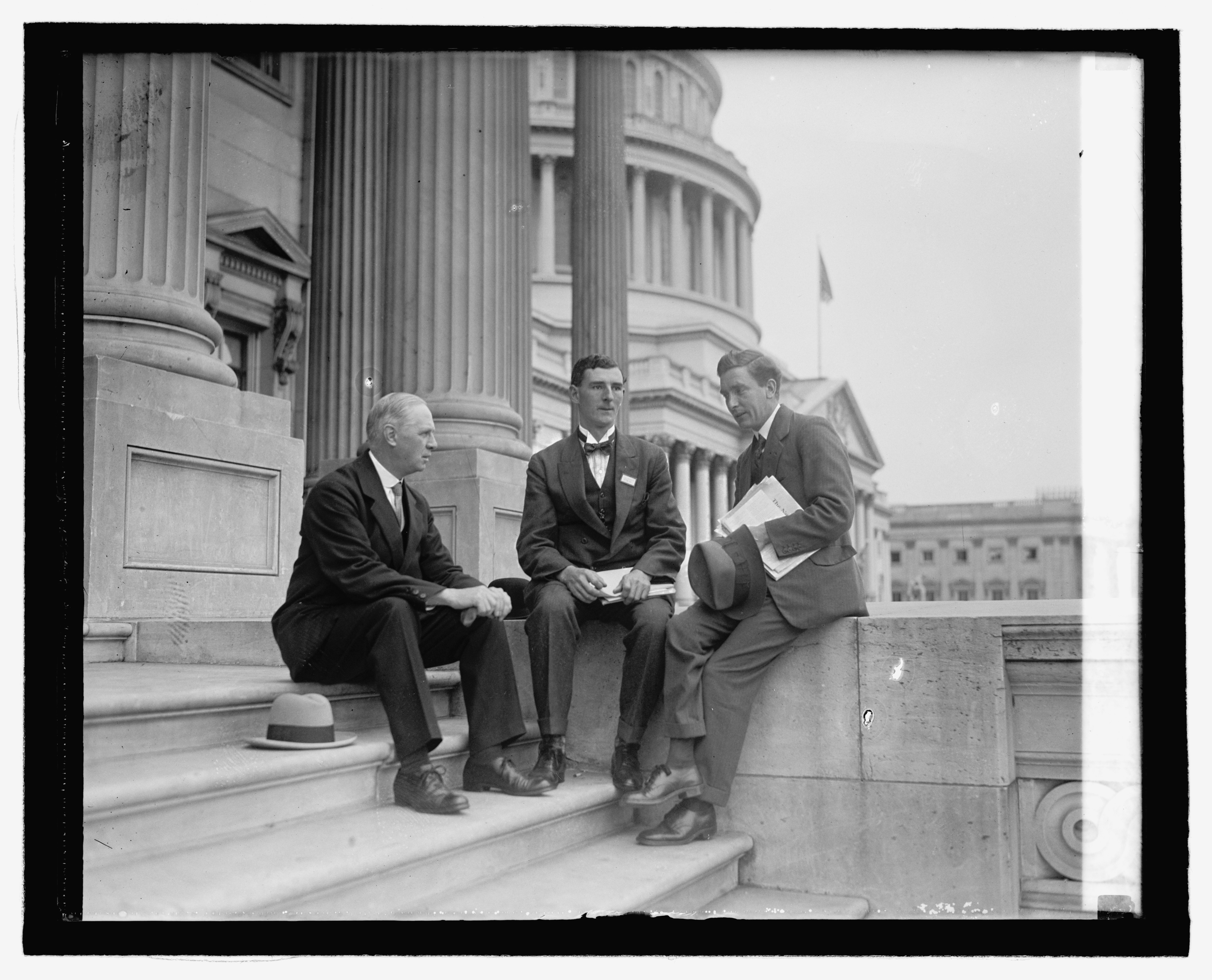
Ben Riley, Tom Williams, Rennie Smith of Great Britain in 1925

Benjamin Riley (1866 – 6 January 1946) was a British Labour Party politician.

Born in Halifax, Riley was the son of a stonemason. He started work aged 9, and was apprenticed to the bookbinding trade. He served as a journeyman in Bath, Brighton and London, eventually starting his own business in Huddersfield in 1896. At the same time he was employed as a lecturer by the Land Restoration League, visiting agricultural labourers in various counties. He married Lucy Rushworth of Halifax, and they had one son.

Riley was a founding member of the Independent Labour Party, and was elected to Huddersfield School Board in 1896 and to Huddersfield Town Council in 1904.

At the 1918 general election Riley stood as the Labour Party's candidate in the Dewsbury constituency, but failed to be elected. At the next election in 1922 Riley won the seat, but lost it the following year. In 1924 he regained the seat. He was Parliamentary Private Secretary to Noel Buxton, Minister of Agriculture, Fisheries and Food in the Labour Government of 1929-1931. At the 1931 general election he lost his seat, along with many other Labour Party MPs.

Riley returned to the Commons at the 1935 general election. He held the seat until the 1945 general election, when he retired.

He died at his home in Huddersfield in January 1946, aged 80.

Parliament of the United Kingdom
Preceded by Emil Pickering	Member of Parliament for Dewsbury; 1922–1923	Succeeded by Edmund Harvey
Preceded by Edmund Harvey	Member of Parliament for Dewsbury; 1924–1931	Succeeded by Walter Rea
Preceded by Walter Rea	Member of Parliament for Dewsbury; 1935–1945	Succeeded by William Paling
Party political offices
Preceded by T. Russell Williams	Yorkshire Division representative on the Independent Labour Party National Administrative Council; 1908–1913	Succeeded by John Palin
Preceded by Charlie Glyde	Yorkshire Division representative on the Independent Labour Party National Administrative Council; 1915–1926	Succeeded by Thomas Stamford
