= Emil Pickering =

British politician

Emil William Pickering DSO TD DL JP (3 June 1882 – 14 March 1942) was a British industrialist, army officer and politician.

Born in Dewsbury in the West Riding of Yorkshire, England. Pickering was educated at Dewsbury Grammar School and Tettenhall College. He subsequently entered business as a woollen manufacturer in partnership with John Greaves. The Pickering Greaves business, based at Ravensthorpe Mills, continued until 1926.

In 1911 Pickering joined the part-time Territorial Force when he received a commission as a second lieutenant in the 2nd West Riding Brigade, Royal Field Artillery. He was promoted to full lieutenant in 1913. With the outbreak of war in August 1914 the unit was mobilised. Pickering was promoted to captain and then to temporary major before the brigade moved to the Western Front in April 1915. Pickering was awarded the Distinguished Service Order for "great gallantry and an utter disregard of his own person" in 1917, and twice mentioned in dispatches, Pickering ended the war with the rank of lieutenant-colonel.

When a general election was called at the end of 1918, Pickering was chosen to contest the Dewsbury constituency as a Coalition Conservative candidate. The election was a three-way contest between Pickering, Benjamin Riley of the Independent Labour Party and the sitting Member of Parliament, Walter Runciman of the anti-coalition Liberal Party faction. Pickering was elected to the Commons, receiving 7,853 votes, more than 2,000 ahead of Riley while Runciman finished third. In 1919 he married Evelyn Shaw of Brooklands, near Halifax, and the couple had two sons. Pickering only served one term in parliament, choosing to stand down at the next election in 1922.

He continued his association with the reconstituted Territorial Army, becoming commanding officer of the 70th (West Riding) Field Brigade, Royal Artillery. He retired from the army in 1926, when he received the brevet rank of colonel and the Territorial Decoration.

Pickering retired to his residence, Netherton Hall, near Wakefield. He was appointed a justice of the peace and a Deputy Lieutenant of the West Riding of Yorkshire. He continued to work for the interests of ex-service men, and became chairman of the Yorkshire Branch of the British Legion.

In 1941, at the height of World War II he was appointed a Deputy Regional Commissioner for the Northern Region.

Emil Pickering died in March 1942 aged 59 when he was thrown from his horse. He was buried in the graveyard of Thornhill Parish Church.

Parliament of the United Kingdom
Preceded by Walter Runciman	Member of Parliament for Dewsbury; 1918–1922	Succeeded by Benjamin Riley
