= Renwick baronets =

Baronetcy in the Baronetage of the United Kingdom

There have been two baronetcies created for persons with the surname Renwick, both in the Baronetage of the United Kingdom.

The Renwick Baronetcy, of Newminster Abbey in Morpeth in the County of Northumberland, was created in the Baronetage of the United Kingdom on 22 June 1921 for the shipping magnate and Conservative politician George Renwick.

The Renwick Baronetcy, of Coombe in the County of Surrey, was created in the Baronetage of the United Kingdom on 28 June 1927 for Harry Benedetto Renwick. For more information on this title, see the Baron Renwick.

== Renwick baronets, of Newminster Abbey (1921) ==
- Sir George Renwick, 1st Baronet (1850–1931)
- Sir John Robert Renwick, 2nd Baronet (1877–1946)
- Sir Eustace Deuchar Renwick, 3rd Baronet (1902–1973)
- Sir Richard Eustace Renwick, 4th Baronet (born 1938)

The heir apparent is the present holder's son Charles Richard Renwick (born 1967). His heir-in-line is his eldest son George Charles Eustace Renwick (born 1995).

== Renwick baronets, of Coombe (1927) ==
- see the Baron Renwick
