= John Simon (MP for Dewsbury) =

British serjeant-at-law and Liberal Party politician

Sir John Simon SL
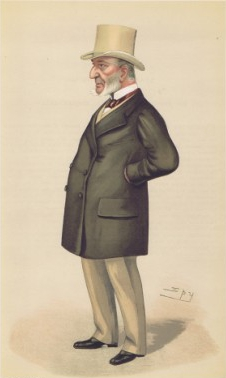
- Simon as caricatured by Spy (Leslie Ward) in Vanity Fair, September 1886

Member of Parliament for Dewsbury
- In office 1868–1888
- Succeeded by: Mark Oldroyd

Personal details
- Born: 9 December 1818 Montego Bay, British Jamaica
- Died: 24 June 1897 (aged 78) London, England
- Spouse: Lady Rachel Simon (m. 1843)
- Education: University of London

Sir John Simon, SL (9 December 1818 – 24 June 1897) was a British serjeant-at-law and Liberal Party politician.

== Biography ==
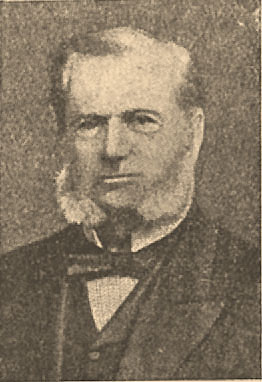
John Simon

Simon was born at Montego Bay, Jamaica, the son of Isaac Simon. He was sent to England in 1833 to a school in Liverpool. He also studied Hebrew as he wanted to become a rabbi, but he entered the law instead. He graduated from the University of London in 1841 and was called to the bar at the Middle Temple in 1842. He went to Jamaica after his marriage to Rachel Salaman in 1843 and practised law briefly at Spanish Town until returning to England later in 1843 for his wife's health.

He became successful on the Northern Circuit, and in the superior courts in London and in 1864 he was created a serjeant-at-law. He was frequently a judge in Manchester and Liverpool, and at the City of London Court. He was granted a patent of precedence in 1868, giving him place and precedence immediately after those Queen's Counsel already created. Simon was elected as MP for Dewsbury in 1868 and held the seat until he retired through ill health in 1888. In parliament he was particularly concerned with reforms of the judicature, and outside parliament was active in campaigning on behalf of Russian Jews. He died in 1897 aged 78.

Parliament of the United Kingdom
New constituency	Member of Parliament for Dewsbury; 1868 – 1888	Succeeded by Mark Oldroyd
