= 1913 Leicester by-election =

UK parliamentary by-election

The 1913 Leicester by-election was a Parliamentary by-election held on 27 June 1913. The constituency returned two Members of Parliament (MPs) to the House of Commons of the United Kingdom, elected by the first past the post voting system.

== Vacancy ==
Eliot Crawshay-Williams was elected at the January 1910 general election as MP for Leicester, serving as parliamentary private secretary to David Lloyd George. He resigned from Parliament in 1913 following his being named as co-respondent in a divorce case brought by fellow Liberal Hubert Carr-Gomm the MP for Rotherhithe.

== Previous result ==
This was a dual member seat where the Liberal party and the Labour party co-operated since 1906 by only putting up one candidate each against the Unionists. At the last election only one Unionist candidate stood. The sitting Labour MP was Ramsay MacDonald, who had been a leading figure in the party nationally and had been responsible for the Gladstone–MacDonald pact of national electoral co-operation between the Labour and Liberal parties.

General election December 1910 Electorate
Party	Candidate	Votes	%	±%
Liberal	Eliot Crawshay-Williams	13,238	39.2	+7.2
Labour	Ramsay MacDonald	12,998	38.5	+7.1
Conservative	Alured Myddelton Wilshere	7,547	22.3	−14.3
Liberal hold		Swing	+11.0	
Majority		5,691	16.9	+3.6
Labour hold		Swing	+10.7	
Majority		5,451	16.2	+3.5
Turnout		33,783	83.5	−8.3

== Candidates ==
Ald. George Banton was adopted as the Independent Labour Party candidate but was forced to withdraw by the refusal of Ramsay MacDonald and the Independent Labour Party national leadership to endorse his candidacy.

This vacancy caused much personal embarrassment to the Labour party Leader, Ramsay MacDonald. Almost all the current Labour MPs owed their seat in Parliament either to individuals winning the endorsement of the dominant local trade union or to co-operation with the local Liberals. Those who owed their seats to Liberal/Labour co-operation were mostly in dual member seats like Leicester, where one Liberal and one Labour candidate ran in harness. MacDonald had recently been outspoken about the prospect of Labour candidates standing against Liberals at the next election, but he had no intention of arranging for two Labour candidates to stand in any dual member seat as this was likely to result in Labour losing many of its existing MPs. The wish of MacDonald's own local Labour party to run a candidate at the by-election seriously undermined his strategy.

Without an official Labour candidate running, the field was open for a Socialist to run. The Yorkshireman Edward Hartley stood as a candidate for the British Socialist Party (BSP). He had previously stood for the Social Democratic Federation (SDF) in Bradford East at the 1906 general election. He next stood for the SDF in the 1908 Newcastle by-election, then back in Bradford East in the January 1910 general election.

== Campaign ==
The Liberal and Labour parties in Leicester had become used to fighting each other (and the Unionists) in local elections. By 1913, the balance on the Town Council was: Liberal 18, Unionist 16, Labour 14. Hartley sought support from the local branch of the Independent Labour Party with some success. Banton sent a telegram of support to Hartley. In addition the Chairman and Vice-Chairman of the local branch of the Independent Labour Party supported Hartley.

== Result ==
The Liberal Party held the seat with a reduced majority.

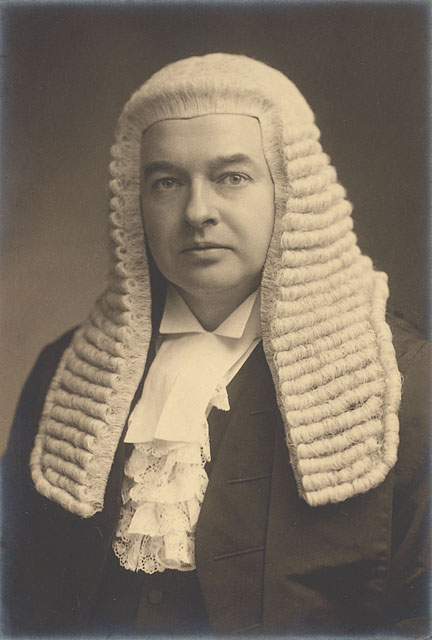
Gordon Hewart

Leicester by-election, 1913 Electorate 26,972
Party	Candidate	Votes	%	±%
Liberal	Gordon Hewart	10,863	47.8	+8.6
Unionist	Alured Myddelton Wilshere	9,279	40.8	+18.5
British Socialist Party	Edward Hartley	2,580	11.4	New
Majority		1,584	7.0	−9.2
Turnout		22,722	84.2	+0.7
Liberal hold		Swing	-4.9	

== Aftermath ==
A General Election was due to take place by the end of 1915. By the summer of 1914, the following candidates had been adopted to contest that election. Due to the outbreak of war, the election never took place.

General Election 1914/15: Leicester Electorate 25,336
Party	Candidate	Votes	%	±%
Liberal	Gordon Hewart			
Labour	Ramsay MacDonald			
Unionist				

Boundary changes replaced the dual member seat of Leicester with three single member seats for the 1918 general election. The Liberal by-election victor Gordon Hewart was elected for Leicester East, defeating Labour's George Banton who had not been allowed to contest the by-election. A Unionist beat a Labour candidate in Leicester South. Ramsay Macdonald was defeated in Leicester West by a Unionist standing under a National Democratic and Labour Party label. As for the defeated by-election candidates, the Unionist Wilshere did not stand again and the Socialist Hartley joined the pro-war British Workers League the fore-runner to the National Democratic and Labour Party, whose candidate defeated Macdonald in 1918.
