= Patent of precedence =

A patent of precedence is a grant to an individual by letters patent of a higher social or professional position than the precedence to which his ordinary rank entitles him.

== Historical use in the English legal profession ==
The principal instance in recent times of patents of grants of this description has been the grant of precedence to members of the English bar. Formerly, the rank of king's counsel not only precluded a barrister from appearing against the Crown, but, if he was a member of parliament, entailed that he give up his seat. A patent of precedence was resorted to as a means of conferring similar marks of honour on distinguished counsel without any such disability attached to it. The patents obtained by Mansfield, Erskine, Scott, Jervis and Brougham were granted on this ground.

After the serjeants-at-law lost their exclusive right of audience in the Court of Common Pleas, it became customary to grant patents of precedence to a number of serjeants, giving them rank immediately after KCs already created and before those of subsequent creation. Mr Justice Phillimore was, on his appointment as a judge of the queen's bench division (in 1897) the only holder of a patent of precedence at the bar, except Serjeant Simon, who died in that year, and who was the last of the serjeants who held such a patent.

== Canada ==
In Canada, patents of precedence are granted both by the Governor General and by the Lieutenant Governors of the provinces under provincial legislation which has been declared intra vires.
