= David Ginsburg (politician) =

British politician

David Ginsburg (18 March 1921 – 18 March 1994) was a British politician.

Ginsburg was educated at University College School, Hampstead, and Balliol College, Oxford. During his time at Oxford University, he was chair of the Oxford University Democratic Socialist Club. He was an economist and market research expert and was secretary of the Labour Party's research department.

At the 1959 general election, he was elected Member of Parliament (MP) for Dewsbury in the West Riding of Yorkshire.

In 1981, Ginsburg was among the Labour MPs who defected to the new Social Democratic Party. In 1983, he polled 25% of the vote in Dewsbury, coming third and possibly having the effect of splitting the Labour vote and helping the Conservative candidate John Whitfield win.

Ginsburg died in 1994 on his 73rd birthday.

== Sources ==
- Times Guide to the House of Commons, 1966 & 1983
- Leigh Rayment's Historical List of MPs

Parliament of the United Kingdom
Preceded by William Paling	Member of Parliament for Dewsbury; 1959–1983	Succeeded by John Whitfield
Party political offices
Preceded by Wilfred Fienburgh	Secretary of the Research Department of the Labour Party; 1952–1959	Succeeded by Peter Shore
