= Walter Runciman, 1st Viscount Runciman of Doxford =

British politician (1870–1949)

The Right Honourable The Viscount Runciman of Doxford PC
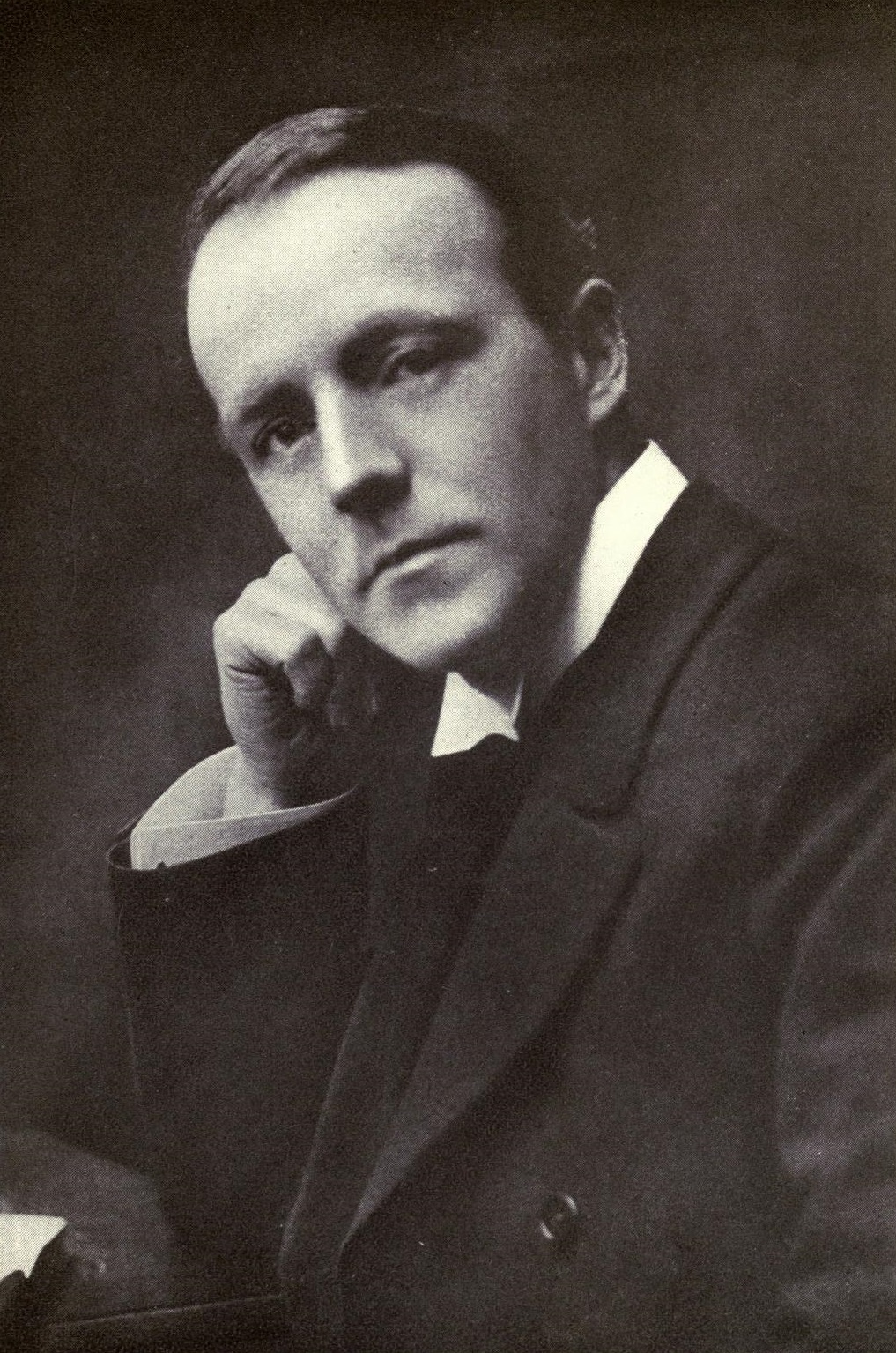

President of the Board of Education
- In office 12 April 1908 – 23 October 1911
- Monarchs: Edward VII; George V
- Prime Minister: H. H. Asquith
- Preceded by: Reginald McKenna
- Succeeded by: Jack Pease

President of the Board of Agriculture
- In office 23 October 1911 – 6 August 1914
- Monarch: George V
- Prime Minister: H. H. Asquith
- Preceded by: The Earl Carrington
- Succeeded by: The Lord Lucas

President of the Board of Trade
- In office 5 August 1914 – 5 December 1916
- Monarch: George V
- Prime Minister: H. H. Asquith
- Preceded by: John Burns
- Succeeded by: Sir Albert Stanley
- In office 5 November 1931 – 28 May 1937
- Monarchs: George V Edward VIII; George VI
- Prime Minister: Ramsay MacDonald; Stanley Baldwin
- Preceded by: Sir Philip Cunliffe-Lister
- Succeeded by: Hon. Oliver Stanley

Lord President of the Council
- In office 31 October 1938 – 3 September 1939
- Monarch: George VI
- Prime Minister: Neville Chamberlain
- Preceded by: The Viscount Hailsham
- Succeeded by: The Earl Stanhope

Personal details
- Born: 19 November 1870
- Died: 14 November 1949 (aged 78)
- Party: Liberal; National Liberal
- Spouse: Hilda Stevenson (m. 1898)
- Children: 5
- Parent: Walter Runciman, 1st Baron Runciman (father)

Walter Runciman, 1st Viscount Runciman of Doxford, PC (19 November 1870 – 14 November 1949) was a prominent Liberal and later National Liberal politician in the United Kingdom. His 1938 diplomatic mission to Czechoslovakia was key to the enactment of the British policy of appeasement of Nazi Germany preceding the Second World War.

== Background ==
Runciman was the son of the shipping magnate Walter Runciman, 1st Baron Runciman. He was educated at South Shields High School and Trinity College, Cambridge, where he graduated with an MA degree in history in 1892.

== Political career ==
=== 1899–1913 ===
Runciman unsuccessfully contested Gravesend in a by-election in 1898, but was elected as a member of parliament (MP) in a two-member by-election for Oldham in 1899, defeating the Conservative candidates, James Mawdsley and Winston Churchill. After winning, Runciman is reported to have commented to Churchill: "Don't worry, I don't think this is the last the country has heard of either of us." The following year in the 1900 general election Churchill stood against Runciman again and defeated him.

Runciman soon returned to Parliament for Dewsbury in a by-election in January 1902 and steadily rose through the ranks of the Liberal Party. A progressive, centrist reformer who supported progressive measures such as old age pensions, he was appointed Parliamentary Secretary to the Local Government Board by Sir Henry Campbell-Bannerman in 1905, a post he held until 1907. Runciman's friends in Campbell-Bannerman's cabinet were Sydney Buxton, Charles Hobhouse and John Morley, all on the left.

He then served as Financial Secretary to the Treasury until 1908. In April of the latter year he was sworn of the Privy Council and appointed to his first Cabinet post, President of the Board of Education, by the new prime minister, H. H. Asquith, which position he retained for three years. Runciman approved of financing the purchase of land in Ireland, but the policy was becoming prohibitively expensive. He was one of the small group, that included Reginald McKenna, who believed in sound public finances; they had witnessed the lax administration of the Chief Secretary for Ireland.

Runciman, along with McKenna and Lord Haldane, pressured Prime Minister H. H. Asquith to reject Chancellor of the Exchequer David Lloyd George's 1910 People's Budget raising taxes on the landed aristocracy and upper class to pay for welfare programs.

He then served another three years as President of the Board of Agriculture. Runciman did not want war with the German Empire and favoured an understanding with her, but like others in the Cabinet was not able to exert much influence over foreign policy.

Commenting on Runciman’s approach to social issues, one observer has argued that while Runciman

passionately supported social reform there were limitations to the support in terms of the detail, particularly where policy was perceived to be pandering to the interests of one specific group rather than for the good of all. Inclinations of this emerged even before Asquith became Prime Minister, but were revealed in exchanges with Asquith, concerning issues such as the extension of the Workmen’s Compensation Act to seamen and the Miners' Eight Hour bill. Here, the attitude to both was also coloured by his concern to protect interests of the shipping industry, but he felt there were wider social impacts, particularly in the latter case, in imposing burdens on consumers. More importantly, furthermore, there were some concerns about the old age pensions (1908), implementation of 'Living Wage' legislation, and the People’s Budget (1909).25 On the issue of the Budget, for instance, he privately stated that there was the possibility of creating a bad precedent for the future in terms of spiralling social expenditure costs.

=== Other policies ===
Runciman was a personal friend of Margot Asquith, and a highly valued colleague in Cabinet. He supported the Haldane Mission of 1912, in a purged cabinet dominated by like-minded Liberal Leaguers. He and his allies believed that there would be peace in the long run, as the Imperial German Navy was 'a luxury' too expensive for the Reich to maintain. Runciman was also in the McKenna dining group that opposed escalation of the Anglo-German naval arms race, and in January 1914 opposed First Lord of the Admiralty Winston Churchill's high naval estimates. The left-wing cabinet members desired specificity to Admiralty reductions, but the admirals themselves opposed them.

Runciman joined Lloyd George's "Council of War" on 13 June, which was mainly designed to exculpate Lloyd George of any involvement in the Marconi scandal. Runciman had done much to encourage Lloyd George as Chancellor in increasing levels of trade.

Runciman encouraged political dialogue, socialism, and James Larkin's movement in Ireland, which the cabinet swiftly sought to decriminalise. Runciman was one of those who agreed to fight the Larne gun-running incident by seizure of weapons. The cabinet banned all arms shipments to Ireland on 25 November.

Runciman was also sympathetic to addressing issues concerning rural areas, such as improved wages for agricultural labourers and the provision of housing.

=== Opposing total war ===
In 1914, on the British entry into World War I, the President of the Board of Trade, John Burns, resigned and on Sunday 2 August Runciman was appointed to succeed him. (Note: On 3 August, Beauchamp joined Burns and Morley who had all stepped down.)

The Board of Trade reported in October 1914 a build-up of German shipping at Hamburg; a record 187 ships entered British ports on 15 October, meaning the war seemed to be good for business. He approved food for Belgian refugees. On 12 January 1915, he agreed to send a memo to the US government to ban all copper imports to Ireland.

Runciman was wholly sympathetic to Lloyd George's proposal to actively intervene in union wage disputes since "men were not malingering, but worn out...". The statement preceded the mass employment of women in factories. Runciman proposed a bill "commandeering" the armaments factories for the national war effort. Sitting between McKenna and Hobhouse, he announced an industrial agreement to pay a guaranteed 15% dividend, plus depreciation. They discussed bringing German-owned dye industries into British ownership and a prohibition of coal exports.

Runciman encouraged Kitchener at dinner to remove Sir John French from command of the British Expeditionary Force (BEF). They also discussed Asquith's removal since his wife, Hilda Runciman, had called the Prime Minister "brains in aspic". Runciman was against any suggestion of internment of aliens, yet they were nonetheless confined in large numbers.

=== Board of Trade ===
Runciman in circa 1916

In May 1915, after seeking Sir Edward Grey's counsel at the Foreign Office, Runciman agreed to serve in Asquith's new coalition government. Asquith had formed this without consulting most of the outgoing Liberal cabinet; a week later he was promoted to President of the Board of Trade. By October, the cabinet was in open conflict, with the Conservatives (and Chancellor Lloyd George) demanding the introduction of conscription. He threatened to resign over the issue but in the end did not do so when it was carried into law in the Military Service Act 1916.

Like McKenna, Runciman was against total warfare of which Compulsory Service formed a major part. He resented the Conservative Army interests pre-eminent in government from spring 1916. General Haig had been convinced they intended to split the cabinet against Asquith. Runciman and his allies continued to argue that conscription would damage the war effort by "depleting industry"; Margot Asquith had already tried to split up the axis within the Cabinet by inviting Runciman and then McKenna to tea separately. However, Runciman continued to enjoy good relations with the Chancellor because they shared the aims of improving trade receipts, reducing debt, and increasing output.

Runciman resigned along with the rest of Asquith's government in December 1916. He did not serve in the new coalition headed by David Lloyd George. In the splits that were to rage in the Liberal Party for the next seven years, Runciman remained prominent in opposition to Lloyd George, especially when the latter became Leader of the Liberal Party in 1926.

He lost his seat in the 1918 general election, and failed to get elected in the 1920 Edinburgh North by-election but was returned for Swansea West in the 1924 general election. That same year, Runciman and a handful of other Liberals set up a "Radical Group" within the Liberal Party, with Runciman defining it as such: "The distinctive characteristic of the Radical group is that they are not embarrassed by compromise in any direction either Right or Left. They do not regard politics as a game, and they do not wish to arrive at understandings with their opponents for the compromise of their principles".

=== 1929–1940 ===
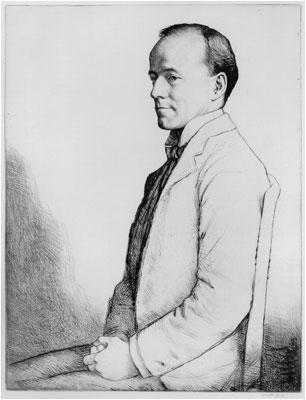
Walter Runciman, etching by William Strang, 1913

In the 1929 general election, the Liberals emerged holding the balance of power between the Conservatives and Labour. Runciman took the seat of St Ives, which his wife Hilda had won in a by-election the previous year. Capt. Sydney Augustus Velden, Liberal Agent for St. Ives was instrumental in Runciman's successful election. The Runcimans were the first man and wife to sit concurrently in the Parliament of the United Kingdom. The Liberals soon found themselves heavily divided over how to respond to the Great Depression, whether or not to continue supporting the Labour government of Ramsay MacDonald and even over the basic direction of the party.

In 1931, the cause of the strife was seemingly removed when the Labour government was succeeded by an all-party National Government. Further division emerged, however, when it was proposed that the National Government call a general election to seek a mandate to introduce protective tariffs, a policy that was anathema to Runciman and many other Liberals. Officially, the Liberals threatened to withdraw from the government, but a group led by Sir John Simon emerged as the Liberal Nationals, mainly composed of those who had been opposed to Lloyd George's leadership and who were prepared to continue to support the National Government. A compromise was worked out whereby each party in the National Government campaigned on its own manifesto.

After the National Government won a massive majority in the 1931 general election, the Cabinet was reconstructed. It was felt prudent to balance the key Cabinet committee that would take the decisions on tariffs; and so Runciman was appointed President of the Board of Trade once more, in the belief that he would serve as a counterbalance to the protectionist Chancellor of the Exchequer Neville Chamberlain. However, like the other Liberal Nationals, Runciman came to accept the principle of tariffs, amended in November 1931 to 10% in favour of a balance of trade recommended by a Tariff Board. When in late 1932 the official Liberals (the Samuelites) resigned their ministerial posts, Runciman very nearly resigned with them. In 1933 the official Liberals withdrew completely their support for the National Government but Runciman remained in office, despite holding the presidency of the extra-Parliamentary National Liberal Federation until 1934. He concluded the Roca-Runciman Treaty with Argentina (one of the events of the Infamous Decade), initiated by that country to avoid the curtailment of Argentine beef imports.

In a 1934 speech Runciman defended the record of the National Government, citing measures such as a town and country planning country act, "the opening of the greatest crusades against slums ever attempted in any country", and an upcoming unemployment insurance bill.

Runciman remained as President of the Board of Trade until May 1937 when Stanley Baldwin retired and his successor, Neville Chamberlain, only offered Runciman the sinecure position of Lord Privy Seal, an offer Runciman declined. In June 1937 he was raised to the peerage as Viscount Runciman of Doxford, of Doxford in the County of Northumberland. Four years earlier his father had been created Baron Runciman and "of Doxford" was consequently used to differentiate from his father's title. This was a rare case of a father and son sitting in the House of Lords at the same time, with the son holding a superior title. A few months later his father died, and he inherited both the barony and his father's shipping business.

=== Mission to Czechoslovakia ===
Runciman returned to public life in early August 1938, when Prime Minister Neville Chamberlain sent him on a mission to Czechoslovakia to mediate in a dispute between the Government of Czechoslovakia and the Sudeten German Party (SdP), which represented most of the ethnic Germans of the border regions, which were known as the Sudetenland. Unknown to Runciman, the SdP, which ostensibly called for autonomy for the Sudetenland, followed instructions from Nazi Germany not to reach any agreement on the matter, and thus the attempts at mediation failed. With international tension rising in Central and Eastern Europe, Runciman was recalled to London on 16 September 1938.

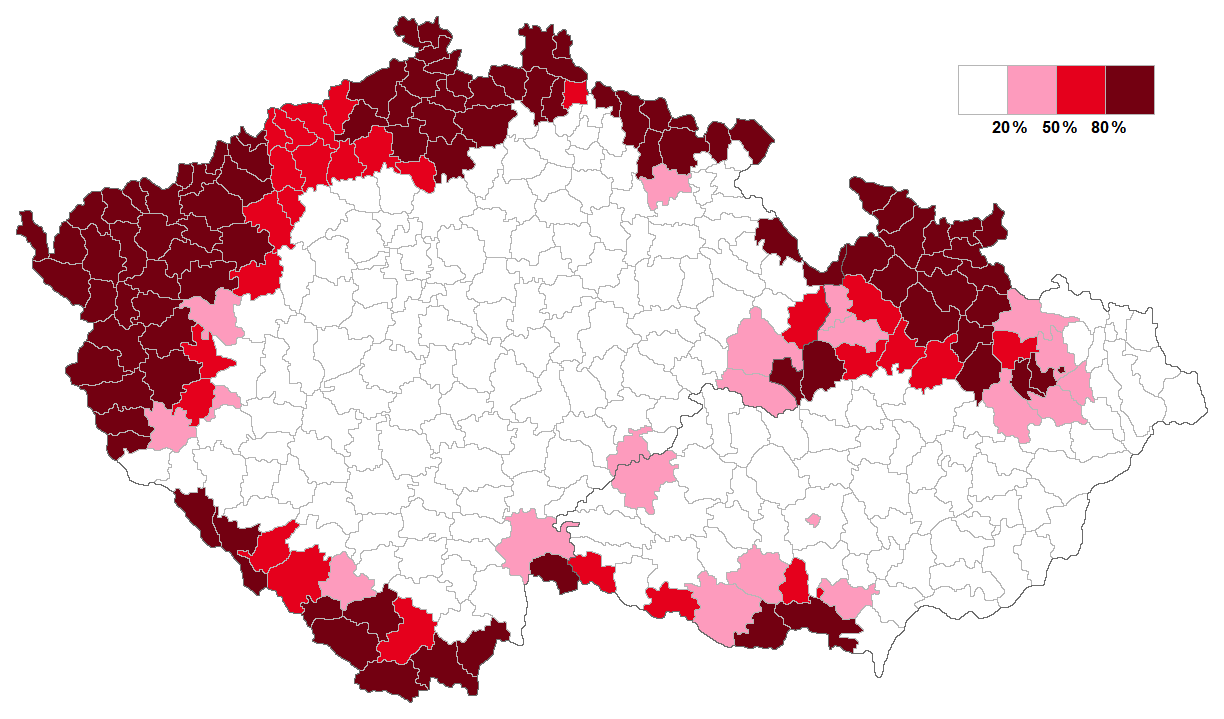
Districts in Czechoslovakia with an ethnic German population of 20% or more (pink), 50% or more (red), and 80% or more (dark red) according to the census of 1930.

The published outcome of the mission, known as the Runciman Report, was issued by the mediator on 21 September 1938 in the form of letters addressed to Neville Chamberlain and Edvard Beneš, the President of Czechoslovakia. The report held the SdP responsible for breaking off negotiations with the Czechoslovak government although the revised government proposals met "almost all the requirements" of the SdP. Runciman considered the actions of the Czechoslovak authorities to be "not actively oppressive, and certainly not 'terroristic'" but "marked by tactlessness, lack of understanding, petty intolerance and discrimination". The multiple complaints of economic and political discrimination voiced by the Sudeten Germans were, he believed, "in the main justified" and gave rise to a feeling of "hopelessness", but "the rise of Nazi Germany gave them new hope". Runciman, therefore, considered "their turning for help towards their kinsmen and their eventual desire to join the Reich as a natural development in the circumstances". This led him to conclude "that these frontier districts should at once be transferred from Czechoslovakia to Germany".

Chamberlain agreed to the transfer of the border regions of Czechoslovakia to Nazi Germany at the Munich Conference on 30 September 1938. Archival evidence suggests that the recommendations of the Runciman Report were amended at a late stage of the drafting to provide justification for Chamberlain's policy of territorial transfer.

Further controversy arose from Runciman's use of his weekend leisure time in Czechoslovakia. That was spent mostly but not entirely on the country estates of members of the SdP-supporting Sudeten German aristocracy in a social and political environment hostile to the Czechoslovak government.

In October 1938, after the Munich Agreement, Chamberlain reshuffled his Cabinet and appointed Runciman as Lord President of the Council. He held that post until the outbreak of the Second World War in September 1939.

== Family ==
Lord Runciman of Doxford married Hilda, daughter of James Cochran Stevenson, in 1898. They had two sons and three daughters. Their daughter Margaret Fairweather (married Douglas Fairweather who established the Air Movements Flight in 1942, later joined by Margaret) was the first woman to fly a Spitfire and was one of the original eight female pilots selected by Pauline Gower to join the Air Transport Auxiliary. Margaret was killed in 1944 whilst landing a Proctor. Their second son, the Honourable Sir Steven Runciman, was a historian. Lord Runciman of Doxford died in November 1949, aged 78, and was succeeded in the viscountcy by his elder son, Leslie. Lady Runciman died in 1956, aged 87.

== Arms ==
Coat of arms of Walter Runciman, 1st Viscount Runciman of Doxford
Crest A seahorse erect gules, holding in the fore fins a thistle as in the arms. Escutcheon Per fess or and azure a lymphad oars in action, the sail charged with a thistle leaved and slipped proper, flags flying to the dexter gules. Supporters On either side a seahorse or gorged with a chain pendent therefrom a grappling iron azure. Motto "By sea"

== Notes ==
=== References ===
Parliament of the United Kingdom
Preceded by Robert Ascroft; James Francis Oswald	Member of Parliament for Oldham; 1899–1900; With: Alfred Emmott	Succeeded by Alfred Emmott; Winston Churchill
Preceded by Mark Oldroyd	Member of Parliament for Dewsbury; 1902–1918	Succeeded by Emil William Pickering
Preceded by Howel Walter Samuel	Member of Parliament for Swansea West; 1924–1929	Succeeded by Howel Walter Samuel
Preceded by Hilda Runciman	Member of Parliament for St Ives; 1929–1937	Succeeded by Alec Beechman
Political offices
Preceded by Arthur Frederick Jeffreys	Parliamentary Secretary to the Local Government Board; 1905–1907	Succeeded by Thomas James Macnamara
Preceded by Reginald McKenna	Financial Secretary to the Treasury; 1907–1908	Succeeded by Charles Hobhouse
Preceded by Reginald McKenna	President of the Board of Education; 1908–1911	Succeeded by Jack Pease
Preceded by The Earl Carrington	President of the Board of Agriculture; 1911–1914	Succeeded by The Lord Lucas
Preceded by John Burns	President of the Board of Trade; 1914–1916	Succeeded by Sir Albert Stanley
Preceded by Sir Philip Cunliffe Lister	President of the Board of Trade; 1931–1937	Succeeded by Hon. Oliver Stanley
Preceded by The Viscount Hailsham	Lord President of the Council; 1938–1939	Succeeded by The Earl Stanhope
Peerage of the United Kingdom
New creation	Viscount Runciman of Doxford; June 1937 – 1949	Succeeded by Leslie Runciman
Preceded by Walter Runciman	Baron Runciman; August 1937 – 1949	Succeeded by Leslie Runciman
