= Runciman Mission =

British Government initiative

The Runciman Mission to Czechoslovakia was an initiative of the British government that was aimed at resolving an international crisis threatening to lead to war in Europe in the summer of 1938. The Mission, headed by a former British cabinet minister Lord Runciman, was sent to mediate in a dispute between the Government of Czechoslovakia and the Sudeten German Party (SdP), representing the country's mostly-radicalised ethnic German minority. The British mediators were active on the ground in Czechoslovakia during the late summer and issued their report shortly before the Munich Conference in September.

== Background ==
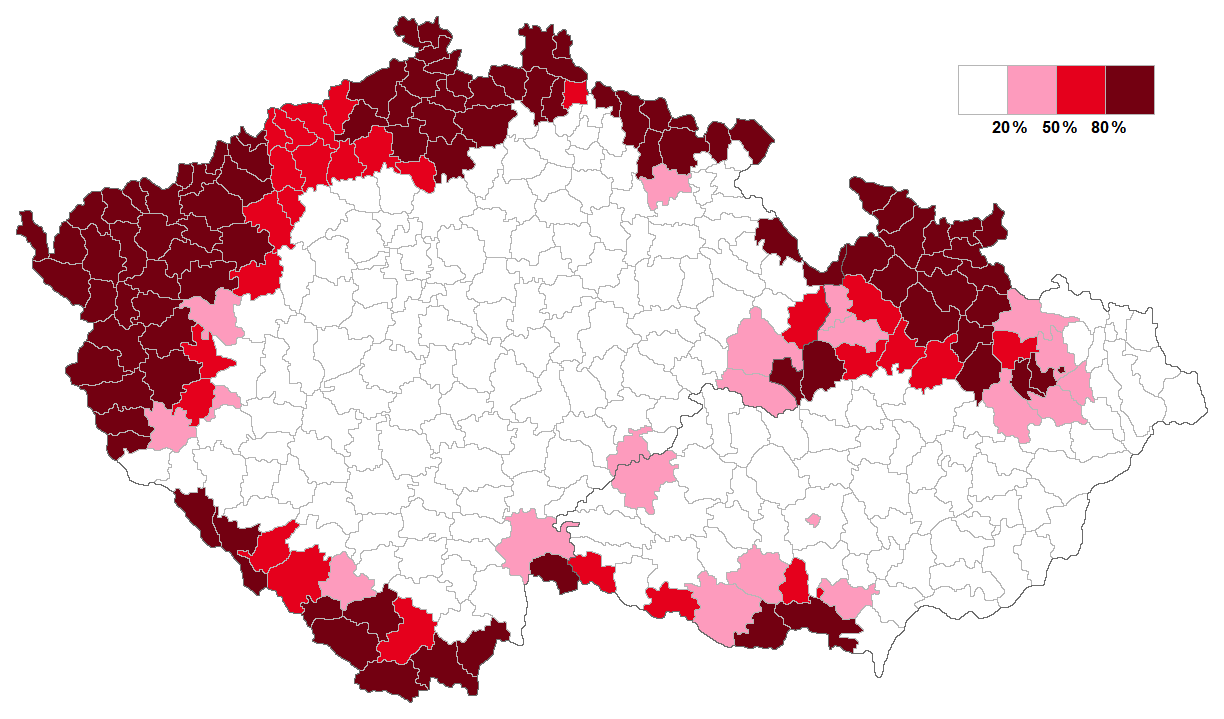
Districts in Czechoslovakia with an ethnic German population of 20% or more (pink), 50% or more (red), and 80 % or more (dark red) according to the census of 1930.

The crisis in Czechoslovakia arose from demands for territorial autonomy (and probable eventual secession) for the predominantly German-speaking areas located mainly along the western borders of Czechoslovakia, which became known as the Sudetenland. The territories had a population of over 3 million ethnic Germans and were historically parts of Lands of the Bohemian Crown, and Germans have been settling there since the 13th century.The territory had been included in Czechoslovakia, largely for strategic and economic reasons, during the formation of the state in 1918.

After Adolf Hitler's rise to power (Machtergreifung) in neighbouring Germany in 1933, the German minority population within Czechoslovakia, radicalised by economic hardship and NS propaganda, turned to the SdP, which emulated the Nazis across the border. In April 1938, the SdP leader, Konrad Henlein, demanded not only full administrative autonomy for the German areas but also the right to practice National Socialism within them.

Earlier, in March 1938, during a meeting with Hitler in Berlin, Henlein was instructed to keep tension high by continuing to make demands of the Czechoslovak authorities but to avoid reaching a settlement with them. The secret plan of preparation for the invasion of Czechoslovakia, Case Green, was set for completion by 1 October 1938.

== Negotiations ==
Lord Runciman and his small team (Note: In addition to Runciman himself and Ashton-Gwatkin (a Foreign Office official), who acted as chief-of-staff, the Mission comprised, Robert Stopford (a banker with experience of international financial negotiations), Ian Henderson (a former British Consul at Innsbruck), Geoffrey Peto (a former Conservative Member of Parliament and parliamentary aide to Runciman), David Stephens (a parliamentary official), with secretarial provision by Rosemary Miller and Aline Tillard. Basil Newton, the British Minister in Prague, was also, in effect, part of the team. Hilda Runciman (a former Liberal Member of Parliament) accompanied her husband in a private capacity. [Vyšný, Paul, The Runciman Mission to Czechoslovakia, 1938: Prelude to Munich, Palgrave Macmillan, Basingstoke, 2003, pp. 128–33.]) arrived in Prague on 2 and 3 August 1938. Although ostensibly independent of the British government, a key member of the Mission was Frank Ashton-Gwatkin, technically on secondment from his official duties at the London Foreign Office. Separate negotiations were held with the Czechoslovak government and the SdP with a view to achieving a mediated settlement of the dispute. During meetings with Czechoslovak President, Edvard Beneš and other government officials, Runciman repeatedly pressed for significant concessions be made to the SdP. Runciman also met Henlein on several occasions but did not subject him to the same pressure for an agreement.

The Czechoslovak government initially resisted the SdP's demand for full autonomy of the German areas, but, under intense diplomatic pressure from Britain and France (Czechoslovakia's principal ally), Beneš conceded the point in the so-called 'Fourth Plan', which in effect called the bluff of the SdP. That development caused the SdP to break off contacts with the Czechoslovak authorities and led to an increase of unrest in the German areas. The situation was further exacerbated by a bellicose speech from Hitler on September 12 that triggered an uprising in the Sudeten territories. The decisive action by the Czechoslovak authorities restored order and the SdP leadership fled to Germany.

In the atmosphere of rising international tension in Central Europe, Runciman was summoned back to London on 16 September to brief ministers. The following day, he informed a meeting of the Cabinet that in his view, "Czechoslovakia could not continue to exist as she was today", and some territory would have to be ceded to Germany, even if "no more than cutting off certain fringes". Other solutions, including the use of a plebiscite for the German areas, the creation of an independent Sudeten-German state, the calling of a four-power conference, the federalisation of Czechoslovakia or the implementation of a variant of Benes's 'Fourth Plan', were now considered by Runciman as impractical.

== Visiting Hitler ==
Toward the end of August, the lack of progress in negotiations in Czechoslovakia, accompanied by signs of increasing belligerence in Nazi Germany, prompted the British government to seek direct contact with Hitler. The initial idea was for Runciman to undertake the task, but he resolutely refused to do so. Arguing that it would compromise the independence of his Mission (and also on account of suffering ill health in the late summer heat in Prague), he declared: "I am just not going to do it!" Runciman's refusal resulted in Prime Minister Neville Chamberlain developing plans for the dramatic step of himself flying to Germany to meet Hitler at Berchtesgaden on 15 September.

== Report ==
The report of the Runciman Mission, in the form of letters to the British and Czechoslovak prime ministers dated 21 September 1938, was strongly hostile in tone towards the Czechoslovak government and recommended the immediate transfer of the territories inhabited mainly by Germans to Germany. The 2000-word report placed the responsibility for the breakdown in negotiations very firmly on the SdP leadership, which used the pretext of civil unrest in some German areas to sever contacts. The report also noted that Beneš's 'Fourth Plan' proposals met "almost all the requirements" of the SdP's demands. Nevertheless, when itemising the grievances of the German minority, Runciman expressed his sympathy for the Sudeten case by observing that it was "a hard thing to be ruled by an alien race". Although declaring that Czech rule was "not actively oppressive, and certainly not 'terroristic'", the report alleged that "it was marked by tactlessness, lack of understanding, petty intolerance and discrimination".

The issues complained of to the electoral system in which the SdP could be outvoted in parliament, the appointment of Czech officials in German areas, Czech farmers moving into these areas, Czech schools being built for their children, discrimination in favour of Czech firms in government contracts and Czechs receiving preferential economic relief. Runciman was highly critical of the Czechoslovak authorities for failing to provide adequate remedies for these perceived injustices. That failure, he noted, resulted in a feeling of "hopelessness" amongst the German population, but the "rise of Nazi Germany" gave them "new hope." He added, "I regard their turning for help towards their kinsmen and their eventual desire to join the Reich as a natural development in the circumstances". Foreseeing the danger of increased violence and even "civil war", Runciman considered that the "frontier districts should at once be transferred from Czechoslovakia to Germany" without recourse to a plebiscite, which would be a "sheer formality". Amongst other measures the report proposed the neutralisation of the remainder of Czechoslovakia and an international guarantee of its security.

The report ostensibly provided the evidential basis for the proposals made by Chamberlain during his second meeting with Hitler at Bad Godesberg on 22 September. The proposals involved the transfer to Germany of the districts in Czechoslovakia with a majority-German population. Archival evidence suggests that the report was revised at a late stage, probably by Ashton-Gwatkin, to bring the document fully into line with British policy. The original draft of the report proposed the transfer of some territory, but the extent of the area that was concerned is open to question. However, when previously addressing the Cabinet on 17 September, Runciman indicated that he had in mind the specific possibility of transferring the areas with high concentrations of German inhabitants around the towns of Cheb and Aš, in the extreme west of the country.

== Reactions ==
Runciman's activities in Czechoslovakia were eagerly followed by a large international press corps, some of which, in the course of their reporting, were critical of the use of his leisure time. The 67-year-old mediator (who was accompanied in Czechoslovakia by his wife, Hilda Runciman) spent most of his weekends relaxing in the company of the Sudeten German aristocracy, many of whose members were supporters of the SdP. (Note: Runciman's stay in Czechoslovakia extended over six weekends, five of which were spent on the estates of the German aristocracy, which were located mostly in areas where he was exposed to the influence of the SdP. Only one of his hosts, Zdeněk Kinský, at Žďár in Moravia, was openly supportive of the Czechoslovak government. The other weekends were spent with Ulrich Kinsky, near Česká Kamenice; Adolf Schwarzenberg, at Český Krumlov; Clary-Aldringen, at Teplice and Eugen Czernin, at Petersburg. In addition, the estate of Max Hohenlohe, near Chomutov, who acted as the Mission's go-between with the SdP leadership, served as the venue for Runciman's meetings with Henlein. [Glassheim, Eagle, Noble Nationalists: The Transformation of the Bohemian Aristocracy, Cambridge, Mass., 2005, pp. 178–86.]) These activities were arranged at the behest of the SdP with the aim of exposing the mediator to a social milieu favourable to their cause. Despite his rejection of the criticism, Runciman's claim of impartiality became severely compromised in the eyes of many.

Following the publication of the Runciman Report on 28 September, the American journalist Dorothy Thompson drew attention to a perceived internal inconsistency in the document and termed it as "illogical". She also expressed the suspicion that the report was “made to order to fit the agreement” reached between Hitler and Chamberlain at Berchtesgaden and was a "piece of propaganda". Ashton-Gwatkin subsequently stated that Runciman had asked him to write a report that would "support the Prime Minister's policy".

== Bibliography ==
- Bruegel, J.W. (1973). Czechoslovakia Before Munich: The German Minority Problem and British Appeasement Policy. Cambridge.
- Glassheim, Eagle (2005). Noble Nationalists: The Transformation of the Bohemian Aristocracy. Cambridge, Mass.
- Lukes, Igor (1996). Czechoslovakia between Stalin and Hitler: The Foreign Policy of Edvard Beneš in the 1930s. New York.
- Luža, Radomír (1964). The Transfer of the Sudeten Germans: A Study of Czech-German Relations, 1933–1962. New York.
- Perman, D. (1962). The Shaping of the Czechoslovak State: Diplomatic History of the Boundaries of Czechoslovakia, 1914–1920. Leiden.
- Smelser, Ronald M. (1975). The Sudeten Problem, 1933–1938: Volkstumspolitik and the Formulation of Nazi Foreign Policy. Folkestone.
- Vyšný, Paul, The Runciman Mission to Czechoslovakia, 1938: Prelude to Munich, Basingstoke, 2003.
- Wiskemann, Elizabeth, Czechs and Germans: A Study of the Struggle in the Historic Provinces of Bohemia and Moravia, 2nd edn., London, 1967.
