= Dewsbury (constituency) =

Parliamentary constituency in the United Kingdom, 1868-2024

- Former county constituency for the House of Commons
- 2010–2024 boundary of Dewsbury in West Yorkshire

- Location of West Yorkshire within England
- County: West Yorkshire
- Electorate: 81,912 (December 2019)
- Major settlements: Dewsbury, Mirfield, Kirkburton, Denby Dale

1868–2024
- Seats: One
- Created from: Northern West Riding of Yorkshire
- Replaced by: Dewsbury and Batley; Ossett and Denby Dale (part); Spen Valley (part)

Dewsbury was a constituency (Note: A county constituency (for the purposes of election expenses and type of returning officer)) created in 1868 and abolished in 2024. (Note: As with all constituencies, the constituency elects one Member of Parliament (MP) by the first past the post system of election at least every five years.)

After 2023 Periodic Review of Westminster constituencies, the seat was abolished and replaced by the newly created Dewsbury and Batley constituency (with major boundary changes).

== History ==
Summary of results

Dewsbury's seat dates back to 1868 and the electorate has usually given the winning MP marginal majorities which means it is a marginal seat. Labour MPs served the seat from 1935 until 1983 and again from 1987. In 2010 it was gained by Simon Reevell, a Conservative.

Other parties results

One of the five other parties' candidates standing in 2015 kept their deposit, by winning more than 5% of the vote in 2015, UKIP's Thackray, who emulated the national swing of +9.5% by an entry candidature, polling 12.4% of the vote.

Turnout

Turnout since 1918 has ranged between 87.9% of the vote in 1950, to 58.8% in 2001.

== Boundaries ==
Map of boundaries 2010-2024

1868–1885: The townships of Dewsbury, Batley, and Soothill.

1918–1950: The County Borough of Dewsbury.

1950–1955: The County Borough of Dewsbury, the Municipal Borough of Ossett, and the Urban Districts of Heckmondwike and Mirfield.

1955–1983: The County Borough of Dewsbury, the Municipal Borough of Ossett, and the Urban District of Mirfield.

1983–1997: The Borough of Kirklees wards of Denby Dale, Dewsbury East, Dewsbury West, Kirkburton, Mirfield, and Thornhill.

1997–2010: The Borough of Kirklees wards of Dewsbury East, Dewsbury West, Heckmondwike, Mirfield, and Thornhill.

2010–2024: The Borough of Kirklees wards of Denby Dale, Dewsbury East, Dewsbury South, Dewsbury West, Kirkburton, and Mirfield.

The constituency covers the towns of Dewsbury and Mirfield, and the surrounding areas.

In the 2010 redistribution, the constituency lost the Labour-leaning ward of Heckmondwike, but gained the Conservative-leaning wards of Denby Dale and Kirkburton.

== Constituency profile ==
The seat has a substantial Muslim population in the town of Dewsbury (particularly the Savile Town district), combined a few suburban and rural affluent parts such as Denby Dale, Mirfield, and Kirkburton. The town of Dewsbury itself is strongly Labour, and the remaining wards mostly Conservative. Overall the seat has close to national average income and several developments have desirable views as the upland town cuts into the Pennines. Relatively few people rely upon social housing, however the Dewsbury East ward contains a high proportion of social housing in the Chickenley estate, while Dewsbury South contains the Thornhill area, where the local school was the subject of the acclaimed Educating Yorkshire series. In the light of increasing concern over Muslim extremism, the Labour Party candidate Shahid Malik enjoyed a fairly large public media profile after his victory in 2005, with various TV appearances and interviews, strongly denouncing believers in and adherents of such views; however, this has also been a strong area for the British National Party, who obtained their highest vote in Britain (13.1%) in the 2005 general election, much of it taken at the Labour Party's expense. They have also had a substantial vote at local level, when in 2006 for the first time in the UK the BNP polled more votes than any other party standing. However, at the 2010 general election, the BNP's popularity in Dewsbury fell (despite a substantial nationwide rise in support for the party compared to five years previously) and they gained a mere 6% of the vote.

== Members of Parliament ==
Election	Member	Party
1868	Sir John Simon	Liberal
1888 by-election	Mark Oldroyd	Liberal
1902 by-election	Walter Runciman	Liberal
1918	Emil Pickering	Coalition Conservative
1922	Benjamin Riley	Labour
1923	Edmund Harvey	Liberal
1924	Benjamin Riley	Labour
1931	Walter Rea	Liberal
1935	Benjamin Riley	Labour
1945	Will Paling	Labour
1959	David Ginsburg	Labour
1981	David Ginsburg	Social Democrat
1983	John Whitfield	Conservative
1987	Ann Taylor	Labour
2005	Shahid Malik	Labour
2010	Simon Reevell	Conservative
2015	Paula Sherriff	Labour
2019	Mark Eastwood	Conservative
2024	Constituency abolished	

== Election results 1868–2024 ==
=== Elections in the 1860s ===
1868 General Election: Dewsbury
Party	Candidate	Votes	%	±%
Liberal	John Simon	3,392	53.7	
Liberal	Handel Cossham	2,923	46.3	
Majority		469	7.4	
Turnout		6,315	89.3	
Registered electors		7,072		
Liberal win (new seat)				

=== Elections in the 1870s ===
1874 General Election: Dewsbury
Party	Candidate	Votes	%	±%
Liberal	John Simon	3,706	52.9	−0.8
Liberal	John Charles Cox	3,272	46.7	+0.4
Conservative	William Henry Colbeck	26	0.4	New
Majority		434	6.2	−1.2
Turnout		7,004	79.6	−9.7
Registered electors		8,803		
Liberal hold		Swing	−0.6	

=== Elections in the 1880s ===
1880 general election: Dewsbury
Party	Candidate	Votes	%	±%
Liberal	John Simon	3,599	42.6	−10.3
Liberal	William Hoyle	3,254	38.6	−8.1
Conservative	Alfred Austin	1,586	18.8	+18.4
Majority		345	4.0	−2.2
Turnout		8,439	84.7	+5.1
Registered electors		9,960		
Liberal hold		Swing	−1.1	

1885 general election: Dewsbury
Party	Candidate	Votes	%	±%
Liberal	John Simon	6,124	62.6	+20.0
Conservative	Joseph Fox	3,664	37.4	+18.6
Majority		2,460	25.2	+21.2
Turnout		9,788	85.6	+0.9
Registered electors		11,439		
Liberal hold		Swing	+0.7	

1886 general election: Dewsbury
Party	Candidate	Votes	%	±%
Liberal	John Simon	5,118	65.0	+2.4
Conservative	Joseph Samuel Colefax	2,759	35.0	−2.4
Majority		2,359	30.0	+4.8
Turnout		7,877	68.9	−16.7
Registered electors		11,439		
Liberal hold		Swing	+2.4	

Mark Oldroyd

1888 Dewsbury by-election
Party	Candidate	Votes	%	±%
Liberal	Mark Oldroyd	6,071	60.5	−4.5
Liberal Unionist	H. O. Arnold-Forster	3,969	39.5	+4.5
Majority		2,102	21.0	−9.0
Turnout		10,040	85.3	+16.4
Registered electors		11,767		
Liberal hold		Swing	−4.5	

- Caused by Simon's resignation.

=== Elections in the 1890s ===
General election 1892: Dewsbury
Party	Candidate	Votes	%	±%
Liberal	Mark Oldroyd	5,759	61.1	−3.9
Conservative	Henry Cautley	3,670	38.9	+3.9
Majority		2,089	22.2	−7.8
Turnout		9,429	80.1	+11.2
Registered electors		11,768		
Liberal hold		Swing	−3.9	

General election 1895: Dewsbury
Party	Candidate	Votes	%	±%
Liberal	Mark Oldroyd	5,379	52.0	−9.1
Conservative	Henry Cautley	3,875	37.5	−1.4
Ind. Labour Party	Edward Hartley	1,080	10.5	New
Majority		1,504	14.5	−7.7
Turnout		10,334	84.9	+4.8
Registered electors		12,167		
Liberal hold		Swing	−3.9	

=== Elections in the 1900s ===
General election 1900: Dewsbury
Party	Candidate	Votes	%	±%
Liberal	Mark Oldroyd	6,045	60.8	+8.8
Conservative	Forbes St John Morrow	3,897	39.2	+1.7
Majority		2,148	21.6	+7.1
Turnout		9,942	74.8	−10.1
Registered electors		13,296		
Liberal hold		Swing	+3.6	

Walter Runciman

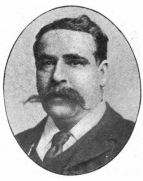
Harry Quelch

1902 Dewsbury by-election
Party	Candidate	Votes	%	±%
Liberal	Walter Runciman	5,660	48.1	−12.7
Conservative	Joe Haley	4,512	38.3	−0.9
Social Democratic Federation	Harry Quelch	1,597	13.6	New
Majority		1,148	9.8	−11.8
Turnout		11,769	87.3	+12.5
Registered electors		13,476		
Liberal hold		Swing	−5.9	

General election 1906: Dewsbury
Party	Candidate	Votes	%	±%
Liberal	Walter Runciman	6,764	54.7	−6.1
Conservative	W. B. Boyd-Carpenter	2,959	24.0	−15.2
Labour Repr. Cmte.	Ben Turner	2,629	21.3	New
Majority		3,805	30.7	+9.1
Turnout		12,352	88.5	+13.7
Registered electors		13,951		
Liberal hold		Swing	+4.6	

1908 Dewsbury by-election
Party	Candidate	Votes	%	±%
Liberal	Walter Runciman	5,594	46.1	−8.6
Conservative	W. B. Boyd-Carpenter	4,078	33.7	+9.7
Labour	Ben Turner	2,446	20.2	−1.1
Majority		1,516	12.4	−18.3
Turnout		12,118	86.2	−2.3
Registered electors		14,056		
Liberal hold		Swing	−9.2	

=== Elections in the 1910s ===
General election January 1910: Dewsbury
Party	Candidate	Votes	%	±%
Liberal	Walter Runciman	7,882	62.4	+7.7
Conservative	B. Dent	4,747	37.6	+13.6
Majority		3,315	24.8	−5.9
Turnout		12,629	87.8	−0.7
Liberal hold		Swing	−3.1	

General election December 1910: Dewsbury
Party	Candidate	Votes	%	±%
Liberal	Walter Runciman	7,061	63.6	+1.2
Conservative	Edward Overend Simpson	4,033	36.4	−1.2
Majority		3,028	27.2	+2.4
Turnout		11,094	77.1	−10.7
Registered electors		14,389		
Liberal hold		Swing	+1.2	

General election 1918: Dewsbury
Party		Candidate	Votes	%	±%
C	Unionist	Emil Pickering	7,853	42.3	+5.9
	Labour	Benjamin Riley	5,596	30.1	New
	Liberal	Walter Runciman	5,130	27.6	−36.0
Majority			2,257	12.2	N/A
Turnout			18,579	67.3	−9.8
Registered electors			27,592		
	Unionist gain from Liberal		Swing	+21.0	
C indicates candidate endorsed by the coalition government.

=== Elections in the 1920s ===
General election 1922: Dewsbury
Party	Candidate	Votes	%	±%
Labour	Benjamin Riley	8,821	37.3	+7.2
Liberal	Edmund Harvey	8,065	34.1	+5.5
Unionist	Osbert Peake	6,744	28.5	−13.8
Majority		756	3.2	N/A
Turnout		23,630	83.9	+16.6
Labour gain from Unionist		Swing		

General election 1923: Dewsbury
Party	Candidate	Votes	%	±%
Liberal	Edmund Harvey	11,179	55.6	+21.5
Labour	Benjamin Riley	8,923	44.4	+13.1
Majority		2,256	11.2	N/A
Turnout		20,102	70.7	−13.2
Liberal gain from Labour		Swing		

General election 1924: Dewsbury
Party	Candidate	Votes	%	±%
Labour	Benjamin Riley	9,941	41.1	−3.3
Unionist	Frederick Walter Skelsey	7,516	31.1	New
Liberal	Edmund Harvey	6,723	27.8	−27.8
Majority		2,425	10.0	N/A
Turnout		28,677	84.3	+13.6
Labour gain from Liberal		Swing		

General election 1929: Dewsbury
Party	Candidate	Votes	%	±%
Labour	Benjamin Riley	14,420	46.2	+5.1
Liberal	Ronald Walker	10,607	34.0	+6.2
Unionist	JWW Shuttleworth	6,175	19.8	−11.3
Majority		3,813	12.2	+2.2
Turnout		36,250	86.1	+1.8
Labour hold		Swing		

=== Elections in the 1930s ===
General election 1931: Dewsbury
Party	Candidate	Votes	%	±%
Liberal	Walter Rea	19,463	63.68	+29.68
Labour	Benjamin Riley	11,101	36.32	−9.88
Majority		8,362	27.36	N/A
Turnout		30,564	84.23	−1.88
Liberal gain from Labour		Swing		

General election 1935: Dewsbury
Party	Candidate	Votes	%	±%
Labour	Benjamin Riley	14,066	47.21	+10.89
National Labour	John Fennell	8,798	29.53	New
Liberal	Walter Rea	6,933	23.27	−40.41
Majority		5,268	17.68	N/A
Turnout		29,797	80.81	−3.42
Labour gain from Liberal		Swing		

General Election 1939–40:

Another General Election was due to take place before the end of 1940. The political parties had been making preparations for an election to take place from 1939 and by the end of this year, the following candidates had been selected:

- Labour: Benjamin Riley
- Liberal: Ronald Walker
- Liberal National:Richard Soper

=== Elections in the 1940s ===
General election 1945: Dewsbury
Party	Candidate	Votes	%	±%
Labour	William Paling	16,330	56.3	+9.1
National Liberal	Ernest Eric Ritchie Kilner	8,674	29.9	N/A
Liberal	Thomas Mercer Banks	4,023	13.9	−9.4
Majority		7,656	26.4	+8.7
Turnout		29,027	80.3	−0.5
Labour hold		Swing		

=== Elections in the 1950s ===
General election 1950: Dewsbury
Party	Candidate	Votes	%	±%
Labour	William Paling	29,341	53.6	−2.7
Conservative	James Ramsden	18,076	33.0	+3.1
Liberal	Granville Slack	7,323	13.4	−0.5
Majority		11,265	20.6	−5.8
Turnout		54,740	87.9	+7.6
Labour hold		Swing	-2.9	

General election 1951: Dewsbury
Party	Candidate	Votes	%	±%
Labour	William Paling	28,650	53.3	−0.3
National Liberal	James Ramsden	19,562	36.4	+3.4
Liberal	Joseph Snowden	5,584	10.4	−3.0
Majority		9,088	16.9	−3.7
Turnout		53,796	85.8	−2.1
Labour hold		Swing		

General election 1955: Dewsbury
Party	Candidate	Votes	%	±%
Labour	William Paling	23,286	52.1	−1.2
Conservative	Michael Shaw	15,869	35.5	−0.9
Liberal	Joseph Snowden	5,516	12.4	+2.0
Majority		7,417	16.6	−0.3
Turnout		44,671	80.8	−5.0
Labour hold		Swing		

General election 1959: Dewsbury
Party	Candidate	Votes	%	±%
Labour	David Ginsburg	20,870	46.0	−6.1
Conservative	Marcus Fox	17,201	37.9	+2.4
Liberal	John M McLusky	7,321	16.1	+3.7
Majority		3,669	7.1	−8.5
Turnout		45,392	82.7	+1.9
Labour hold		Swing	-4.3	

=== Elections in the 1960s ===
General election 1964: Dewsbury
Party	Candidate	Votes	%	±%
Labour	David Ginsburg	21,284	48.4	+2.4
Conservative	Barbara M Garden	15,046	34.2	−3.7
Liberal	Alan Allsop	7,679	17.5	+1.4
Majority		6,238	14.2	+6.1
Turnout		44,009	79.5	−3.2
Labour hold		Swing	+3.1	

General election 1966: Dewsbury
Party	Candidate	Votes	%	±%
Labour	David Ginsburg	23,027	53.6	+5.2
Conservative	Donald H Haynes	12,361	28.8	−5.4
Liberal	Alan Allsop	7,593	17.7	+0.2
Majority		10,666	24.8	+10.6
Turnout		42,981	77.9	−1.6
Labour hold		Swing	+5.3	

=== Elections in the 1970s ===
General election 1970: Dewsbury
Party	Candidate	Votes	%	±%
Labour	David Ginsburg	22,015	48.7	−4.9
Conservative	John M. Stanfield	17,468	38.7	+9.9
Liberal	Alan Allsop	5,688	12.6	−5.1
Majority		4,547	10.0	−14.8
Turnout		45,171	74.5	−3.4
Labour hold		Swing	-7.4	

General election February 1974: Dewsbury
Party	Candidate	Votes	%	±%
Labour	David Ginsburg	21,186	42.5	−6.2
Conservative	Ivor James Humphrey	15,774	31.6	−7.1
Liberal	Alan Allsop	12,889	25.9	+13.3
Majority		5,412	10.9	+0.9
Turnout		49,859	81.8	+7.3
Labour hold		Swing	+0.4	

General election October 1974: Dewsbury
Party	Candidate	Votes	%	±%
Labour	David Ginsburg	20,378	45.4	+2.9
Conservative	Marguerite Elizabeth Liversidge Wood	13,477	30.1	−1.5
Liberal	Alan Allsop	10,991	24.5	−1.4
Majority		6,901	15.3	+4.4
Turnout		44,846	72.9	−8.9
Labour hold		Swing	+2.3	

General election 1979: Dewsbury
Party	Candidate	Votes	%	±%
Labour	David Ginsburg	22,829	46.7	+1.3
Conservative	Roy Galley	18,448	37.8	+7.7
Liberal	Neil Philip Derbyshire	7,580	15.5	−9.0
Majority		4,381	8.9	−6.4
Turnout		48,857	77.1	+4.2
Labour hold		Swing	−3.2	

=== Elections in the 1980s ===
General election 1983: Dewsbury
Party	Candidate	Votes	%	±%
Conservative	John Whitfield	20,297	39.4	+1.6
Labour	Denis Ripley	18,211	35.3	−11.4
SDP	David Ginsburg	13,065	25.3	+9.8
Majority		2,086	4.1	N/A
Turnout		51,573	70.8	−6.3
Conservative gain from Labour		Swing	+6.5	

General election 1987: Dewsbury
Party	Candidate	Votes	%	±%
Labour	Ann Taylor	23,668	42.4	+7.1
Conservative	John Whitfield	23,223	41.6	+2.2
SDP	Alan Mills	8,907	16.0	−9.3
Majority		445	0.8	N/A
Turnout		55,798	78.8	+8.0
Labour gain from Conservative		Swing	+2.4	

=== Elections in the 1990s ===
General election 1992: Dewsbury
Party	Candidate	Votes	%	±%
Labour	Ann Taylor	25,596	43.8	+1.4
Conservative	John Whitfield	24,962	42.7	+1.1
Liberal Democrats	Robert Meadowcroft	6,570	11.3	−4.7
BNP	Jane Birdwood	660	1.1	New
Green	Neil Denby	471	0.8	New
Natural Law	Janet Marsden	146	0.3	New
Majority		634	1.1	+0.3
Turnout		58,405	80.2	+2.4
Labour hold		Swing	+0.2	

General election 1997: Dewsbury
Party	Candidate	Votes	%	±%
Labour	Ann Taylor	21,286	49.4	+2.1
Conservative	Paul McCormick	12,963	30.1	−9.9
Liberal Democrats	Kingsley Hill	4,422	10.3	+0.4
BNP	Frances Taylor	2,232	5.2	+4.1
Referendum	Wendy Golf	1,019	2.4	New
Independent Labour	David Daniel	770	1.8	New
Green	Ian McCourtie	383	0.9	+0.1
Majority		8,323	19.3	+18.2
Turnout		43,905	70.0	−10.2
Labour hold		Swing	+6.0	

- Swing in 1997 is based on notional figures as the seat had been redrawn prior to the election.

=== Elections in the 2000s ===
General election 2001: Dewsbury
Party	Candidate	Votes	%	±%
Labour	Ann Taylor	18,524	50.5	+1.1
Conservative	Robert Cole	11,075	30.2	+0.1
Liberal Democrats	Ian Cuthbertson	4,382	12.0	+1.7
BNP	Russell Smith	1,632	4.5	−0.7
Green	Brenda Smithson	560	1.5	+0.6
UKIP	David Peace	478	1.3	New
Majority		7,449	20.3	+1.0
Turnout		36,651	58.8	−11.2
Labour hold		Swing	+0.5	

General election 2005: Dewsbury
Party	Candidate	Votes	%	±%
Labour	Shahid Malik	15,807	41.0	−9.5
Conservative	Sayeeda Warsi	11,192	29.0	−1.2
Liberal Democrats	Kingsley Hill	5,624	14.6	+2.6
BNP	David Exley	5,066	13.1	+8.6
Green	Brenda Smithson	593	1.5	0.0
Independent	Alan Girvan	313	0.8	New
Majority		3,615	12.0	−8.3
Turnout		38,595	62.0	+3.2
Labour hold		Swing	−4.2	

=== Elections in the 2010s ===
General election 2010: Dewsbury
Party	Candidate	Votes	%	±%
Conservative	Simon Reevell	18,898	35.0	+3.3
Labour	Shahid Malik	17,372	32.2	−8.4
Liberal Democrats	Andrew Hutchinson	9,150	16.9	+3.2
Independent	Khizar Iqbal	3,813	7.1	New
BNP	Roger Roberts	3,265	6.0	−7.1
Green	Adrian Cruden	849	1.6	+0.1
English Democrat	Michael Felse	661	1.2	New
Majority		1,526	2.8	N/A
Turnout		54,008	68.5	+6.5
Conservative gain from Labour		Swing	-4.6	

General election 2015: Dewsbury
Party	Candidate	Votes	%	±%
Labour	Paula Sherriff	22,406	41.8	+9.6
Conservative	Simon Reevell	20,955	39.1	+4.1
UKIP	Mark Thackray	6,649	12.4	New
Liberal Democrats	Ednan Hussain	1,924	3.6	−13.3
Green	Adrian Cruden	1,366	2.5	+0.9
Yorkshire First	Richard Carter	236	0.4	New
CPA	Steve Hakes	94	0.2	New
Majority		1,451	2.7	N/A
Turnout		53,630	67.2	−1.3
Labour gain from Conservative		Swing	+2.8	

General election 2017: Dewsbury
Party	Candidate	Votes	%	±%
Labour	Paula Sherriff	28,814	51.0	+9.2
Conservative	Beth Prescott	25,493	45.1	+6.0
Liberal Democrats	Ednan Hussain	1,214	2.1	−1.5
Green	Simon Cope	1,024	1.8	−0.7
Majority		3,321	5.9	+3.2
Turnout		56,545	69.5	+2.3
Labour hold		Swing	+1.6	

General election 2019: Dewsbury
Party	Candidate	Votes	%	±%
Conservative	Mark Eastwood	26,179	46.4	+1.3
Labour	Paula Sherriff	24,618	43.7	−7.3
Liberal Democrats	John Rossington	2,406	4.3	+2.2
Brexit Party	Philip James	1,874	3.3	New
Green	Simon Cope	1,060	1.9	+0.1
Monster Raving Loony	Sir Archibald Earl Eaton Stanton	252	0.4	New
Majority		1,561	2.7	N/A
Turnout		56,389	69.4	−0.1
Conservative gain from Labour		Swing	+4.3	

== See also ==
- List of parliamentary constituencies in West Yorkshire

== Sources ==
- Craig, F. W. S. (1983) [1969]. British parliamentary election results 1918–1949 (3rd ed.). Chichester: Parliamentary Research Services. ISBN 0-900178-06-X.
