= James Gribble =

British trade unionist and socialist activist

James Gribble (12 January 1868 – 14 August 1934) was a British trade unionist and socialist activist.

Gribble worked as a bootmaker from the age of twelve, following in his father's trade. He served in the British Army for eight years from 1885, then returned to bootmaking in Northampton. He became active in the National Union of Boot and Shoe Operatives (NUBSO), and also joined the Social Democratic Federation (SDF), and in 1897 launched a local SDF newspaper, the Pioneer.

In 1902, Gribble took a full-time organisers' post with NUBSO, and he also served on the union's executive. The following year, he was elected to Northampton Town Council, but the following year, he was involved in a physical disagreement in the council chamber, and served a month in prison. Despite this, he was elected as a local Poor Law Guardian and served several further terms on the town council.

Gribble founded the Pioneer Boot Works in 1904, to raise money for the SDF, and worked as its manager from 1905 until 1914. He stood in the 1906 and January 1910 general elections in Northampton, but was unsuccessful on both occasions.

Gribble supported British involvement in World War I, creating the Northampton Allied War Fund and serving on the local appeals tribunal. He followed H. M. Hyndman in leaving the SDF's successor, the British Socialist Party, to found a new National Socialist Party, but became less politically active. From 1923, he served as a magistrate.

Party political offices
Preceded by Peter Walker	President of the Social Democratic Federation; 1905	Succeeded by Edward Hartley
