= Mark Oldroyd =

British politician

- Mark Oldroyd

Member of Parliament for Dewsbury
- In office 1888–1902

Mayor of Dewsbury
- In office ?–?

Personal details
- Born: 30 May 1843
- Died: 5 July 1927 (aged 84)
- Party: Liberal
- Education: New College London

Sir Mark Oldroyd (30 May 1843 – 5 July 1927) was a British woollen manufacturer and Liberal Party politician from West Riding of Yorkshire.

== Biography ==
Oldroyd was born the youngest of three sons and two daughters of Mark Oldroyd and his wife Rachel. He was educated initially at a small school in Dewsbury, followed by a spell at Batley Grammar School. He then trained as a minister at New College London, but he did not pursue his vocation and returned to Dewsbury in 1862, getting a job at the family woollen firm.

In 1871 he married Maria Mewburn, with whom he had no children however, he did have illegitimate children with a single mistress who was one of his mill girls and now has many descendants. In 1874 the family company was publicly floated for £750,000 in £10 shares, with Mark and his brother John running the firm as life directors, presiding over a merger with Blakeley & Latta, a blanket company. In 1877 John got into financial difficulties and was forced to leave the company, putting Mark in charge of rebuilding and managing the business, which he did with great success. By the 1880s the business's blanket works near Leeds was manufacturing 1000 pairs of blankets a day, and four factories in Dewsbury were making between 7000 and 8,000 yards (7,300 m) of broadcloth a day. By 1888 the company employed 2000 people on 18 acres (73,000 m^{2}) of mill floor space, and had invested in a pair of collieries at Castleford, which supplied coal for the textile industry. In World War II the company made army and navy uniforms.

In 1888 he was also elected Member of Parliament for Dewsbury as a Liberal, having been a card-carrying member since 1866. He had previously been a town councillor, Alderman, a borough magistrate and one-time Mayor of Dewsbury. His parliamentary attendance was infrequent, but was actively involved in trade and industry-related committees. In 1902 he resigned from Parliament to concentrate on business interests, and he was knighted in 1909. Local and national commitments diverted Mark's attentions from the company, and he resigned his life directorship in 1913.

Sir Mark was also a philanthropist who donated money for the building of local places of worship, schools and the first local hospital.

Parliament of the United Kingdom
Preceded by Sir John Simon	Member of Parliament for Dewsbury; 1888–1902	Succeeded by Walter Runciman
