= Frank Ashton-Gwatkin =

British diplomat and writer (1889–1976)

Frank Trelawny Arthur Ashton-Gwatkin CB CMG (14 April 1889 – 30 January 1976) was a British diplomat and Foreign Office official. He was a significant influence on the British foreign policy in the East Asia in the early 20th century. He also published a number of novels and other works under the pseudonym John Paris.

Ashton-Gwatkin was educated at Eton College and Balliol College, Oxford.

In 1915 he married Nancy Violet Butler (d. 1953), of Melbourne, Australia.

After several years in the Consular Service in East Asia, where he acquired a good knowledge of Japanese, Ashton-Gwatkin joined the Far Eastern Department of the Foreign Office in 1919, transferring to the Diplomatic Service in 1921. In 1929, he was sent to the Soviet Union to work at the British Embassy in Moscow, but returned after a year to be secretary of the Anglo-Soviet Debt Committee under Lord Goschen.

He participated in several international conferences, including the Imperial Economic Conference in Ottawa in 1932 and the World Economic Conference in London the following year. As a result of his interest in economic affairs, he was instrumental in establishing the Economic Relations Section in the Foreign Office, focused on co-ordinating British diplomatic and economic policies, becoming its first head in 1934. In the late summer of 1938, he served as Chief of Staff on the Runciman Mission to Czechoslovakia and was a member of the British delegation at the subsequent Munich Conference.

During the 1930s, Ashton-Gwatkin was a staunch advocate of the policy of appeasement towards Nazi Germany. Although he later revised his views, Ashton-Gwatkin's political outlook at that time is encapsulated by his expressed hope - in the immediate aftermath of the Munich Agreement in 1938 - of “an Anglo-German policy of economic co-operation” flourishing within a German-dominated East Central Europe.

Ashton-Gwatkin's literary work, published under the name of John Paris, reflected his period of residence in Japan and included the novels Kimono (1921), Sayonara (1924), Banzai! (1925), The Island beyond Japan (1929), Matsu (1932) and a collection of verses A Japanese Don Juan and other Poems (1926). The novels were noted for their realistic portrayal of life in East Asia. Previously, whilst an undergraduate at Oxford, he had been awarded the 1909 Newdigate Prize for a poem entitled Michelangelo.
