= 1902 Dewsbury by-election =

UK parliamentary by-election

- 28 January 1902

Candidate	Runciman	Haley	Quelch
Party	Liberal	Conservative	Social Democratic Federation
Popular vote	5,660	4,512	1,597
Percentage	48.1%	38.3%	13.6%
MP before election
Mark Oldroyd
Liberal
Subsequent MP
Walter Runciman
Liberal

The 1902 Dewsbury by-election was a by-election held in England on 28 January 1902 for the UK House of Commons constituency of Dewsbury in the West Riding of Yorkshire.

== Vacancy ==
The by-election was caused by the resignation of the sitting Liberal Member of Parliament (MP), Mark Oldroyd. Oldroyd, a woollen manufacturer, had first been elected for Dewsbury at a by-election in 1888. In September 1901, Oldroyd announced his intention to stand down. In his letter of resignation, Oldroyd cited ill-health as the principal cause of his decision, stating that the coming session of Parliament, in what he called the 'extraordinary and complex state of politics' would require regular attendance and many late night sittings. Oldroyd had not been one of the most diligent of attenders in the House of Commons having many demands on his time as the head of a great manufacturing concern. Despite his cries of ill-health however, Oldroyd continued to run his giant business, (albeit scaling down his responsibilities as the years progressed), until he retired in as Chairman in 1920. He was knighted in 1909.

== Seat ==
Dewsbury was a safe Liberal seat. It had been Liberal since its creation in 1868, reflecting the predominantly urban and industrial nature of the constituency. Oldroyd had held the seat with over 50% of the poll at each election since his by-election win in 1888 and his majority over the Conservatives at the previous general election in 1900 was 2,148, having taken 60.8% of the poll.

General election 1900: Dewsbury
Party	Candidate	Votes	%	±%
Liberal	Mark Oldroyd	6,045	60.1	
Conservative	F. St J. Morrow	3,897	39.2	
Majority		2,148	20.9	
Turnout		9,942	20.2	
Liberal hold		Swing		

== Candidates ==
=== Labour ===
A candidate dedicated to the labour interest had contested Dewsbury only once since the seat's creation in 1868. In 1895, Edward Hartley stood for the Independent Labour Party, the ILP, coming third with just 10.5% of the poll.

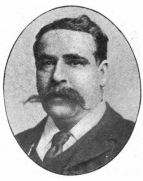
Harry Quelch

However, by the time Oldroyd decided to resign, the Labour Representation Committee had been formed and the future Labour Party announced their intention to bring forward a candidate. Their possible candidates included Edward Hartley, Ben Turner from Batley, J A Parr, a Justice of the Peace also from Batley and Peter Francis Curran, a Glasgow-born trade union official from London, who was later Labour MP for Jarrow. The local Labour Party and affiliated trade unions found themselves in financial difficulty however and could not afford to run a candidate of their own. It was reported that a journalist from London, the editor of the publication Justice, Harry Quelch, one of Britain's first Marxists, had arranged a well-attended public meeting in Dewsbury market-place. As a result, he was said to have gained the support of the Dewsbury working-men. Quelch was duly nominated as the candidate of the Social Democratic Federation (SDF).

In early October 1901, the Press Association received a communication from the Parliamentary committee of the Trades Union Congress to the effect that Sam Woods, a leading light in the Miners Federation and Lib-Lab MP for Ince (1892–95) and for Walthamstow (1897–1900), had been approached unofficially to stand as Lib-Lab candidate in Dewsbury. Woods indicated he would be willing to do so if formally invited by the Liberals and the trades council.

Other sections of organised labour nevertheless kept up their search for a candidate and election funding for a while longer. A special meeting of the Dewsbury and District Labour council was held on 22 October 1901 and four men were invited to put their names forward to a joint conference of the Trades Council, the ILP and what was described as "other progressive bodies" with a view to the adoption of one of them as Trade Union and Socialist candidate at the by-election. The favoured men did not include Sam Woods and the Trades Unions obviously had a preference for the candidature of Edward Hartley. They called on the Labour Representation Committee to arbitrate with the SDF to secure a candidate whose nomination was agreed by the united forces of labour.

In the end it seems that both the ILP and the Labour Party were obliged to bow to the inevitable and support Quelch to avoid splitting the labour vote. The Labour Party were indignant enough to put out a statement calling it 'sharp practice' on the part of the SDF to go forward with Quelch's nomination without the consent of all the groups representing organised labour. It was disunity of this kind which the Labour Representation Committee had been formed to eliminate. Such disputes increasingly disappeared in the years leading up to the 1906 general election, reinforcing Labour as the growing force in British politics but in 1901–02 in Dewsbury there was not yet any such harmony.

=== Conservatives ===
The first man the Conservative Party wished to consider was George Sheard, a Batley JP and one of the town's successful "shoddy barons" who headed his own cloth manufacturing firm. Mr Sheard had apparently been approached to stand as a Conservative candidate a number of times but had always declined. If he turned them down again (as indeed he chose to do on the grounds of advancing age) they were likely to turn to either, Joe Haley, a three time Mayor of Dewsbury, Alderman Edmund Kilburn, JP who had also been Mayor of Dewsbury on two occasions, or, although not a local man, to Forbes St John Morrow, a barrister, the candidate opposing Oldroyd at the 1900 general election, and later to serve as Municipal Reform member on the London County Council between 1907–1922. Later, a new name was also put forward, that of Frank Whiteley. Whiteley had been mayor of Mafeking in South Africa during the famous Boer War siege.

Eventually however the Dewsbury Conservatives selected Joe Haley as their man. Haley was by profession a blanket and rug manufacturer with the firm of Hepworth and Haley of Dewsbury and Mirfield, one of the oldest such businesses in the area and one which employed several hundred workers. A former Mayor of the town, he had recently stepped down from being a member of the council. He formally accepted nomination as candidate in a letter to the president of Dewsbury Conservative and Unionist Association, Major Fox, on Christmas Day 1901.

=== Liberals ===
Walter Runciman

With Dewsbury being a hitherto safe Liberal seat, the likelihood was that the local party would be spoiled for choice for potential candidates. It was reported that a number of local worthies were in line for consideration including Mr E Talbot, a member of the local school board, Alderman J Anty of Batley (described as an extreme teetotaler), Mr G Thorpe a director of the Cooperative Wholesale Society, Mr J Brown a chemical manufacturer from Savile Town and Mr W Wilson JP, a card manufacturer from Mirfield. So the local Association clearly felt they should take their time before coming to a decision. On meeting in early October 1901 they confined themselves to passing a resolution thanking Oldroyd for past services and regretting his decision to resign. They did not seem to have been attracted to the idea of inviting Sam Woods to stand as a Lib-Lab.

The ambitions of any local Liberals were soon scuppered also, as the Dewsbury Liberal Association turned its attentions to Walter Runciman, a businessman from Newcastle upon Tyne and had soon invited him to be their candidate. Runciman was the son of another Walter Runciman, a shipping magnate who would also go on to be a Liberal MP. Runciman had gone into the family shipping business and he had married into another industrial Liberal family, that of James Cochran Stevenson. He had been Liberal MP for Oldham, winning a by-election there in 1898 but lost the seat at the general election of 1900 being beaten by Winston Churchill.

== Campaign ==
Runciman began his campaign with a public meeting in Dewsbury. While supporting the prosecution of the Boer War, he attacked the government's handling of it, accusing them of a policy of drift which could not deliver a decisive military victory, the foundation for a lasting peace. He also attacked the government on coal tax, sugar tax and the Agricultural Rates Act. He said that as government expenditure rose there was a danger that there might be a tax on wheat in the next budget. Finally, he declared himself as still being fully in favour of Irish home rule. According to reports, it seemed Runciman and his messages were being well received and that he had received the support of a number of local Labour leaders. As the campaign wore on, it was reported as a given that Runciman could count on the miners' vote and that of the Irish community, which taken together was estimated to be worth about 1500 votes; the executive committee of the local Irish community having formally voted to endorse Runciman. However, it was by no means certain that the miners would endorse the Liberal candidate. The previous Liberal MP had gone against the miners by opposing the eight-hour day, nationalisation and the abolition of fines, which he thought would lessen discipline in the industry and the local trades council refused to recommend any candidate to their members.

The Unionists did not open their campaign proper until January 1902, with Haley addressing meetings first in Dewsbury and then in other parts of the constituency. It was reported that they had held a large number of organisational meetings over the period since the announcement of Oldroyd's resignation and that, despite the large Liberal majority last time, they had a chance of capturing the seat. Haley sought to build on his reputation as a strong local candidate, a large employer of labour in the district who therefore knew the local economic and industrial conditions well. His hand-bills described him as 'home-made' as opposed to Runciman, who was called a 'carpet-bagger' and a 'stranger' to Dewsbury. He supported the war and his views on education and temperance were said to be going down well with his audiences.

Quelch's supporters were initially quite buoyant. Their candidate had been on the ground in the constituency for longer than Runciman or Haley and they claimed he was gaining ground. By January however it was being reported that despite the vigour of the SDF campaign, their public meetings were not being well attended but by the middle of the month Quelch's events were attracting larger numbers, although it was believed they found his socialist views too advanced or extreme. In his election address Quelch proposed the nationalisation of the land and railways as well as the mines. He spoke in support of the Boers, opening himself to accusations of a lack of patriotism and fell out with the local nonconformists over a book he had jointly authored which was interpreted as advocating free love. It seemed too that SDF support was not widespread enough to enable them to undertake a full canvas of the constituency, with some districts being neglected entirely due to lack of manpower. It was clear that the history of disunity in the labour movement was preventing Quelch from making the impact he needed, the working class Irish vote was following the lead of its political organisers and supporting Runciman not Quelch and a lack of funds was making it difficult for him to campaign as extensively as he wanted.

== Election formalities ==
The Writ of election writ for the by-election was not moved in Parliament until Friday 17 January 1902 and formal nominations were received and accepted on 23 January. Polling took place on Tuesday 28 January.

== Result ==
The result was a win for Runciman. This was a reduction in the Liberal majority from the general election of 1900 and on a higher turnout but that had not been a three-cornered contest.

Dewsbury by-election, 1902
Party	Candidate	Votes	%	±%
Liberal	Walter Runciman	5,660	48.1	−12.0
Conservative	Joe Haley	4,512	38.3	−0.9
Social Democratic Federation	Harry Quelch	1,597	13.6	New
Majority		1,148	9.8	−10.4
Turnout		11,769	87.3	−10.4
Liberal hold		Swing	-5.5	

All parties could therefore take some comfort from the result. The Liberals had held the seat with an outside candidate at a time when the country was at war and with their traditional constituencies among the working class and the Irish being targeted by labour. The Conservatives, with a strong local candidate, had reduced the Liberal majority and secured more votes than they had ever previously done in Dewsbury. The SDF had improved on the only previous labour candidacy in the seat at a time when the socialist political parties were disunited in the town and in spite of their candidate's radical opinions. Over the next few years the by-election record of the Conservative government would worsen considerably but for now and until the end of the Boer War was in sight, support for the government appeared to be holding.

== Aftermath ==
General election 1906: Dewsbury Electorate
Party	Candidate	Votes	%	±%
Liberal	Walter Runciman	6,764	54.8	+6.7
Conservative	W. B. Boyd-Carpenter	2,954	24.0	−14.3
Labour Repr. Cmte.	Ben Turner	2,629	21.2	+7.6
Majority		3,810	30.8	+21.0
Turnout		12,347	89.0	+1.7
Liberal hold		Swing	+10.4	
