= Walter Plummer =

Sir Walter Plummer MP JP
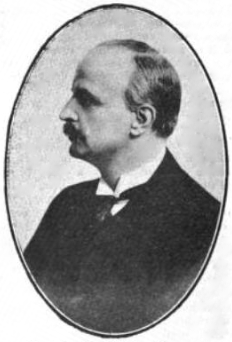

Member of Parliament
- In office 1900–1906
- Constituency: Newcastle-upon-Tyne

Personal details
- Born: 8 November 1858 Newcastle upon Tyne, England
- Died: 10 December 1917 (aged 59) Newcastle upon Tyne, England
- Party: Conservative
- Parent: Benjamin Plummer (father)
- Occupation: Businessman, politician

Sir Walter Richard Plummer (8 November 1858 – 10 December 1917) JP MP was a British politician, merchant, alderman, and businessman who was Conservative MP for Newcastle-upon-Tyne, a two-member constituency at the time.

Plummer was son of Alderman Benjamin Plummer.

He won the seat with another Conservative in 1900, but they lost it to Liberal and Labour candidates in 1906. He was knighted in 1904.

He died in Newcastle on 10 December 1917.

== Sources ==
- The Liberal Year Book, 1907
- Craig, FWS, ed. (1974). British Parliamentary Election Results: 1885–1918. London: Macmillan Press. ISBN 9781349022984
- Debrett's House of Commons & Judicial Bench, 1901
- Whitaker's Almanack, 1901 to 1907 editions
- Leigh Rayment's Historical List of MPs
