= Saville Ogle =

British politician

Member of Parliament for South Northumberland
- In office 5 July 1841 – 19 July 1852 Serving with Matthew Bell
- Preceded by: Christopher Blackett; Matthew Bell
- Succeeded by: Wentworth Beaumont; Henry Liddell

Personal details
- Born: 4 June 1811 East Knoyle, Wiltshire, England, United Kingdom
- Died: 11 March 1854 (aged 42–43)
- Resting place: Kensal Green Cemetery, Royal Borough of Kensington and Chelsea, Greater London, England
- Party: Whig
- Parent(s): John Saville Ogle and Catherine Hannah Sneyd

Saville Craven Henry Ogle (1811 – 11 March 1854) was a British Whig politician. Ogle was the son of reverend John Saville Ogle and Catherine Hannah Sneyd

== Political career ==
Ogle was elected Whig MP for South Northumberland at the 1841 general election, and held the seat until 1852 when he stood down.

== Marriage ==
On 31 December 1850, he married Mary Anne Wilson.

Parliament of the United Kingdom
Preceded by Christopher Blackett; Matthew Bell	Member of Parliament for South Northumberland; 1841–1847; With: Matthew Bell	Succeeded by Wentworth Beaumont; Henry Liddell
