= Lady Sybil Grey =

British philanthropist (1882-1966)

Lady Sybil Grey OBE
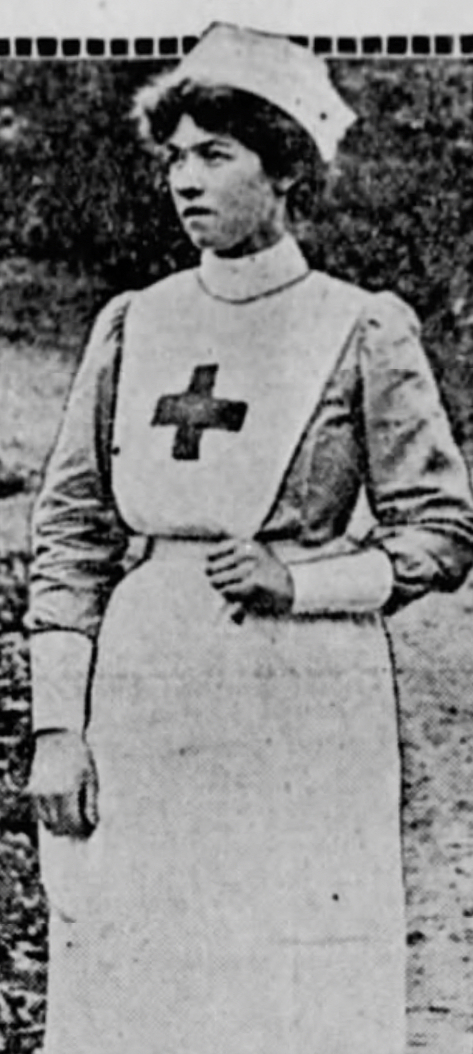
- Grey in 1915
- Born: 15 July 1882; Mayfair, England
- Died: 4 June 1966 (aged 83); Ringwood, Hampshire, England
- Education: Newcastle Royal Infirmary
- Known for: Nursing
- Spouse: Lambert William Middleton (m. 1922; died 1966)
- Children: 2
- Parents: Albert Grey, 4th Earl Grey (father); Alice Holford (mother)

Lady Sybil Middleton OBE (née Grey; 15 July 1882 – 4 June 1966) was a British philanthropist and Voluntary Aid Detachment nurse. She was commandant of the Anglo-Russian Hospital in Saint Petersburg during the First World War.

== Early life ==
Grey was born in Mayfair, the second daughter of Albert Grey, M.P., and his wife, Alice Holford, the second daughter of Robert Stayner Holford. Her great-grandfather was the 2nd Earl Grey, prime minister of the United Kingdom (1830–34), and namesake of the famed tea. In 1894, her father inherited the earldom from his father's older brother, the 3rd Earl.

Lady Sybil was raised in Northumberland. She had a brother, Charles, 5th Earl Grey, and three sisters; Lady Victoria Sybil Mary Grenfell (1878-1907), Lady Evelyn Alice Jones (1886–1971), and Lady Lilian (1891-1895). During her time in England, she competed at rifle ranges and horse racing.

== Canada ==
In 1904, the Greys moved to Ottawa, Ontario, Canada where her father would serve as the Governor General of Canada until 1911.

In 1906, Lady Sybil and 15 Ottawa women cofounded the Ottawa chapter of the Imperial Order Daughters of the Empire (IODE), a patriotic club to support Canadian troops fighting overseas during the War. Another part of her efforts during the First World War was serving as a Voluntary Aid Detachment nurse at a hospital in Northumbria. She transformed her family home in Northumberland into a hospital to look after 400 patients during the war.

== Anglo-Russian Hospital ==
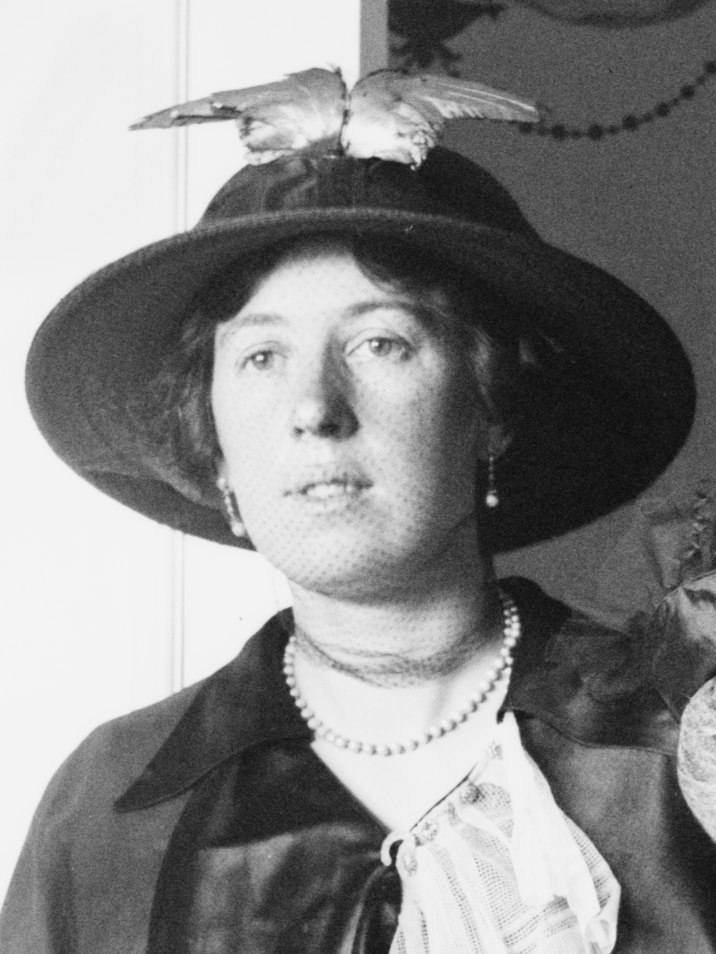
Lady Sybil Grey in 1914

In October 1915, a year into the First World War, Lady Sybil moved to Saint Petersburg to run the Anglo-Russian Hospital, begun by Lady Muriel Paget, daughter of the Earl of Winchilsea. The Imperial Russian government had been begging in vain for military aid from the British, and instead, in a scheme devised by Lady Muriel, a Red Cross hospital was set up as a "grand gesture" at Princess Elizabeth Palace. The hospital was dubbed "The Empire's Gift to Our Russian Allies." The involvement of the two aristocratic women were mocked, with The British Journal of Nursing (BJN) dismissing their efforts due to their lack of experience. In the winter of 1915, ships bringing hospital supplies from Britain were icebound in the Baltic Sea, but the hospital was taking in patients by February 1916 and would go on to treat 8,000 Russian soldiers. The hospital remained open even as the Russian Revolution began in 1917.

The story of how Lady Sybil became Lady Muriel's surprising replacement in Saint Petersburg was recounted by her brother-in-law Sir Lawrence Evelyn Jones many years later:

To take [Lady Muriel's] place as Commandant of the Hospital and diplomatic leader of the team, she persuaded the committee to nominate Lady Sybil Grey, an unmarried young woman of 33 with no professional qualifications, but with a knowledge of people—and of their sensitive spots—that came from seven years spent in Canada as a daughter of Lord Grey, the Governor-General. The medical and nursing journals declared the appointment to be almost scandalously inept. Little did they know. By her coolness, her wisdom, her imperturbable common sense, her charm, her warm human sympathies, and, above all, her unself-regarding devotion to duty, Sybil Grey made an outstanding success of her job...

In March, 1917, for 10 days, Sybil watched, from the palace windows, the crowds, the shootings, the panics and the triumphs; heard the rumours, read the broadsheets, of the Revolution. She kept her head, flew Union Jacks, took in wounded of all parties, persuaded armed Reds to leave her in peace, and met with nothing but politeness.

— L. E. Jones, The Times, 10 June 1966

The two women also established field hospitals on the Eastern Front in Ukraine, in Volhynia, Bukovina and Carpathia. During her stay at a field hospital, Lady Sybil suffered a facial injury as a result of a hand grenade. She returned to England to stay with her dying father and worked at the Dorchester House hospital. She continued her nursing efforts and eventually spent nearly a year in France leading the Women’s Legion.

Lady Sybil was made an Officer of the Order of the British Empire at the 1918 Birthday Honours for her efforts during the war.

== Personal life ==
In 1922, Lady Sybil married Lambert Middleton, son of Henry Nicholas Middleton of Lowood House, Melrose, and Sophia Elizabeth Meredith, daughter of Sir William Collis Meredith. Middleton served as director of the National Bank of Scotland before his death in 1941. They had one son, BBC executive Henry Lambert Middleton, and one daughter, Mary Sybil Boyd.

She died in June 1966 at her home Burley Grange in Ringwood, Hampshire. Her funeral was held at St John the Baptist Church in Burley, Hampshire, followed by a memorial at St Paul's Church in Knightsbridge, London.
