= 1878 South Northumberland by-election =

UK Parliamentary by-election

The 1878 South Northumberland by-election was fought on 17 April 1878. The by-election was fought due to the succession to a peerage of the incumbent Conservative MP, Lord Eslington. It was won by the Conservative candidate Edward Ridley.

1878 South Northumberland by-election
Party	Candidate	Votes	%	±%
Conservative	Edward Ridley	2,909	50.1	N/A
Liberal	Albert Grey	2,903	49.9	N/A
Majority		6	0.2	N/A
Turnout		5,812	78.4	N/A
Registered electors		7,415		
Conservative hold				

- The original count for this by-election had both candidates receiving 2,912 votes.
