= Thomas Wentworth Beaumont =

British politician and soldier (1792-1848)

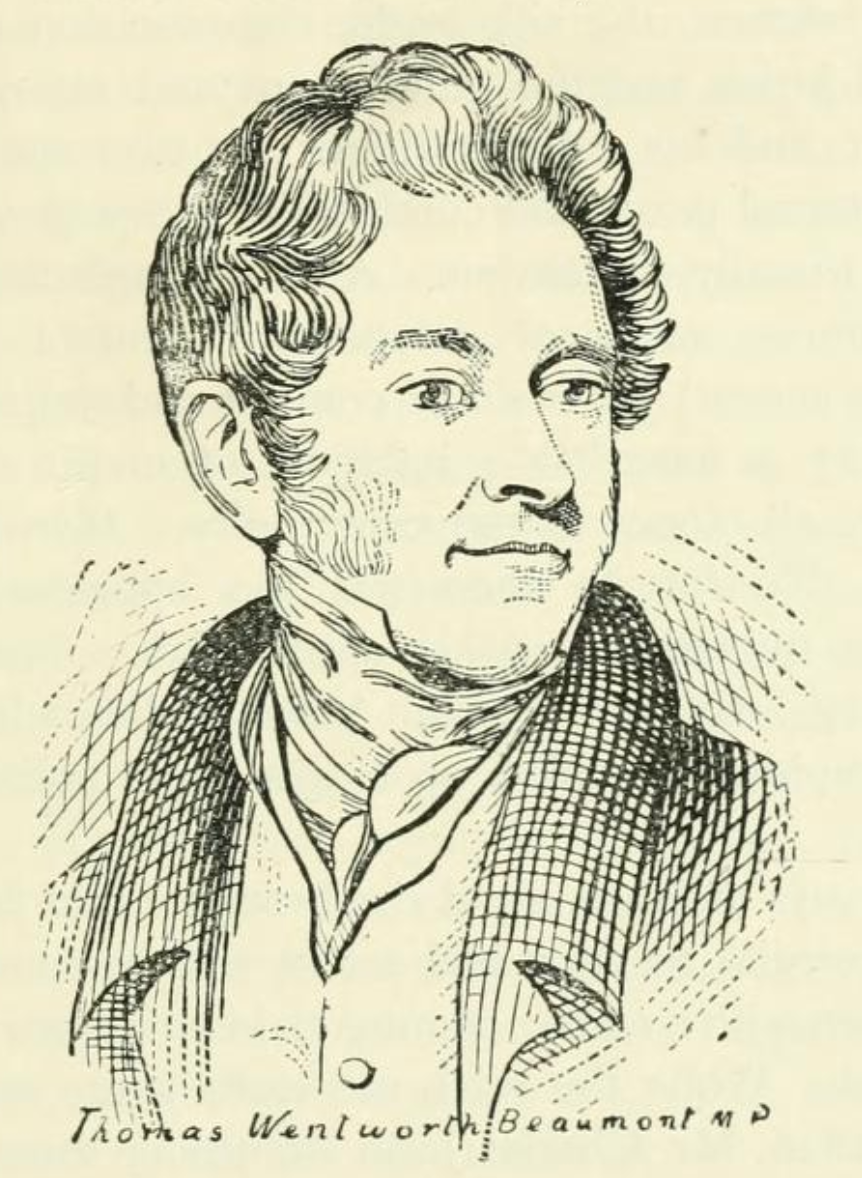
- Thomas Wentworth Beaumont

Member of Parliament for Northumberland
- In office 1818–1826 Serving with Sir Charles Monck (1818-1820); Charles John Brandling (1820-1826)
- Preceded by: Sir Charles Monck; Thomas Richard Beaumont
- Succeeded by: Matthew Bell; Henry Liddell

Member of Parliament for Stafford
- In office 1826–1830 Serving with Ralph Benson
- Preceded by: Richard Ironmonger; Ralph Benson
- Succeeded by: John Campbell; Thomas Gisborne

Member of Parliament for Northumberland
- In office 1830–1832 Serving with Matthew Bell (1830-1831); Henry Grey (1831-1832)
- Preceded by: Matthew Bell; Henry Liddell
- Succeeded by: Constituency abolished

Member of Parliament for South Northumberland
- In office 1832–1837 Serving with Matthew Bell
- Preceded by: Constituency established
- Succeeded by: Matthew Bell; Christopher Blackett

Personal details
- Born: 5 November 1792 Old Burlington Street, Mayfair, London
- Died: 20 December 1848 (aged 56) Bournemouth, Dorset, England
- Resting place: Bretton Hall, West Yorkshire
- Party: Tory
- Spouse: Henrietta Jane Emma Hawks Atkinson (m. 1827)
- Children: 6
- Parents: Thomas Richard Beaumont (father); Diana Wentworth (mother)
- Relatives: Wentworth Beaument (son); Somerset Beaumont (son)
- Education: Eton College
- Alma mater: St John's College, Cambridge
- Military career
- Allegiance: Great Britain
- Branch: British Army
- Rank: Lieutenant-colonel
- Unit: Northumberland Militia

Arms of Beaumont, of Bretton Hall, Yorkshire: Gules, a lion rampant or armed and langued azure an orle of eight crescents of the second

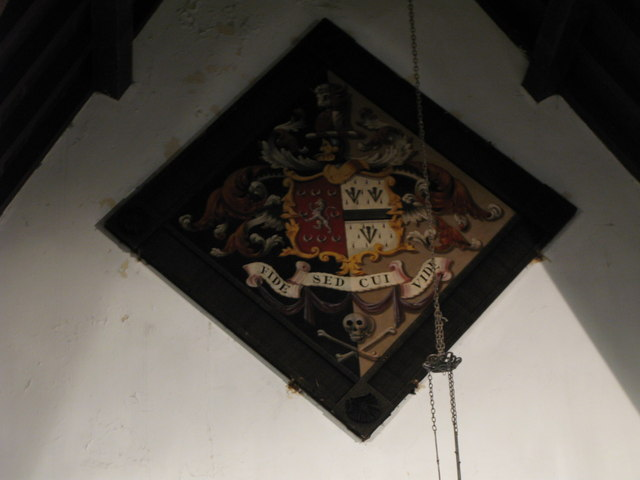
Funeral hatchment in St Andrew's Church, Bywell, Northumberland, of Thomas Wentworth Beaumont, showing the arms of Beaumont impaling Atkinson

Thomas Wentworth Beaumont (5 November 1792 – 20 December 1848) of Bretton Hall, Wakefield in Yorkshire, and of Bywell Hall in Northumberland, was a British politician and soldier. In 1831, at the time he inherited his mother's estate, he was the wealthiest commoner in England.

== Origins ==
Thomas Wentworth B Beaumont was born on 5 November 1792 in Old Burlington Street in Mayfair, London, the eldest son of Thomas Richard Beaumont by his wife Diana Wentworth, daughter of Sir Thomas Wentworth, 5th Baronet. He was educated at Eton College and St John's College, Cambridge, where he graduated with a Bachelor of Arts in 1813.

== Career ==
He served as lieutenant-colonel of the Northumberland Militia, but resigned in 1824. In 1826, he fought a duel with John Lambton later 1st Earl of Durham. He was president of the Literary Association of the Friends of Poland and a member of the Royal Yacht Squadron.

In 1816 Beaumont stood as Member of Parliament (MP) for Northumberland, the same constituency his father had represented before. He lost this seat in 1826, however was successful for Stafford in a by-election in 1826. After the general election of 1830 Beaumont was returned again for Northumberland, until in 1832, the constituency was split into a north and south division. Beaumont was elected for the latter, and sat then for South Northumberland until his retirement from politic in 1837. Initially a Tory, he was considered a Liberal from 1820.

== Marriage and progeny ==
On 22 November 1827 Beaumont married Henrietta Jane Emma Hawks Atkinson, daughter of John Atkinson, by whom he had two daughters and four sons, including:

- Wentworth Beaumont, 1st Baron Allendale, eldest son and heir, raised to the peerage in 1906;
- Somerset Archibald Beaumont, 3rd son, MP for Newcastle-upon-Tyne and Wakefield.

== Death and burial ==
Beaumont died at the age of 56 at Bournemouth and was buried at his seat Bretton Hall, Wakefield, Yorkshire.

Parliament of the United Kingdom
| Preceded by Sir Charles Monck; Thomas Richard Beaumont | Member of Parliament for Northumberland; 1818 – 1826; With: Sir Charles Monck 1818-1820; Charles John Brandling 1820-1826 | Succeeded by Matthew Bell; Hon. Henry Liddell |
| Preceded by Richard Ironmonger; Ralph Benson | Member of Parliament for Stafford; 1826 – 1830; With: Ralph Benson | Succeeded by John Campbell; Thomas Gisborne |
| Preceded by Matthew Bell; Hon. Henry Liddell | Member of Parliament for Northumberland; 1830 – 1832; With: Matthew Bell 1830–1831; Viscount Howick 1831–1832 | Constituency abolished |
| New constituency | Member of Parliament for South Northumberland; 1832 – 1837; With: Matthew Bell | Succeeded by Matthew Bell; Christopher Blackett |
