= Anglo-Russian Hospital =

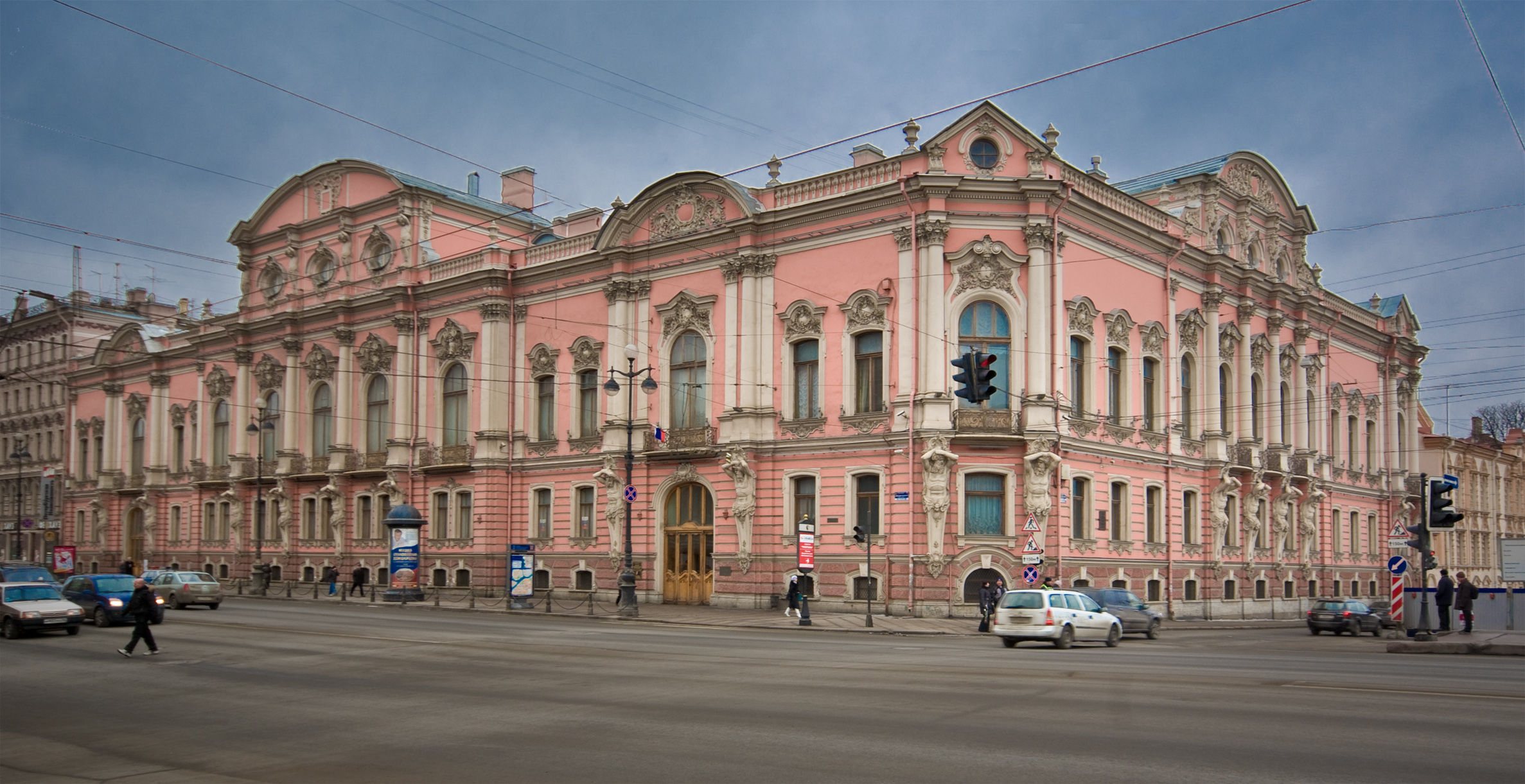
- Dmitri Palace
- Interactive map of the Anglo-Russian Hospital area

General information
- Coordinates: 59.9327°N 30.3446°E

The Anglo-Russian Hospital was a hospital in Petrograd set up during the First World War. It was called 'The (British) Empire's Gift to Our Russian Allies' and was founded in 1915 and was closed in 1918.

Lady Muriel Paget and Lady Sybil Grey helped raise the funds to keep the hospital, located in what is now the Beloselsky-Belozersky Palace, running and set up several field hospitals along the Eastern Front. Pioneering neurosurgeon Geoffrey Jefferson served here for about 18 months between 1916 and 1918. The hospital was visited by Tsarina Alexandra and her daughters, and Prince Felix Yusupov is reported to have had to have a fish bone removed from his throat here a few hours after the murder of Rasputin. The hospital closed not long after the October Revolution and the staff were evacuated to England.
