= Moses Benson =

Moses Benson (1738 – 5 June 1806) was a British West Indies merchant, who became heavily engaged in the Liverpool slave trade.

== Origins ==
Benson was the son of John Benson (1684–1766), a salt dealer of Mansriggs, near Ulverston, in Furness.

== Career ==
In the 1760s, Benson became a captain in the West India trade for Abraham Rawlinson, a Lancaster merchant, and acted as Rawlinson's agent in Jamaica, before commencing trade in the West Indies on his own account.

Having acquired a significant fortune, Benson returned to Liverpool, where in 1775 he entered the slave trade. Between 1775 and his death in 1806, he can be associated with no fewer than 67 slaving ventures.

He bought a large house in Duke Street in Liverpool, which occupied an entire block between Cornwallis Street, Kent Street and St. James's Street.

In 1797, Benson was appointed to the committee charged with conducting the arrangements for the defence of Liverpool.

In 1802 he built and endowed St. James's School, in St. James's Road, for poor children. By 1835, the school was educating nearly 200 boys and about 100 girls.

Benson died on 5 June 1806. In 1807, the trustees of his estate bought an estate at Lutwyche, in Shropshire, which then passed to his heirs. Alternatively, according to historian Jane Longmore, Benson bought the Lutwyche estate himself in the 1780s.

Benson's Estate Act 1830
- Act of Parliament
- Parliament of the United Kingdom
- Long title: An Act for vesting an Estate at Liverpool, in the County of Lancaster, devised and settled by the Will of Moses Benson, Esquire, deceased, in Trustees, to be sold, and for laying out the Monies arising from such sale in the purchase of Estates to be settled to the same uses.
- Citation: 11 Geo. 4 & 1 Will. 4. c. 40 Pr.

Dates
- Royal assent: 16 July 1830

Benson's will was a controversial document. It identified his four children as his children or “reputed” children and made no mention of their mother (Judith Powell) whom he never married. According to records in Jamaican archives, Judith Powell was a "free mustee", indicating she was of partly black ancestry. Despite the apparent de facto relationship, Judith accompanied Moses and their children on his return Liverpool and remained there until her death. A bequest of £15,000 to his daughter Mary was revoked in the event that she married a native of Ireland. The complications of administering his estate were such as to lead to a private act of Parliament, Benson's Estate Act 1830 (11 Geo. 4 & 1 Will. 4. c. 40 Pr.) some 24 years after his death, in 1830.

== Family ==
Benson had four children who survived him:

- Ralph Benson (July 1772-October 1845), who married Barbara, the daughter of Thomas Lewin, and was MP for Stafford
- Moses Benson (1780–1837), who married Margaret Kendall, the daughter of Capt. John Kendall of Liverpool & the 'Molly', a slave vessel, and Margaret Ward
- Mary Benson (b.1777), who married the Rev. Charles Gladwin
- Jane-Dorothea Benson (b.1780), who married Richard Elmshirst of West Ashby, Lincolnshire
