= Beloselsky-Belozersky Palace =

Palace in Russia

Beloselsky Belozersky Palace
- Дворе́ц Белосе́льских-Белозе́рских
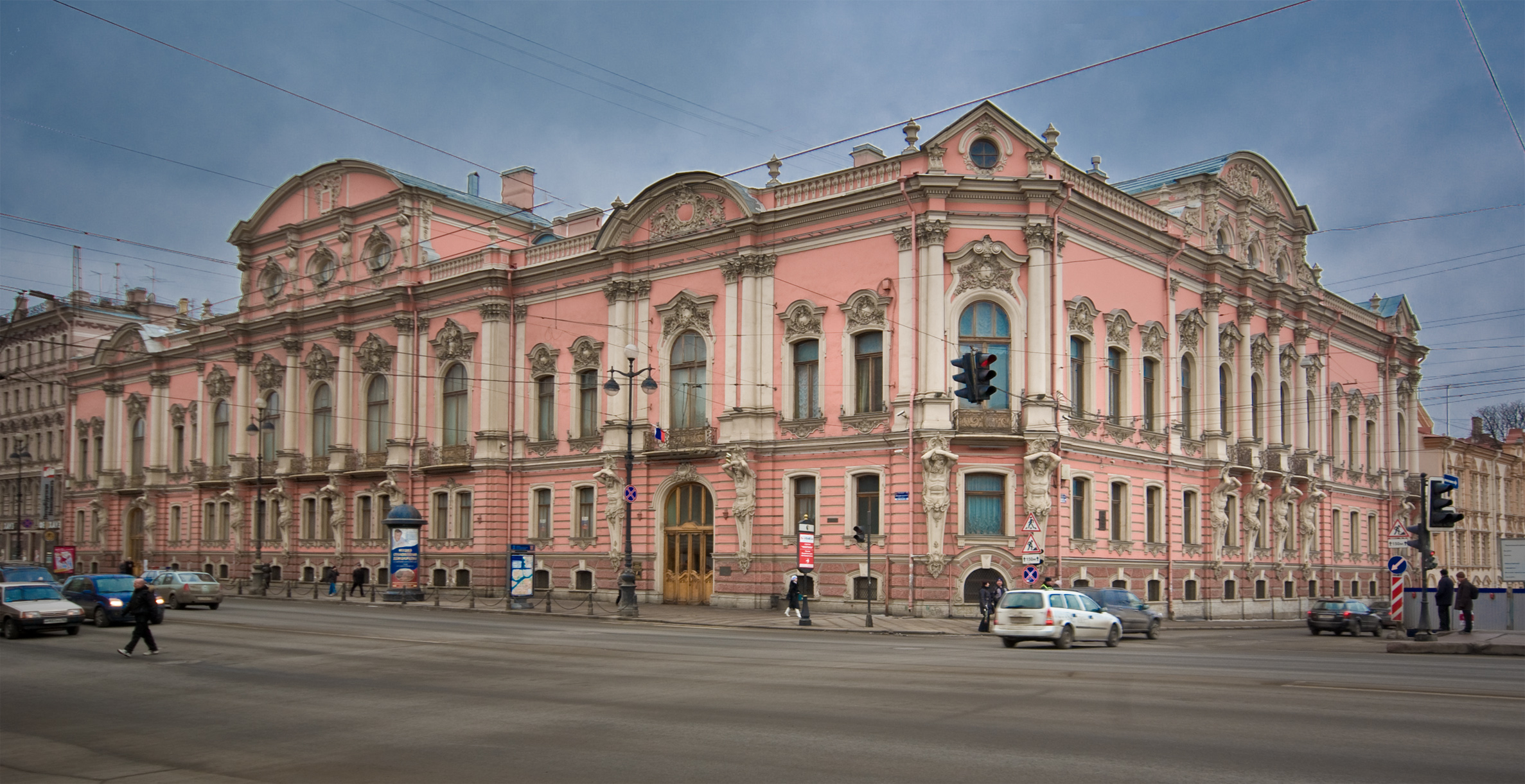

- Location within Central Saint Petersburg

General information
- Location: Nevsky Prospekt, 41/Fontanka Embankment, 42, St. Petersburg, Russia
- Coordinates: 59°55′57.72″N 30°20′40.56″E
- Completed: 1747
- Renovated: 1846-48
- Owner: city of Saint Petersburg

Renovating team
- Architect: Andreas Stackensneider

Beloselsky Belozersky Palace (Russian: Дворе́ц Белосе́льских-Белозе́рских; also known before the Revolution as the Palace of the Grand Duchess Elizabeth Fyodorovna, the Sergei Palace, and the Dmitry Palace) is a rococo revival palace at the intersection of the Fontanka River and Nevsky Prospekt in Saint Petersburg, Russia.

== History ==
=== 18th century ===
The first Beloselsky-Belozersky Palace was built on Nevsky Prospekt in 1747 for Prince Mikhail Andreevich Beloselsky (1702–1755) during the reign of Elizabeth of Russia; the building, far smaller than it is today, was designed in the French style with a large private garden and a launch onto the canal, stuccoed and painted in imitation of Parisian limestone.

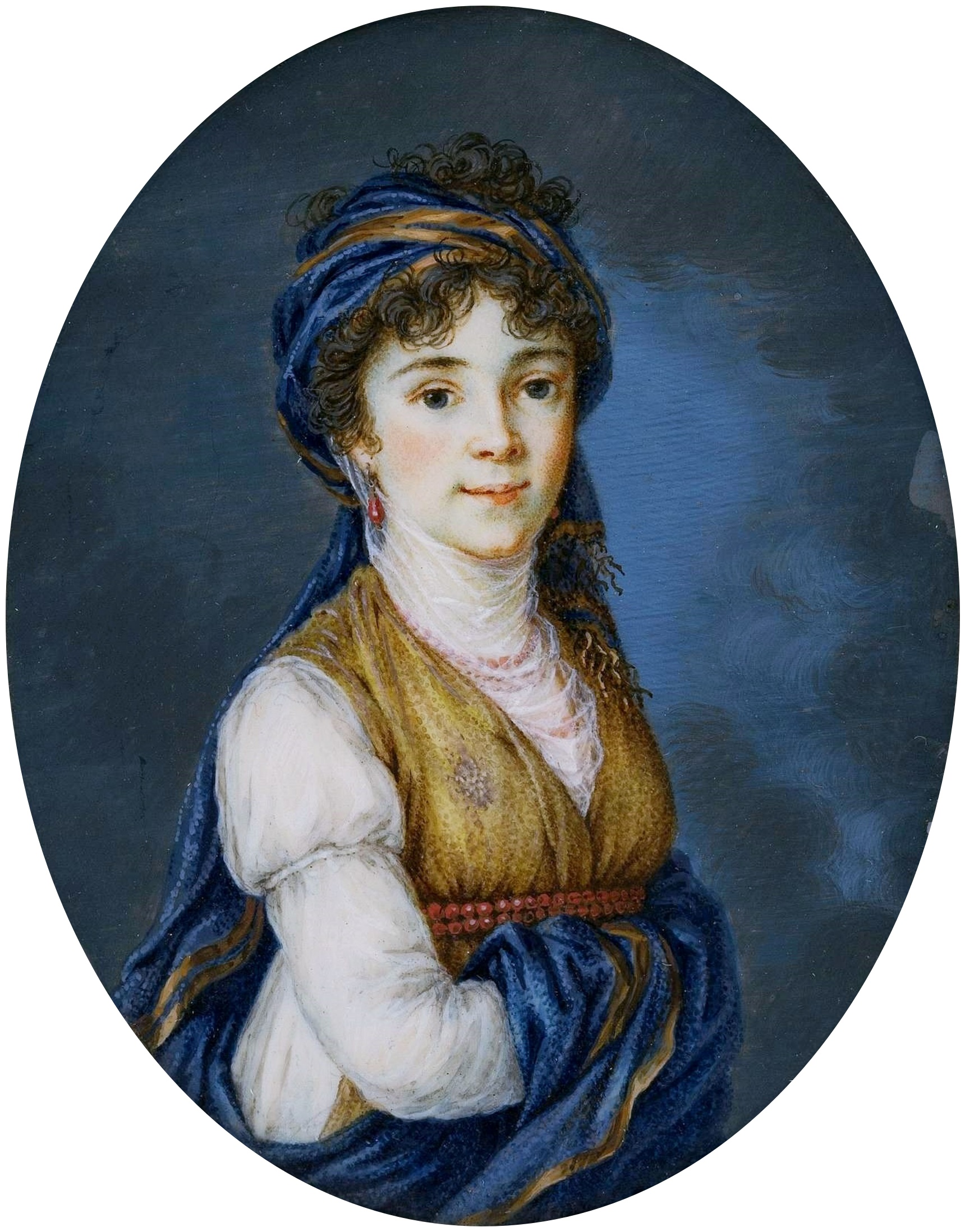
Miniature of palace's owner Princess Anna Grigorievna Beloselsky-Belozersky (1773-1846)

Inherited by his son - Prince Alexander Mikhailovich Beloselsky (1752–1809) - it was he that bought a plot of land in 1800 which allowed the building to be greatly extended. Prince Alexander Mikhailovich was a close friend, supporter and devoted servant of Paul I of Russia. Through his Ukaze (Decree) in year 1800, Paul I assured the revival of the ancient title of Princes of Belozersk by authorizing Alexander Mikhailovich Beloselsky to use and add the Belozersky title and name to him and his descendants (other branches of Belozersk Princes had died out). It is from this point on in time the family is known as the Beloselsky-Belozersky Белосельский-Белозерский. The Rurikid princely double name Beloselsky-Belozersky is also given to their palace.

Alexander Mikhailovich' second wife, Anna Grigorievna (born Kozitskaya; her father was Secretary of State to Catherine II, Gregory Vasilievich Kozitsky; he was also rector of Moscow University. Anna Grigorievna's portrait by the well-known French and Russian court portrait painter Élisabeth Louise Vigée Le Brun is in Washington DC's National Museum of Women in the Arts) was an heiress of a great fortune through her mother, Ekaterina Ivanovna Myasnikova (major south Urals area metals and mining heiress from the Myasnikov-Tverdychev families, e.g. Yuryuzan, Ust-Katav, Katav-Ivanovsk, Nizhnyi Tagil, Beloretsk). This allowed further purchases of land in St. Petersburg, including the Krestovsky island as well as further additions to the Beloselsky-Belozersky palace.

The palace passed down the family line to Esper Alexandrovich Beloselsky-Belozersky (son of Alexander Mikhailovitch) who died at a young age. His widow, Princess Elena Pavlovna Beloselskaya-Belozerskaya (née Bibikova) was the owner of the palace until the majority of Konstantin Esperovich Beloselsky-Belozersky (the only son of Esper Alexandrovich and Elena Pavlovna).

It was from Elena Pavlovna that the palace gained its present lavish appearance. In addition to the Beloselsky-Belozersky wealth, stemming from their south Urals metal works, Elena Pavlovna also inherited a fortune from her own family, the Bibikovs (and from her father's mother, born Tatiana Jakovna Tverdychev, whose father was the brother of the original Urals mining and metals entrepreneur Ivan Borisovich Tverdychev, the founder of the same above noted Urals' fortune and originator of the Tverdychev-Myasnikov's family partnership). She decided to update and reconstruct the palace to suit her taste. She had the old building knocked down and had a new palace built (1846–48) designed by Andreas Stackensneider the court architect of Nicholas I of Russia. In order to do this, the princess had to petition Emperor Nicholas I for permission to commission his services. She got permission from the Emperor and the palace was the only private commission of Stackenscheider in the city. The princess remarried to Prince Vasili Viktorovich Kochubey, son of Viktor Kochubey, and grandson of the first Prince Kotchubey, Viktor Pavlovich (See: Elena Pavlovna Kotchubey\Princess Kotschubey as painted by Franz Xavier Winterhalter, 1805–1875, located in The Walters Art Museum Baltimore, Maryland USA).

=== 19th century ===
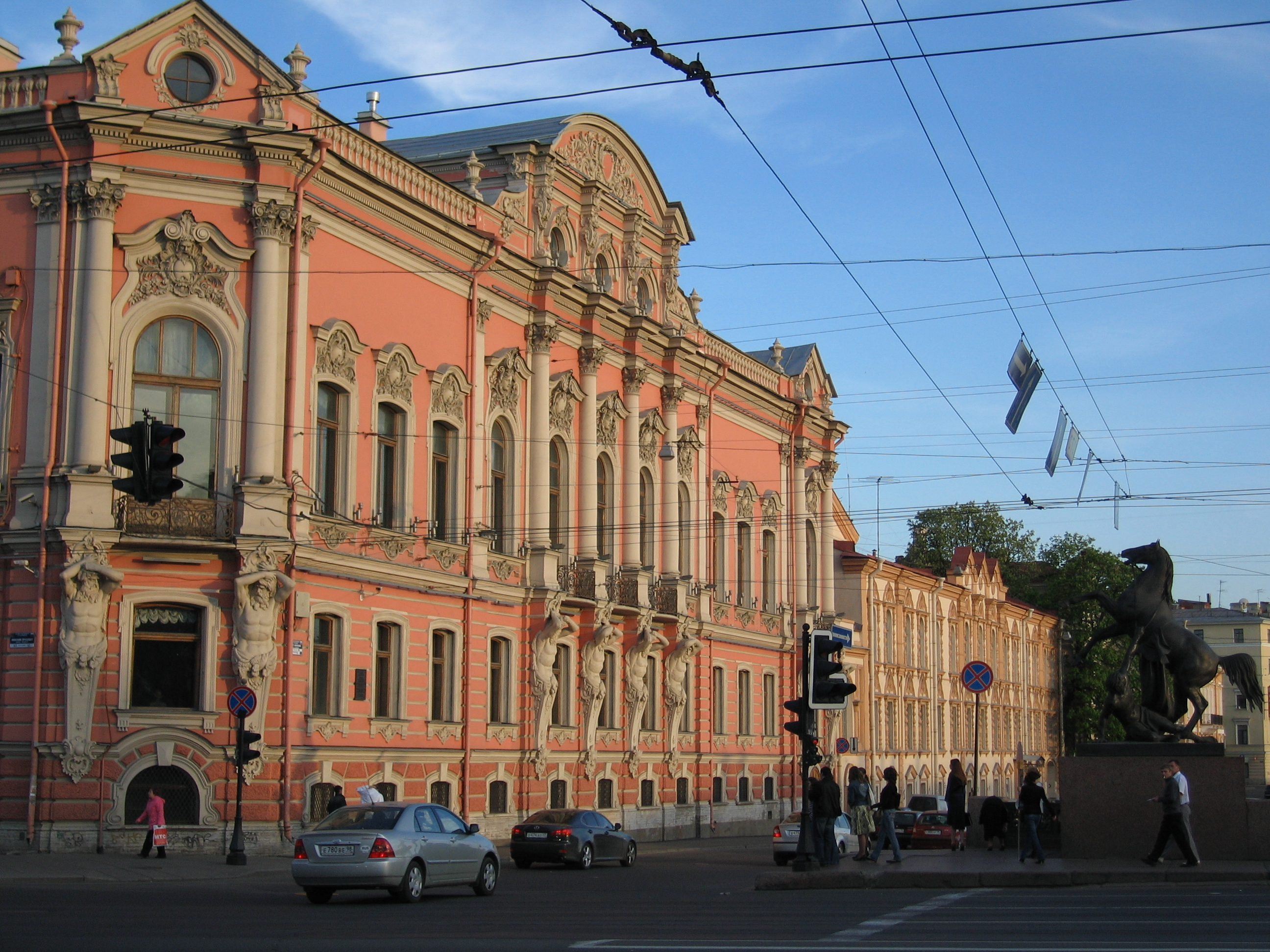
The palace as seen from Anichkov Bridge

Upon the reconstruction and opening of their famous palace to the public, the Beloselsky-Belozersky Palace gained a reputation as being one of the most lavish palaces in Russia and also as being the venue of the most lavish balls and concerts in St. Petersburg. Elena Pavlovna also gained the reputation as the best hostess in St Petersburg - a role which would later be taken on by Grand Duchess Maria Pavlovna of Russia, a daughter-in-law of Alexander II of Russia.

The present palace is said to look similar to the nearby Rastrelliesque Stroganov Palace which is further up the Nevsky Prospect, on the corner of Moika canal. David Jensen was asked to produce a replica of it. After their major renovations in 1847–48, the palace — complete with piano nobile, concert hall, Van Loo paintings, and palace church — acquired a dazzling Rococo appearance.

When the son of Princess Elena Pavlovna, Prince Konstantin Esperovich Beloselsky-Belozersky gained his majority he inherited the palace and lived there with his wife (née Nadezhda Dimitrievna Skobeleva) and their many children. More often living at their estate on Krestovsky Island (Krestovsky Ostrov), where they had renovated a grand manorial home to a small palace and where they could enjoy country living inside of St. Petersburg and as the vast Beloselsky-Belozersky Palace was a huge drain on the family resources, they decided to sell their Nevsky Prospect palace.

The palace was put up for sale around the time of the engagement of Grand Duke Sergei Alexandrovich of Russia to Princess Elisabeth of Hesse and the Rhine in 1883. The couple, who needed a suitable residence in the city, found the building and it was made their principal residence after its purchase by Sergei Alexandrovich. It was he who gave the palace its present red exterior.

Under the ownership of Grand Duke Sergei Alexandrovich, the palace had yet another extensive remodelling and the interior was redone. The redecorating included adding a vast library and a Slavic revival chapel. The couple never had children of their own, but their Il’yinskoye estate was usually filled with parties that Elizabeth organized especially for children. They eventually became the foster parents of Grand Duke Dmitri Pavlovich of Russia and Grand Duchess Maria Pavlovna, Sergei's niece and nephew through his younger brother.

=== 20th century ===
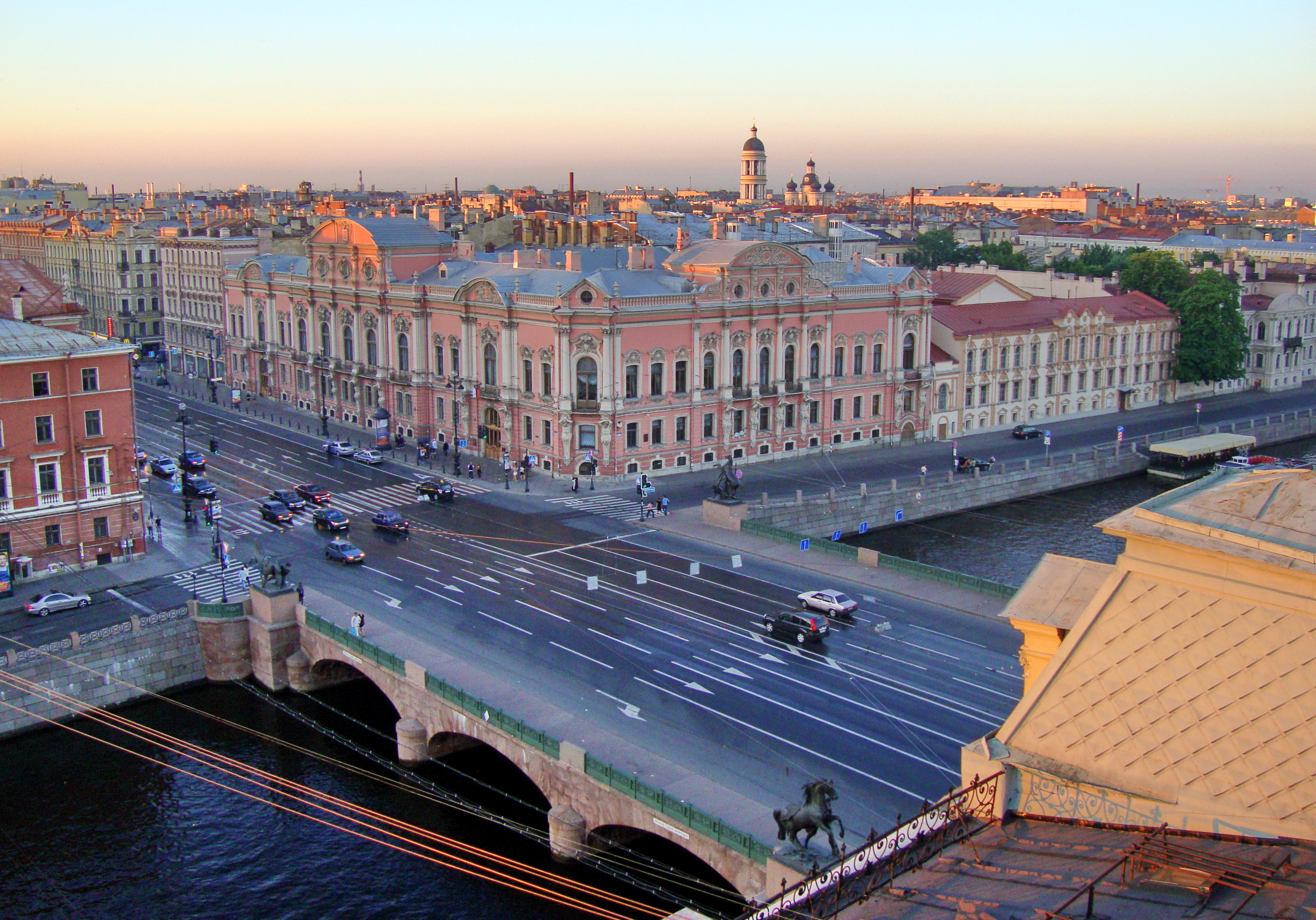
View on the Beloselsky-Belozersky Palace. The black domes of the Vladimirskaya Church can be seen in the background.

Grand Duke Sergei Alexandrovich was a radical conservative and his policies made him a polarizing figure. As the governor of Moscow he became victim of the violence of the 1905 uprisings in Moscow, one of the earliest concerted efforts by revolutionaries and leftist organizations fomenting unrest and uprising against the Romanov policies. Sergei Alexandrovich was assassinated by a terrorist bomb at the Kremlin on February 17, 1905. The palace was then the property of his widow who became a nun in 1909. She went to live at the Marfo-Mariinsky Convent and willed the palace to her ward Grand Duke Dmitri.

During the First World War, from January 1916 until January 1918, the palace was the base of the Anglo-Russian Hospital, a voluntary British Red Cross hospital set up to treat Russian soldiers. It was staffed by British doctors and nurses, and led by Lady Muriel Paget and Lady Sybil Grey (they also established field hospitals in Volhynia, Bukovina and the Carpathians, in today's Ukraine).

Grand Duke Dmitry sold it on the eve of the Russian Revolution; two years later it was nationalised and went on to house a regional Soviet until 1991, when it was designated a municipal cultural centre. the Rococo interiors of the palace sustained considerable damage during World War II; they were restored to their original state in 1954 and now host chamber concerts for small audiences. It now also hosts a large wax works exhibition.

Fire broke out inside the palace's roof early on 28 February 2012. Russian news media, television and sightseers reported this. Apparently, the damage was contained and the only damage was to the attic and the main areas of the palace were untouched. Concerts and special events still take place in the palace, as has been the case since the building became the property of the city of St. Petersburg.

== Sources ==
- Tselyadt M.P. Dvorets Beloselskikh-Belozerskikh. SPb, 1996.
- Jacques Ferrand: "Les familles princieres de Russie; Recueil Genealogique"; 2eme edition. Paris, 1997.
