= Wentworth Beaumont, 1st Baron Allendale =

British industrialist and Liberal politician

Arms of Beaumont, Baron Allendale: Gules, a lion rampant or armed and langued azure an orle of eight crescents of the second

Wentworth Blackett Beaumont, 1st Baron Allendale (11 April 1829 – 13 February 1907), was a British industrialist and Liberal politician.

== Background and education ==
Allendale was the eldest son of Thomas Beaumont and his wife Henrietta Jane Emma, daughter of John Atkinson, and was educated at Harrow and St John's College, Cambridge.

== Business and political career ==
Allendale was the owner of major estates and mines in Northumberland and also sat as Member of Parliament for Northumberland South from 1852 to 1885 and for Tyneside from 1886 to 1892. In 1906 he was raised to the peerage as Baron Allendale, of Allendale and Hexham in the County of Northumberland.

== Family ==
Lord Allendale married firstly Lady Margaret Anne, daughter of Ulick de Burgh, 1st Marquess of Clanricarde, and his wife the Honourable Harriet, daughter of George Canning, in 1856. They had three sons and three daughters. Their youngest son the Honourable Hubert Beaumont was Liberal Member of Parliament for Eastbourne. After his first wife's death in 1888 Allendale married secondly Edith Althea, daughter of Lieutenant-General Henry Meade-Hamilton and widow of Major-General Sir George Pomeroy-Colley, in 1891. There were no children from this marriage. Lord Allendale died in February 1907, aged 77, and was succeeded in the barony by his eldest son Wentworth, who also became a Liberal politician and was created Viscount Allendale in 1911. Lady Allendale died in May 1927.

Parliament of the United Kingdom
Preceded by Matthew Bell; Saville Ogle	Member of Parliament for Northumberland South; 1852–1885; With: Henry Liddell 1852–1878; Edward Ridley 1878–1880; Albert Grey 1880–1885	Constituency abolished
Preceded by Albert Grey	Member of Parliament for Tyneside; 1886–1892	Succeeded by Jack Pease
Peerage of the United Kingdom
New creation	Baron Allendale; 1906–1907	Succeeded by Wentworth Beaumont
