= Edward Ridley =

The Right Honourable Sir Edward Ridley
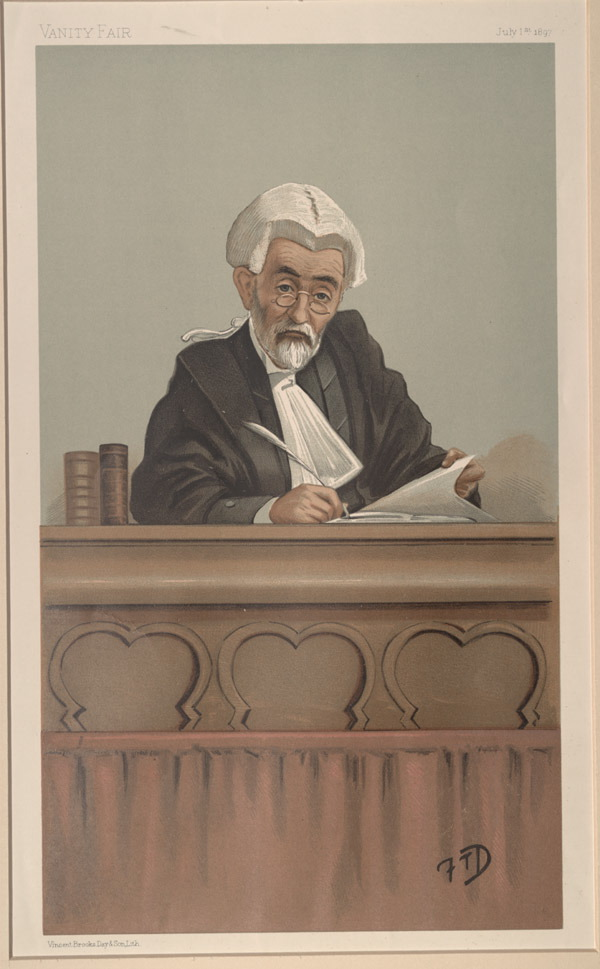

Justice of the High Court
- In office 21 April 1897 – 6 October 1917

Sir Edward Ridley, PC (20 August 1843 – 14 October 1928) was an English barrister, Conservative politician, and judge. Well regarded as an Official Referee, his selection by Lord Chancellor Halsbury for the High Court bench provoked much controversy and allegations of nepotism, as did his subsequent time on the bench.

According to a modern assessment, although Ridley was "one of Halsbury's worst appointments", "it was not unreasonable to widen the field of choice [of judicial appointments] by taking Edward Ridley from among the Official Referees", even though he "turned out far worse than anyone might have expected".

== Background and political career ==
He was born in Stannington, Northumberland, the younger son of Sir Matthew White Ridley, 4th Baronet, and his wife, the Honourable Cecilia Ann Ridley, née Parke, eldest daughter of Sir James Parke, afterwards Baron Wensleydale. His eldest brother Matthew succeeded to the baronetcy and was created a viscount in 1900 after serving as Home Secretary.

Ridley was educated at Harrow and Corpus Christi College, Oxford. He was a fellow of All Souls College, Oxford, 1866–1882.

He was Member of Parliament for South Northumberland from 1878 to 1880.

== Legal career ==
Ridley was called to the bar in 1868 and took silk in 1892. From 1886 to 1897, he was an Official Referee. In 1897, Ridley was appointed a Justice of the High Court and assigned to the Queen's Bench Division, receiving the customary knighthood.

Ridley had been nominated by Lord Halsbury, who had a reputation for appointing unqualified lawyers to the bench on party political grounds. The appointment "aroused an exceptional storm of public and private criticism" and "was greeted with horror". The Law Journal said that "[t]he appointment can be defended on no ground whatsoever. It would be easy to name fifty members of the Bar with a better claim." The Solicitors' Journal described it as "a grave mistake" The Law Times wrote that:

Unquestionable as are the virtues of Mr. Edward Ridley, Q.C.—for some years the favourite Official referee—no-one will believe that he would have been appointed to the High Court Bench but for his connections... Such an innovation, we repeat, was only possible where the hard-working official, the bearer of so many heavy burdens of the High Court judges, was highly connected. This is Ridleyism. Let it be known hereafter as Ridleyism. It is a curiosity."

He resigned from the bench in 1917 and was sworn of the Privy Council.

== Classical scholarship ==
Ridley established his reputation as a classical scholar with a blank verse translation of Lucan's Pharsalia, first published in 1896 and republished in a revised version in 1919.

== Assessments ==
On Ridley's death, Sir Frederick Pollock had written: "Sir E. Ridley, good scholar, Fellow of All Souls, successful, sicut dicunt [so they say], as an Official Referee, and by general opinion of the Bar the worst High Court judge of our time, ill-tempered and grossly unfair: which is rather a mystery".

Lord Justice MacKinnon called Ridley "the worst judge I have appeared before", saying that "he had a perverse instinct for unfairness".

== Personal life ==
Ridley married Alice Davenport, daughter of William Bromley-Davenport of Cheshire. They had two sons, Edward Davenport Ridley MC (1883–1934) and Cecil Guy Ridley CBE (1885–1947).

Parliament of the United Kingdom
Preceded by Hon. Henry Liddell; Wentworth Beaumont	Member of Parliament for South Northumberland; 1878 – 1880; With: Wentworth Beaumont	Succeeded by Albert Grey; Wentworth Beaumont
