= South Northumberland =

Parliamentary constituency in the United Kingdom, 1832–1885

- Former county constituency for the House of Commons
- Form 1832-1868 and this area was left intact until 1885. Extract from 1837 result: the broadest, northern striped area which has an east coast.

1832–1885
- Seats: two
- Created from: Northumberland
- Replaced by: Hexham, Tyneside and Wansbeck

South Northumberland (formally the "Southern Division of Northumberland") was a county constituency of the House of Commons of the Parliament of the United Kingdom. It was represented by two Members of Parliament (MPs), elected by the bloc vote system.

The area was created by the Great Reform Act 1832 by the splitting of Northumberland constituency into Northern and Southern divisions.

It was abolished by the Redistribution of Seats Act 1885, when Northumberland was divided into four single member divisions: Berwick-upon-Tweed, Hexham, Tyneside and Wansbeck.

== Boundaries ==
1832–1886: The Wards of Tynedale and Castle, and the Town and County of the Town of Newcastle upon Tyne.

== Members of Parliament ==
- Constituency created (1832)

Election	1st Member	1st Party	2nd Member	2nd Party
1832	Thomas Wentworth Beaumont	Whig	Matthew Bell	Tory
1834	Thomas Wentworth Beaumont	Whig	Matthew Bell	Conservative
1837	Christopher Blackett	Whig	Matthew Bell	Conservative
1841	Saville Ogle	Whig	Matthew Bell	Conservative
1852	Wentworth Beaumont	Whig	Hon. Henry Liddell	Conservative
1859	Wentworth Beaumont	Liberal	Hon. Henry Liddell	Conservative
1878	Wentworth Beaumont	Liberal	Edward Ridley	Conservative
1880	Wentworth Beaumont	Liberal	Albert Grey	Liberal
1885	Redistribution of Seats Act: constituency abolished			

== Elections ==
=== Elections in the 1830s ===
General election 1832: South Northumberland
Party	Candidate	Votes	%
Whig	Thomas Wentworth Beaumont	2,537	34.6
Tory	Matthew Bell	2,441	33.3
Whig	William Ord	2,351	32.1
Turnout		4,606	88.7
Registered electors		5,192	
Majority		96	1.3
Whig win (new seat)			
Majority		90	1.2
Tory win (new seat)			

General election 1835: South Northumberland
Party	Candidate	Votes	%
Whig	Thomas Wentworth Beaumont	Unopposed	
Conservative	Matthew Bell	Unopposed	
Registered electors		5,042	
Whig hold			
Conservative hold			

General election 1837: South Northumberland
Party	Candidate	Votes	%
Whig	Christopher Blackett	Unopposed	
Conservative	Matthew Bell	Unopposed	
Registered electors		5,070	
Whig hold			
Conservative hold			

=== Elections in the 1840s ===
General election 1841: South Northumberland
Party	Candidate	Votes	%	±%
Whig	Saville Ogle	Unopposed		
Conservative	Matthew Bell	Unopposed		
Registered electors		5,295		
Whig hold				
Conservative hold				

General election 1847: South Northumberland
Party	Candidate	Votes	%	±%
Whig	Saville Ogle	Unopposed		
Conservative	Matthew Bell	Unopposed		
Registered electors		5,369		
Whig hold				
Conservative hold				

=== Elections in the 1850s ===
General election 1852: South Northumberland
Party	Candidate	Votes	%	±%
Whig	Wentworth Beaumont	2,306	35.6	N/A
Conservative	Henry Liddell	2,132	32.9	N/A
Whig	George Ridley	2,033	31.4	N/A
Turnout		4,302 (est)	80.1 (est)	N/A
Registered electors		5,511		
Majority		174	2.7	N/A
Whig hold		Swing	N/A	
Majority		99	1.5	N/A
Conservative hold		Swing	N/A	

General election 1857: South Northumberland
Party	Candidate	Votes	%	±%
Whig	Wentworth Beaumont	Unopposed		
Conservative	Henry Liddell	Unopposed		
Registered electors		5,608		
Whig hold				
Conservative hold				

General election 1859: South Northumberland
Party	Candidate	Votes	%	±%
Liberal	Wentworth Beaumont	Unopposed		
Conservative	Henry Liddell	Unopposed		
Registered electors		5,522		
Liberal hold				
Conservative hold				

=== Elections in the 1860s ===
General election 1865: South Northumberland
Party	Candidate	Votes	%	±%
Liberal	Wentworth Beaumont	Unopposed		
Conservative	Henry Liddell	Unopposed		
Registered electors		5,511		
Liberal hold				
Conservative hold				

General election 1868: South Northumberland
Party	Candidate	Votes	%	±%
Liberal	Wentworth Beaumont	Unopposed		
Conservative	Henry Liddell	Unopposed		
Registered electors		6,862		
Liberal hold				
Conservative hold				

=== Elections in the 1870s ===
General election 1874: South Northumberland
Party	Candidate	Votes	%	±%
Liberal	Wentworth Beaumont	Unopposed		
Conservative	Henry Liddell	Unopposed		
Registered electors		6,698		
Liberal hold				
Conservative hold				

Liddell was elevated to the peerage, becoming Earl of Ravensworth.

1878 South Northumberland by-election
Party	Candidate	Votes	%	±%
Conservative	Edward Ridley	2,909	50.1	N/A
Liberal	Albert Grey	2,903	49.9	N/A
Majority		6	0.2	N/A
Turnout		5,812	78.4	N/A
Registered electors		7,415		
Conservative hold				

- The original count for this by-election had both candidates receiving 2,912 votes.

=== Elections in the 1880s ===
General election 1880: South Northumberland
Party	Candidate	Votes	%	±%
Liberal	Albert Grey	3,896	34.7	N/A
Liberal	Wentworth Beaumont	3,694	32.9	N/A
Conservative	Edward Ridley	3,622	32.2	N/A
Majority		72	0.7	N/A
Turnout		7,417 (est)	84.3 (est)	N/A
Registered electors		8,800		
Liberal gain from Conservative		Swing	N/A	
Liberal hold		Swing	N/A	

== See also ==
- History of parliamentary constituencies and boundaries in Northumberland

== Sources ==
- Leigh Rayment's Historical List of MPs – Constituencies beginning with "N" (part 3)
