= Ralph Benson (politician) =

British politician (1773–1845)

Member of Parliament for Stafford
- In office 7 October 1812 – 19 June 1818
- In office 10 June 1826 – 9 August 1830

Personal details
- Born: 1773 Jamaica
- Died: 23 October 1845 (aged 71–72)
- Party: Tory
- Parent: Moses Benson (father)

Ralph Benson (1773 – 23 October 1845) was a British politician.

== Biography ==
Benson was one the first mixed-race Members of Parliament of the Parliament of Great Britain. His father Moses Benson was a British West Indies merchant who was involved in the Liverpool slave trade. His mother Judith Powell was a freed slave. She was classified as mulatto and was the mother of Moses Bensons four children. He sat for the constituency of Stafford.

== See also ==
- List of ethnic minority politicians in the United Kingdom
- List of MPs elected in the 1826 United Kingdom general election
- List of MPs elected in the 1812 United Kingdom general election
