= Christopher Blackett (politician) =

British politician (1787–1847)

Christopher Blackett (23 October 1787 – 16 January 1847) was a British politician from Northumberland.

The son of colliery owner Christopher Blackett (1751–1829), his family had lived for centuries at Wylam near Newcastle upon Tyne.

He was a Member of Parliament (MP) for the rotten borough of Bere Alston from 1830 to 1831, and for South Northumberland, 1837–1841.

His eldest son John (1821–1856) was also an MP. His second son Montagu was president of the Oxford Union in 1848 as a student of Christ Church, Oxford.

Parliament of the United Kingdom
Preceded by Percy Ashburnham; George, Lord Lovaine	Member of Parliament for Bere Alston; 1830 – 1831; With: George, Lord Lovaine to January 1831; David Lyon from January 1831	Succeeded by Algernon, Lord Lovaine; David Lyon
Preceded by Matthew Bell; Thomas Wentworth Beaumont	Member of Parliament for South Northumberland; 1837 – 1841; With: Matthew Bell	Succeeded by Saville Craven Henry Ogle; Matthew Bell
