= Henry Liddell, 2nd Earl of Ravensworth =

British politician

Henry Liddell
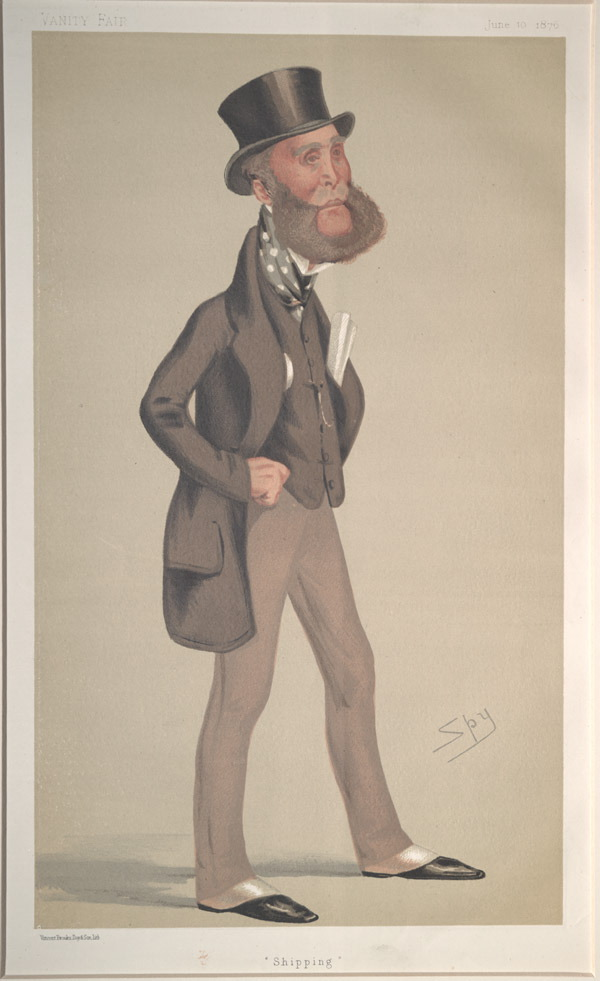
- Caricature by Spy published in Vanity Fair in 1876.

Member of Parliament for Northumberland South
- In office 1852-1878 Serving with Wentworth Beaumont

Personal details
- Born: 8 October 1821
- Died: 22 July 1903 (aged 81)
- Party: Conservative
- Spouse(s): Mary Gunning-Sutton (m. 1852; died 1890) Emma Denman (m. 1892)
- Children: 2
- Parent: Henry Liddell (father)
- Relatives: Thomas Liddell (grandfather)

Henry George Liddell, 2nd Earl of Ravensworth (8 October 1821 – 22 July 1903), styled Lord Eslington between 1874 and 1878, was a British Conservative politician.

== Background ==
Ravensworth was the son of Henry Liddell, 1st Earl of Ravensworth, and Isabella Horatia, daughter of Lord George Seymour.

== Political career ==
Ravensworth sat in the House of Commons as one of two representatives for Northumberland South between 1852 and 1878. The latter year he succeeded his father in the earldom and entered the House of Lords.

== Family ==
Lord Ravensworth married firstly Mary Diana, daughter of Orlando George Gunning-Sutton, on 8 December 1852 at Coolhurst, Sussex. They had two daughters. After her death in 1890, he married secondly Emma Sophia Georgiana, daughter of the Hon. Richard Denman and widow of Oswin Baker-Cresswell, in 1892. There were no children from this marriage. Lord Ravensworth died in July 1903, aged 81, and was succeeded in his titles by his younger brother, Atholl. Lady Ravensworth later remarried and died in January 1939.

== Arms ==
Coat of arms of Henry Liddell, 2nd Earl of Ravensworth
Coronet That of a baron. Crest A lion rampant sable, billetée and crowned with an eastern crown or. Escutcheon Argent, fretty gules, on a chief gules three leopards' faces or. Supporters Two leopards or, semée of golps, and gorged with mural crowns purpure. Motto Fama semper vivit (Fame lives always), and unus et idem (One and the same).

Parliament of the United Kingdom
Preceded by Matthew Bell; Saville Craven Henry Ogle	Member of Parliament for Northumberland South; 1852–1878; With: Wentworth Beaumont	Succeeded by Wentworth Beaumont; Edward Ridley
Peerage of the United Kingdom
Preceded by Henry Thomas Liddell	Earl of Ravensworth; 1878–1903	Succeeded by Atholl Charles John Liddell
