= L. E. Jones =

Jones in 1955

Sir Lawrence Evelyn Jones, 5th Baronet, MC, TD, FRSL (6 April 1885 – 6 September 1969), was an English writer, known for his light verse, humorous prose, a trilogy of reminiscences and three collections of short stories.

== Life and career ==
=== 1885–1945 ===
Lawrence Evelyn Jones – known to his friends as "Jonah" and to readers as L. E. Jones – was born in London on 6 April 1885, the second son of Sir Lawrence Jones, 4th Baronet, and his first wife, Evelyn Mary, née Bevan (d 1912). He grew up in Norfolk and was privately educated before going to Eton in 1897, with his elder brother, Willoughby. The latter died in 1898, aged 14. At Eton, Jones became Captain of Boats and President of "Pop". He went on to Balliol College, Oxford in 1904, where he gained a second class degree in 1908, in Greats. After leaving Oxford he initially pursued a career as a barrister, switching in 1912 to more remunerative employment as a merchant banker. In that year he married Lady Evelyn Alice Grey, daughter of the fourth Earl Grey at St George's, Hanover Square. They had five children, all daughters, two of whom died young.

During the First World War Jones joined the Bedfordshire Yeomanry with which he went to France in June 1915. The following year he transferred to the newly formed Machine Gun Squadron and later to the Infantry. He was severely wounded and taken prisoner in 1918. He won the Military Cross, having earlier been awarded the Territorial Decoration, and retired as a major. He returned to merchant banking, from which he retired in 1945. He then turned to authorship.

=== 1945–1969 ===
Jones's first book – written jointly with G. B. Shirlaw, assistant medical officer of Battersea borough council – was a serious work, You and the Peace (1944), addressing the forthcoming problems of the post-war period, and cautioning against excessive vengeance on the Germans. His comedy The Dove and the Carpenter, satirising peace conferences, opened at the Arts Theatre, London in 1946. He published books on religious and ethical topics, in which he addressed serious themes with a light touch, making what one critic called "excellent, wicked and unanswerable fun" of dogma with which he disagreed. In 1952 Jones's father died, aged 98, and as eldest surviving son, Jones inherited the baronetcy.

Jones's literary reputation was not based on his more serious works but on his books of humour, his three volumes of reminiscences and his short stories. In the words of The Times, "He was well read and developed a remarkable facility for epigram, parody and light verse". At the time, The New Statesman ran a weekly competition inviting readers to submit short verses or pieces of prose on a given topic. The initials "L. E. J." frequently appeared in the list of winners. Some of his pieces were published in 1951 under the title À la Carte; the book gained him the congratulations and friendship of Max Beerbohm. Stings and Honey (1953) continued Jones's success in the same field.

Between 1955 and 1958 his trilogy A Victorian Boyhood, Edwardian Youth and Georgian Afternoon was published. The Times found the trilogy "Admirable alike as autobiography and social history". Reviewing the first, Punch said, "These very enjoyable reminiscences add yet further evidence of the extraordinary unconventionality of conventional English upper-class life". Anthony Powell wrote of the last that, although Jones had scored a hit with the first two, the third was even more interesting, and concluded, "Sir Lawrence is one of the Joneses who should definitely be kept up with". In 1961 Jones published The Bishop's Aunt, a collection of twelve short stories, described by Punch as "urbane, witty and inventive". A second collection, Trepidation in Downing Street, was equally well received: "written with elegance and wit and with the surest good taste". His final book was another volume of short stories, Father Lascaut Hits Back (1964).

Jones was a Fellow of the Royal Society of Literature, and was elected to membership of The Literary Society in 1958. He died in London, aged 84, on 6 September 1969.

== Books ==
- You and the Peace (with G. B. Shirlaw), Macmillan, 1944
- The Bishop and the Cobbler, Secker and Warburg, 1948
- Jesus, Discoverer and Genius: A Reintroduction for Modern Youth, Macmillan, 1948
- Beyond Belief, Secker and Warburg, 1949
- À la Carte, Secker and Warburg, 1951
- Stings and Honey, Rupert Hart-Davis, 1953
- A Victorian Boyhood, Macmillan, 1955
- An Edwardian Youth, Macmillan, 1956
- Georgian Afternoon, Rupert Hart-Davis, 1958
- I Forgot to Tell You, Rupert Hart-Davis, 1959
- The Bishop’s Aunt, Rupert Hart-Davis, 1961
- Trepidation in Downing Street, Rupert Hart-Davis, 1962
- Father Lascaut Hits Back, Chapman and Hall, 1964

== Sources ==
- Lyttelton, George; Rupert Hart-Davis (1978). The Lyttelton Hart-Davis Letters, Volume I. London: John Murray. ISBN 978-0-7195-3478-2.
- Lyttelton, George; Rupert Hart-Davis (1981). The Lyttelton Hart-Davis Letters, Volume III. London: John Murray. ISBN 978-0-7195-3770-7.
