= Henry Grey, 3rd Earl Grey =

English statesman and Australian politician (1802–1894)

The Right Honourable The Earl Grey KG GCMG PC
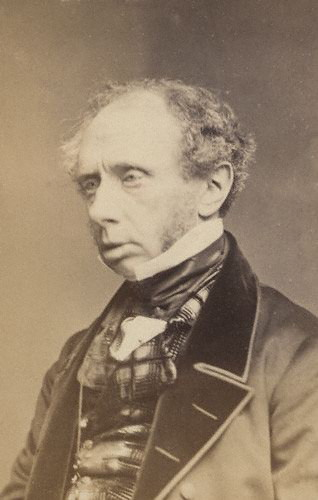
- Grey in the 1860s

Secretary at War
- In office 18 April 1835 – 27 September 1839
- Monarchs: William IV; Victoria
- Prime Minister: The Viscount Melbourne
- Preceded by: John Charles Herries
- Succeeded by: Thomas Babington Macaulay

Secretary of State for War and the Colonies
- In office 6 July 1846 – 21 February 1852
- Monarch: Victoria
- Prime Minister: Lord John Russell
- Preceded by: William Ewart Gladstone
- Succeeded by: Sir John Pakington, Bt

Member of the New South Wales Legislative Council
- In office 26 July 1848 – 31 October 1850
- Monarch: Victoria

Member of the House of Lords
- Lord Temporal
- Hereditary peerage 1863–1894
- Preceded by: The 2nd Earl Grey
- Succeeded by: The 4th Earl Grey

Personal details
- Born: 28 December 1802
- Died: 9 October 1894 (aged 91)
- Party: Whig
- Spouse: Maria Copley (d. 1879)
- Parent(s): Charles Grey, 2nd Earl Grey; The Hon. Mary Ponsonby

Henry George Grey, 3rd Earl Grey (28 December 1802 – 9 October 1894), known as Viscount Howick from 1807 until 1845, was an English statesman and cabinet minister in the government of the United Kingdom. He served as a member of the House of Commons from 1826 to 1841, then 1841 to 1845, when he moved to the House of Lords, where he sat until his death.

== Background ==
Grey was the eldest son of Charles Grey, 2nd Earl Grey, who served as prime minister in the 1830s, by his wife The Honorable Mary Ponsonby, daughter of William Ponsonby, 1st Baron Ponsonby.

He matriculated at Trinity College, Cambridge in 1821, graduating with a nobleman's MA in 1823.

== Political career ==
He was elected to the British House of Commons in 1826, under the title of Viscount Howick, as Whig member for Winchelsea, and then briefly for Higham Ferrers before settling for a northern constituency. Northumberland in 1831 was followed by North Northumberland after the Great Reform Act 1832. He remained in the parliaments dominated by his party and later by Lord Melbourne as prime minister.

On the accession of the Whigs to power in 1830, when his father became prime minister, he was made Under-Secretary of State for War and the Colonies. This gave him responsibility for Britain's colonial possessions and laid the foundation of his intimate acquaintance with colonial questions. He belonged at the time to the more advanced party of colonial reformers, sharing the views of Edward Gibbon Wakefield on questions of land and emigration, and resigned in 1834 from dissatisfaction that slave emancipation was made gradual instead of immediate. In 1835 he entered Lord Melbourne's cabinet as Secretary at War, and effected some valuable administrative reforms, especially by suppressing malpractices detrimental to the troops in India. After the partial reconstruction of the ministry in 1839, he again resigned, disapproving of the more advanced views of some of his colleagues.

These repeated resignations gave him a reputation for crotchetiness, which he did not decrease by his disposition to embarrass his old colleagues by his action on free trade questions in the session of 1841.

After being returned unopposed at the first three general elections in Northern division of Northumberland, Howick was defeated at the 1841 general election. He returned to the Commons after a few months absence, when he was elected for the borough of Sunderland at by-election in September 1841.

During the exile of the Liberals from power he went still farther on the path of free trade, and anticipated Lord John Russell's declaration against the corn laws. When, on Sir Robert Peel's resignation in December 1845, Lord John Russell was called upon to form a ministry, Howick, who had become Earl Grey by the death of his father in the preceding July, refused to enter the new cabinet if Lord Palmerston were foreign secretary. He was greatly censured for perverseness, and particularly when in the following July he accepted Lord Palmerston as a colleague without remonstrance. His conduct, nevertheless, afforded Lord John Russell an escape from an embarrassing situation.

Becoming colonial secretary in 1846, he found himself everywhere confronted with arduous problems, which in the main he overcame successfully. He was the first minister to proclaim that colonies were to be governed for their own benefit and not for the benefit of the mother country; the first systematically to accord them self-government so far as then seemed possible; the first to introduce free trade into their relations with Great Britain and Ireland. The concession by which colonies were allowed to tax imports from the mother-country ad libitum was not his; he protested against it but was overruled. In the West Indies he suppressed, if he could not overcome, discontent; in Ceylon he put down rebellion; in New Zealand he suspended the constitution he had himself accorded and yielded everything into the hands of Sir George Grey.

The least successful part of his administration was his treatment of the convict question at the Cape of Good Hope, which seemed an exception to his rule that the colonies were to be governed for their own benefit and in accordance with their own wishes, and subjected him to a humiliating defeat.

Frustrated that plans for a loan to relieve the Irish famine and fund emigration schemes from the area had failed, Grey developed plans for an alternative currency system to the Bank of England central bank model. It became known as a currency board, and he set up the first one in cooperation with James Wilson and the Mauritian colonial government in Mauritius.

His principal parliamentary appearances were when he moved for a committee on Irish affairs in 1866, and when in 1878 he passionately opposed the policy of the Beaconsfield cabinet in India. He nevertheless supported Lord Beaconsfield at the dissolution, regarding William Ewart Gladstone's accession to power with much greater alarm. He was a determined opponent of Gladstone's Home rule policy.

He sponsored an emigration scheme for Irish women to Australia. The Earl Grey Scheme operated between 1848 and 1850. Under it more than 4000 Irish orphan girls from Irish workhouses were shipped to Australia under an assisted passage scheme, in an effort to solve Australia's gender imbalance at that time and to aid in addressing the Irish famine and poverty.

In 1848 Grey was elected to the New South Wales Legislative Council representing the City of Melbourne despite never visiting the colony; his seat was declared vacant in 1850 due to his non-attendance. This election was a protest against rule from Sydney and in 1850 Grey introduced the Australian Constitutions Act 1850 (13 & 14 Vict. c. 59 (Imp)) which separated the district from New South Wales to become the colony of Victoria.

He resigned with his colleagues in February 1852. No room was found for him in the Aberdeen ministry formed in December that year, and although during the Crimean struggle public opinion pointed to him as the fittest man as minister for war, he never again held office.

During the remainder of his long life he exercised a vigilant criticism on public affairs. He wrote a history and defence of his colonial policy in the form of letters to Lord John Russell (Colonial Policy of Lord John Russell's Administration, 1853). In it, he states that "if it is desired that the elected body should not be a representation of a single interest and a single class of opinions," cumulative voting or proportional representation should be adopted.

In 1858 he wrote a work (republished in 1864) on parliamentary reform (the need for proportional representation and minority representation). In 1888 he wrote another on the state of Ireland and in 1892 one on the United States tariff. In his latter years he was a frequent contributor of weighty letters to The Times on land, tithes, currency and other public questions.

== Family ==
Lord Grey married on 9 August 1832, to Maria, daughter of Sir Joseph Copley, 3rd Baronet of Sprotborough. They had no children. She died in September 1879. Lord Grey survived her by fifteen years and died on 9 October 1894, aged 91. He was succeeded in the earldom by his nephew, Albert Grey (born 1851).

== Arms ==
Coat of arms of Henry Grey, 3rd Earl Grey
Crest A scaling ladder or, hooked and pointed sable. Escutcheon Quarterly, 1 & 4: Gules, a lion rampant, within a bordure engrailed, argent, in dexter chief point a mullet of the last; 2 & 3: Barry of six argent and azure, a bend gules charged with a bezant. Supporters Dexter, a lion guardant purpure, ducally crowned or; sinister, a tiger guardant, proper. Motto De bon vouloir servir le roy (To serve the king with good will). Orders The Most Noble Order of the Garter - Knight Companion (KG)

== Legacy ==
He was author of several books, including:

- Colonial Policy of the Administration of Lord John Russell (1853)

- Parliamentary government considered with reference to a reform of Parliament (1858)

- Parliamentary government considered with reference to a reform of Parliament. A new edition containing suggestions for improvement of our representative system...(1864)

The suburb of Howick in Auckland, New Zealand, is named after the earl.

Parliament of the United Kingdom
Preceded by William Leader; Henry Brougham	Member of Parliament for Winchelsea; 1826–1830; With: Henry Brougham to February 1830; John Williams from February 1830	Succeeded by Henry Dundas; John Williams
Preceded by Thomas Wentworth Beaumont; Matthew Bell	Member of Parliament for Northumberland; 1831–1832; With: Thomas Wentworth Beaumont	Constituency divided
New constituency	Member of Parliament for North Northumberland; 1832 – 1841; With: Lord Ossulston	Succeeded by Addison Cresswell; Lord Ossulston
Preceded by William Thompson; David Barclay	Member of Parliament for Sunderland; 1841 – 1845; With: David Barclay	Succeeded by George Hudson; David Barclay
Political offices
Preceded by Horace Twiss	Under-Secretary of State for War and the Colonies; 1830–1834	Succeeded by Sir John Shaw-Lefevre
Preceded by John Charles Herries	Secretary at War; 1835–1839	Succeeded by Thomas Babington Macaulay
Preceded by William Ewart Gladstone	Secretary of State for War and the Colonies; 1846–1852	Succeeded by Sir John Pakington, Bt
New South Wales Legislative Council
Preceded by Joseph Robinson (was Town of Melbourne)	Member for City of Melbourne; July 1848 – October 1850	Succeeded by William Westgarth
Honorary titles
Preceded by The Duke of Northumberland	Lord Lieutenant of Northumberland; 1847–1878	Succeeded by The Duke of Northumberland
Preceded by The Lord Ebury	Senior Privy Counsellor; 1893–1894	Succeeded by William Ewart Gladstone
Peerage of the United Kingdom
Preceded by Charles Grey	Earl Grey; 1845–1894	Succeeded by Albert Grey
