= Albert Grey, 4th Earl Grey =

British politician and Governor General of Canada

The Right Honourable The Earl Grey GCB GCMG GCVO PC
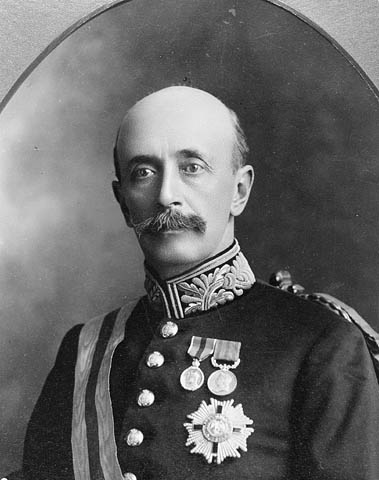

9th Governor General of Canada
- In office 10 December 1904 – 13 October 1911
- Monarchs: Edward VII; George V
- Prime Minister: Canadian • Wilfrid Laurier • Robert Borden; British • Arthur Balfour • Henry Campbell-Bannerman • H. H. Asquith
- Preceded by: The Earl of Minto
- Succeeded by: Prince Arthur, Duke of Connaught and Strathearn

More...

Personal details
- Born: 28 November 1851 London, England
- Died: 29 August 1917 (aged 65) Howick Hall, England
- Spouse: Alice Holford
- Children: 5, including Charles Grey, 5th Earl Grey and Lady Sybil Grey
- Parent(s): General Sir Charles Grey; Caroline Eliza Farquhar
- Education: Trinity College, Cambridge
- Football career
- Canadian Football Hall of Fame (Class of 1963)

Albert Henry George Grey, 4th Earl Grey (28 November 1851 – 29 August 1917) was a British peer and politician who served as Governor General of Canada from 1904 to 1911, the ninth since Canadian Confederation. He was a radical Liberal aristocrat and a member of a string of liberal high society clubs in London. An active and articulate campaigner in late Victorian England, he was associated with many of the leading Imperialists seeking change.

Albert Grey was born into a noble and political family, though at birth not in direct line to inherit the earldom. His father, General Charles Grey, was a younger brother of the 3rd Earl, who died without issue. As General Grey was deceased, the titles descended to his eldest living son Albert, then in his forties. Albert was educated at Harrow School before going up to Trinity College, Cambridge, where he graduated MA and LLM. His grandfather was the 2nd Earl Grey, who served as prime minister of the United Kingdom in the 1830s, whose name is connected to Earl Grey tea.

In 1878, Albert Grey entered into politics as a member of the Liberal Party and, after relinquishing a tied vote to his opponent, eventually won a place in the British House of Commons in 1880. In 1894 Grey inherited an earldom from his uncle, the third Earl, and thereafter took his place in the House of Lords, while simultaneously undertaking business ventures around the British Empire as Director of the British South Africa Company from 1898, he managed a steep learning curve during high level tension between the colonial administration and Boers, prior to the outbreak of the Second Boer War. As administrator in Rhodesia he was directly responsible to Cecil Rhodes for conduct of the colony's business from 1894 to 1897. On his return in 1899 he was appointed Lord Lieutenant of his native Northumberland.

Grey was appointed as Governor General of Canada by King Edward VII in 1904, on the recommendation of Prime Minister of the United Kingdom Arthur Balfour, to replace the Earl of Minto as viceroy and occupied that post until succeeded by Prince Arthur, Duke of Connaught and Strathearn, in 1911. Grey travelled extensively in Canada and was active in Canadian political affairs, including efforts to secure national unity. He built several legacies, the most prominent being the Grey Cup awarded to the national champion of Canadian football.

== Youth, education, and early career ==
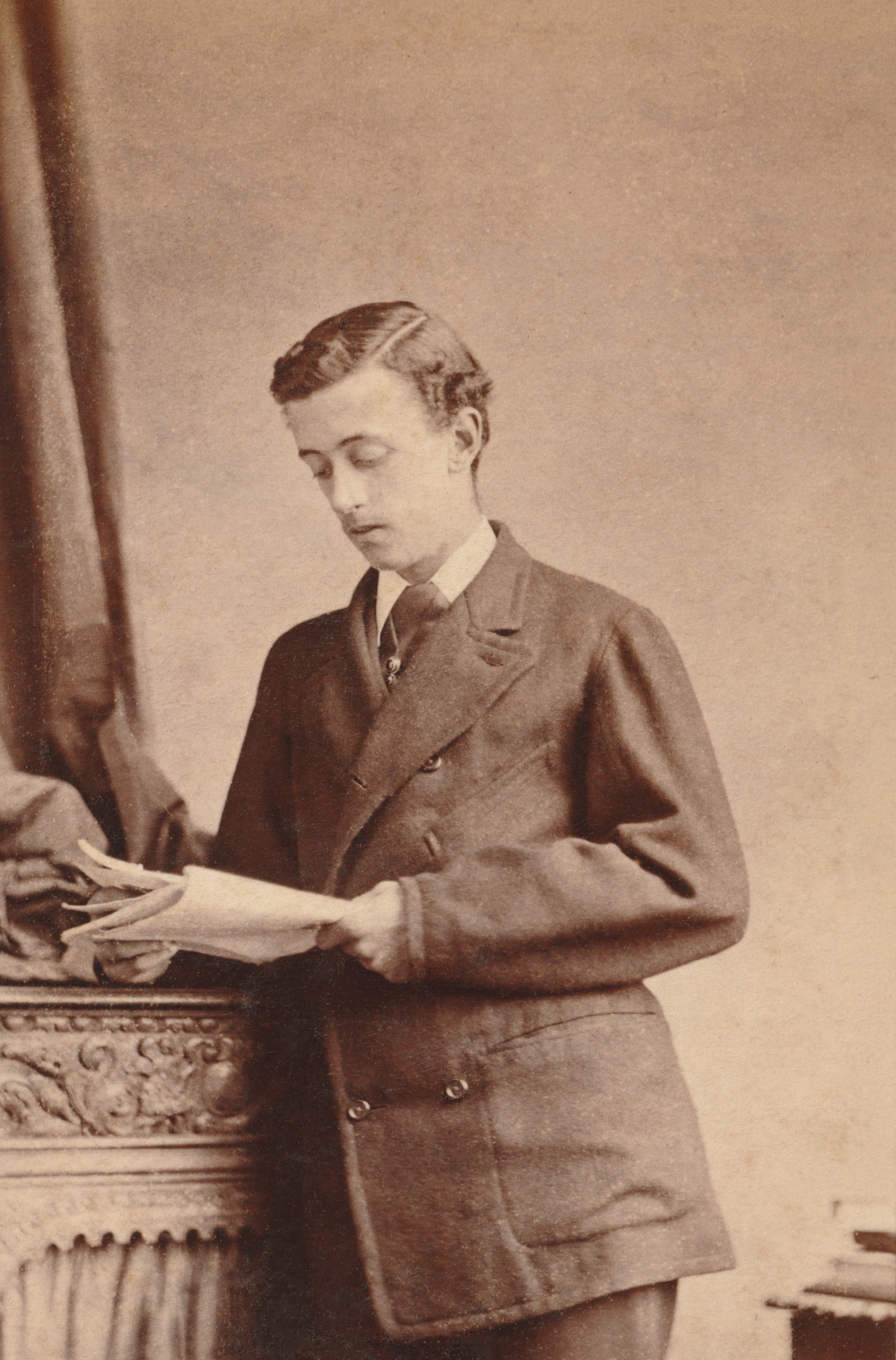
At Harrow

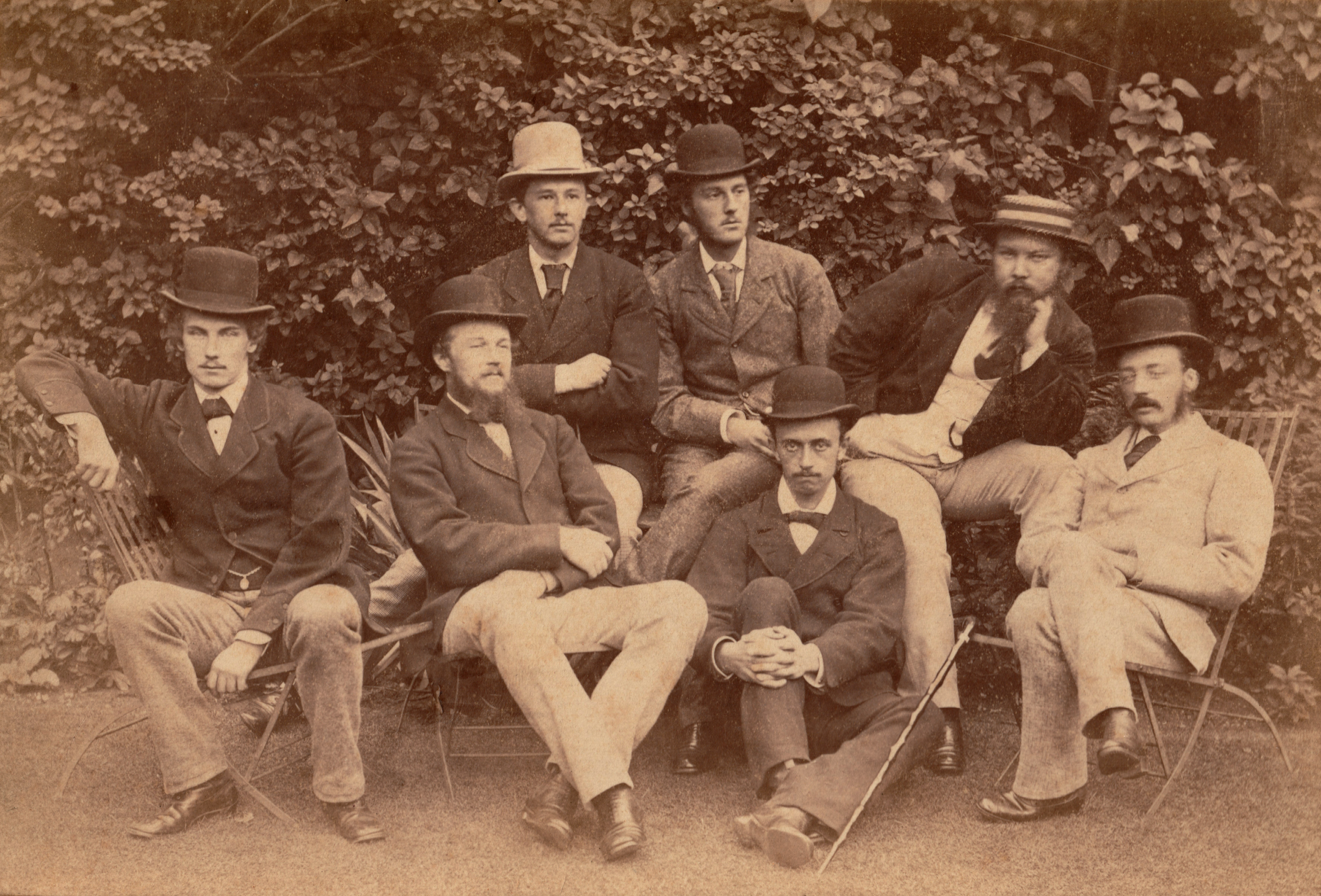
Grey in 1873 (front row, second from right), Shakespeare Society, Trinity College, Cambridge

Grey was the younger and only surviving son of General Sir Charles Grey—a younger son of former British prime minister the second Earl Grey and later the private secretary to Prince Albert and later still to Queen Victoria—and his wife, Caroline Eliza Farquhar, eldest daughter of Sir Thomas Harvie Farquhar, Bt. He was born at Cadogan House, Middlesex. Many members of the family had enjoyed successful political careers based on reform, including to colonial policies; Grey's grandfather, while prime minister, championed the Reform Act 1832 and in 1846, Grey's uncle, the third Earl Grey, as Secretary of State for War and the Colonies during the first ministry of Lord John Russell, was the first to suggest that colonies should be self-sustaining and governed for the benefit of their inhabitants, instead of for the benefit of the United Kingdom.

Grey was educated at Harrow School and then Trinity College, Cambridge, where he studied history and law. After graduating in 1873, Grey became private secretary to Sir Henry Bartle Frere and, as Frere was a member of the Council of India, Grey accompanied Prince Albert Edward, Prince of Wales, on his tour of India. In 1877, Grey married Alice Holford, daughter of Robert Stayner Holford, the Member of Parliament for East Gloucestershire. Together, they had five children, one of whom died in early childhood.

== Parliamentary and administrative career ==
Grey stood for parliament at South Northumberland in 1878 (at the age of 28). He received the same number of votes as his opponent Edward Ridley, but Grey declined a scrutiny and was not returned. It was not until the general election of 1880 that Grey, the Liberal Party candidate, was elected as a member of parliament (MP) for South Northumberland, a seat he held until it was replaced under the Redistribution of Seats Act 1885 and he moved to be the MP for Tyneside, following that year's election. In 1884 he wrote to the Manchester-based Women's Suffrage Journal declaring his support for women's suffrage, writing that "[t]here are no questions which receive so little attention, or which, in my opinion, so urgently call for the close and serious consideration of social reformers, as those affecting the condition of women. The possession of a vote by women who are heads of households will lead to the formation of associations and unions for the protection and advancement of the interests of their sex."

Another reform he supported was electoral reform, favouring proportional representation and Single transferable voting. He was active in the Proportional Representation Society of Britain. (At the time of his passing, he was its president). He organised a model STV election in Northumberland in 1885, remarkably using untrained coal miners as staff to conduct it successfully.

Inspired by the theories of Giuseppe Mazzini, Grey became an advocate of imperialism and was one of the founders of the Imperial Federation League, which sought to transform the British Empire into an Imperial Federation. Grey thus split with Prime Minister William Gladstone in 1886 over Irish home rule and became a Liberal Unionist, but the shift was short-lived as Grey failed to retain his seat in the 1886 general election.

Eight years later, in October 1894, Grey succeeded his uncle, the 3rd Earl Grey, as the 4th Earl Grey and returned to Parliament when taking his seat in the House of Lords. As a friend of Cecil Rhodes, Lord Grey became one of the first four trustees responsible for the administration of the scholarship funds which established the Rhodes Scholarship and he was invited by Rhodes to be a member of the board of directors and director of the British South Africa Company, coming to serve as the main liaison between Rhodes and the Secretary of State for the Colonies, Joseph Chamberlain, in the periods immediately before and after the Jameson Raid on the Transvaal. As the Administrator of Southern Rhodesia, Sir Leander Starr Jameson, was disgraced by the Jameson Raid, the British government, then headed by the Marquess of Salisbury, in 1896 asked Lord Grey to serve as Jameson's immediate replacement, staying in that role until 1897. Two years later, Grey was also appointed as Lord Lieutenant of Northumberland and published a brief biography of a young relative, Hubert Hervey, who was killed in the Second Matabele War.

== Governor General of Canada ==
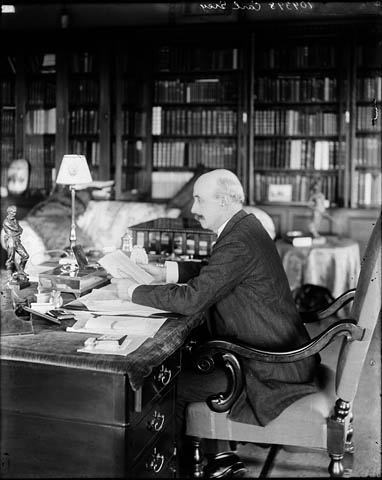
Grey in the governor general's office at Rideau Hall, Ottawa

=== In office ===
On 4 October 1904 announcement made that King Edward VII had, by commission under the royal sign-manual and signet, approved the recommendation of his British prime minister, Arthur Balfour, to appoint Grey as his representative to Canada, replacing Grey's brother-in-law, the Earl of Minto. (Minto was married to Grey's sister, Mary Caroline Grey.) The appointment came at a good time for Grey, as a series of failed investments in South Africa had left him penniless; a gift from his wife's aunt, Lady Wantage (widow of the Lord Wantage), was used to supplement his salary as governor general.

On 16 June 1905 Grey was designated as "Governor General of Canada and Commander-in-Chief of the Dominion of Canada," which followed on the passing of the Militia Act in 1904. At the request of Sir Robert Baden-Powell, Grey also undertook the role of Chief Scout of Canada.

During the time Grey occupied the viceregal office (1904–1911) Canada experienced large-scale immigration, industrialisation, and economic development, and secured increased independence from the United Kingdom.

It was with Grey's granting of Royal Assent to the appropriate Acts of Parliament that Alberta and Saskatchewan were separated from the North-West Territories to become provinces, The Governor General, writing to the King at the time, stated "[each one] a new leaf in Your Majesty's Maple Crown."

As Governor General, he travelled extensively around the growing country. He journeyed abroad to the Dominion of Newfoundland (then not yet a part of Canada) and several times to the United States to visit President Theodore Roosevelt, with whom Grey developed a strong bond.

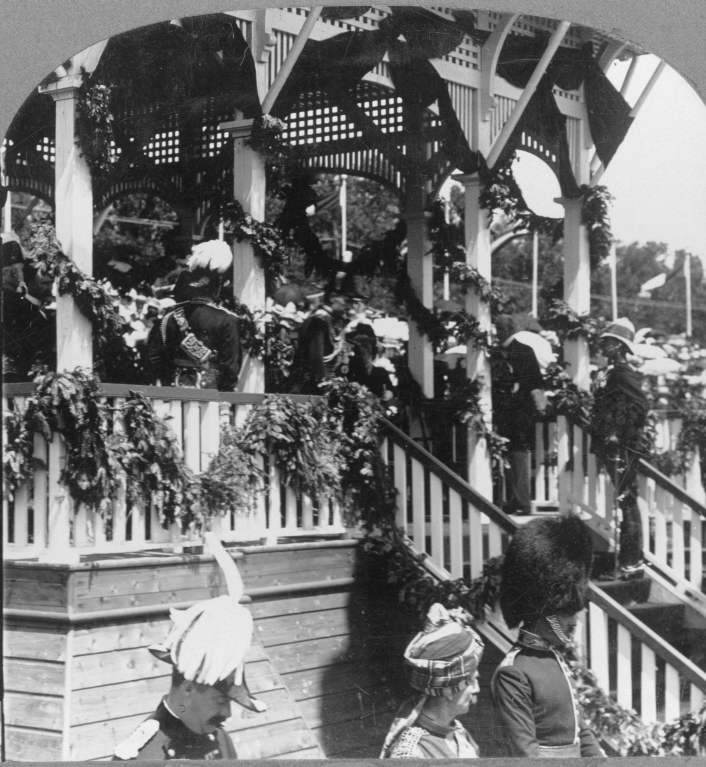
Grey with Prince George, Prince of Wales, at the celebrations of the tercentenary of Quebec in Quebec City, 24 July 1908

Grey often exercised his right, as representative of a constitutional monarch, to advise, encourage, and warn. He expressed his desire for social reform and national cohesion. He supported prison reforms to provide greater social justice. He was also an advocate for electoral reform, endorsing proportional representation. His past calls for political equality for Irish Catholics were relevant to Canada's internal politics, divided as the population was between Catholics and Protestants, Francophones and Anglophones. Shortly after his installment as Governor General, his office sent out inquiries to provincial legislatures as to what legislative measures had been taken on the principle of PR.

As governor General, Grey also encouraged his prime minister, Sir Wilfrid Laurier, to support the Imperial Federation he had long championed, but Laurier was uninterested. Grey suggested the construction of a railway hotel in the federal capital - the outcome was the palatial Château Laurier, completed in 1912.

Grey's years of urging Laurier to get the Cabinet and Parliament to agree to the idea of a Canadian navy were more fruitful. At the Governor General's urging, the Canadian and British governments agreed to have Canada assume control of the former British garrisons at Halifax, Nova Scotia, and Esquimalt, British Columbia, after which the Royal Canadian Navy was created by the Naval Service Act. The Act was so identified with Grey that, in Quebec, it was referred to as Grey's Bill and opposed by Henri Bourassa and his Ligue nationaliste canadienne.

Although Grey strongly promoted national unity among French and English Canadians, as well as advocating unity within the entire British Empire, his pronouncements frequently raised the ire of Bourassa and the Quebec nationalists. Grey helped plan the tercentennial of Quebec in 1908. This event marked the 300th anniversary of the landing of Samuel de Champlain at what later became Quebec City. The Cabinet agreed to Grey's suggestion to have the Plains of Abraham designated as a national park. this was to be done to coincide with the Quebec celebrations, and Grey believed the official ceremony would promote Franco-Anglo-American friendship. The government arranged for the attendance of the Prince of Wales (later King George V), American and French warships, and a host of visiting dignitaries. The Ligue saw the ceremony as solely a tribute to the Empire. Bourassa and other Quebec nationalists complained that Grey had transformed a day intended to celebrate Samuel de Champlain into a celebration of James Wolfe.

At other times, and unlike future viceroys, the Governor General's influence expanded blatantly into government policy. Grey initially supported Asian immigration to Canada. He opposed the head tax imposed by the Chinese Immigration Act of 1885 on Chinese immigrants to Canada. He was invited to visit the province of British Columbia but declined as protest against the exclusionary measures implemented by the BC government under premier Richard McBride. However, following the Japanese victory in the Russo-Japanese War, he expressed concerned about the so-called Yellow Peril and worked with the federal Cabinet to explore restrictions on Asian immigration other than the head tax. He was nevertheless appalled by the 1907 anti-Asian riots in Vancouver, organised by BC's Asiatic Exclusion League. Later that same year, he arranged a visit to Canada by Prince Fushimi Sadanaru of the Empire of Japan.

=== Legacy ===
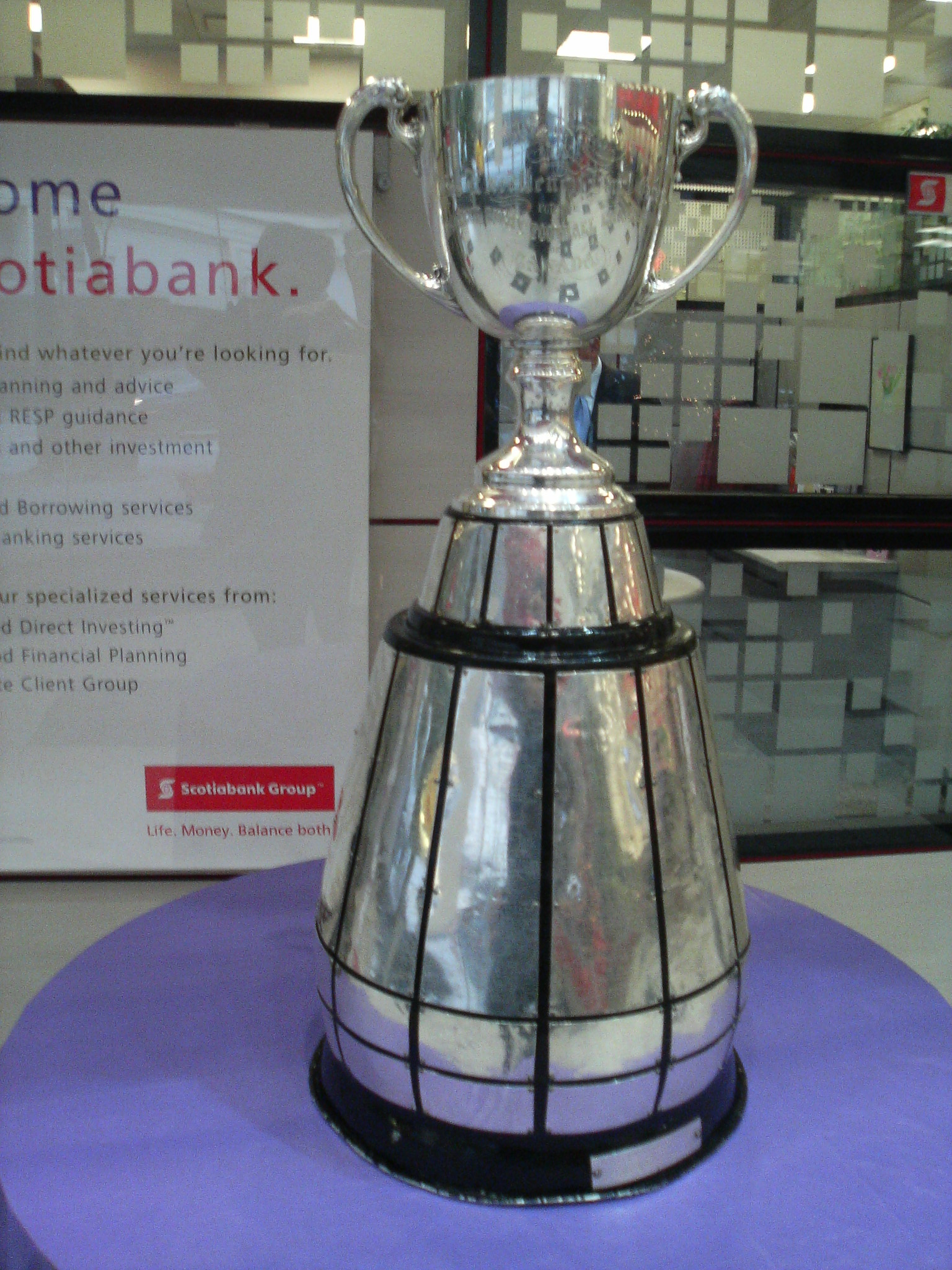
The Grey Cup

Throughout his tenure as governor general, Grey supported the arts and, when he departed Canada in 1911, he left behind him the Grey Competition for Music and Drama, first held in 1907. Grey also donated trophies to the Montreal Horse Show and for figure skating.

He was a patron of sport, his feelings on health and fitness a part of his broader desire for a reform movement. He supported Canadian football and established the Grey Cup, which is awarded to the winner of the Senior Amateur Football Championship of Canada; it is today presented to the champions of the professional-level Canadian Football League. In 1963 Grey was elected to the Canadian Football Hall of Fame for his contributions to the game.

He gave to the Crown a horse-drawn carriage he had purchased from the Governor-General of Australia, which is still today used as the state landau, and added a study and conservatory to Rideau Hall, the sovereign's and governor general's Ottawa residence; the latter was torn down in 1924.

Grey and his wife were commended for their work in Canada and for their championing social reforms. Laurier said Lord Grey gave "his whole heart, his whole soul, and his whole life to Canada."

== Final years ==
On leaving office in 1911 Earl Grey and his family returned to the United Kingdom, where he became president of the Royal Colonial Institute (now the Royal Commonwealth Society).

He did not retire from public affairs. He lobbied and organised toward several goals:

1. to help those who are endeavouring to fight the slums.

2. to help the worker forward in the path of his natural evolution from the status of worker to that of partner.

3. proportional representation – by "the removal of the disparity between Parliamentary constituencies with 40 thousand electors, on the one hand, and on the other, other constituencies with less than as many hundreds" (through creation of equal-sized single-member districts. Earl Grey was also a proponent of PR in the sense of elected representation reflecting how votes are cast. In 1916, he was honorary president of the Proportional Representation Society of Canada and president of the British PR Society.

4. Public House Trust [temperance refreshment houses], which is "a necessary adjunct to the first two items of his programme."

On 28 March 1916, he was appointed by King George V as Chancellor of the Order of St. Michael and St. George.

Grey died in August 1917 at his family residence. (On his deathbed, he penned a "stirring" letter to the editor of the London Times on the need to retain the adoption of proportional representation in the Electoral Reform Bill, being debated by British Parliament at the time.)

== Family ==
Earl and Countess Grey

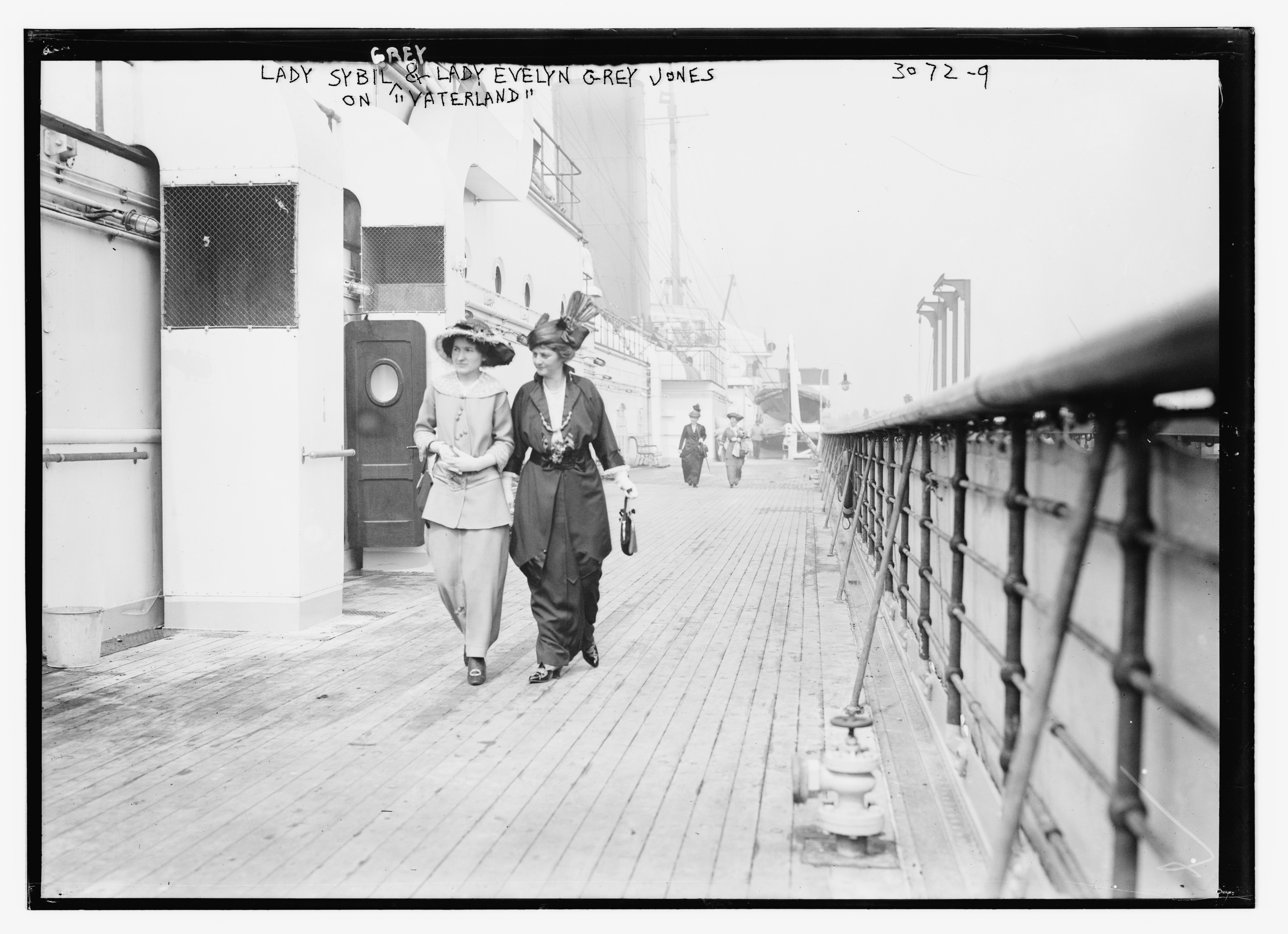
Lady Sybil Grey & Lady Evelyn Grey Jones, c. 1914

Grey married Alice Holford (d. 22 September 1944), daughter of Robert Stayner Holford, of Westonbirt House (Gloucestershire) and Dorchester House (London) on 9 June 1877 and had five children, one of whom died in early childhood:

1. Lady Victoria Mary Sybil Grey (9 June 1878 – 3 February 1907) married Lt-Col. Arthur Morton Grenfell, of Wilton Park in 1901, and had children.
2. Charles Robert Grey, 5th Earl Grey (15 December 1879 – 2 April 1963), who had two daughters by his wife Lady Mabel Laura Georgiana Palmer, daughter of William Palmer, 2nd Earl of Selborne. The elder daughter Mary (1907–2002) married the 1st Baron Howick of Glendale.
3. Lady Sybil Grey (15 July 1882 – 4 June 1966) O.B.E. married Lambert William Middleton (1877–1941) of Lowood House, Melrose, Scottish Borders, nephew of Sir Arthur Middleton, 7th Baronet and Frederick Edmund Meredith. She was invested as an Officer, Order of the British Empire in 1918, having served as the Commandant of the Dorchester House Hospital for Officers. She was well known for her work with the Red Cross in Russia during WWI, and for her work with tuberculosis sufferers (founding the Lady Grey Society). She was an amateur photographer and filmmaker of note, and recorded village life at Darnick and St. Boswells. After her husband died she sold Lowood House and moved to Burley, Hampshire. They had a son and a daughter.
4. Lady Evelyn Alice Grey (14 Mar 1886–15 Apr 1971) married Sir Lawrence Evelyn Jones, 5th Bt. M.C., grandson of Sir Willoughby Jones.
5. Lady Lillian Winifred Grey (11 June 1891 – 7 April 1895)

== Ancestry ==
Ancestors of Albert Grey, 4th Earl Grey

8. Charles Grey, 1st Earl Grey
4. Charles Grey, 2nd Earl Grey
9. Elizabeth Grey
2. Sir Charles Grey
10. William Ponsonby, 1st Baron Ponsonby
5. Mary Elizabeth Ponsonby
11. The Hon. Louisa Molesworth
1. Albert Grey, 4th Earl Grey
12. Sir Walter Farquhar, 1st Baronet, of Cadogan House
6. Sir Thomas Harvie Farquhar, 2nd Baronet, of Cadogan House
13. Anne Stevenson
3. Caroline Eliza Farquhar
14. Reverend Morton Rockcliffe
7. Sybella Martha Rockcliffe
15. Martha Bennett

== Honours ==
Ribbon bars of the Earl Grey

Appointments

- (United Kingdom) 13 March 1899 – 22 January 1901: Her Majesty's Lieutenant and Custos Rotulorum of the County of Northumberland
  - 22 January 1901 – 13 December 1904: His Majesty's Lieutenant and Custos Rotulorum of the County of Northumberland
- (United Kingdom) 7 October 1904 – 28 March 1916: Knight Commander of the Most Distinguished Order of Saint Michael and Saint George (KCMG)
  - 28 March 1916 – 29 August 1917: Chancellor of the Most Distinguished Order of Saint Michael and Saint George (KCMG)
- 1907 – 13 October 1911: Chief Scout for Canada
- (United Kingdom) 23 July 1908 – 29 August 1917: Knight Grand Cross of the Royal Victorian Order (GCVO)
- (United Kingdom) 29 June 1909 – 29 August 1917: Member of His Majesty's Most Honourable Privy Council (PC)
- (United Kingdom) 3 March 1910 – 29 August 1917: Knight of Grace of the Most Venerable Order of the Hospital of Saint John of Jerusalem (KStJ)
- (United Kingdom) 18 March 1910 – 29 August 1917: Honorary Colonel of the Northumberland Fusiliers 6th Battalion
- (United Kingdom) 23 October 1911 – 29 August 1917: Knight Grand Cross of the Most Honourable Order of the Bath (GCB)

Medals

- (United Kingdom) 1902: King Edward VII Coronation Medal
- (United Kingdom) 1911: King George V Coronation Medal

=== Honorary military appointments ===
- (Canada) 10 December 1904 – 13 October 1911: Colonel of the Governor General's Horse Guards
- (Canada) 10 December 1904 – 13 October 1911: Colonel of the Governor General's Foot Guards
- (Canada) 10 December 1904 – 13 October 1911: Colonel of the Canadian Grenadier Guards

=== Honorific eponyms ===
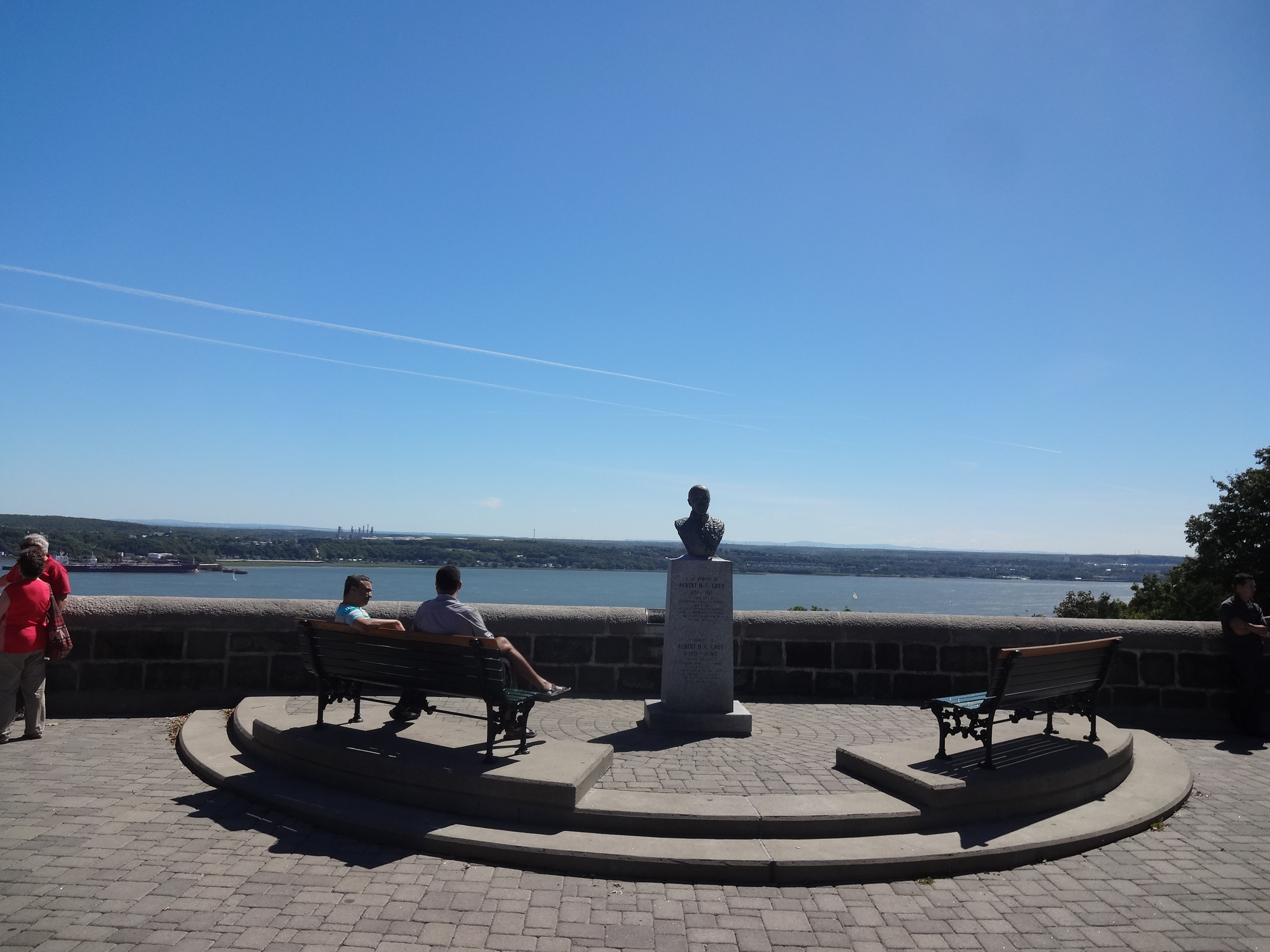
Statue of the Earl Grey at Parc des Champs de Bataille, Quebec City

Geographic locations

- Saskatchewan: Earl Grey
- British Columbia: Mount Earl Grey
- British Columbia: Earl Grey Pass

Schools

- Manitoba: Earl Grey Public School, Winnipeg
- Saskatchewan: Earl Grey School, Earl Grey
- Ontario: Earl Grey Senior Public School, Toronto

=== Arms ===
Coat of arms of Albert Grey, 4th Earl Grey
Crest A scaling ladder or, hooked and pointed sable. Escutcheon Quarterly, 1 & 4: Gules, a lion rampant, within a bordure engrailed, argent, in dexter chief point a mullet or; 2 & 3: Barry of six argent and azure, a bend gules charged with a bezant. Supporters Dexter, a lion guardant purpure, ducally crowned or; sinister, a tiger guardant, proper. Motto De bon vouloir servir le roy (To serve the king with good will). Orders The Most Honourable Order of the Bath - Knight Grand Cross (GCB)

Government offices
Preceded by Leander Starr Jameson	Administrator of Southern Rhodesia; 1896–1898	Succeeded by William Henry Milton as Senior Administrator of Southern Rhodesia
Preceded by The Earl of Minto	Governor General of Canada; 1904–1911	Succeeded by Prince Arthur, Duke of Connaught and Strathearn
Parliament of the United Kingdom
Preceded by Wentworth Beaumont; Edward Ridley	Member of Parliament for South Northumberland; 1880–1885; Served alongside: Wentworth Beaumont	Constituency abolished
New constituency	Member of Parliament for Tyneside; 1885–1886	Succeeded by Wentworth Beaumont
Non-profit organization positions
Preceded by New position	President of the International Co-operative Alliance; 1895–1917; With: Henry William Wolff (1895–1907); William Maxwell (1907–1917)	Succeeded by William Maxwell
Honorary titles
Preceded by The 6th Duke of Northumberland	Lord Lieutenant of Northumberland; 1899–1904	Succeeded by The 7th Duke of Northumberland
Peerage of the United Kingdom
Preceded by Henry Grey	Earl Grey; 1894–1917	Succeeded by Charles Grey
