= Matthew Bell (British politician) =

British coal owner and politician (1793–1871)

- Born: 18 April 1793
- Died: 28 October 1871 (aged 78)
- Occupation: politician

Matthew Bell (18 April 1793 – 28 October 1871) was a British coal owner and Conservative politician who was a member of parliament (MP) for Northumberland, 1826–1831, and South Northumberland, 1832–1852.

He was Sheriff of Northumberland for 1816–1817.

Parliament of the United Kingdom
Preceded by Charles John Brandling; Thomas Wentworth Beaumont	Member of Parliament for Northumberland; 1826 – 1831; With: Thomas Wentworth Beaumont to July 1826; Hon Henry Liddell July 1826 – 1830; Thomas Wentworth Beaumont from 1830	Succeeded by Thomas Wentworth Beaumont; Viscount Howick
New constituency	Member of Parliament for South Northumberland; 1832 – 1852; With: Thomas Wentworth Beaumont 1832–37; Christopher Blackett 1837–41; Saville Craven Henry Ogle 1841–52	Succeeded by Wentworth Beaumont; Hon. Henry Liddell
