= Hostmen of Newcastle upon Tyne =

Coal merchant business monopoly cartel

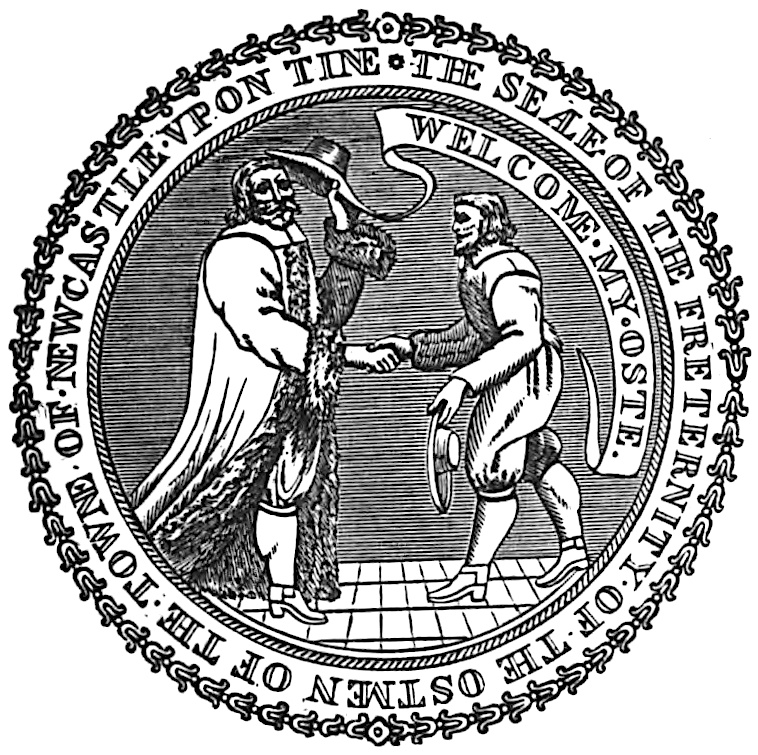
Seal of the Company of Hostmen of Newcastle-upon-Tyne, as remade in 1649

The Incorporated Company of Hostmen of Newcastle upon Tyne, often called the Hostmen's Company of Newcastle, is a company incorporated by royal charter of 22 March 1599/1600. Analogous to a livery company of the City of London, it still exists. It is best known to economic historians as a cartel of businessmen who formed a monopoly to control the export of coal from the River Tyne in North East England. They were so known from the medieval practice of "hosting", whereby local businessmen provided visiting merchants with accommodation and introduced them to local traders. The Hostmen acted as middlemen with whom the coal producers and those who shipped the coal to London and elsewhere were forced to deal.

== Beginnings ==
From the time in the mid-13th century when coal began to be exported from the River Tyne, the burgesses of Newcastle tried to gain a monopoly over its export. In 1216, King John granted Newcastle the right to elect a mayor and also to form trade guilds. These guilds sought to ensure that trade in various commodities was concentrated in Newcastle. The desire of the Newcastle burgesses to monopolise trade on the Tyne led to a dispute with the Prior of Tynemouth regarding the shipment of coal from the nearby settlement of North Shields, which was owned by the priory. In 1267 the mayor of Newcastle, Nicholas Scott attacked North Shields with a band of merchants, setting fire to several buildings. In 1290 the burgesses petitioned the King regarding North Shields and succeeded in suspending the export of coal, as well as other trade, from the new settlement. Henceforth, North Shields remained solely as a fishing port. In 1350 Edward III granted a licence to the Newcastle burgesses to excavate coal from Forth Banks and the Town Moor area. From 1446, shipments of coal from North Shields were permitted, but in 1530 a royal act confined all shipments of coal to Newcastle quayside, thereby giving the Newcastle burgesses the monopoly they desired. This reinforced a medieval monopoly granted by Henry I, which was still in place.

== The Reformation ==
Prior to the Reformation, most of the north-eastern coal deposits were in the hands of the monasteries. The monasteries leased out land for mining but generally set limits on the rate of extraction so as to keep the price high. This meant that the production of coal stayed at a constant level. After the dissolution of the monasteries in 1539, the coal deposits fell into private hands and the restrictions on output disappeared. The yearly rate of extraction increased from approximately 15,000 tons prior to the Reformation, to 162,000 in 1603, to 239,000 in 1609 and to 425,000 in 1634, nearly all for export from the Tyne. Coal was exported to London and other parts of England, but also to Holland, France, and Flanders. Coal became by far the most valuable local commodity. As with other traded items, coal could only move through the city of Newcastle if its buying and selling were handled by the town's burgesses. The Hostmen had formed a group within the Company of Merchant Adventurers of Newcastle to exploit this monopoly. In practice, the Hostmen owned the "keels", large boats that were used to transfer the coal from the riverbank to the waiting colliers that were moored downstream. The men who worked these boats were known as "keelmen". The keelmen led a very precarious existence, being paid casually, and they were regarded with distrust by the Hostmen with whom they were often in dispute.

== Gateshead ==
In 1553, during the reign of Edward VI, John Dudley, the Duke of Northumberland sponsored an act allowing Newcastle to annex Gateshead and its surrounding area from the bishopric of Durham. This would have allowed the Newcastle burgesses to mine for coal on Gateshead land. The plan was foiled by the death of Edward and the downfall of Dudley. The Newcastle burgesses made a similar attempt in 1576 during the reign of Elizabeth I but were opposed by the queen's privy council.

== The Grand Lease ==
Towards the end of the 16th century, the Hostmen began to buy up leases in the Tyneside coalfield until they soon had a near total monopoly of the production of coal. This move was aided in 1583 when Queen Elizabeth leased the ex-palatinate mines of Gateshead and Whickham to two Newcastle merchants, Henry Anderson and William Selby, who in turn apportioned them to the leading Hostmen. This became known as the "Grand Lease", and the Hostmen came to be known as the "Lords of Coal", as they now controlled both production and export of this commodity. In 1590 the lord mayor of London complained that the regulation of coal exports from the Tyne was unfairly raising prices.

== Incorporation ==
In 1600 the Company of Hostmen was incorporated through a charter granted by Elizabeth I. This gave them exclusive rights to trade coal in the Tyne in return for a one-shilling tax on every chaldron (wagonload) of coal shipped from the Tyne. The charter allowed an exclusive body of electors, in practice the Hostmen, the right to elect the mayor and burgesses of the town. In 1600, 240,000 tons of coal were shipped from the Tyne, 20 times more than the tonnage produced by the Durham coal industry and shipped from the River Wear.

The tightly knit Hostmen, with their cartel and control of the Tyne, now controlled the coal production business. They had capital and economies of scale on their side. Few local coal entrepreneurs could survive if they were not members of the Company of Hostmen. The Commons in 1621 included the Newcastle Hostmen in a list of monopolists who should have their privileges revoked, but the Statute of Monopolies (21 Jas. 1. c. 3) specifically exempted them.

Nor to the liberties of Newcastle-upon-Type, nor to licences of keeping taverns;

XII. Provided also, and be it enacted, That this act, or any declaration, provision, penalty, forfeiture, or other thing before mentioned, shall not extend or be prejudicial to any use, custom, prescription, franchise, freedom, jurisdiction, immunity, liberty, or privilege, heretofore claimed, used or enjoyed by the governors and stewards, and brethren of the fellowship of the hoast-men of town of Newcastle-upon-Tyne, or by the ancient fellowship, guild or fraternity, commonly called hoast-men, for or concerning the selling, carrying, lading, disposing, shipping, venting or trading of or for any sea-coals, stone-coals or pit-coals, forth or out of the haven and river of Tyne; or to any grant made by the said governor and stewards, and brethren of the fellowship of the said hoast-men, to the late Queen Elizabeth, of any duty or sum of money to be paid for or in respect of any such coals as aforesaid: nor to any grants, letters patents or commission, heretofore granted, or hereafter to be granted, of, for or concerning the licensing of the keeping of any tavern or taverns, or selling, uttering, or retailing of wines to be drunk or spent in the mansion house or houses, or other place in the tenure or occupation of the party or parties so selling or uttering the same or for or concerning the making of any compositions for such licenses, so as the benefit of such compositions be reserved and applied to and for the use of his Majesty, his heirs or successors, and not to the private use of any other person or persons. — Statute of Monopolies (21 Jas. 1. c. 3), section 12.

== Scottish invasion ==
In 1637 Charles I, in an attempt to raise revenue, doubled the tax on Tyneside coal in return for allowing the Hostmen to regulate production and set the price of the coal. The London coal importers and the East Anglian ship-owners were outraged and resolved to boycott Tyneside coal. As a result, the price of coal rose and the royal revenues dropped. Charles was forced to cancel the Hostmen's monopoly. When the Scots rose in 1639 against Charles' introduction of the English Prayer Book into Scotland, the anti-royalist London merchants encouraged the invading Scots to capture Newcastle. This they did in 1640, totally disrupting the export of coal. The Scottish army remained in Newcastle for a year and charged the Corporation a regular fee for billeting its troops.

== Civil War ==
When the First English Civil War began in August 1642, most of the Newcastle burgesses sided with the Royalists and in 1644 Parliamentarian forces blockaded the Tyne river to prevent them exporting coal, cutting supplies to London. To ease this situation Parliament encouraged the export of coal from Blyth and from Wearside, but not enough coal was available from those sources to replace that shipped from Newcastle. In October 1644, Scottish troops captured Newcastle after an eight month siege, then occupied Northumberland and Durham for two years, levying taxes from the coal trade to pay their costs. After the Second English Civil War ended in 1648, the Royalist burgesses were replaced by Parliamentarian sympathisers who proved just as anxious to maintain Newcastle's trading monopoly as their predecessors. In 1655, Ralph Gardiner of Chirton accused the Corporation of "tyranny and oppression" after he was imprisoned for contravening the monopoly of the Bakers and Brewers Company of Newcastle by brewing in North Shields, and unsuccessfully petitioned Parliament to abolish the regulations forcing traders to deal through Newcastle.

== Decline of its trading privileges ==
The Civil War had allowed the River Wear to emerge as a competitor of the Tyne for coal exports. By 1660 the Tyne coal trade had recovered but was now only a third greater than the Wearside production. At this time the Newcastle Hostmen clashed with the Sunderland coal traders by claiming their charter rights and imposing a shilling tax on all coals exported from Sunderland. The Newcastle monopoly continued until coal production increased to such an extent between 1700 and 1750 that non-Hostmen businessmen were drawn in. This seriously weakened the strength of the Hostmen and they would never again have such a stranglehold on the north-east coal trade.

== List of governors of the Society of Hostmen ==
The following is a list of governors from 1600 to 1800 .

- 1600 William Jennison (MP for Newcastle)
- 1601 George Selbie (MP for Newcastle)
- 1602 Francis Anderson (Mayor of Newcastle 1601, 1612)
- 1603 Robert Dudley (Mayor of Newcastle 1602)
- 1604 Thomas Ridell (MP for Newcastle)
- 1605–1606 William Jennison (MP for Newcastle)
- 1607 George Selbie (MP for Newcastle)
- 1608 James Clavering (Mayor of Newcastle 1607, 1618)
- 1609 Henry Chapman (MP for Newcastle)
- 1610 Thomas Liddell (MP for Newcastle)
- 1611 Francis Anderson (Mayor of Newcastle 1601, 1612)
- 1612 George Selbie (MP for Newcastle)
- 1613 Francis Anderson (Mayor of Newcastle 1601, 1612)
- 1614–1615 Thomas Ridell (MP for Newcastle)
- 1616 George Selbie (MP for Newcastle)
- 1617 James Clavering (Mayor of Newcastle 1607, 1618)
- 1627 Peter Riddell (MP for Newcastle)
- 1636–1637 Thomas Liddell (MP for Newcastle)
- 1638 Thomas Marley
- 1639 Sir Lyonel Maddison (Mayor of Newcastle 1617)
- 1640 Robert Anderson (Mayor of Newcastle 1630)
- 1641 Nicholas Cole (Bt Mayor of Newcastle 1640, 1641)
- 1642–1643 Leonard Carr (Sheriff of Newcastle 1636)
- 1644 Sir John Marley (MP for Newcastle, Mayor of Newcastle 1644)
- 1645 Sir Lyonel Maddison (Mayor of Newcastle 1617)
- 1646–1652 Ralph Grey
- 1653–1654 Leonard Carr (Sheriff of Newcastle 1636)
- 1655 -1659 Robert Shafto (Sheriff of Northumberland 1653)
- 1660–1661 John Emerson (Mayor of Newcastle 1660)
- 1662–1663 William Blackett (MP for Newcastle)
- 1664 Sir James Clavering, bart (MP for Newcastle)
- 1665 Sir Francis Liddell, (Mayor of Newcastle 1664)
- 1666 Henry Maddison (Mayor of Newcastle 1665)
- 1667–1668 William Blackett (MP for Newcastle)
- 1669–1674 Ralph Jennison (Sheriff of Northumberland 1660, Mayor of Newcastle 1668)
- 1675 Thomas Jennison (Mayor of Newcastle 1674)
- 1676 Sir Francis Anderson (MP for Newcastle)
- 1677–1683 Sir Ralph Carr (MP for Newcastle)
- 1684 Sir William Blackett (MP for Newcastle)
- 1685 William Aubone (mayor of Newcastle 1686)
- 1686 Sir Henry Brabant, knt (Mayor of Newcastle 1685)
- 1687 Nicholas Cole (Mayor of Newcastle)
- 1688 Sir William Creagh, knt. (Mayor of Newcastle 1687)
- 1689 Mr Thomas Bewick
- 1690 William Carr (Mayor of Newcastle)
- 1691–1692 Sir William Blackett (MP for Newcastle)
- 1693 George Harrison
- 1694 Nicholas Fenwick (Mayor of Newcastle 1697)
- 1695–1700 William Aubone
- 1701–1704 Matthew White (Mayor of Newcastle 1691, 1703)
- 1705–1707 Sir Ralph Carr (MP for Newcastle)
- 1708 Henry Riddell
- 1709–1711 Robert Fenwick (Mayor of Newcastle)
- 1712–1715 Matthew White (Mayor of Newcastle 1691, 1703)
- 1716–1714 Richard Ridley (Mayor of Newcastle (1713)
- 1725–1727 Sir William Blackett (MP for Newcastle)
- 1728–1740 George Liddell (MP for Newcastle)
- 1740–1745 John Ord (Mayor of Newcastle 1744)
- 1745-? John Simpson.
- c. 1800 J. E. Blackett (MP for Newcastle)

== Its records ==
In 1901 the Surtees Society published Extracts from the Records of the Company of Hostmen of Newcastle-Upon-Tyne, ed. F.W. Dendy, with a detailed introduction and preface by the editor. There were supplements in 1931.

== See also ==
Limitation of the Vend
