= William Selby (died 1612) =

English Member of Parliament and soldier

William Selby (died 1612), was an English member of parliament and soldier at Berwick upon Tweed.

== Biography ==
William Selby was a son of Sir John Selby of Branxton and Twizell and his wife Margaret. He was knighted on 10 June 1603. The Selby family had several branches in Northumberland.

According to the inscription on his tomb at St Peter's Ightham, William Selby was a soldier at the Siege of Leith in 1560, at Newhaven in France, at the capture of Edinburgh Castle in 1573, and at Hume Castle in 1569. He served in Ireland for three years and was governor of Amersfoort in the Netherlands.

Because of his skill in the French language, the English diplomat Robert Bowes employed him to escort the French favourite Esmé Stewart, 1st Duke of Lennox south from Berwick-upon-Tweed in December 1582.

Selby served with the Earl of Leicester in the Netherlands in 1586. The Selby family had a feud with Sir Cuthbert Collingwood. On 6 November 1586 Collingwood was returning from Newcastle to his home, with his wife and daughter, when he encountered William Selby and his armed followers. Collingwood was shot but survived, and one of his companions William Clavering was killed.

Selby was made a Captain at Berwick in 1587, and a gentleman porter at Berwick in 1595 jointly with his nephew, also "William Selby". He was member of Parliament for Berwick in 1589, 1593, 1597, 1601 and 1604.

In December 1590 Selby, already described as gentleman porter, was instructed to take an inventory of arms and gunpowder at Berwick and Carlisle. In 1591 he came to London to apply unsuccessfully for the position of Comptroller of Berwick. At this time he purchased Ightham Mote from Charles Allen. In 1593 John Carey noted that he held three fee paying positions at Berwick but had not been seen in the town for two years. On account of his track record as an "absentee pensioner" and poor management skills, in December 1593 Carey wrote to William Cecil advising that Selby should not be appointed Comptroller of the Works in the place of Nicolas Errington, who had recently died, because as comptroller Selby would make all at Berwick "weary of their places".

In May 1594 William's brother-in-law, Captain George Selby captured two fugitives from the Scottish court, Jacob Kroger a goldsmith serving Anne of Denmark and Guillaume Martyn, a French attendant in the stables of James VI of Scotland. They had taken some jewelry belonging to the queen. A letter of John Carey gives some details. According to Carey the two men absconded because they had not been paid. They crossed the Tweed near Kelso and came to Tweedmouth. The Earl of Bothwell, who was a fugitive in the north of England, met them at North Shields and took all their possessions. Then George Selby and Thomas Power of Tynemouth arrested them, and they were handed over to the Scottish depute warden of the East March by William's father, Sir John Selby of Twizell. The two men were taken to Edinburgh and executed.

In 1595, Selby was involved in claiming back pay for himself and his soldiers. In August 1596 he achieved his ambition to be Comptroller of Ordinance in the North and reported on the state of the iron gates of Berwick which were consumed with rust. He claimed his authority was less than that granted to Errington and complained that Lord Scrope at Carlisle Castle had refused to allow his officer to carry out an inspection. Selby's father, John Selby died on 20 November 1595, and soon after a Scottish raiding party led by William Kerr of Cessford robbed his mother's barns at Twizell and Weetwood near Wooler.

On 27 March 1603, William Selby, as Gentlemen Porter of Berwick, rode to Holyrood Palace to hand the keys of Berwick to James VI of Scotland at the Union of the Crowns, and on 6 April 1603 the king knighted him at Berwick. Selby became keeper of Tynemouth Castle in 1607.

Selby died at Ightham Mote in Kent on New Year's day 1612. His estates passed to his nephew, William Selby (died 1638).
