= Cuthbert Collingwood (died 1597) =

English landowner

Cuthbert Collingwood (d. 1597) was an English landowner.

He was the son of John Collingwood and Ursula Buckton. His family homes were Eslington.

He was captured at the Raid of the Redeswire in 1575 and taken to Scotland, where he was held for a time in Dalkeith Palace, the residence of Regent Morton. A ballad about this border incident calls Collingwood "that courteous knight". On 28 July 1587 a force from the Scottish border attacked Eslington and he was forced to flee. Two of his servants were injured and three horses were taken.

Collingwood had a feud with the Selby of Twizell family. On 6 November 1586 he was returning from Newcastle to his home, with his wife and daughter, when he encountered William Selby, son of John Selby. Collingwood was shot but survived, and one of his companions William Clavering was killed.

== Marriage and family ==
Collingwood married Dorothy Bowes, a daughter of Sir George Bowes of Dalden. Their children included:

- Thomas Collingwood (d. 1597), who married Anne Grey, a daughter of Ralph Grey of Chillingham
- Mary Collingwood, who married James Clavering, eldest son of Robert Clavering of Callelie.
- Fortune Collingwood, who married Henry Anderson
- Dorothy Collingwood, who married Nicholas Thorneton
- Jane Collingwood, who married William Read
- Rebecca Collingwood, who married (1) Thomas Salvin, (2) Frobisher
- Travenian Collingwood
- Katherine Collingwood
