= List of Freemen of the City of Newcastle upon Tyne =

The following people, military units, and groups have received the Honorary Freedom of the City of Newcastle upon Tyne. Other lists are maintained by the City of Newcastle upon Tyne of those Freemen and women who trace their freedom to the original Trade Gilds of the City, usually by patrimony.

== Individuals ==
=== 17th Century ===
- William Cavendish, 1st Duke of Newcastle: September 1642.
- Sir George Baker: September 1643.
- Sir William Armine: April 1645.
- Richard Barvis: April 1645.
- Robert Fenwick: April 1645.
- Sir Arthur Haselrig: September 1649.
- Edmon Styole: January 1652.
- John Rushforth: August 1652.
- Sidenham: November 1652.
- Thomas Bantiff: January 1653.
- William Hilton: August 1654.
- Colonel Charles Howard: January 1655.
- Sir Thomas Widdrington: September 1657.
- Thomas Parles: February 1660.
- Francis Nicholls: July 1660.
- Colonel Sir Edward Villiers: September 1662.
- Sir William Forster: September 1665.
- Henry Cavendish, Earl of Ogle: June 1667.
- John Maitland, 1st Duke of Lauderdale: October 1672.
- James Aire: December 1672.
- John Cockburn: April 1674.
- William Lilburne: July 1674.
- George Johnson: September 1674.
- Lionell Vane: August 1681.
- Robert Mitford: October 1681.
- William Ramsay: September 1683.
- Henry Lambton: September 1685.
- George Johnson: September 1696.
- Sir St John Conyers: September 1697.
- Sir Baldwin Conyers: September 1697.
- John Ord: October 1699.

=== 18th Century ===
- John Cuthbert: September 1707.
- Martin Bryson: January 1725.
- Richard Lumley, 2nd Earl of Scarbrough: July 1733.
- William Anysley: July 1737.
- Edward Collingwood: September 1738.
- Thomas Lumley-Saunderson, 3rd Earl of Scarbrough: September 1742.
- James Lumley: September 1742.
- Hugh Percy, 1st Duke of Northumberland: May 1753.
- William Pitt: April 1757.
- Henry Bilson-Legge: April 1757.
- William Gibson: September 1760.
- Prince Henry, Duke of Cumberland and Strathearn: August 1771.
- Christopher Fawcett: October 1771.
- Prince Frederick, Duke of York and Albany: June 1795.
- Prince William Henry, Duke of Gloucester and Edinburgh: June 1796.

=== 19th Century ===
- Hugh Percy, 3rd Duke of Northumberland: June 1818.
- Prince Augustus Frederick, Duke of Sussex: August 1822.
- Field Marshal Arthur Wellesley, 1st Duke of Wellington: September 1827.
- Charles Vane, 3rd Marquess of Londonderry: November 1827.
- James Losh: January 1833.
- Sir William George Armstrong: September 1886.
- Sir Henry Morton Stanley: May 1890.
- Sir Charles Frederick Hamond: October 1890.
- William Ewart Gladstone: August 1891.
- Field Marshal Lord Roberts of Kandahar: January 1894.
- Field Marshal Garnet Wolseley, 1st Viscount Wolseley: July 1899.

=== 20th Century ===
- William Watson-Armstrong, 1st Baron Armstrong: May 1901.
- Lieutenant General Robert Baden-Powell, 1st Baron Baden-Powell: March 1903.
- Alexander Laing: September 1904.
- Sir Henry William Newton: October 1906.
- William John Sanderson: March 1909.
- Thomas Richardson: May 1909.
- Sir Andrew Noble: June 1910.
- Sir William Haswell Stephenson: October 1910.
- Thomas Burt: November 1911.
- Sir Joseph Baxter Ellis: December 1912.
- Sir Edward Grey: October 1913.
- Sir Charles Algernon Parsons: March 1914.
- Sir Joseph Swan: March 1914.
- Field Marshal Jan Smuts: October 1917.
- David Lloyd George: September 1918.
- Major General Sir Robert Arundel Kerr Montgomery: February 1919.
- Admiral of the Fleet David Beatty, 1st Earl Beatty: April 1919.
- Field Marshal Douglas Haig, 1st Earl Haig: April 1919.
- Marshal Ferdinand Foch: April 1919.
- Admiral of the Fleet Lord Jellicoe of Scapa: October 1925.
- John Henry Watson: May 1926.
- Arthur Henderson: July 1930.
- Sir George Lunn: July 1930.
- Hugh Morton: July 1930.
- Sir Arthur Munro Sutherland: May 1936.
- George Lansbury : May 1936.
- Sir Arthur Maule Oliver: June 1937.
- William Bramble: July 1939.
- Sir Charles Wothington Craven: July 1939.
- Richard Mayne: March 1940.
- David Adams: March 1940.
- John Chapman: December 1957.
- William McKeag: December 1966.
- Violet Hardisty Grantham: December 1966.
- Dame Catherine Campbell Scott: December 1966.
- Gladys Robson: December 1966.
- King Olav V of Norway: September 1968.
- President James Earl Carter Jr.: May 1977.
- Cardinal Basil Hume: January 1980.
- Professor Sir John Walton: January 1980.
- Colonel George Brown: January 1980.
- John Edward Thompson Milburn: January 1980.
- Henry Russell: January 1980.
- Arthur Grey: January 1980.
- Margaret Collins: January 1980.
- Thomas Watson Collins: January 1980.
- Daisy Dorothy Clarke: June 1982.
- David Scott Cowper: June 1982.
- Nelson Mandela: April 1986.
- Andrei Sakharov: April 1986.
- Robert Frederick Zenon Geldof: April 1986.
- Peter Taylor, Baron Taylor of Gosforth: July 1992.
- Lord Beecham: April 1995.
- Theresa Science Russell: April 1998.

=== 21st Century ===
- Harriet Jean Dunlop: February 2000.
- Dillan Richard Horsburgh: February 2000.
- Nathan Lee Douglas: February 2000.
- Lewis John White: February 2000.
- Kieran Paul Crump: February 2000.
- Jordan Rose Nicholson: February 2000.
- Rachel Isobel Somerville: February 2000.
- Nicholas Hugh Brown: December 2000.
- Edward Short, Baron Glenamara: December 2000.
- Alan Shearer: December 2000.
- Jonathan Edwards: December 2000.
- Jonathan Peter Wilkinson: December 2003.
- Sir Robert William Robson: March 2005.
- Harry Woolf, Baron Woolf: May 2006.
- Hari Shukla: May 2006.
- King Harald V of Norway: November 2008.
- Aung San Suu Kyi: March 2011. (Revoked in February 2018 by unanimous vote of the Newcastle City Council).
- Professor Peter Higgs: September 2013.
- Brendan Foster: February 2016.
- Sir Terry Farrell: February 2016.
- Sir Leonard Fenwick: May 2016.
- Olivia Grant: May 2016.
- Professor Chris Brink: September 2016.
- Michael Harrison: February 2017.
- Freddy Shepherd: April 2017.
- Bruce Shepherd: April 2017.
- Christine Hardman: 21 November 2021.
- Neil Shaka Hislop: 13 May 2022.
- Stevie Wonder: 1 March 2023.
- Eddie Howe: March 2025.

== Military Units ==
- The Royal Northumberland Fusiliers: February 1948.
- The Royal Regiment of Fusiliers: 1968.
- The Northumberland Hussars: January 1969.
- The Queen's Own Yeomanry: 1971.
- The 15th/19th The King's Royal Hussars: May 1972.
- HMS Newcastle, RN: March 1978.
- 101st (Northumbrian) Regiment Royal Artillery: January 1980.
- 201 (Northern) Field Hospital (Volunteers) RAMC: July 1984.
- The Royal Naval Reserve (Tyne Division): October 1985.
- The Royal Marines: July 1989.
- The St John Ambulance (Northumbria): July 1989.
- RAF Boulmer: February 2017.

== Organizations and Groups ==
- Citizens of Newcastle upon Tyne who volunteered and served with the British Army in the South African War: August 1901.
- Newcastle United Football Club: May 1993.
- The Royal Shakespeare Company: October 1997.
- The Sage Group plc: December 2000.
- Greggs plc: September 2009.
- The Little Sisters of the Poor: February 2017.
