= Nicolas Errington =

English soldier, military engineer and administrator

Nicolas Errington (died 1593) was an English soldier, military engineer, and administrator.

The surname was sometimes written Arrington or Aryngton, or Heryngton.

== Career ==
Errington was a Captain based in the garrison at Berwick-upon-Tweed. He was involved in military operations in Scotland.

He became Comptroller of Works at Berwick, and Muster Master, or Clerk of the Check of Musters, and was reckoned third in importance and command in Berwick.

In 1566 he delivered an inventory of the artillery and stores in the north to William Cecil. The inventory includes guns and arms at Berwick, Wark, Norham, Lindisfarne, Newcastle Castle and the Queen's Manor, Tynemouth, Alnwick, and at Carlisle Castle and the Citadel. On 10 June Queen Elizabeth appointed him Clerk of the Ordnance, which displeased John Bennett, who had a similar role. Bennet was sick in July 1568 and Errington expected him to die. He advised Cecil to have the storehouses in Bennet's control secured from his wife and others, and offered to take on Bennett's responsibilities for only two shillings more pay weekly.

He was a scout for the army raised against the Northern Rebellion from November to December 1569 and received wages of 4 shillings a day and 11 pence a day for two horsemen. On 19 December he was sent from Newcastle with letters to Regent Moray in Scotland.

== Marian Civil War ==
In Scotland there was a civil war between the followers of Mary, Queen of Scots and the supporters of her son James VI. Errington was sent several times into Scotland. Mary, Queen of Scots was informed of his activities and wrote in March 1571 about the man named "Arrington" or "Harrington" who had been sent by Elizabeth I and the Earl of Sussex to see Regent Lennox.

On 27 April 1572 Errington delivered a letter to Regent Mar for Lord Hunsdon about the rendition of the Earl of Northumberland. He described fighting on Edinburgh's Canongate, and the capture and execution of soldiers loyal to Mary, Queen of Scots, (at Cramond Bridge), who were going north to join with Adam Gordon of Auchindoun. Mary's supporters had failed to capture some strategic castles on the Forth including Barnbougle and Dundas. The Leith schoolmaster Mr Peter was deciphering captured messages. The Earl of Morton told Errington that he opposed the delivery of the Earl of Northumberland.

Edinburgh Castle was held by William Kirkcaldy of Grange for Mary, Queen of Scots. The secretary of John Knox, Richard Bannatyne wrote that Errington, who he called "Haringtoun", had also delivered messages from Queen Elizabeth to the castle, which gave the defenders some encouragement, and they received further offers by a messenger called Hope, sent from William Drury, Marshall of Berwick. English diplomacy, for a time, was content to deal with both sides.

The struggle against Kirkcaldy to take the castle became known as the "Lang Siege". An English artillery force was brought to Scotland to capture the castle from its defenders, known as "Castilians", led by William Drury. Errington was one his captains and negotiators. Before the English cannon arrived, Errington went to Edinburgh Castle on 4 March 1573 to discuss terms of surrender offered by the English ambassador, Henry Killigrew. On a second visit on 27 March he noted that the defences had been improved by earthworks and modifications to the Spur fortification. Drury sent a plan of the castle showing the new works lately seen by Errington to Cecil.

Errington was appointed Provost Marshal of the force of Scotland with command of the artillery, despite competition for the office from Thomas Sutton, who was Master of the Ordnance in Berwick. Some documents call him the "provost or undermarshal".

== Diplomacy ==
He was sent into Scotland in July 1575 to discuss the Redeswire incident with Regent Morton. The border wardens Sir John Carmichael and Sir John Forster had fought on 7 July, and Errington was sent into Scotland following the instructions of Francis Walsingham sent to the gentleman porter of Berwick, Sir John Selby of Twizell. He carried a message from the diplomat Henry Killigrew that Queen Elizabeth was displeased with the detention of Francis Russell, a son of the Earl of Bedford and Forster and his men at Dalkeith Palace. Morton claimed he entertained them guests during the crisis. After their interview, Morton released the men at held at Dalkeith the next day, except the leaders Forster and Russell.

In June 1579 he went into Scotland with Claude Nau, the secretary of Mary, Queen of Scots, sent as ambassador to her son, James VI of Scotland, instead of John Lesley, Bishop of Ross. However, the Scottish court at Stirling Castle would not allow Nau an audience, apparently because Mary's letter was addressed to James as her son, not to the "King of Scotland". Errington had no accrediting papers from Elizabeth. The Privy Council of Scotland issued a proclamation that Nau deserved punishment and should be commanded to depart.

Errington spoke to James VI in September and October 1579 at Stirling Castle and Holyrood Palace. He discussed the exile of Claud Hamilton in England. Errington also wrote to Francis Walsingham reporting that factions in Scotland were discussing various marriages for the king. He noted the popularity of the newly-arrived Esmé Stewart.

In November 1579 Errington was sent again to James VI, who was now officially the adult ruler of Scotland at age 14, to discuss the progress of border matters since 1572, the "Pacification of Perth", and retrospective justice or revocations especially concerning the Hamilton family. He also brought a letter from Queen Elizabeth to Morton on the subject of Claud Hamilton. Erring discussed the future marriage of James VI with the Earl and Countess of Argyll.

He was in Stirling in April 1580 to attend a Convention of Estates, which was postponed. He spoke to King James and his tutor Peter Young. There were rumours of a palace coup and Esmé Stewart and his followers barricaded themselves in his rooms in the castle.

== Errington and the "Association" ==
Errington was involved in negotiations around the "Association", a scheme embraced by Mary, Queen of scots, in which she would return to joint rule with her son James. In October 1581, Errington went to Scotland to make the point that a ramification of her current plan would imply that James's loyal supporters had been traitors to Mary. He was refused entry to Scotland in November 1581 while acting as an envoy from Mary, Queen of Scots. Her advisers encouraged her to complain to James VI.

== Death ==
Errington made a will on 1 July 1593. He died on 8 December 1593.

John Crane, surveyor of Berwick, or William Selby, gentleman porter, were discussed as his replacement. Robert Bowyer became Comptroller. Crane was still Muster Master in December 1603.
