= John Blackett =

John Blackett may refer to:

- John Blackett (politician) (1821–1856), British politician during the 1850s
- John Erasmus Blackett (1729–1814), Newcastle upon Tyne businessman and Mayor of Newcastle
- John Blackett (engineer) (1818–1893), British-born New Zealand engineer
