= Sir William Blackett, 1st Baronet, of Newcastle =

Merchant, industrialist, politician and member of Newcastle coal trade monopoly

Sir William Blackett, 1st Baronet (May 1621 – 16 May 1680) was a businessman who founded a mercantile and industrial base in Newcastle and a politician who sat in the House of Commons from 1673 to 1680.

== Early life ==
Blackett was the third son of William Blackett and his wife Isabella Crook and was born in Gateshead. His father, was a successful businessman at Jarrow and Gateshead and retired to Hoppyland, County Durham. Blackett was apprenticed to a merchant at Newcastle in 1636 and became merchant trading with Denmark. The following story about him was printed in the Newcastle Daily Journal of 18 April 1893.

Sir William, soon after he commenced business risked his little all in a speculation in flax, and having freighted a large vessel with that article received the unpleasant intelligence that the flax fleet had been dispersed in a storm, and most of the vessels either lost or captured by the enemy. He took his accustomed walk next morning, ruminating on his loss, and was aroused by the noise of a ship in the river. He jumped upon an adjoining hedge, hailed the vessel and found it to be his own, which had without difficulty weathered the storm. He instantly returned and hiring a horse rode in a very short time to London and hastened to the exchange, found the merchants in great alarm about the loss of the flax fleet and speaking of the consequent high price of flax. On informing them that he dealt in that article and had a large quantity to dispose of, speculators soon flocked around him and he sold his whole cargo at a most extravagant price, and the produce of that adventure laid the foundation for one of the largest fortunes acquired in Newcastle. Sir William (and also his children) is said to have regarded with a kind of veneration the hedge from which he first perceived the vessel and made it the extent of his future morning walks.

== Business and political career ==
Blackett was a member of Merchant Adventurers at Newcastle in 1645 and became freeman in 1646. He became a common councilman of Newcastle in 1648. In 1653 he was a member of the Eastland Company and the Hostmen of Newcastle-upon-Tyne. He played no apparent part in the English Civil War or interregnum politics until the time of the Restoration.

Blackett was commissioner for militia in March 1660 and captain of foot militia in April 1660. From August 1660 to 1661 he was commissioner for assessment for Newcastle. He was elected sheriff of Newcastle for 1660 to 1661, when he was described as "a loyal man, much beloved and fit for the office". From 1661 until his death he was an alderman of Newcastle. He was governor of the Hostmen's Company from 1662 to 1664 and was Mayor of Newcastle for 1666–67 during which year of office he appeased a riot over taxes with an assurance that payment was voluntary. He was governor of the Hostmen's Company again from 1667 to 1669 and was a commissioner for assessment for Newcastle from 1667 until his death.

Blackett was also involved in coal and lead mining, having "by the product of his mines and collieries acquired a very great fortune". He invested heavily in the local coalfield, and once spent £20,000 in an unsuccessful attempt to drain a flooded pit. He is believed to have extended his fortune by buying land in the 1660s and 1670s. He also acted as business adviser to Charles Howard, 1st Earl of Carlisle. From 1669 until his death, he was sub-farmer of coal duties. He became Deputy Lieutenant of the county in 1670. In 1672, he was involved in a dispute with the local customs officials as member of the syndicate which leased the coal export duties from Lord Townshend for £3,200 a year. He was J.P. for Northumberland from 1673 until his death.

In 1673, Blackett was elected in a by-election as Member of Parliament for Newcastle-upon-Tyne in the Cavalier Parliament. He was created a baronet nine days later on 12 December 1673 and the fee was remitted "in consideration of his good services". He was commissioner for assessment for county Durham and Northumberland from 1677 until his death and commissioner for carriage of coals for the port of Newcastle in 1679. He retained his seat at Newcastle in the two elections of 1679.

Blackett died aged about 61 and was buried at St Nicholas Church, Newcastle.

== Family ==
Blackett married firstly, on 10 July 1645 at Hamsterley. Elizabeth Kirkley, daughter of Michael Kirkley merchant of Newcastle. She died on 7 April 1674 and was buried at St Nicholas Church Newcastle. He married secondly Margaret Rogers, widow of Captain John Rogers and daughter of Henry Cock of Newcastle. He was succeeded as baronet by his son by his first wife Edward to whom he left a substantial fortune. He also left a fortune to his third son William who acquired the Wallington estate.

Parliament of England
Preceded by Sir Francis Anderson; Sir John Marlay	Member of Parliament for Newcastle-upon-Tyne; 1673 – 1680; With: Sir Francis Anderson 1673–1679; Sir Ralph Carr 1679–1680	Succeeded by Sir Ralph Carr; Sir Nathaniel Johnson
Baronetage of England
New creation	Baronet (of Matfen); 1673–1680	Succeeded by Edward Blackett
