= Lionel Maddison =

Mayor of Newcastle

Lionel Maddison (1537–1624) was an English collier and Mayor of Newcastle upon Tyne.

== Life ==
A son of Rowland Maddison of Unthank Hall, Maddison was Sheriff of Newcastle in 1584 and 1585 and Mayor of Newcastle from 1593 to 1594, in 1605, and from 1617 to 1618.

He organised celebrations for the 35th anniversary of the accession of Queen Elizabeth I, involving musicians, cannon salutes or musket volleys, and a banquet.

On 29 May 1594 he wrote to Robert Cecil about the capture of the goldsmith Jacob Kroger who had stolen jewels belonging to the Scottish queen Anne of Denmark, and the movements of the Scottish rebel Francis Stewart, 5th Earl of Bothwell.

In September 1594 he organised a banquet and civic entertainments for Walraven III van Brederode and Jacob Valke who had travelled from Stirling. They had been ambassadors at the baptism of Prince Henry. In Newcastle they were treated to a banquet including baked rabbit, fish, and swan, a barrel of London beer, and sugar confectionaries, to the accompaniment of music by the town waits.

Maddison was a coal entrepreneur with a pit at Marshall Lands. In 1622 an income from the duty on coal had been granted to Lucy Russell, Countess of Bedford, and Maddison testified on the constitution of the town and duties paid on coal.

James VI and I made a return visit to Scotland in 1617. Madison met him at Sandhill on 23 April and presented him with a gold bowl filled with gold coins. The king lodged at George Selby's house in Newcastle, and Selby was afterwards known as "The King's Host". The king visited Heaton Hall. On 4 May Lionel Madison hosted a banquet.

Lionel Maddison died on 6 December 1624 and was buried in St Nicholas' church.

== Marriage and family ==
Lionel Maddison married Jane Seymour, who died on 9 July 1611. Their children included:

- Henry Maddison (1574-1634), also Mayor of Newcastle, who married Elizabeth Barker (d. 1653). Their children were:
  - Lionel Maddison, also Mayor of Newcastle, who was knighted by Charles I in 1633.
  - Ralph, Robert, William, Henry, Peter, George, Timothy, Thomas, John (who died at Cadiz), Jane, Susan, Elizabeth, Barbara, Eleanor, Jane.

Lionel Maddison junior may have commissioned the family monument in Newcastle Cathedral. The age of his grandfather at death given on the monument "94" differs from depositions given by Lionel Maddison himself.
