= Dethick (disambiguation) =

Dethick is part of a parish in Derbyshire, England referred to as Dethick, Lea and Holloway.

Dethick may also refer to:

- Dethick Manor, a 16th-century manor house in Dethick, Amber Valley, Derbyshire

== People with the surname ==
- Gilbert Dethick (c. 1510–1584), long-serving officer of arms
- Humphrey Dethick (fl. 1602), cloth merchant and intriguer.
- John Dethick, (died 1671), Lord Mayor of London
- Robert Dethick, MP for Derbyshire (UK Parliament constituency)
- William Dethick (c. 1542–1612), long-serving officer of arms
- William Dethick (died 1408/1410), MP for Derbyshire (UK Parliament constituency)
