= Northumberland Street =

Street in Newcastle upon Tyne, England

Coordinates: 54°58′33″N 1°36′46″W

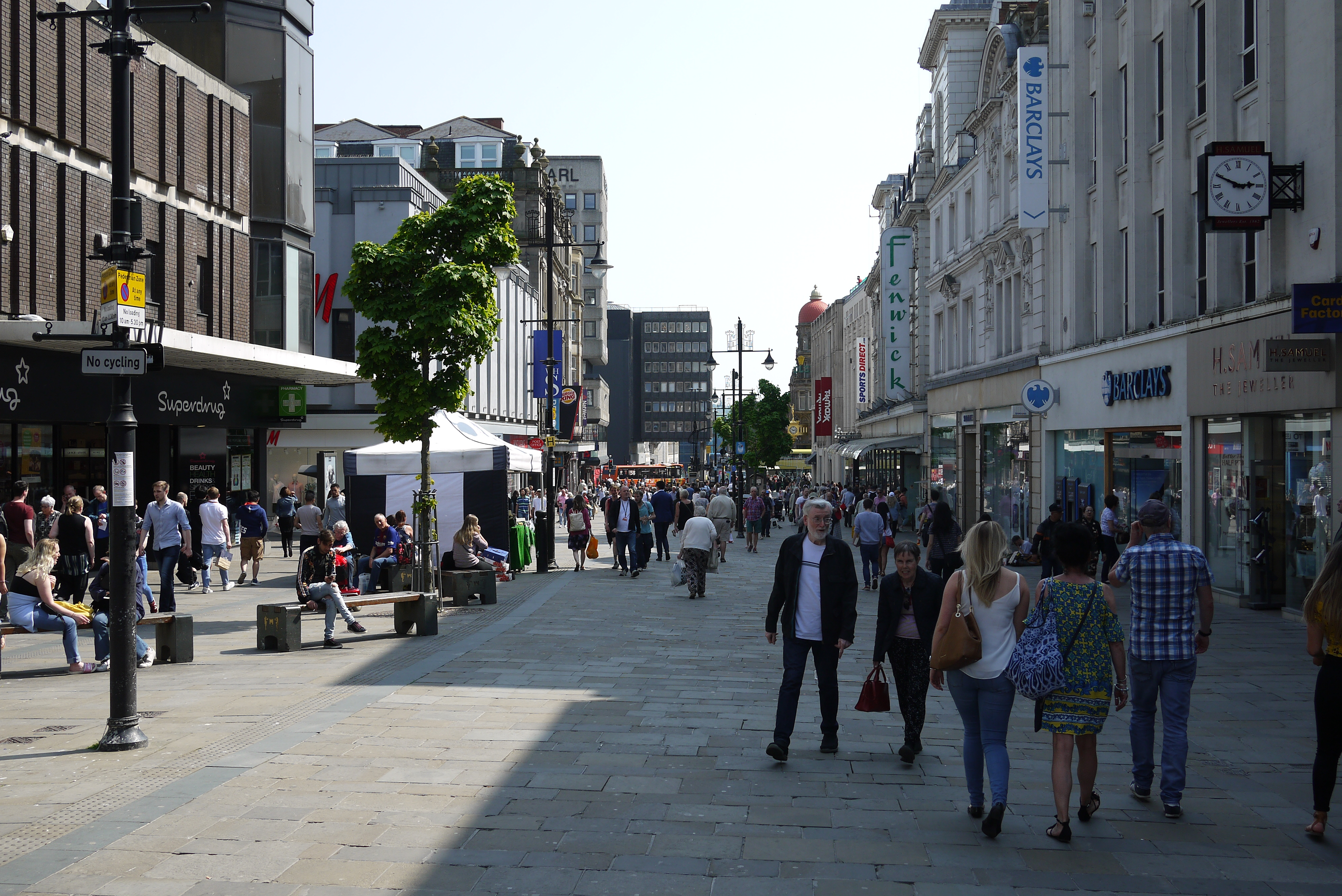
- Northumberland Street in 2018
- Interactive map of Northumberland Street
- Length: 400 m (1,300 ft)
- Location: Newcastle upon Tyne
- Quarter: Grainger Town
- Nearest metro station: Haymarket (North), Monument (South)
- North: St. Mary's Place
- South: Blackett Street, New Bridge Street, Pilgrim Street

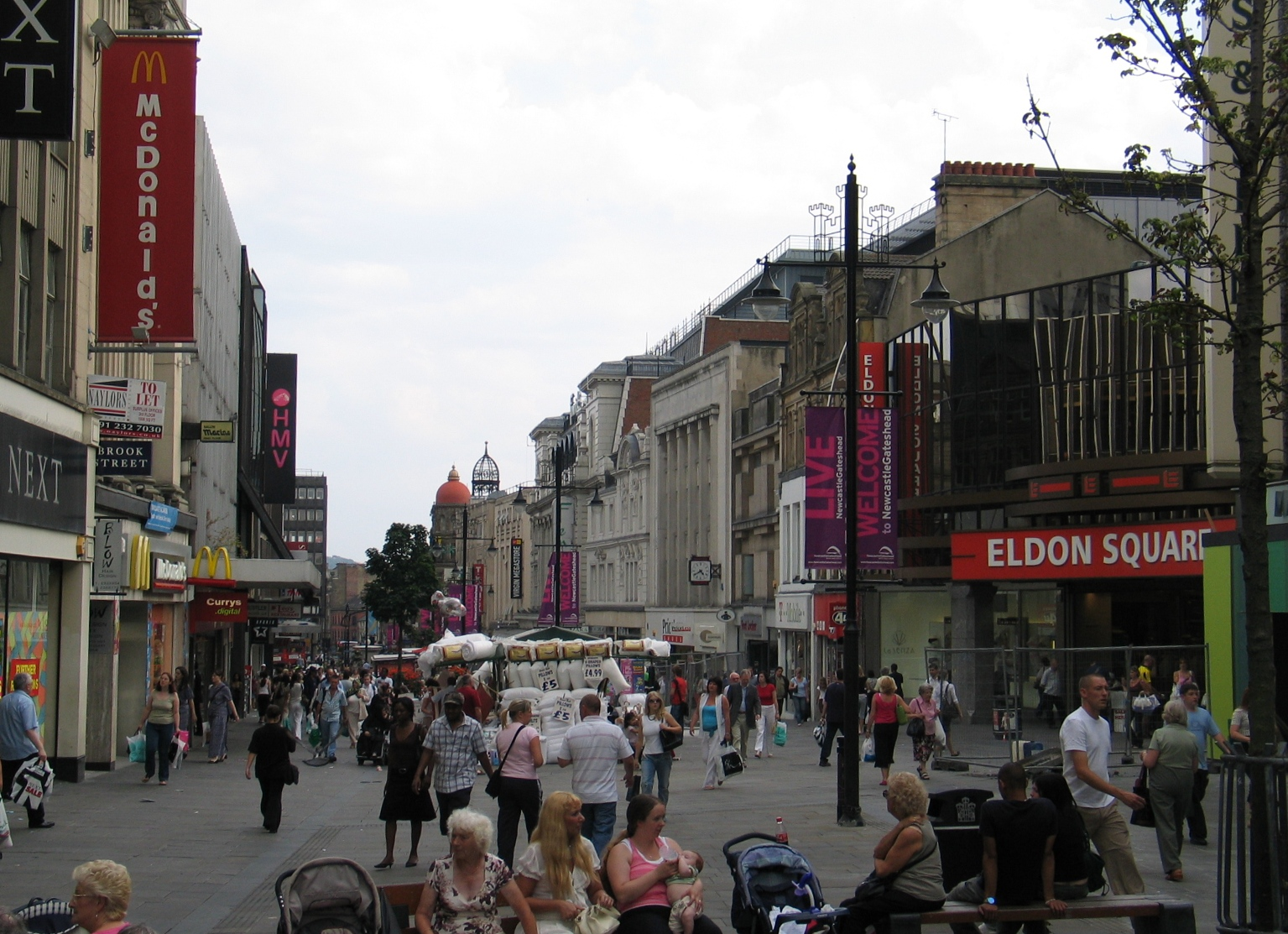
Northumberland Street, in July 2006

Northumberland Street is a major shopping street in the city of Newcastle upon Tyne, in the North East of England. It is home to a wide range of different retailers, banks and cafes. As of 2004, Northumberland Street was the most expensive location in the UK outside London to own a shop, in terms of rental per square foot. However, by 2016, it had been overtaken by Manchester's Market Square, Leeds' Commercial Road, Edinburgh's Princes Street, and Glasgow's Buchanan Street. There are currently over 51 retailers including pubs on Newcastle's Northumberland Street.

== Location ==
The street runs from the Haymarket Interchange Metro station and The Newcastle Civic Centre in the north, towards Pilgrim Street and the Monument Metro station at the south. It encompasses the entrance to the Eldon Square Shopping Centre. It also houses the entrance to the Monument Mall Shopping Centre.

South of Blackett Street, Northumberland Street ends at the junction with Pilgrim Street which runs to the Tyne Bridge. From the opening of the bridge in 1928 until the opening of the Tyne Tunnel in 1967, Northumberland Street was part of the A1 between London and Edinburgh. It is now pedestrianised.

Until 1999, the most northerly section of Northumberland Street from Northumberland Road onwards was still open to traffic and a busy bus route, which led to the shops in this part of the street being much less popular than those farther south. This section is now pedestrianised in keeping with the remainder of the street. However, some electronic maps still show this part as an accessible road.

Delivery traffic is still permitted to drive up Northumberland Street in the early morning to complete deliveries, but, after that, all non-pedestrian traffic is banned, including bicycles and skateboards.

== Listed building ==
Number 45, formerly Boots the Chemist, is a Grade II listed building built around 1900 with a facade that includes life-size figures of Sir John Marley, Roger Thornton, Thomas Bewick and Harry Hotspur.
