= William Carr (Newcastle-upon-Tyne MP, died 1742) =

English politician

William Carr II, FRS (died 16 May 1742) of Newcastle-upon-Tyne was an English Whig politician who sat in the House of Commons between 1722 and 1734.

Carr was the son of merchant Joseph Carr of Newcastle. He himself became a merchant and was admitted to the Newcastle companies of *Merchant Adventurers in December 1721 and Hostmen in March 1722. He was elected a Fellow of the Royal Society in 1727.

Carr was returned as a Whig Member of Parliament (MP) for Newcastle-upon-Tyne at the 1722 British general election. In 1724, he was elected Mayor of Newcastle. He was defeated at the 1727 British general election but was returned on petition on 26 March 1729. At the 1734 British general election he was defeated heavily. He was elected Mayor of Newcastle for 1737 but was defeated again at the 1741 British general election.

Carr died on 16 May 1742.

Parliament of Great Britain
Preceded by Sir William Blackett, Bt; William Wrightson	Member of Parliament for Newcastle-upon-Tyne; 1722–1727; With: Sir William Blackett, Bt	Succeeded by Sir William Blackett, Bt; Nicholas Fenwick
Preceded by Sir William Blackett, Bt; Nicholas Fenwick	Member of Parliament for Newcastle-upon-Tyne; 1729–134; With: Nicholas Fenwick	Succeeded by Sir Walter Calverley-Blackett, Bt; Nicholas Fenwick
