= List of mayors of Newcastle upon Tyne =

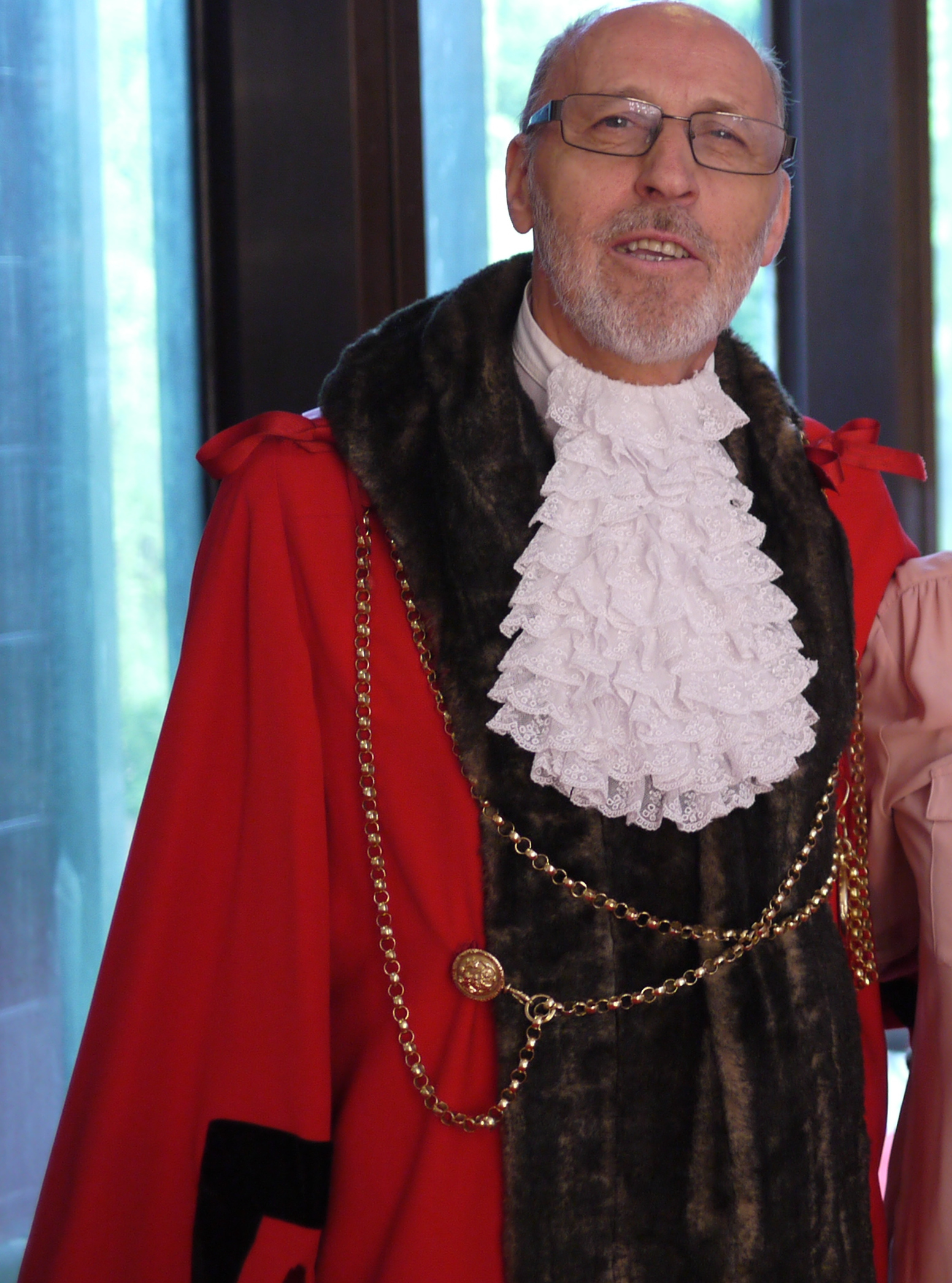
David Down, Lord Mayor of Newcastle upon Tyne 2018–19

This is a list of mayors and the later lord mayors of the city of Newcastle-upon-Tyne in the United Kingdom.

Newcastle had elected a mayor annually since 1216. The city was awarded the dignity of a lord mayoralty by letters patent dated 27 July 1906. The grant was announced by Edward VII on a visit to the city on 12 July, having been approved by the Home Office as Newcastle was "the chief town and seaport of the North of England". When the city became a metropolitan borough in 1974 the honour was confirmed by letters patent dated 1 April 1974.

The office of Sheriff of Newcastle upon Tyne existed from 1400 to 1974 and was reintroduced in 1996 as a position held by the Deputy Lord Mayor.

== Key ==
| Symbol | Meaning |
|---|---|
| (d) | Died in office |

== Mayors and Lord Mayors of Newcastle ==
Source: Newcastle City Council

| Year(s) elected | Name | Notes |
|---|---|---|
| 1216 | Daniel, son of Nicholas | |
| 1230–33 | John, son of the Dean | |
| 1245–51 | Peter Scot | |
| 1252–58 | Henry of Carliol | |
| 1258–59 | Thomas of Carliol | |
| 1259 | Nicholas Scot | |
| 1260 | Thomas of Carliol | |
| 1260–63 | Henry of Carliol | |
| 1264–65 | Thomas of Carliol | |
| 1271 | John, son of Roger | |
| 1272 | Thomas of Carliol | |
| 1273 | Nicholas Scot | |
| 1274 | Henry Scot | |
| 1275–76 | John, son of Roger | |
| 1277 | Henry Scot | |
| 1278 | Thomas of Carliol | |
| 1279–80 | John, son of Roger | |
| 1281 | Robert of Mitford | |
| 1282–85 | Henry Scot | |
| 1286–87 | John son of Roger | |
| 1288–89 | Henry Scot | |
| 1290 | John Scot | |
| 1291–92 | Hugh of Carliol | |
| 1293 | Henry Scot | |
| 1294 | Hugh of Carliol | |
| 1295–97 | John Scot | |
| 1298–99 | Henry Scot | |
| 1300–02 | Peter Graper | |
| 1303–04 | Nicholas of Carliol | |
| 1305–08 | Richard of Emeldon | |
| 1309 | Nicholas of Carliol | |
| 1310 | Sir Nicholas Scot | |
| 1311–12 | Richard of Emeldon | |
| 1313 | Thomas of Carliol | |
| 1314–20 | Richard of Emeldon | |
| 1321 | Sir Nicholas Scot | |
| 1322–29 | Richard of Emeldon | |
| 1330 | William of Burneton | |
| 1331–32 | Richard of Emeldon | |
| 1333 | John of Denton | Murdered by burgesses, 1344 |
| 1334 | Richard of Acton | |
| 1335 | Hugh of Hecham | |
| 1336–37 | John of Denton | Murdered by burgesses, 1344 |
| 1338 | Robert of Shilvington | |
| 1339 | Walran of Lumley | |
| 1340 | John of Denton | Murdered by burgesses, 1344 |
| 1341 | Robert of Shilvington | |
| 1342 | Robert of Haliwell | |
| 1343–44 | Richard of Galeway | |
| 1345 | Robert of Shilvington | |
| 1346–47 | Peter Graper | |
| 1348–49 | Robert of Angerton | |
| 1350–51 | Gilbert of Duxfield | |
| 1352 | Peter Graper | |
| 1353–60 | William Del Strother | |
| 1361–62 | John De La Chambre | |
| 1363–64 | Robert of Angerton | |
| 1364 | Richard of Stanhope | |
| 1365 | Sir William of Acton | |
| 1366 | John of Stanhope | |
| 1367–68 | Sir William of Acton | |
| 1369–70 | Robert of Angerton | |
| 1371 | John De La Chambre | |
| 1372 | Sir William of Acton | |
| 1373 | John of Bulkham | |
| 1374 | John of Refham | |
| 1375–76 | John of Bulkham | |
| 1377–78 | Richard of Stanhope | |
| 1379–81 | William of Bishopdale | MP for Newcastle-upon-Tyne 1378, 1381, 1388, 1390 and 1391 |
| 1382 | Robert Oliver | |
| 1383 | John of Bulkham | |
| 1384 | Stephen Whitgray | |
| 1385 | Adam of Bulkham | |
| 1386 | Robert Plummer | |
| 1387 | John of Bulkham | |
| 1388 | Robert of Raynton | |
| 1389 | John of Horton | |
| 1390–92 | William of Bishopdale | MP for Newcastle-upon-Tyne 1378, 1381, 1388, 1390 and 1391 |
| 1393–95 | Laurence Acton | MP for Newcastle upon Tyne in 1386, 1391, September 1397, and 1399 |
| 1396–97 | Sampson Harding | |
| 1398 | William Johnson | |
| 1399–1400 | Henry Karlell | Merchant. MP for Newcastle-upon-Tyne, 1388,1394 MP for Newcastle-upon-Tyne 1378, 1381, 1388, 1390 and 1391 |
| 1400 | Roger Thornton | MP for Newcastle-upon-Tyne 1399, 1411, 1417 and 1419 |
| 1401 | Robert Cherden | |
| 1402–05 | Roger Thornton | MP for Newcastle-upon-Tyne 1399, 1411, 1417 and 1419 |
| 1406 | Robert Gabefore | |
| 1407 | William Esyngton | |
| 1408–09 | William Langton | |
| 1410 | | |
| 1411–12 | William Langton | |
| 1413–15 | Robert Hebburn (d) | |
| 1416–17 | Roger Thornton | MP for Newcastle-upon-Tyne, 1399,1411,1417 and 1419 |
| 1418–19 | John Strother | MP for Newcastle-upon-Tyne 1417, 1419 and 1421 |
| 1420 | John Bywell | |
| 1421 | John Strother | MP for Newcastle-upon-Tyne 1417, 1419 and 1421 |
| 1422 | John Wall | Merchant. MP for Newcastle-upon-Tyne, 1420 |
| 1423–25 | Roger Thornton | MP for Newcastle-upon-Tyne, 1399,1411,1417 and 1419 |
| 1426 | William Ellerby | |
| 1427 | John Wall | |
| 1428 | Laurence Acton | |
| 1429 | John Rodes | |
| 1430 | John Rodes | |
| 1431 | John Rodes | |
| 1432 | Laurence Acton | |
| 1433 | Laurence Acton | |
| 1434 | Richard Hall | |
| 1435 | Robert Whelpington | |
| 1436 | Richard Hall | |
| 1437 | Laurence Acton | |
| 1438 | Robert Whelpington | |
| 1439 | John Clark | |
| 1440 | John Chambers | |
| 1441 | William Harding | |
| 1442 | Thomas Warde | |
| 1443 | John Musgrave | |
| 1444 | William Harding | |
| 1445 | William Jay | |
| 1446 | William Harding | |
| 1447 | William Harding | |
| 1448 | John Ward | |
| 1449 | William Harding | |
| 1450 | John Ward | |
| 1451 | Robert Baxter | |
| 1452 | William Harding | |
| 1453 | John Carlell | |
| 1454 | John Richardson | |
| 1455 | John Richardson | |
| 1456 | John Richardson | |
| 1457 | John Richardson | |
| 1458 | John Pendreth | |
| 1459 | John Richardson | |
| 1460 | Robert Baxter | |
| 1461 | John Richardson | |
| 1462 | Allen Bird | |
| 1463 | Allen Bird | |
| 1464 | John Nixon | |
| 1465 | Allen Bird | |
| 1466 | John Nixon | |
| 1467 | William Blaxton | |
| 1468 | John Nixon | |
| 1469 | Richard Stevenson | |
| 1470 | William Blaxton | |
| 1471 | John Nixon | |
| 1472 | William Blaxton | |
| 1473 | William Blaxton | |
| 1474 | Nicholas Haynyng | |
| 1475 | John Carlell | |
| 1476 | John Carlell | |
| 1477 | John Coke | |
| 1478 | Robert Chambers | |
| 1479 | John Sample | |
| 1480 | John Carlell | |
| 1481 | George Carr | |
| 1482 | John Coke | |
| 1483 | John Carlell | |
| 1484 | George Carr | |
| 1485 | Richard Chamber | |
| 1486 | George Carr | |
| 1487 | George Carr | |
| 1488 | Thomas Lockwood | |
| 1489 | George Carr | |
| 1490 | Peter Bewick | |
| 1491 | George Carr | |
| 1492 | George Carr | |
| 1493 | George Carr | |
| 1494 | George Bird | |
| 1495 | George Bird | |
| 1496 | George Bird | |
| 1497 | Robert Harding | |
| 1498 | George Carr | |
| 1499 | Robert Brigham | |
| 1500 | George Carr | |
| 1501 | Bertram Younghusband | |
| 1502 | George Carr | |
| 1503 | John Snowe | |
| 1504 | Christopher Brigham | |
| 1505 | Christopher Brigham | |
| 1506 | George Bird | |
| 1507 | Bertram Younghusband | |
| 1508 | Robert Baxter | |
| 1509 | John Brandling | |
| 1510 | Thomas Riddell | |
| 1511 | George Bird (d) | |
| 1511 | Christopher Brigham | |
| 1512 | John Brandling | |
| 1513 | John Blaxton | |
| 1514 | Thomas Horsley | Founder of Royal Grammar School, Newcastle |
| 1515 | Roger Dent | |
| 1516 | John Brandling | |
| 1517 | Edward Baxter | |
| 1518 | Edward Baxter | |
| 1519 | Thomas Horsley | Founder of Royal Grammar School, Newcastle |
| 1520 | John Brandling | |
| 1521 | Thomas Riddell | |
| 1522 | Edward Baxter | |
| 1523 | Edward Baxter | |
| 1524–25 | Thomas Horsley | Founder of Royal Grammar School, Newcastle |
| 1526 | Thomas Riddell | |
| 1527 | John Blaxton | |
| 1528 | Edward Swinburn | |
| 1529 | James Lawson | |
| 1530 | Gilbert Middleton | |
| 1531 | Robert Brandling | MP for Newcastle-upon-Tyne, 1545,1547,1553,1555 and 1563 |
| 1532 | Henry Anderson | MP for Newcastle-upon-Tyne, 1529 |
| 1533 | Thomas Horsley | Founder of Royal Grammar School, Newcastle |
| 1534 | Ralph Carr | |
| 1535 | Thomas Baxter | |
| 1536 | Robert Brandling | MP for Newcastle-upon-Tyne, 1545,1547,1553,1555 and 1563 |
| 1537 | John Sanderson | |
| 1538 | Andrew Bewick | |
| 1539 | Henry Anderson | MP for Newcastle-upon-Tyne, 1529 |
| 1540 | James Lawson | |
| 1541 | John Hilton | |
| 1542 | Henry Anderson | MP for Newcastle-upon-Tyne, 1529 |
| 1543 | Robert Brandling | MP for Newcastle-upon-Tyne, 1545,1547,1553,1555 and 1563 |
| 1544 | Robert Lewen | |
| 1545 | George Davell | |
| 1546 | Henry Anderson | MP for Newcastle-upon-Tyne, 1529 |
| 1547 | Sir Robert Brandling | MP for Newcastle-upon-Tyne, 1545, 1547, 1553, 1555 and 1563 |
| 1548 | Mark Shafto | |
| 1549 | Cuthbert Ellison | |
| 1550 | Robert Brigham | |
| 1551 | Bertram Anderson | MP for Newcastle-upon-Tyne 1553, 1554, 1554, 1558 and 1563 |
| 1552 | Robert Lewen | |
| 1553 | Cuthbert Blunt | |
| 1554 | Cuthbert Ellison | |
| 1555 | Richard Hodgson | |
| 1556 | Christopher Mitford | |
| 1557 | Bertram Anderson | MP for Newcastle-upon-Tyne 1553, 1554, 1554, 1558 and 1563 |
| 1558 | Oswald Chapman | |
| 1559 | Robert Ellison | |
| 1560 | Cuthbert Musgrave | |
| 1561 | John Wilkinson | |
| 1562 | William Dent | |
| 1563 | Bertram Anderson | MP for Newcastle-upon-Tyne 1553, 1554, 1554, 1558 and 1563 |
| 1564 | Sir Robert Brandling | MP for Newcastle-upon-Tyne, 1545, 1547, 1553, 1555 and 1563 |
| 1565 | William Carr | |
| 1566 | Richard Hodgson | |
| 1567 | Robert Anderson | |
| 1568 | Henry Brandling | |
| 1569 | Christopher Mitford | |
| 1570 | Robert Ellison | |
| 1571 | William Jenison | MP for Newcastle-upon-Tyne, 1571, 1572 and 1584 |
| 1572 | Thomas Liddell | Merchant, Sheriff of Newcastle in 1563-64. Father of Thomas Liddell, Mayor 1597-98 and 1609-10. |
| 1573 | William Selby | |
| 1574 | John Watson | |
| 1575 | Henry Anderson | MP for Newcastle-upon-Tyne 1584, 1586, 1588 and 1593 |
| 1576 | Henry Brandling | |
| 1577 | Robert Barker | |
| 1578 | Mark Shafto | |
| 1579 | Roger Rawe | |
| 1580 | Richard Hodgson | |
| 1581 | William Jenison | MP for Newcastle-upon-Tyne, 1571, 1572 and 1584 |
| 1582 | William Riddell | |
| 1583 | Henry Anderson | MP for Newcastle-upon-Tyne 1584, 1586, 1588 and 1593 |
| 1584 | Henry Mitford | |
| 1585 | Robert Barker | |
| 1586 | Henry Chapman | |
| 1587 | Edward Lewe | |
| 1588 | Roger Nicholson | |
| 1589 | William Selby | |
| 1590 | Robert Atkinson | |
| 1591 | George Farnaby | |
| 1592 | Roger Rawe | |
| 1593 | Lionel Maddison | |
| 1594 | Henry Anderson | MP for Newcastle-upon-Tyne 1584, 1586, 1588 and 1593 |
| 1595 | William Riddell | |
| 1596 | Ralph Jenison (d) | |
| 1596 | Henry Chapman | |
| 1597 | Thomas Liddell | Merchant, Sheriff of Newcastle 1592-93. Son of Thomas Liddell (d.1577), Mayor 1572-73. Father of Sir Thomas Liddell, 1st Baronet, Mayor 1625, 1634, and 1636. |
| 1598 | George Farnaby | |
| 1599 | William Jenison | MP for Newcastle-upon-Tyne, 1601 and 1614 |
| 1600 | George Selby | |
| 1601 | Francis Anderson | Grandfather of Sir Francis Anderson |
| 1602 | Robert Dudley | |
| 1603 | William Warmouth | |
| 1604 | Thomas Riddel | |
| 1605 | Lionel Maddison | |
| 1606 | George Selby | |
| 1607 | James Clavering | |
| 1608 | Henry Chapman | |
| 1609 | Thomas Liddell | Merchant, Sheriff of Newcastle 1592-93. Son of Thomas Liddell (d.1577), Mayor 1572-73, and father of Sir Thomas Liddell, 1st Baronet.. |
| 1610 | William Jenison | MP for Newcastle-upon-Tyne, 1601 and 1614 |
| 1611 | George Selby | MP for Newcastle-upon-Tyne, 1601-14 |
| 1612 | Francis Anderson | Grandfather of Sir Francis Anderson |
| 1613 | Sir Henry Anderson | MP for Newcastle-upon-Tyne, 1614–1628 |
| 1614 | William Warmouth | |
| 1615 | Francis Burrell | |
| 1616 | Sir Thomas Riddell | |
| 1617 | Lionel Maddison | |
| 1618 | James Clavering | |
| 1619 | Sir Peter Riddell | MP for Newcastle-upon-Tyne, 1624-29 |
| 1620 | Henry Chapman | |
| 1621 | William Jenison | MP for Newcastle-upon-Tyne, 1601 and 1614 |
| 1622 | George Selby | |
| 1623 | Henry Bowes | |
| 1624 | William Hall | |
| 1625 | Thomas Liddell | |
| 1626 | Alexander Davison | |
| 1627 | Henry Chapman | |
| 1628 | Robert Bewick | |
| 1629 | John Clavering | |
| 1630 | Robert Anderson | |
| 1631 | William Warmouth | |
| 1632 | Sir Lionel Maddison | |
| 1633 | Ralph Cole | |
| 1634 | Ralph Cock | |
| 1635 | Sir Peter Riddell | |
| 1636 | Thomas Liddell | |
| 1637 | John Marlay | MP for Newcastle-upon-Tyne, 1661-1673 |
| 1638 | Alexander Davison | |
| 1639 | Robert Bewick | |
| 1640 | Sir Nicholas Cole, 1st Baronet | |
| 1641 | Sir Nicholas Cole, 1st Baronet | |
| 1642–44 | Sir John Marley | |
| 1644 | Henry Warmouth | |
| 1645 | John Blaxton | |
| 1646 | Henry Dawson | |
| 1647 | Thomas Ledger | |
| 1648 | Thomas Bonner | |
| 1649 | William Dawson | |
| 1650 | George Dawson | |
| 1651 | Thomas Bonner | |
| 1652 | Henry Dawson (d) | |
| 1652 | George Dawson | |
| 1653 | William Johnson | |
| 1654 | William Johnson | |
| 1655 | Robert Shaftoe | |
| 1656 | Henry Rawling | |
| 1657 | George Dawson | |
| 1658 | Mark Milbank | |
| 1659 | Thomas Bonner | |
| 1660 | John Emmerson | |
| 1661 | Sir John Marley | |
| 1662 | Sir Francis Anderson | MP for Newcastle-upon-Tyne, 1660–1679 |
| 1663 | Sir James Clavering | MP for Durham, 1656-58 |
| 1664 | Sir Francis Liddel | Son of Sir Thomas Liddell, 1st Baronet who had been Mayor in 1626-27 and 1636-37. Sir Francis had served as Sheriff of Newcastle in 1640. |
| 1665 | Henry Maddison | |
| 1666 | William Blackett | Businessman. MP for Newcastle-upon-Tyne, 1673 and 1679 |
| 1667 | Henry Brabant | |
| 1668 | Ralph Jennison | |
| 1669 | Thomas Davison | |
| 1670 | William Carr | |
| 1671 | Ralph Grey | |
| 1672 | Mark Milbank | |
| 1673 | Timothy Davison | |
| 1674 | Thomas Jennison | |
| 1675 | Sir Francis Anderson | MP for Newcastle-upon-Tyne, 1660–1679 |
| 1676 | Sir Ralph Carr | MP for Newcastle-upon-Tyne, 1679, 1881, 1689 and 1690 |
| 1677 | Robert Roddam | |
| 1678 | Matthew Jeffryson | |
| 1679 | George Morton | |
| 1680 | Sir Nathaniel Johnson | |
| 1681 | Timothy Robson | |
| 1682 | Nicholas Fenwick | |
| 1683 | William Blackett | |
| 1684 | William Aubone | |
| 1685 | Sir Henry Brabant | |
| 1686 | Nicholas Cole | |
| 1687 | John Squire (r) | |
| 1687 | Sir William Creagh | |
| 1688 | William Hutchinson (r) | |
| 1688 | Nicholas Ridley | |
| 1689 | William Carr | MP for Newcastle-upon-Tyne, 1690–1710 |
| 1690 | William Ramsey | |
| 1691 | Matthew White | |
| 1692 | Thomas Wasse | |
| 1693 | Sir Ralph Carr | |
| 1694 | Joseph Atkinson | |
| 1695 | Timothy Robson | |
| 1696 | George Whinfield | |
| 1697 | Nicholas Fenwick | |
| 1698 | Sir William Blackett | |
| 1699 | Robert Eden | |
| 1700 | George Henderson | |
| 1701 | William Ramsey | |
| 1702 | William Carr | MP for Newcastle-upon-Tyne, 1690–1710 |
| 1703 | Matthew White | |
| 1704 | Thomas Wasse | |
| 1705 | Sir Ralph Carr | |
| 1706 | Nicholas Ridley | |
| 1707 | Joseph Atkinson | |
| 1708 | Robert Fenwick | |
| 1709 | George Whinfield (d) | |
| 1709 | Jonathan Rodham | |
| 1710 | William Ellison | |
| 1711 | Matthew Fetherstonhaugh | |
| 1712 | Henry Reay | |
| 1713 | Richard Ridley | |
| 1714 | Edward Johnson | |
| 1715 | Henry Dalston | |
| 1716 | Ralph Reed | |
| 1717 | Francis Rudstone | |
| 1718 | Sir William Blackett | MP for Newcastle-upon-Tyne, 1710–28 |
| 1719 | Joseph Green | |
| 1720 | Nicholas Fenwick | |
| 1721 | Francis Johnson | |
| 1722 | William Ellison | |
| 1723 | Matthew Fetherstonhaugh | |
| 1724 | William Carr | MP for Newcastle-upon-Tyne, 1722–27, 1729–34 |
| 1725 | Nathaniel Clayton | |
| 1726 | Nicholas Fenwick | MP for Newcastle-upon-Tyne, 1727-47 |
| 1727 | Cuthbert Fenwick | |
| 1728 | Stephen Coulson | |
| 1729 | Henry Reay | |
| 1730 | Francis Rudston | |
| 1731 | Robert Sorsbie | |
| 1732 | Richard Ridley | |
| 1733 | Matthew Ridley | MP for Newcastle-upon-Tyne, 1747-74 |
| 1734 | William Ellison | |
| 1735 | Sir Walter Blackett, Bart | MP for Newcastle-upon-Tyne, 1734–77 |
| 1736 | Nicholas Fenwick | |
| 1737 | William Carr | |
| 1738 | Nathaniel Clayton | |
| 1739 | Cuthbert Fenwick | |
| 1740 | Edward Collingwood | |
| 1741 | Robert Sorsbie | |
| 1742 | John Simpson | |
| 1743 | Ralph Sowerby | |
| 1744 | John Ord (d) | |
| 1744 | Matthew Ridley | MP for Newcastle-upon-Tyne, 1747–74 |
| 1745 | Cuthbert Smith | |
| 1746 | Nicholas Fenwick | |
| 1747 | NicholasFenwick | |
| 1748 | Sir Walter Blackett, Bart | MP for Newcastle-upon-Tyne, 1734–77 |
| 1749 | Robert Sorsbie | |
| 1750 | Ralph Sowerby | |
| 1751 | Matthew Ridley | |
| 1752 | Henry Partis | |
| 1753 | Henry Eden | |
| 1754 | Cuthbert Smit | |
| 1755 | William Clayton | |
| 1756 | Sir Walter Blackett, Baronet | MP for Newcastle-upon-Tyne, 1734–77 |
| 1757 | Matthew Bell | |
| 1758 | Ralph Sowerby | |
| 1759 | Matthew Ridley | |
| 1760 | Henry Partis | |
| 1761 | Aubone Surtees | |
| 1762 | Cuthbert Smith | |
| 1763 | William Clayton | |
| 1764 | Sir Walter Blackett, Bart | MP for Newcastle-upon-Tyne, 1734–77 |
| 1765 | John Erasmus Blackett | Businessman |
| 1766 | Matthew Scafe | |
| 1767 | Edward Mosley | |
| 1768 | John Baker | |
| 1769 | Francis Forster | |
| 1770 | Aubone Surtees | |
| 1771 | Sir Walter Blackett, Bart | MP for Newcastle-upon-Tyne, 1734–77 |
| 1772 | John Erasmus Blackett | Businessman |
| 1773 | Matthew Scafe (d) | |
| 1773 | Edward Mosley | |
| 1774 | Sir Matthew White Ridley, 2nd Baronet | MP for Morpeth, 1768 and Newcastle, 1774 |
| 1775 | Charles Atkinson | |
| 1776 | John Baker | |
| 1777 | John Hedley | |
| 1778 | Hugh Hornby | |
| 1779 | Francis Forster | |
| 1780 | John Erasmus Blackett | |
| 1781 | Edward Mosley | |
| 1782 | Sir Matthew White Ridley, 2nd Baronet | MP for Morpeth, 1768 and Newcastle, 1774 |
| 1783 | Charles Atkinson | |
| 1784 | James Rudman | |
| 1785 | William Yielder | |
| 1786 | Francis Johnson | |
| 1787 | William Cramlington | |
| 1788 | John Hedley | |
| 1789 | Hugh Hornby | |
| 1790 | John Erasmus Blackett | Businessman |
| 1791 | Sir Matthew White Ridley, 2nd Baronet | MP for Morpeth, 1768 and Newcastle, 1774 |
| 1792 | James Rudman | |
| 1793 | William Yielder | |
| 1794 | Francis Johnson | |
| 1795 | Richard Chambers | |
| 1796 | William Cramlington | |
| 1797 | Anthony Hood | |
| 1798 | John Wallis | |
| 1799 | Robert Shafto Hedley | |
| 1800 | Archibald Reed | |
| 1801 | Joseph Forster | |
| 1802 | Thomas Clennell | |
| 1803 | Thomas Smith | |
| 1804 | Robert Clayton | |
| 1805 | Henry Cramlington | |
| 1806 | Archibald Reed | |
| 1807 | Anthony Hood | |
| 1808 | Joseph Forster | |
| 1809 | Isaac Cookson, jnr. | |
| 1810 | Thomas Burdon | |
| 1811 | George Forster | |
| 1812 | Robert Clayton | |
| 1813 | Thomas Smith | |
| 1814 | Benjamin Sorsbie | |
| 1815 | Henry Cramlington | |
| 1816 | Sir Thomas Burdon | |
| 1817 | Robert Clayton | |
| 1818 | Joseph Forster | |
| 1819 | Archibald Reed | |
| 1820 | George ForsterJ | |
| 1821 | Aubone Surtees | |
| 1822 | Robert Bell | |
| 1823 | William Wright | |
| 1824 | Henry Cramlington | |
| 1825 | George Forster | |
| 1826 | Archibald Reed | |
| 1827 | Benjamin Sorsbie | |
| 1828 | Robert Bell | |
| 1829 | George Shadforth | |
| 1830 | Archibald Reed | |
| 1831 | Archibald Reed | |
| 1832 | John Brandling | |
| 1833 | Henry Bell | |
| 1834 | John Lionel Hood | |
| 1835 | Charles John Bigge | |
| 1836 | Joseph Lamb | |
| 1837 | Thomas Emerson Headlam | |
| 1838 | John Fife | |
| 1839 | John Carr | |
| 1840 | John Ridley | |
| 1841 | James Hodgson | |
| 1842 | Thomas Dunn | |
| 1843 | Sir John Fife | |
| 1844 | Addison Langhorn Potter | |
| 1845 | Thomas Emerson Headlam | |
| 1846 | James Archbold | |
| 1847 | Stephen Lowrey | |
| 1848 | James Dent Weatherley | Former Captain of 60th Royal Rifles |
| 1849 | Joseph Crawhall | |
| 1850 | William Armstrong | Corn merchant and improver of the River Tyne |
| 1851 | James Hodgson | |
| 1852 | Nathaniel Grace Lambert | |
| 1853 | Ralph Dodds | |
| 1854 | Isaac Lowthian Bell | Ironmaster |
| 1855 | Ralph Park Philipson | |
| 1856 | Edward Nathaniel Grace | Sheriff, 1854 |
| 1857 | Anthony Nichol | |
| 1858 | Joseph Laycock | |
| 1859 | John Blackwell | |
| 1860 | Henry Ingledew | |
| 1861 | Joseph Armstrong | |
| 1862 | Isaac Lowthian Bell | Ironmaster |
| 1863 | Thomas Hedley | |
| 1864 | Edward Mosley Perkins | |
| 1865 | Ralph Dodds | |
| 1866 | William Hunter | |
| 1867 | Henry Angus | |
| 1868 | James Morrison | |
| 1869 | James Morrison | |
| 1870 | Richard Burdon Sanderson | |
| 1871 | Thomas Leslie Gregson | |
| 1872 | Richard Cail | |
| 1873 | Addison Potter | |
| 1874 | Addison Potter | |
| 1875 | William Haswell Stephenson | |
| 1876 | John Oliver Scott | Alderman, Magistrate, Shipping Owner, Coal Sites Owner, In Mayoral Office for the visit of General Ulysses S. Grant to the North East of England in 1877, (Also in office as Sheriff 1874-75) |
| 1877–78 | Thomas Robinson | |
| 1879 | Richard Cail | |
| 1880–81 | Jonathan Angus | |
| 1882 | Thomas George Gibson | |
| 1883 | Henry William Newton | Surgeon and Alderman |
| 1884 | William Haswell Stephenson | |
| 1885 | Benjamin Chapman Browne | |
| 1886 | Sir Benjamin Chapman Browne | |
| 1887 | William Davies Stephens | |
| 1888 | Thomas Richardson | |
| 1889 | Thomas Bell | Sheriff of Newcastle upon Tyne in the Municipal Year 1885/6. Chairman of Pyman, Bell & Co Ltd, (coal export, timber import, Steam ship management) |
| 1890 | Joseph Baxter Ellis | Principal of John Hindhaugh & Son flour and seed merchant |
| 1891 | William Sutton | |
| 1892 | Edward Culley | |
| 1893 | Stephen Quin | |
| 1894 | William Haswell Stephenson | |
| 1895 | Riley Lord | |
| 1896 | John Goolden | |
| 1897 | Thomas Barkas Sanderson | |
| 1898 | George Harkus | |
| 1899 | Sir Riley Lord | |
| 1900 | John Beattie | |
| 1901 | Henry William Newton | |
| 1902 | Sir William Haswell Stephenson | fourth term |
| 1903 | Andrew Peter Anderson | |
| 1904 | Joseph Baxter Ellis | |
| 1905 | Sir Joseph Baxter Ellis | |
| 1906 | John Matthew Oubridge | |
| 1907 | William John Sanderson | |
| 1908 | John James Forster | |
| 1909 | Sir William Haswell Stephenson | |
| 1910 | Sir William Haswell Stephenson | |
| 1911 | Sir William Haswell Stephenson | |
| 1912 | John Frederick Weidner | |
| 1913 | Johnstone Wallace | |
| 1914 | John Fitzgerald | Brewer |
| 1915–17 | George Lunn | Liberal Party politician |
| 1918 | Arthur Munro Sutherland | Shipowner and philanthropist |
| 1919 | Walter Lee | |
| 1920 | Thomas William Rowe | |
| 1921 | Richard Henry Millican | |
| 1922 | William Bramble | |
| 1923 | Stephen Easten | |
| 1924 | Walter Lee | |
| 1925 | Anthony Oates | |
| 1926 | Arthur William Lambert | |
| 1927 | Stephen Easten | |
| 1928 | Arthur William Lambert | |
| 1929 | Joseph Stephenson | |
| 1930 | David Adams | MP for Newcastle upon Tyne West 1922 to 1923 and Consett 1935 to 1943 |
| 1931 | John George Nixon jnr. | |
| 1932 | Joseph William Leech | |
| 1933 | John Leadbitter | |
| 1934 | Robert Stanley Dalgleish | |
| 1935 | William Locke | |
| 1936 | John Grantham | |
| 1937 | Gilbert Oliver | |
| 1938 | William Robert Wallace | |
| 1939 | Adamson Dawson Russell | |
| 1940 | Adamson Dawson Russell | |
| 1941 | George Dixon | |
| 1942 | Walter Thompson | |
| 1944 | Thomas Clements | |
| 1945 | James Alexander Clydesdale | |
| 1946 | James Pearson | |
| 1947–48 | Thomas McCutcheon | |
| 1949 | Aaron Charlton Curry | |
| 1950 | Norman Hackworth Chapman | |
| 1951 | William McKeag | |
| 1952 | Violet Hardisty Grantham | |
| 1953 | William McKeag | |
| 1954 | Robert Mould-Graham | |
| 1955 | Henry Waller | |
| 1956 | Aaron Charlton Curry (d) | |
| 1956 | Violet Hardisty Grantham | |
| 1957 | John William Telford | |
| 1958 | Dorothy Ann Fitzpatrick | |
| 1959 | Catherine Campbell Scott | |
| 1960 | Gladys Robson | |
| 1961 | Henry Russell | |
| 1962 | George Jacobson | |
| 1963 | Henry Simm (d) | |
| 1963 | Peter Henry Renwick | |
| 1964 | Peter Henry Renwick | |
| 1965 | Theresa Science Russell | |
| 1966 | Jonathan Farries Burton | |
| 1967 | Albert Roy Hadwin | |
| 1968 | Robert Skinner Gray | |
| 1969 | William Ritchie Samuel Forsyth | |
| 1970 | William Harding | |
| 1971 | Madge Elaine Graham | |
| 1972 | Arthur Grey | |
| 1973 | Arthur Grey | |
| 1974 | Margaret Collins | Honorary Freeman in 1980, represented St. Lawrence until 1982 |
| 1975 | Iris Margaret Steedman | Represented West City Ward until 1992. Honorary Alderman 1992 Awarded an MBE in 1999. |
| 1976 | Hugh Jackson White | Represented Blakelaw Ward until 1987. |
| 1977 | Thomas Watson Collins | Honorary Freeman in 1980 Represented Monkchester Ward to 1987. Honorary Alderman in 1987. |
| 1978 | Doris Alma Starkey | Represented Elswick Ward until 1981. |
| 1979 | Margaret Stevens Murray | Represented Moorside Ward until 1983. |
| 1980 | John Charlton Kerrigan | Represent Woolsington Ward until 1997. Honorary Alderman in 1997. |
| 1981 | Bennie Abrahams | Represented Monkchester Ward until 1986. Honorary Alderman in 1986. |
| 1982 | Thomas William Yellowley | Represented Benwell Ward until his death in 1995 |
| 1983 | Arthur Fletcher Stabler | Represent West City Ward until his death in 1997 |
| 1984 | Norman Stockdale | Represented Walker Ward until his death in 1987 |
| 1985 | Royston Craig Burgess | Represented Walker Ward until his death in 1987 |
| 1986 | James Peter Laing | Represented Fawdon Ward until 2004. Honorary Alderman 2005 |
| 1987 | Stanley John Clark Allan | Represented Woolsington Ward until his death in 1991 |
| 1988 | Derek Webster | Represented Lemington Ward until 1990 |
| 1989 | Terence Cooney | Represented Fenham Ward until his death in 2008. |
| 1990 | Cuthbert Stephenson | Represented Denton Ward until 1996. Honorary Alderman in 1996 |
| 1991 | Thomas Johnston Marr | Represented Byker Ward until his death in 1998 |
| 1992 | Cecil Arthur Cook | Represented Benwell Ward until his death in 2002 |
| 1993 | Joan Margaret Lamb | Represented Scotswood Ward until 2000. Honorary Alderman in 2000 |
| 1994 | Robert Crofton Brown | Represented Newburn Ward until his death in 1996 |
| 1995 | Bernard Rice | Represent Walkergate Ward until 2004. Honorary Alderman in 2005 |
| 1996 | Leslie Alexander Russell | Represented Monkchester Ward until 1999. Honorary Alderman in 1999. |
| 1997 | Mary Isabel Nixon | Represented Newburn Ward until her death in 2002 |
| 1998 | Thomas Daniel Marshall | Represented Newburn Ward until 2004. Honorary Alderman in 2005. |
| 1999 | John Cunningham | Represented Walker Ward until his death in July 2003 |
| 2000 | Peter John Stuart Thomson | Represented Elswick Ward until 2004 |
| 2001 | Mary Jane Carr | Represented Denton Ward until 2004. |
| 2002 | John Marshall | Represented Wingrove Ward until 2004. Honorary Alderman in 2008 |
| 2003 | Margaret Richardson Carter | Represented Kenton Ward until 2012. |
| 2004 | George William Douglas | Represented Walker Ward until 2007. Honorary Alderman in 2007. |
| 2005 | David Serge Slesenger | Represented East Gosforth Ward until 2018 |
| 2006 | Diane Margaret Packham | Represented Parklands Ward until 2017 |
| 2007 | Peter John Arnold | Represented Denton Ward until 2010 |
| 2008 | David Leslie Wood | Represented Walker Ward as of 2019 |
| 2009 | Michael Cookson | Represented East Gosforth ward to 2011 |
| 2010 | Brenda Hindmarsh | Represented Fawdon & West Gosforth Ward as of 2019 |
| 2011 | Geoff O'Brien | Represented Westgate Ward |
| 2012 | Jackie Slesenger | Represented West Gosforth until 2018 |
| 2013 | Margaret Wood | Represented Walker Ward as of 2019 |
| 2014 | George Pattison | Represented Kingston Park South and Newbiggin Hall Ward as of 2019 |
| 2015 | Ian Graham | Represented Castle Ward until 2018 |
| 2016 | Hazel Stephenson | Represented Benwell and Scotswood Ward until 2026 |
| 2017 | Linda Wright | Represented Callerton & Throckley Ward until 2026 |
| 2018 | David Down | Represented Parklands Ward until 2019 |
| 2019 | David Cook | Represented Lemington Ward until 2026 |
| 2020 | David Cook | Represented Lemington Ward until 2026 |
| 2021 | Habib Rahman | Represents Elswick Ward until 2026 (First non-white person to hold the post since its creation) |
| 2022 | Karen Robinson | |
| 2023 | Veronica Dunn | |
| 2024 | Rob Higgins | |
| 2025 | Henry Gallagher | |
| 2026 | Henry Gallagher | |

== Source ==
- "Mayors and Sheriffs 1216 to date" (PDF). Newcastle City Council.
