= Thomas Horsley =

Merchant adventurer and former Lord Mayor of Newcastle upon Tyne

Thomas Horsley (1462–ca.1545) was a Northumberland corn merchant and merchant adventurer, (Note: This was the name given to an English merchant who traded with the Low Countries (i.e. Brabant, Flanders, Holland and Zeeland).) who by the start of 16th century was a prominent citizen of Newcastle upon Tyne in North East England. As well as becoming a local magistrate, he was Sheriff of Newcastle in 1512 and its Lord Mayor in 1514, 1519, 1524–5 (for consecutive years) and 1533. In various official capacities, Horsley played an active role in defending the town's mercantile interests, and in 1522, during the Anglo-Scottish Wars, also served as a captain in forces of the English crown under the command of Lord Conyers. He is remembered today primarily as the founder of Newcastle's Royal Grammar School.

== See also ==
- List of mayors of Newcastle-upon-Tyne
