= Monument Mall =

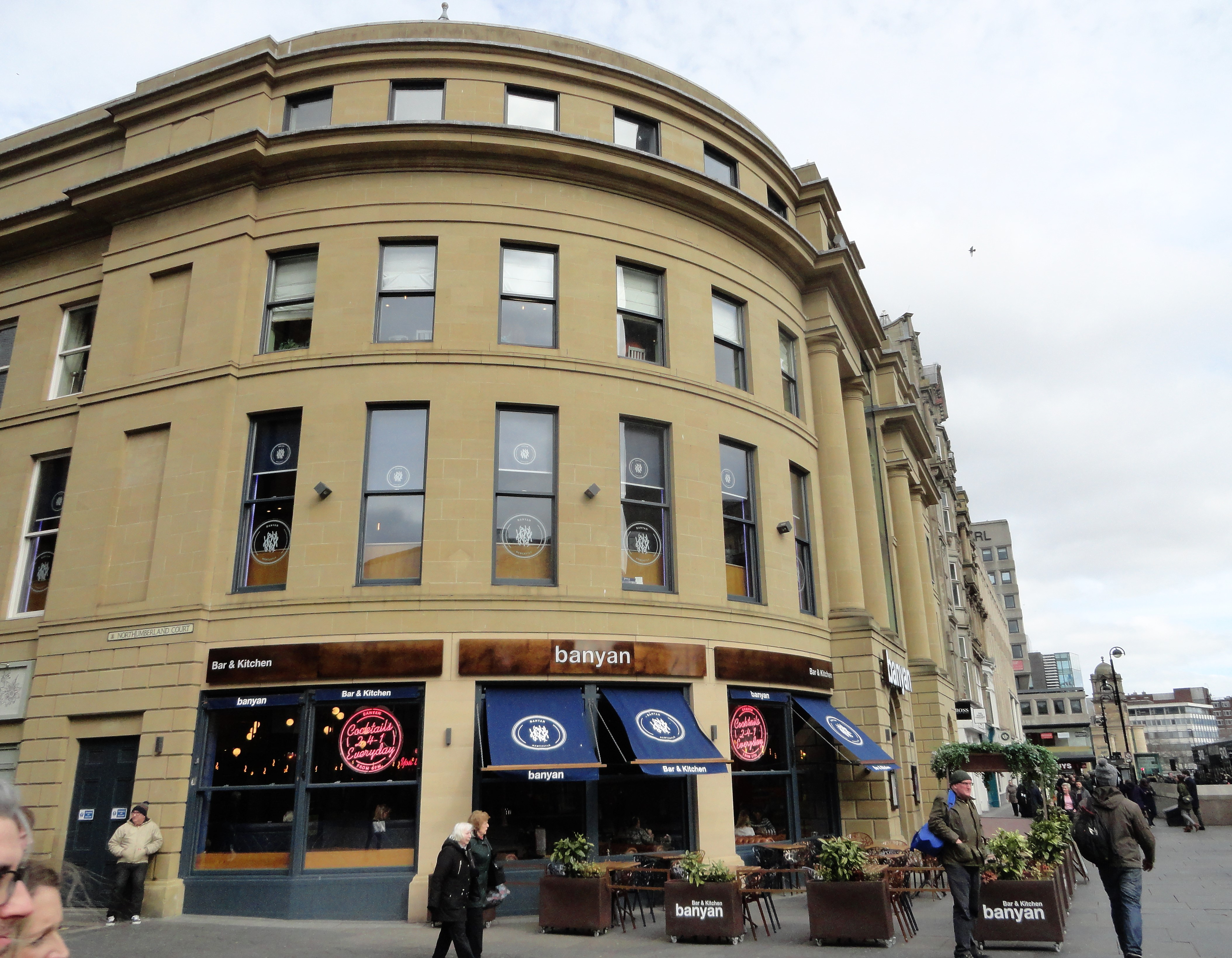
- Monument Mall, West side
- Interactive map of the Monument Mall area

General information
- Location: Newcastle upon Tyne, England, UK
- Coordinates: 54.974°N 1.614°W
- OS grid: NZ248644

Monument Mall is a shopping centre in central Newcastle upon Tyne, England. The centre is currently owned by Motcomb Estates, the property investment vehicle of David and Simon Reuben, and was purchased for £37m in April 2021.

The Mall opened in 1992 adjacent to the Monument station on the Tyne and Wear Metro. It is also directly in front of Grey's Monument and Grey Street, and has an entrance on Northumberland Street.

Former owners include St Martins Property Group, before being acquired by the retail property company Hammerson for £28m in March 2011, and then sold again to investment firm Aberdeen Standard Investments for £75m in December 2015.

== Refurbishment ==
In December 2011, planning permission was granted to reconfigure the shopping mall to provide an additional 14,000 ft^{2} of retail floor space, infill the atrium and walkways at all levels, and create eight well-configured ground floor unit shops with flexible floor plates and with basement trading potential. The refurbishment cost £15 million.

Since the refurbishment, all stores that were originally located in Monument Mall have closed, except for TK Maxx (which opened a new flagship store in November 2012) and the entrance to Fenwick (which was reopened in December 2013).
