= Roger Thornton =

England merchant and Member of Parliament (died 1430)

Mayor of Newcastle upon Tyne
- Terms; 1400–01; 1402–06; 1416–17; 1423–26
- Terms; 1400–1426

Member of Parliament for Newcastle upon Tyne
- Parliamentary terms 1399; 1411; 1417; 1419
- Parliamentary terms 1399–1419

Personal details
- Died: 3 January 1430 Newcastle upon Tyne, England
- Occupation: Merchant; politician
- Known for: Leading Newcastle merchant; multiple-term Mayor of Newcastle

Roger Thornton (died 1430), the Dick Whittington of Newcastle, seems to have been a country boy who sought his fortune in town. He lived to become 'the richest merchant that ever was dwelling in Newcastell', and three times mayor of that town.

== History ==
The old saying was:

At the Westgate came Thornton in
With a hap, a halfpenny, and a lambskin.

He was elected Mayor of Newcastle for 1400–01, 1402–1406, 1416–17 and 1423–1426, a total of 9 times.

He took the side of Henry IV against the rebel Earl of Northumberland (in whose cause Hotspur had fallen) and received on 28 July 1405 "in consideration of his services and of the losses he had sustained, and the charges he had borne in the late rebellion of the Earl of Northumberland, and others, the Foucher (Fugar) House in Whickham, as well as other estates in Cleveland."

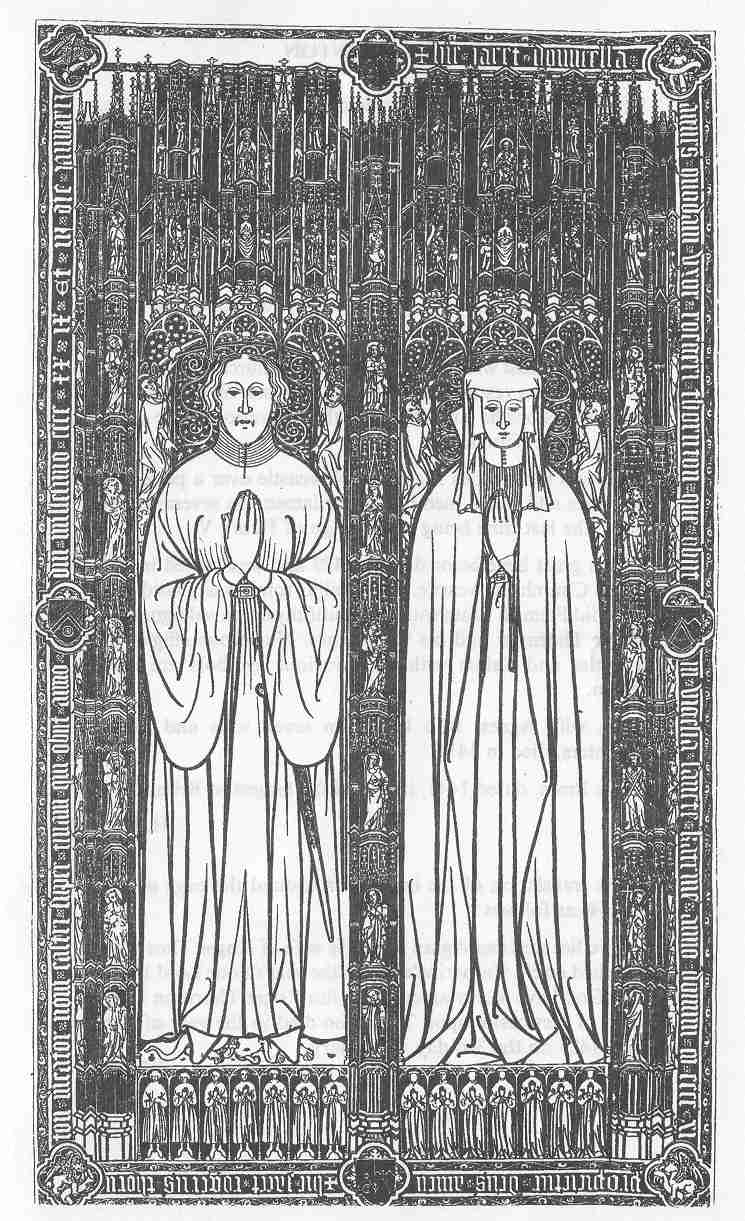
Monumental brass of Roger and Agnes Thornton and their children, now in Newcastle Cathedral; originally in All Saints' Church, Newcastle upon Tyne.

He represented Newcastle upon Tyne in parliament in 1399, 1411, 1417 and 1419, the last being the fifth year of the reign of Henry V.

Thornton was a speculator in lead mines, and he was certainly working some in Weardale under lease from the Bishop of Durham in 1401. He was remembered for his liberality to Newcastle, building a town court and also a Maison Dieu or hospital for poor people in the Sandhill.

Thornton died in the Broad Chare in Newcastle on 3 January 1430. His monumental brass, of the incised, Flemish type, is now in Newcastle Cathedral, and is said to be the largest brass in the country. It was originally installed in the medieval All Saints' Church, Newcastle upon Tyne nearby, which was later demolished and rebuilt. The brass is certainly one of the finest; Thornton's seven sons and seven daughters appear below the principal figures. Thornton's is one of the four effigies of Northumberland worthies above 43–45 Northumberland Street in Newcastle.
