= Jacob Kroger =

German goldsmith and thief

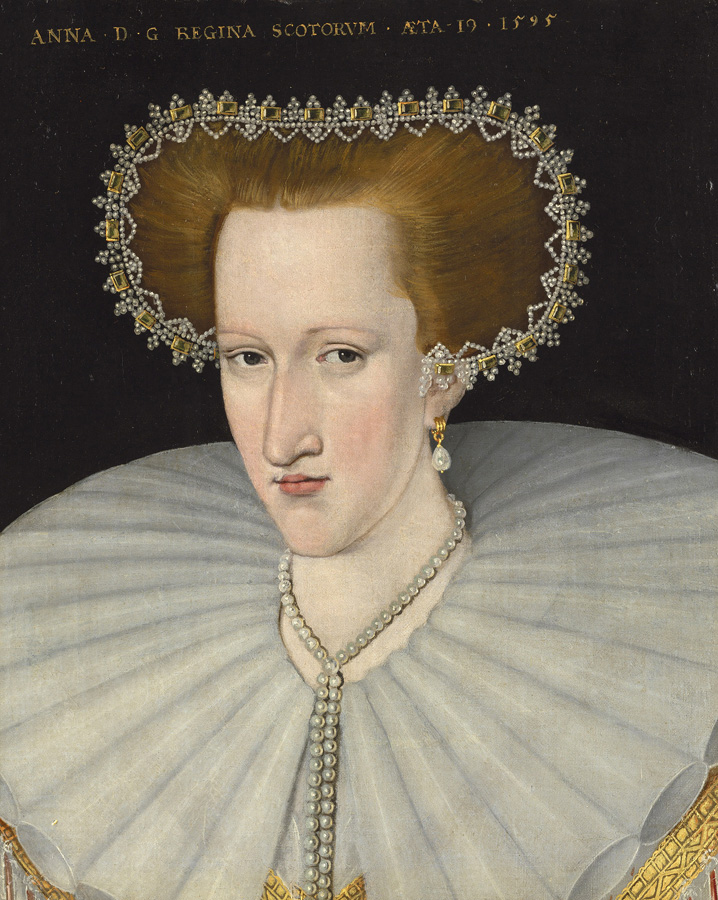
Jacob Kroger made and repaired jewels for Anne of Denmark then stole them.

Jacob Kroger (died 1594) was a German goldsmith who worked for Anne of Denmark in Scotland and stole her jewels.

Kroger was a citizen of the Principality of Lüneburg, ruled by Anne of Denmark's brother-in-law, Henry Julius, Duke of Brunswick-Lüneburg. He completed his apprenticeship as a goldsmith at Lüneburg in 1575 instructed by the master goldsmiths Tönnies Dierssen or Dirksen and Steffen Ulrichs or Olrikes. Dierssen, whose hallmark was an antelope, made objects such as highly decorative spoons, and cups. Kroger's Lüneburg contemporaries Luleff Meier and Dirich Utermarke made a mirror frame decorated with theme of Nebuchadnezzar from the Book of Daniel.

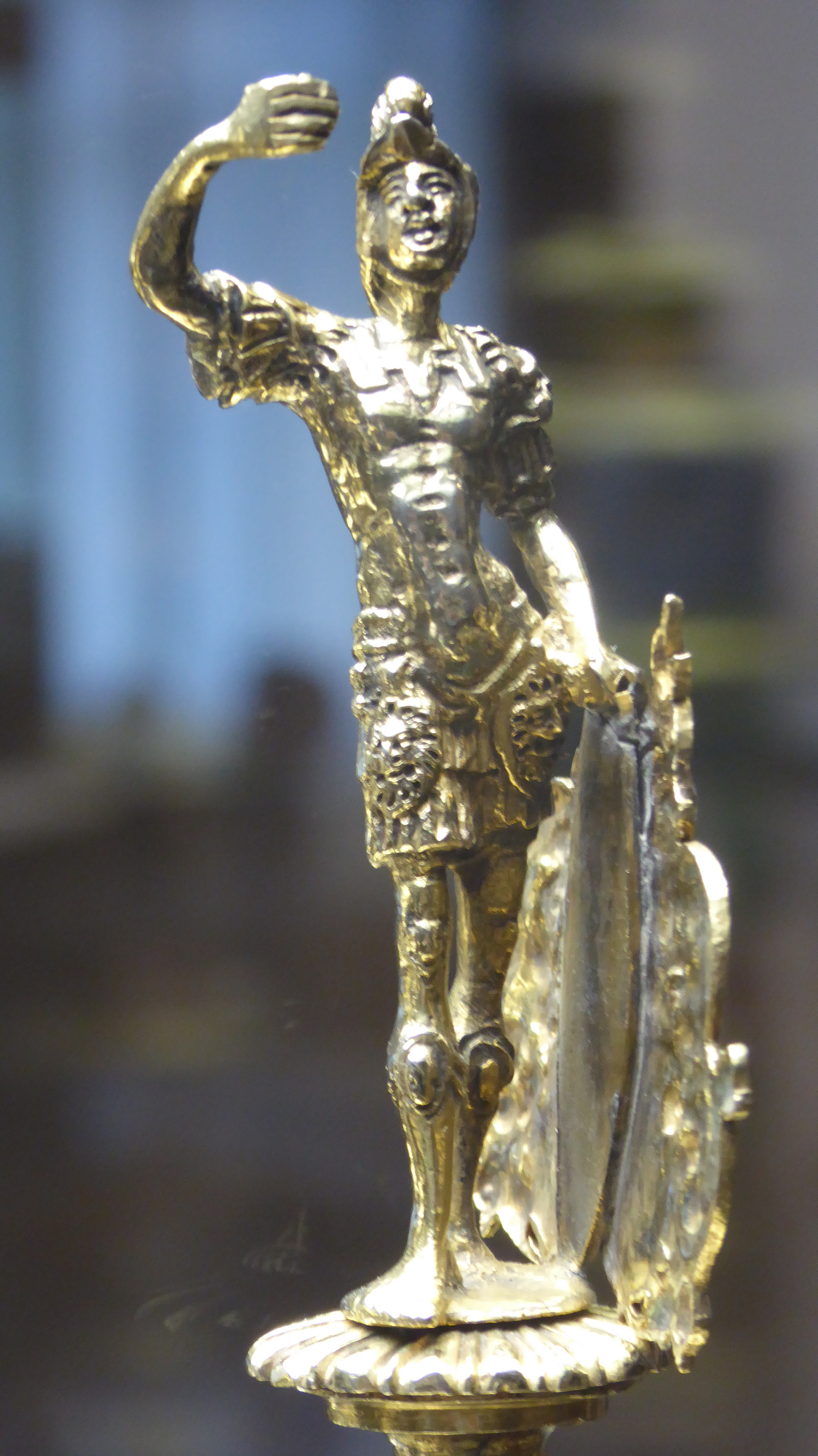
Figure for the cover of a cup by Tönnies Dierssen, one of Jacob Kroger's teachers, Kunstgewerbemuseum Berlin

Jacob Kroger came to Scotland with Anne of Denmark and her husband James VI of Scotland in 1590. He was a member of her household and was accommodated with her at Holyroodhouse or Dunfermline Palace, where he would eat his meals at the head of a table with other Danish servants, including her tailors, the keeper of her furs, her cellar man and carpenter. These were lower status servants, who dined in a separate room from the queen at "the second table for the Danes in her Grace's Master Household's Hall." John Carey, an English official at Berwick upon Tweed met Kroger, and wrote, "This Dane was the queen's jeweller and made most of her jewels himself and had the keeping of most of them."

== Jewel thieves ==
In April 1594 Kroger and a French servant, Guillaume Martyn, a footman who worked in the king's stables (and had taken care of the king's camel), decided to steal some of the queen's jewels and return to their home countries via England, because they had not been paid. After petitioning the king and queen for money with no results, they were "very weary of their service". They left Edinburgh at night and crossed the Tweed near Kelso. They were seen on the road between Belford and Alnwick by Captain Carvell, a soldier at Bewcastle, and came to Tweedmouth. According to John Carey, instead of making further progress, they remained near Newcastle upon Tyne for a few days. Carey could easily have taken them, but no word of their crime was heard from Edinburgh for three days. On 3 May John Colville wrote to the poet Henry Lok in London with news of the theft for Sir Robert Cecil.

=== Capture ===
On 6 May 1594 they met the Earl of Bothwell, who was a fugitive in the north of England, at Edward Delaval's house at North Shields and he took all, or nearly all, their possessions. Then George Selby, Sheriff of Newcastle, and Thomas Power, a servant of the Earl of Northumberland and Lieutenant of Tynemouth Castle, arrested them, following requests from James VI. Power had to pay a fee of 5 shillings to the Bailiff of North Shields to make the arrest. The Bailiff had prevented Bothwell taking Kroger and Martyn back to Scotland and had summoned Power and Selby.

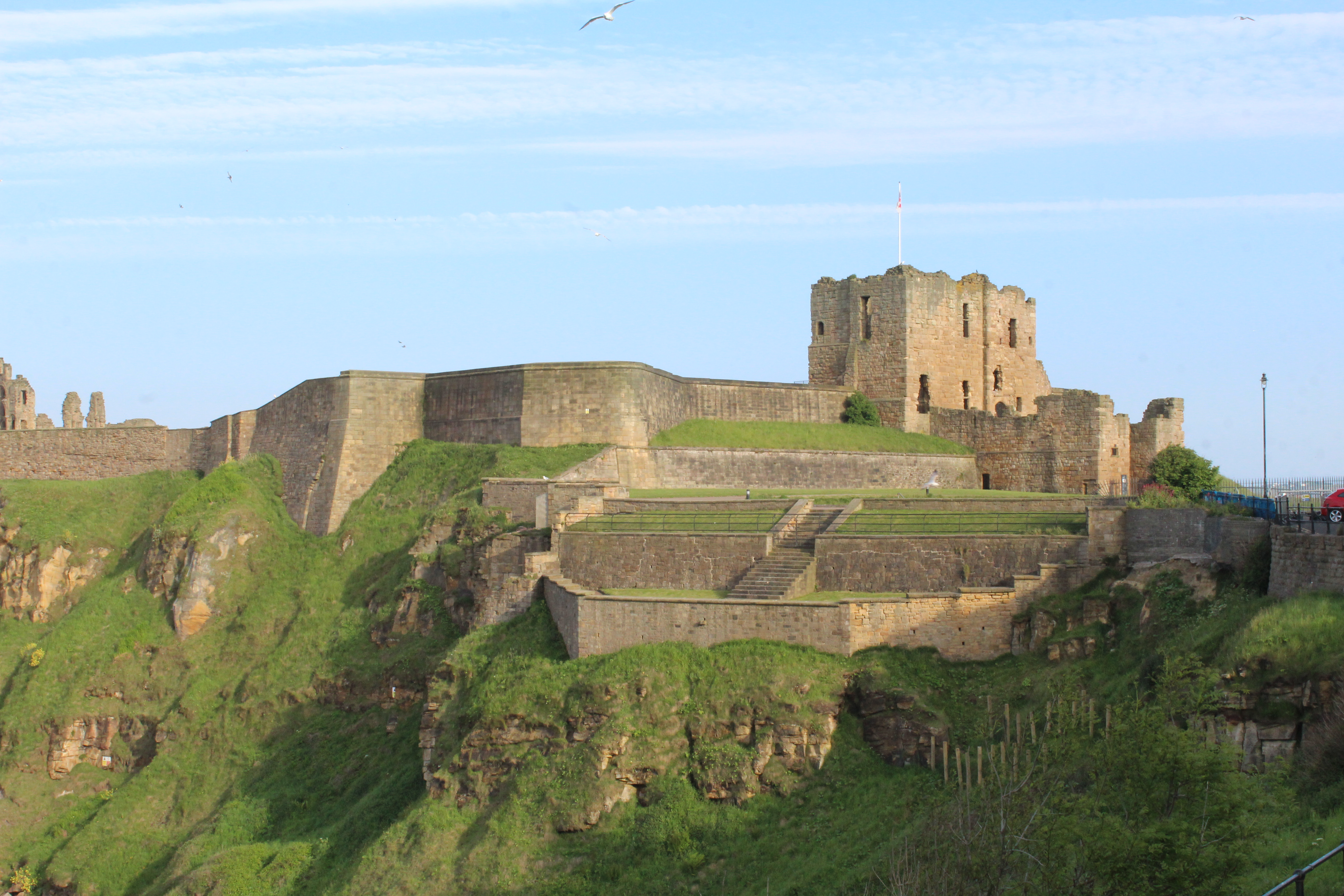
Jacob Kroger and his partner Guillaume Martyn spent a month in Tynemouth Castle before their rendition.

The prisoners were taken to Tynemouth Castle, and stayed there for five weeks. There was a conflict of authority and jurisdictions in Northumberland over the fugitives. Several English landowners were friends to Bothwell and welcomed him in their houses, despite a proclamation forbidding this. The Bailiff of Shields had taken control of the situation at Edward Delaval's house, and allowed the Earl of Northumberland's men to arrest Kroger and Martyn. Sir John Forster, warden of the Middle March, asked Lionel Maddison, the Mayor of Newcastle, about the arrest and the whereabouts of the prisoners and he denied all knowledge.

The Mayor of Newcastle, Lionel Maddison, wrote to Robert Cecil with news of the arrest. Thomas Power described some of the jewels in a letter to the Earl of Northumberland as goldsmith's work, neckchains, and bracelets of ragged pearl. He enclosed an inventory of the jewels, with values provided by "James Krugar of Lunburg" and signed "Jachob Kroger", which includes: a chain of pearls to go twice about her neck worth 60 crowns, a black stone heart set in gold with a pendant pearl worth 2 crowns, two double pearl rings for a gown worth 60 crowns, and gold shells of two sizes and aiglettes for the body of the queen's gowns worth 600 crowns.

Robert Bowes, an English diplomat in Edinburgh, wrote on 18 May to William Cecil that James VI wanted the men and the jewels returned to Scotland, and on 9 June that Bothwell had taken some of the jewels, and wanted to use them to make his peace, to effect his reconciliation, with James VI. James wanted the prisoners sent to John Carey at Berwick upon Tweed and delivered to his representative, John Hume of Hutton Hall. James VI described the thieves as "twa limers deuces". Thomas Power brought the prisoners to John Carey at Berwick. Carey sent another version of the inventory of the jewels to Robert Cecil, with a receipt from Thomas Power for a bag of red buckram tied with white tape containing the gold studs and aiglettes, two wings of a gown sewn with pearls, the nether skirt of an old black satin gown, a pair of blue taffeta sleeves, white taffeta from the lining of a garment, and two pieces of carnation coloured satin. According to Krogar and Martyn, Bothwell had kept the other jewels including rings, bracelets, and the black heart. Krogar signed this statement "Jachob Kroger Van Lunebarge".

Mary, Queen of Scots had owned velvet gowns embroidered with pearls, but an inventory of Anne of Denmark's clothes made in 1608 only mentions three items with seed pearls and none with aglets, and such adornments may have gone out of fashion. Thomas Power mentioned "ragged pearls", which were used to embroider Elizabeth's gowns and were used in 1602 to refurbish an old gown given to Lady Kildare. There was a stock of ragged pearls, regarded as of small value, in Anne of Denmark's wardrobe in 1619.

=== Rendition ===
Sir John Selby of Twizell, English deputy warden of the East March, delivered Kroger, Martyn, and the jewels to John Hume of Hutton Hall, the Scottish deputy warden of the East March, on 11 June 1594, a day of truce, at the west ford of Norham. Hume gave Selby a receipt for both men and jewels with another inventory, which mentions the silk threading attached to the aiglettes and studs in the red bag.

The two fugitives were returned to Edinburgh and they were executed by hanging three days later on Friday, 14 June 1594 after a brief trial.

Maureen Meikle explains that the Earl of Bothwell was Anne of Denmark's ally, and she had supported him in defiance of her husband, and so he may have intercepted Kroger and Martyn in order to prevent her things falling into English hands.

The queen's next goldsmith was a Frenchman, called "Clei" (presumably Elias Le Tellier), succeeded on 27 July 1597 by George Heriot. Ten years later, jewels were allegedly stolen from Anne of Denmark by Margaret Hartsyde, and after her death in 1619 by her Danish servant Anna Kaas and a French page Piero Hugon.
