= George Selby =

English politician (c. 1557–1625)

Sir George Selby (c. 1557–1625) was an English politician who sat in the House of Commons between 1601 and 1611. Selby was the son of William Selby and his wife Elizabeth Fenwick, daughter of Gerard Fenwick of Newcastle.

== Career ==
He was a sheriff (1594), an alderman (by 1600 to his death) and 4 times mayor of Newcastle (in 1600, 1606, 1611 and 1622). In 1601, he was elected Member of Parliament for Newcastle-upon-Tyne.

On 6 May 1594 George Selby captured two fugitives from the Scottish court, Jacob Kroger, the German goldsmith serving Anne of Denmark and Guillaume Martyn, a French attendant in the stables of James VI of Scotland who had looked after the king's camel. They had taken some jewelry belonging to the queen. A letter of John Carey gives some details. According to Carey the two men were "very weary of their service" because they had not been paid. They crossed the Tweed near Kelso and came to Tweedmouth. The Earl of Bothwell, who was a fugitive in the north of England, met them at Edward Delaval's house at North Shields and took all their possessions. Then George Selby and Thomas Power lieutenant of Tynemouth arrested them, and took them to Tynemouth Castle, from where they were returned to Edinburgh and executed. Thomas Power described some of jewels in a letter to the Earl of Northumberland as goldsmith's work, neckchains, and bracelets of ragged pearl, including a black bone heart set in gold with a pendant pearl, two double pearl rings for a gown, and gold shells and aiglettes for the body of the queen's gowns.

He was knighted at the coronation of James I on 23 July 1603. In 1604 he was re-elected MP for Newcastle. He was pricked High Sheriff of Northumberland for 1607, and then appointed High Sheriff of Durham for life by the Bishop of Durham. He was elected MP for Northumberland in 1614 but disqualified by Parliament, partly on the grounds of being a sheriff.

King James came to Newcastle on 23 April 1617. He stayed with Selby. Selby's inventory detailed the furnishings of the "King's Chamber", which contained three bedsteads, and mirror called a "seeing glass", a Chiness cabinet, and other items.

== Personal life ==
Selby married Margaret Selby, daughter of Sir John Selby of Twizell, and sister of William Selby (died 1612).

== Death ==
Selby died at the age of 69 and was buried at the church of St Nicholas. His monument, with an inscription which referred to his hospitality to the king, was removed in 1777.

Parliament of England
Preceded by	Member of Parliament for Newcastle-upon-Tyne; 1601–1611	Succeeded by
