= Nicholas Fenwick =

British Tory politician

Nicholas Fenwick (c. 1693–1752) of Pilgrim Street, Newcastle-upon-Tyne, and Lemington, Northumberland was a British Tory politician who sat in the House of Commons from 1727 to 1747.

Fenwick was the eldest son of Robert Fenwick, merchant and mayor of Newcastle in 1708, and Isabella Ellison, daughter of Cuthbert Ellison of Hebburn, county Durham. He married Elizabeth Baker, daughter of George Baker of Crook, county Durham on 21 October 1713. She died in March 1715. He married as his second wife on 9 May 1716, Elizabeth Clavering, daughter of Sir James Clavering, 4th Baronet, of Axwell, county Durham. By her, he acquired Lemington, in Alnwick, where he practised forestry. He received a gold medal from the Society of Arts for his forestry work.

Fenwick was admitted to the Merchant Adventurers Company in 1712. He was Mayor of Newcastle in 1726. At the 1727 British general election he was returned as Tory Member of Parliament for Newcastle-upon-Tyne. He voted against the Administration in every recorded division. In 1733 he was given a vote of thanks by the Merchant Adventurers for his keen opposition to the Excise Bill. He was returned again at the 1734 British general election. In 1736 he was Mayor of Newcastle again. He was returned again at the 1741 British general election. He was Mayor of Newcastle again for the years 1746 and 1747. He retired from Parliament at the 1747 British general election.

Fenwick died in 1752 and was buried on 27 February..He had six son and seven daughters by his second wife.

Parliament of Great Britain
Preceded by Sir William Blackett, Bt; William Carr	Member of Parliament for Newcastle-upon-Tyne; 1727–1747; With: Sir William Blackett, Bt 1727–1729; William Carr 1729–1734; Sir Walter Calverley-Blackett, Bt 1734–1747	Succeeded by Sir Walter Calverley-Blackett, Bt; Matthew Ridley
