= Violet Grantham =

British politician

Violet Hardisty Grantham (15 February 1893 – 20 May 1983) was a British politician, the first woman to serve as Sheriff of Newcastle-upon-Tyne and Lord Mayor of Newcastle-upon-Tyne.

Born Violet Hardisty Taylor in Gateshead on 15 February 1893, the second of three children born to Thomas Taylor, a schoolmaster at St Cuthbert's High School, and Sarah Taylor (née McKelvie), formerly a pupil-teacher.

She was educated privately and married John Grantham in 1924. Her husband, a cinema proprietor, was elected to Newcastle City Council in 1912, later holding the titles of Sheriff of Newcastle-upon-Tyne in 1924-1925 and Lord Mayor of Newcastle-upon-Tyne in 1936-37 respectively.

In addition to being his Lady Mayoress, Violet served on the boards of a number of local organisations and in 1937 she was elected to Newcastle City Council in her own right, representing the Conservative Party. In 1950 she became the first woman to serve as Sheriff of Newcastle-upon-Tyne later being elected as an alderman of Newcastle City Council in 1952, being the first woman elected to serve as Lord Mayor of Newcastle-upon-Tyne. In 1956, Violet briefly held this post again due to the death of Aaron Curry. She again became an elected councillor in 1958 and was granted Honorary Freedom of the City in 1966, serving until the reorganisation of local government in 1974, when she retired.

Civic offices
Preceded by William McKeag	Lord Mayor of Newcastle-upon-Tyne; 1952–1953	Succeeded by William McKeag
Preceded by Aaron Curry	Lord Mayor of Newcastle-upon-Tyne; 1957	Succeeded by John William Telford
