= Humphrey Dethick =

Humphrey Dethick (born 1577) was an English merchant on the Italian peninsula who killed a man in Scotland in 1602 during a royal christening.

== Career ==
He was the son of William Dethick and his wife Helen, of Smithston in Derbyshire. He went to school in Ashbourne, and then was briefly at Cambridge. Dethick said his father was a gentleman who sold his inheritance to a Londoner called Storie. He then went to sea, taking French and Spanish prizes with Captain Clegmond. After this he worked for Richard May, a London merchant tailor and woollen draper in Watling Street. His brother Edward Dethick was a silk man in London.

Baptist Hicks employed him as his factor in Italy. Hicks employed factors to ensure the high quality of the fabrics he imported. In Florence a prostitute introduced Dethick to Lorenzo Lucenbardis (Usimbardi), a secretary of Ferdinando I de' Medici, Grand Duke of Tuscany. In Scotland, Dethick had a "stomacher", apparently a jewel, which Usimbardi had given him. He was involved a shipping dispute that came to the attention of Sir Robert Cecil. Dethick left Italy and travelled through France and took a boat to Leith. He had thought of going to Turkey from France and had written to Sir Thomas Shirley, an adventurer who planned to attack the Ottoman Empire, but this didn't work out. In Scotland he hoped to get a royal licence to export leather to Ireland and make his fortune. Roger Aston, an English courtier, introduced him to the king.

== Murder at Dunfermline ==
Robert, the son of James VI of Scotland and Anne of Denmark was christened on 2 May 1602 at Dunfermline Palace. The court and guests assembled at Dunfermline before the event, and the day before the christening Dethick killed a man called James Chambers with a rapier, and wounded two other bystanders, including a barber who was fixing Chamber's hair. On the previous day Dethick had become distressed and Roger Aston had calmed him down. It was thought he might have come to Scotland to assassinate the king.

Dethick was arrested and imprisoned. He seemed insane and was examined by the court physicians, probably Martin Schöner and John Naysmyth, who declared that he was faking his madness. Dethick claimed that he had heard a prophecy in Spain that he should kill someone. Thomas Douglas heard that his father was a baker in London, and that he would be tortured using the rack. He was taken as a prisoner to Edinburgh Castle and claimed his actions sprang from the "madness of drink" only. His trial was delayed because the illness of the king's son Robert, and the king remained at Dunfermline. James was hesitant to punish a man from England who also seemed unfit for trial.

Sir John Carey at Berwick-upon-Tweed heard that Dethick was asleep in his chamber at Dunfermline when others including the victim came into the room to take away his weapons. The details of his confession were kept secret, but it seemed to Carey that Dethick enjoyed the king's favour. News of the events were reported in London, and John Chamberlain wrote on 17 June, "we have likewise much talk of one Dethicke (sometime factor for Hickes in Cheapside at Florence) that should come thence into Scotland with intent to kill the king, but being unable to bear the burden of such an enterprise fell distract and beside himself." Robert Cecil and Queen Elizabeth began to suspect Dethick had been involved in a plot to kill James VI, and sent letters written by Dethick in Italian to Scotland. Dethick sent a petition to James VI saying he came to Scotland only to revive his ancient family's fortune. Elizabeth did not want James VI to spare Dethick any severity on account of him being English. Meanwhile, in June, Dethick's mental health declined and he tore off his clothes. James VI passed the Italian letters to David Foulis for translations.

Dethick's fate is unclear. News of his imprisonment was current in London, and on 27 June Philip Gawdy wrote:

The King of Spain is chief instrument in all, and his finger was deeply in a conspiracy lately intended against the King of Scots, to have been performed by a fellow that was Hix [Baptist Hicks] his man of Cheapside, and an Italian that came not according to appointment. They two should have murdered the King, but the other was taken and has grown mad since his imprisonment.

== Sources ==
- Bain, Joseph (1896). The border papers : Calendar of letters and papers relating to the affairs of the borders of England and Scotland. Vol. 2. Edinburgh: General Register Office.
- Calderwood, David (1845). The History of the Kirk of Scotland. Vol. 6. Edinburgh: Wodrow Society.
- Chamberlain, John (1861). Williams, Sarah (ed.). The letters of John Chamberlain. London: Camden Society.
- Chamberlain, John (1939). McClure, Norman Egbert (ed.). The letters of John Chamberlain; Volume One. Memoirs. Vol. XII, part 1. Philadelphia: American Philosophical Society.
- Green, Mary Anne Everett, ed. (1870). Calendar of state papers, Domestic series, of the reigns of Edward VI., Mary, Elizabeth, 1547–[1625]. Vol. Elizabeth 1601–1603, with Addenda, 1547–1565. London: Longman, Brown, Green, Longmans, & Roberts.
- Mackie, John Duncan, ed. (1969). Calendar of the State Papers Relating to Scotland. Vol. 13: 1597–1603, Pt. 2. Edinburgh: HMSO for the Scottish Record Office.
- Roberts, R. A., ed. (1910). Calendar of the manuscripts of the Most Honourable the Marquess of Salisbury ... preserved at Hatfield House, Hertfordshire, Vol. 12. V. 18-24: [Publication] - Historical Manuscripts Commission; 9. Hereford: Historical Manuscripts Commission.
