= Francis Anderson (MP for Newcastle-upon-Tyne) =

English landowner, politician and MP for Newcastle-upon-Tyne (1614–79)

Alderman Sir Francis Anderson JP

MP for Newcastle-upon-Tyne
- In office 1661–1679
- Preceded by: Sir Francis Anderson
- Succeeded by: William Blackett
- In office 1660–1660
- Preceded by: Robert Ellison; William Calverley
- Succeeded by: Sir Francis Anderson; Sir John Marlay; Sir Robert Slingsby, Bt
Civic offices
Mayor of Newcastle-upon-Tyne
In office 1675–1676
Preceded by	Thomas Jennison
Succeeded by	Sir Ralph Carr
In office 1662–1663
Preceded by	Sir John Marley
Succeeded by	Sir James Clavering
Honorary titles
Sheriff of Newcastle-upon-Tyne
In office 1641–1642
Preceded by	Francis Liddell
Succeeded by	Henry Maddison

Personal details
- Born: Francis Anderson; 21 December 1614 Newcastle-upon-Tyne, Northumberland
- Died: 19 July 1679 (aged 64) Newcastle-upon-Tyne, Northumberland
- Party: Royalist
- Spouse: Jane Dent (d.1673)
- Children: 10
- Relatives: Sir Henry Anderson (cousin)
- Education: Corpus Christi College, Oxford; Gray's Inn
- Occupation: Politician

Sir Francis Anderson JP (21 December 1614 – 19 July 1679) was an English Royalist landowner and politician who represented Newcastle-upon-Tyne once as Sheriff, twice as Mayor and as MP in the House of Commons between 1660 and 1679.

== Early life ==
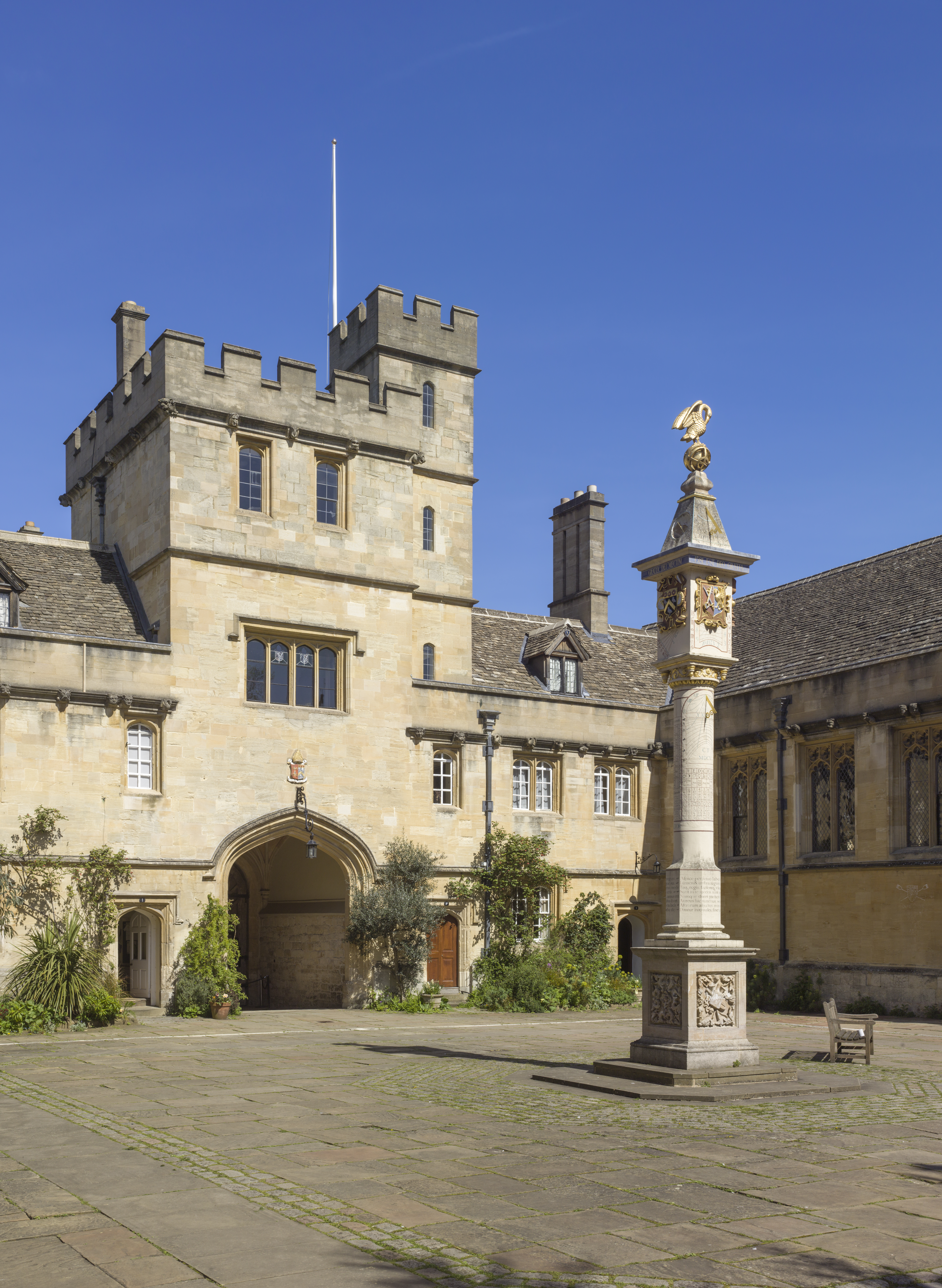
Corpus Christi College, Oxford

Anderson was the only son of Roger Anderson (d.1622) of Jesmond, Newcastle-upon-Tyne and his wife, Anne Jackson, the daughter of William Bower alias Jackson, of Newcastle-upon-Tyne and Oxen-le-Field, County Durham.

Roger Anderson was Sheriff of Newcastle-upon-Tyne (1612–13) and was one of the seven sons of Francis Anderson (d.1623). Francis the Elder had been Sheriff (1595–6) and Mayor (1601–2, 1612–13) of Newcastle-upon-Tyne and was a distant cousin of the Royalist Sir Henry Anderson. Francis Anderson the Younger was educated at Corpus Christi College, Oxford and Gray's Inn.

== Career ==
Anderson was Sheriff (1641–42) and Alderman of Newcastle-upon-Tyne (1642–44 and 1662–79) and was knighted in November 1641. During the Civil War, he "was a devoted loyalist" and as a result was subsequently fined £1,200, stripped of his knighthood, imprisoned and had his property sequestered.

In 1660, Anderson was elected member of parliament for Newcastle-upon-Tyne in the Convention Parliament. He was re-elected MP for Newcastle-upon-Tyne for the Cavalier Parliament (1661) and sat until his death. He was a justice of the peace for County Durham (1660–79) and Mayor of Newcastle-upon-Tyne (1662–63 and 1675–76).

Anderson lived at Greyfriars House, Newcastle-upon-Tyne, in Jesmond, and Ryton, County Durham. He was buried at Ryton on 19 July 1679.

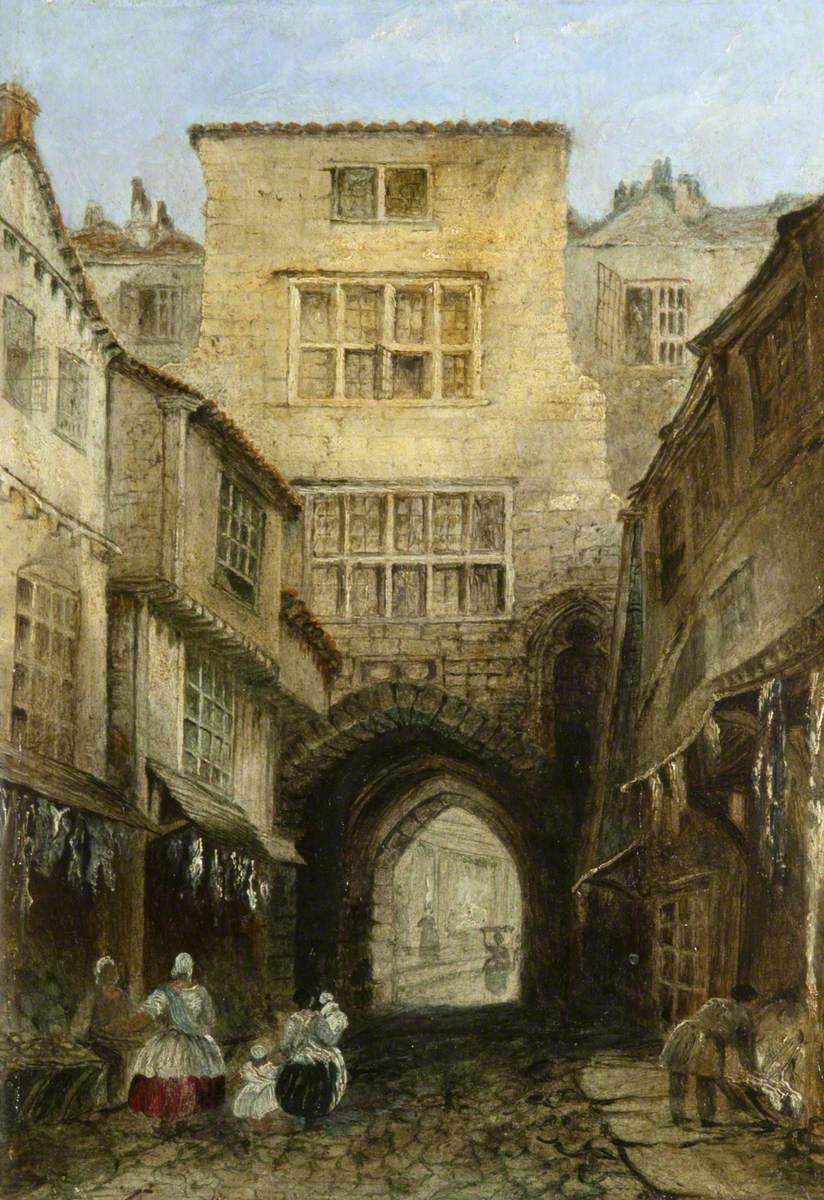
Black Gate, Newcastle-upon-Tyne

== Family ==
In 1636, Anderson married Jane Dent (d. 1673), daughter of John Dent of Barnard Castle, County Durham, and they had seven sons (John, Henry, George, Robert, Francis, Thomas and Roger) and three daughters.

== Arms ==
Coat of arms of Francis Anderson

Notes
The arms of the Andersons of Jesmond and Bradley
Crest
On a chapeau Gules, turned up Ermine, a griffin's head erased Argent, marked on the neck with a link or fetterlock Sable.
Escutcheon
Gules, three oak trees Argent.

== Ancestry ==
Ancestors of Sir Francis Anderson (1614–79)

4. Francis Anderson (d.1623) of Jesmond, Newcastle-upon-Tyne
2. Roger Anderson (d.1622) of Jesmond, Newcastle-upon-Tyne
5. Barbara Nicholson
1. Sir Francis Anderson (1614–79)
6. William Bower alias Jackson of Newcastle-upon-Tyne and Oxen-le-Field, Durham
3. Anne Jackson (d.1620)

Parliament of England
Preceded by Sir Francis Anderson	Member of Parliament for Newcastle upon Tyne; 1661–1679	Succeeded by William Blackett
Preceded by Robert Ellison; William Calverley	Member of Parliament for Newcastle upon Tyne; 1660–1660	Succeeded by Sir Francis Anderson; Sir John Marlay; Sir Robert Slingsby, Bt
Civic offices
Preceded by Thomas Jennison	Mayor of Newcastle-upon-Tyne; 1675–1676	Succeeded by Sir Ralph Carr
Preceded by Sir John Marley	Mayor of Newcastle-upon-Tyne; 1662–1663	Succeeded by Sir James Clavering
Honorary titles
Preceded by Francis Liddell	Sheriff of Newcastle-upon-Tyne; 1641–1642	Succeeded by Henry Maddison
