= John Selby (died 1595) =

English landowner

Sir John Selby of Twizell (died 1595) was an English landowner and official on the Scottish border.

== Career ==
There were several branches of the Selby family in Northumberland.

His home was Twizell Castle in Northumbria. He was Gentleman Porter of Berwick-upon-Tweed, a town on the border between England and Scotland, and depute-warden of the East March.

Selby was a depute to the border warden Lord Grey. In October 1562 he offended Lord Home who complained to the English ambassador in Edinburgh, Thomas Randolph.

In November 1581 Selby sent Thomas Fowler and the Earl of Leicester news of Scottish politics from Berwick. Selby asked Fowler, who was then living in Aldersgate Street in London, to pass his compliments to Roger Aston, an English courtier of James VI of Scotland.

Selby was knighted in 1582. He wrote to Francis Walsingham with Scottish news on 5 May 1588 including the arrival of Lord Maxwell at Dundee, who passed into the country in disguise with "a plaid about him, like a wayfaring man".

In September 1589 the English ambassador in Edinburgh William Ashby asked him to send food for the welcoming party for Anne of Denmark, the new queen of Scotland. He replied that there were no fallow deer or pheasants in his wardenry, only beef and mutton no better than that available in Scotland. In June 1590, Selby as master porter welcomed the Scottish diplomats John Skene and William Stewart to Berwick. They were travelling to London and then to Denmark.

Selby was involved in the rendition of Richard Blithe, a Scottish mariner regarded as a pirate. Blithe had served in a ship that robbed the Master of Orkney and was arrested in Newcastle. James VI wanted to execute him in Leith. In August 1590 the English ambassador in Edinburgh Robert Bowes sent a Spanish prisoner to Selby in exchange. In January 1591 James VI wanted Selby to apprehend John Dickson, who had killed his father, and was living at Horkley near Norham.

In February 1591 he sent a Scottish witch captured in England and imprisoned in Berwick to Edinburgh at the request of James VI. She then accused several other people of witchcraft. This was perhaps "Kennedy the witch of Reydon." James VI sent David Seton of Tranent, who knew the North Berwick witches to England to help round up fugitives. Selby was to have a warrant to return any escaping suspects from the North Berwick Witch Trials.

In May 1594 two fugitives from Edinburgh, Anna of Denmark's jeweller Jacob Kroger and a stable worker Guillaume Martin, who had stolen the queen's jewels were captured at North Shields. John Selby handed them over to John Hume of Hutton Hall, the Scottish depute-warden of the East March, on 11 June 1594, a day of truce, at the west ford of Norham. The two men were taken to Edinburgh and executed.

He died in 1595. An inventory was made of his goods at Twizell and elsewhere.

His heir, and next Gentleman Porter of Berwick, was his son, William Selby (died 1612). His daughter Margaret married George Selby (d. 1625).
