= John Erasmus Blackett =

John Erasmus Blackett (1 January 1729 – 11 June 1814) was a Newcastle upon Tyne businessman and Mayor of Newcastle. He was the father-in-law of Admiral Lord Collingwood, second-in-command to Lord Nelson at the Battle of Trafalgar.

Blackett was born in Newcastle on 1 January 1728/9, a younger son of John Blackett (1683-1750) and Patience Wise, the daughter of Henry Wise, and a grandson of Sir Edward Blackett, 2nd Bt. He was named after a close friend of his father, Erasmus Lewis, secretary to Lord Oxford.

After serving an apprenticeship in Liverpool under major Liverpool slave trader Foster Cunliffe, he became a partner in a Newcastle coal dealership and was for some years Chief Steward of the lead and coal mines of his 2nd cousin Sir Walter Blackett. He was one of the original partners of the Newcastle upon Tyne Fire Office, now part of Aviva plc. He was prominent in Newcastle public life, becoming an Alderman and serving as Mayor four times (in 1765, 1772, 1780 and 1790).

John Erasmus Blackett died in Newcastle on 11 June 1814 and is buried in St. Nicholas's Church. In 1761 he had married Sarah Roddam and in 1791 their daughter Sarah married Cuthbert Collingwood, a Royal Navy officer, who in 1805, as Vice Admiral Collingwood, was second-in-command to Lord Nelson at the Battle of Trafalgar.

Some references state that Blackett Street in the centre of Newcastle was named after him but recent research has cast doubt on that.
