= Twizell Castle =

Castle in Duddo, Northumberland, England

- Northumberland, England, UK
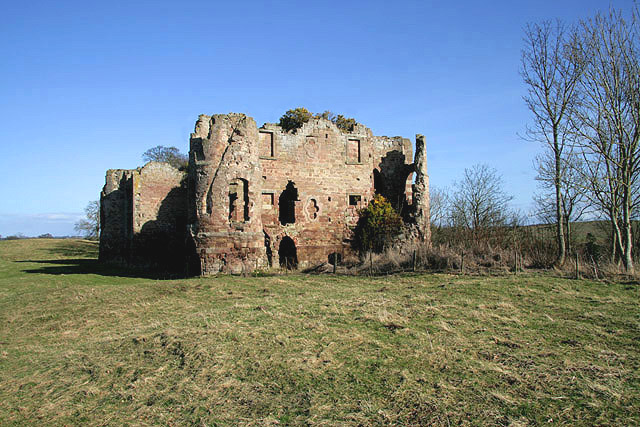
- Twizell Castle

Location
- Location in Northumberland
- Coordinates: 55.683°N 2.188°W
- Grid reference: NT882433

Twizell Castle (also spelt Twizel) is a Grade II* listed building and a Scheduled Ancient Monument which stands on a bend of the River Till at Tillmouth Park, Northumberland, northern England. Below it, the medieval Twizell Bridge spans the river. It is located 10 miles (16 km) south-west of Berwick Upon Tweed. The site is visible from a public footpath, which passes the castle from the road. The gardens of the castle contain the earthwork remains of the deserted medieval village of Twizell, whilst the massive ruin presents the remains of an 18th-century castle which was never completed.

== The Castle ==
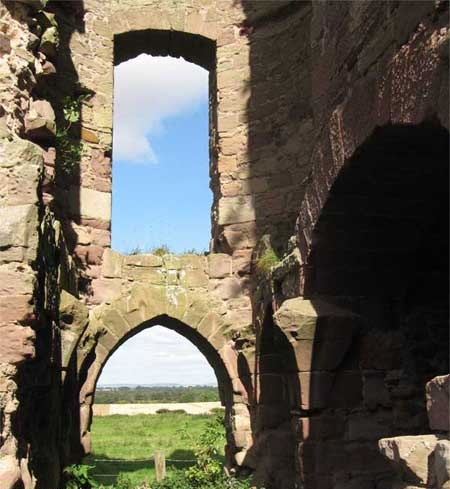
Twizell Castle ruins in 2009.

A medieval tower house which once stood on the site was, in 1415, held by Sir John Heron. This was destroyed by a Scottish army in 1496 commanded by James IV of Scotland and Perkin Warbeck. James IV returned on 24 August 1513 on his way to besiege Norham Castle, and held a council or parliament at "Twesil" or "Twesilhaugh."

The estate was sold by the Herons circa 1520 to a member of the Selby family. A survey in 1561 reported only the remnants of a tower house and a barmkin. John Selby seems to have repaired the buildings, and an inventory was made of the furnishings on his death in 1595 mentioning a new chamber, a gallery, and chambers in the tower. Of the medieval structure, blocked windows, a chamfered doorway and the original north-east angle quoins are all that remains visible now.

In 1685 Sir Francis Blake (d. 1718) purchased the estate from the widow Selby for £1,944, plus an annuity of £100, and the Blake family lived on the estate until 1738 when they moved to nearby Tillmouth Hall.

From about 1770, Sir Francis Blake (d. 1780) worked on the recreation of the castle as a Gothic Revival mansion, designed by architect James Nesbit of Kelso to be five levels tall. Despite some forty years of work, the project was never completed. When in 1882, the Blakes built a new mansion at Tillmouth Park much of the incomplete Twizell Castle was demolished and the stone used in the new construction or sold. The house is now a two-storey folly. Rectangular in plan, with circular towers on the angles and two wings on the north side, the basement rooms in the main block are stone and brick-vaulted as a precaution against fire.

The property is in poor order and is officially listed as of 2008 on the English Heritage Heritage at Risk Register.
