= Selby (name) =

- Pronunciation: /ˈsɛlbi/
- Gender: Unisex
- Language: English

Origin
- Languages: 1. Old Norse; 2. English
- Meaning: From an English surname that was from a place name meaning "willow farm" in Old Norse.
- Region of origin: England

Selby is both a given name and surname.

Notable people with the name include:

== Given name ==
- Selby Ash (1836–1870), English cricketer
- Selby Baqwa, Public Protector of South Africa from 1995 to 2002
- Selby Beeler, female American author
- Selby Burt (1903–1959), Australian cricketer
- Selby Clewer (1917–2001), English architect
- Selby Khumalo (born 1971), South African politician
- Selby Mbenenge (born 1961), South African judge
- Selby McFarlane (1891–1976), Australian rugby league footballer
- Selby Munsie (1870–1938), Australian politician
- Selby Mvusi (1929–1967), South African artist
- Selby Norton (1836–1906), English doctor
- Selby Ripinga (born 1948), South African politician and diplomat
- Selby Wynn Schwartz, American author
- Selby Whittingham (born 1941), Malaysian art expert based in London

== Surname ==
- Selby family, a family that originated in Selby, Yorkshire
- Alan Selby, English-born American gay businessman and leader in the San Francisco leather community
- Andrew Selby (born 1988), Welsh amateur boxer
- Bill Selby (born 1970), American baseball player
- Brit Selby (born 1945), Canadian ice hockey player
- Charles Selby (c. 1802 – 1863), English actor and playwright
- Charles August Selby (1755–1823), English-Danish merchant and landowner
- Cheryl Selby (born 1960), American politician
- Colin Selby (born 1997), American baseball player
- Dale Pierre Selby (1953–1987), executed American murderer
- David Selby (born 1941), American character and stage actor
- David Selby (basketball) (born 1965), Australian wheelchair basketball player
- Daryl Selby (born 1982), English professional squash player
- Donald Selby, American politician
- Erin Selby, Canadian politician and TV personality
- Geoff Selby (1965–1989), Australian rugby league footballer
- George Selby (1557–1625), English politician
- Gertrude Selby (1894–1975), American actress
- Gray Selby, American farmer, teacher, and state legislator
- Guy W. Selby (1871–1968), Michigan politician
- Harry Selby (1913–1984), Scottish politician
- Harry Selby (hunter) (1925–2018), South African big-game hunter
- Hubert Selby Jr. (1928–2004), American writer
- Isaac Selby (1859–1956), Australian lecturer, historian and anti-Catholic campaigner
- Jake Selby (1900–1951), Scottish rugby league footballer
- Jennifer Selby, Canadian religious studies scholar
- John Selby (disambiguation), several people
- Josh Selby (born 1991), American basketball player
- Julian Selby (1833–1907) South Carolina printer and writer
- Kathryn Selby (born 1962), Australian classical pianist
- Ken Selby (1936–2012), American restaurateur and educator
- Lauren Selby (born 1984), English professional squash player
- Lee Selby (born 1987), Welsh professional boxer
- Leif Selby (born 1972), Australian retired lawn bowler
- Lorin Selby, United States Navy rear admiral
- Margo Selby, British textile artist and author
- Marie Selby (1885–1971), American philanthropist
- Mark Selby (disambiguation), several people
- Michael Selby (1936–2018), New Zealand geomorphologist, academic, and university administrator
- Myra C. Selby (born 1955), American judge
- Nicholas Selby (1925–2010), British television and theatre actor
- Paul L. Selby (1924–1999), American lawyer
- Peter Selby (born 1941), Church of England Bishop of Worcester
- Prideaux Selby (1747–1813), English soldier and political figure in Upper Canada
- Prideaux John Selby (1788–1867), English ornithologist, botanist and artist and landowner
- Ralph Selby (1915–1997), British diplomat
- Rob Selby (born 1967), former professional American football player
- Robert of Selby (died 1152), Englishman, courtier of Roger II of Sicily and chancellor of the Kingdom of Sicily
- Sam T. Selby, American football and basketball coach
- Sarah Selby (1905–1980), American actress
- Sidney Selby (1931–2020), American singer and musician known professionally as Guitar Crusher
- Sidney Selby III (born 1997), American rapper known professionally as Desiigner
- Stell Parker Selby, American politician and educator
- Te Paea Selby-Rickit (born 1992), New Zealand netball player
- Thomas Selby (disambiguation), several people
- Tiffany Selby (born 1981), model, Playboy Playmate
- Todd Selby, American photographer, blogger and fashion celebrity
- Tony Selby (1938–2021), English actor
- Vera Selby (1930–2023), English snooker and billiards player
- Sir Walford Selby (1881–1965), British civil servant and diplomat
- Walford Dakin Selby (1845–1889), English archivist and antiquary
- William Selby (disambiguation), several people
- Winnifred Selby, Ghanaian social entrepreneur and the president of the EPF Educational Empowerment Initiative

== See also ==
- Selby (disambiguation)
- Shelby (disambiguation)
