= Kent County Cricket Club =

English cricket club

- One Day name: Kent Spitfires

Personnel
- Captain: Daniel Bell-Drummond
- One Day captain: T20: Sam Billings
- Coach: Adam Hollioake
- Bowling coach: Robbie Joseph
- Chief executive: Michael Wilshaw

Team information
- Founded: 6 December 1870
- Home ground: St Lawrence Ground, Canterbury
- Capacity: 7,000
- Secondary home ground(s): County Cricket Ground, Beckenham

History
- First-class debut: All-England in 1842 at Bromley
- Championship wins: 7 (1 shared)
- One-Day Cup wins: 3
- National League wins: 5
- B&H Cup wins: 3
- Twenty20 Cup wins: 2
- Official website: www.kentcricket.co.uk

First team kit of Kent County Cricket Club

Kent County Cricket Club is one of the eighteen first-class county clubs within the domestic cricket structure of England and Wales, representing the historic county of Kent. A Kent county cricket team has existed since 1709, initially managed by individual patrons and other organisations. Various attempts were made to establish a formal county club, and for many years two such clubs co-existed before merging on 6 December 1870 to form the present club, which is based at the St Lawrence Ground in Canterbury.

Kent has held first-class status since 1864 and has competed in the County Championship since the competition's official inception in 1890. The club has won the County Championship seven times, including one shared title. Four championships were secured between 1906 and 1913, while the remaining three were won during the 1970s, a period in which Kent also enjoyed significant success in one-day cricket. The club's limited overs team is known as the Kent Spitfires, named after the beer brewed by their sponsors Shepherd Neame, which itself is named after the Supermarine Spitfire. Kent has won a total of 13 one-day cricket competitions, including eight between 1967 and 1978. Its most recent trophy was the 2022 Royal London One-Day Cup.

The team plays most of its home matches at the St Lawrence Ground, which hosts Canterbury Cricket Week, the oldest cricket festival in England. Additional home fixtures are played at the County Ground in Beckenham and the Nevill Ground in Royal Tunbridge Wells, which hosts Tunbridge Wells Cricket Week.

The club also fields a women's team. Kent Women have won the Women's County Championship a record eight times, most recently in 2019, and the Women's Twenty20 Cup on three occasions, most recently in 2016. The team traditionally played its home matches at Polo Farm in Canterbury but, since 2016, has been based primarily at Beckenham.

== History ==
Cricket is generally believed to have originated from children's bat-and-ball games in the Weald and the North and South Downs of Kent and Sussex. These counties, along with Surrey, were among the earliest centres of the sport. Records indicate that cricket was played in Kent during the 17th century, although a match in 1705, probably at Town Malling, is the earliest that can be definitely recorded within the county.

=== County team to 1842 ===
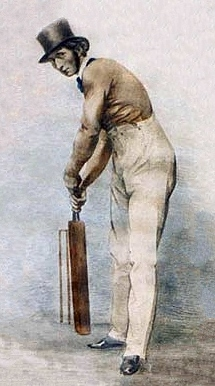
Fuller Pilch, who moved to the Town Malling club in 1835, was the leading English batsman of the period

The earliest known match involving county teams, or teams using county names, was Kent versus Surrey at Dartford Brent on Wednesday, 29 June 1709. However, these early "inter-county matches" were likely inter-parish contests involving villages on either side of the county boundary. Dartford was a prominent club in the first half of the 18th century, and the 1709 match is the earliest known mention of Dartford Brent as a venue. Three matches between Kent and Sussex in 1728 are considered the first properly representative county matches. (Note: Any match listed in the ACS' Important Match Guide (1981) is historically important, and therefore of the highest standard, whether or not a scorecard might exist. The same applies to numerous matches discovered by researchers since 1981. For further information, see First-class cricket.)

Teams under the patronage of landowners such as Edwin Stead of Dartford and Lord John Sackville, who established the Sevenoaks Vine ground on his Knole Park estate, became increasingly representative of Kent as a county. In 1744, a Kent team organised by Sackville played England at the Artillery Ground, a match commemorated in a poem by James Love. Under the patronage of Sackville's son, John Frederick Sackville, 3rd Duke of Dorset, and Sir Horatio Mann, Kent continued to field strong teams throughout the last quarter of the 18th century, emerging, alongside Surrey, as the main challengers to Hampshire teams organised primarily by the Hambledon Club.

In 1787, with Dorset and Mann involved, an attempt was made to form a Kent County Club at Coxheath, near Maidstone, but it failed because the parties could not agree on the location. Inter-county matches declined towards the end of the 18th century, possibly as a result of a lack of investment during the Napoleonic Wars, although Kent teams continued to play matches, including four against England in 1800.

Inter-county matches had not been played since 1796. They resumed in June 1825, when Kent met Sussex at Brighton's Royal New Ground, with a return at Hawkhurst Moor. The fixtures, organised by the Hawkhurst club in Kent and the Brighton in Sussex, were repeated in 1826.

A second attempt to form a county club was made during the 1830s at Town Malling, backed by lawyers Thomas Selby and Silas Norton, alongside George Harris, 3rd Baron Harris. Selby and Norton recruited Fuller Pilch from Norfolk, widely recognised as the best batsman in England, to play at Town Malling and maintain its Old County Ground. Pilch joined a strong county team which included Alfred Mynn, Nicholas Felix, Ned Wenman, and William Hillyer. Harry Altham considered this team to be a match for the Rest of England. In a "sensational" match at Town Malling in 1739, Kent defeated England by 2 runs. At Lord's in 1841, Kent defeated them again, this time by 70 runs. Despite success on the field, the club folded in 1841 because a small town like Malling could not afford the expense of running county matches. Pilch moved to the Beverley club at Canterbury.

=== The first county clubs: 1842–1870 ===
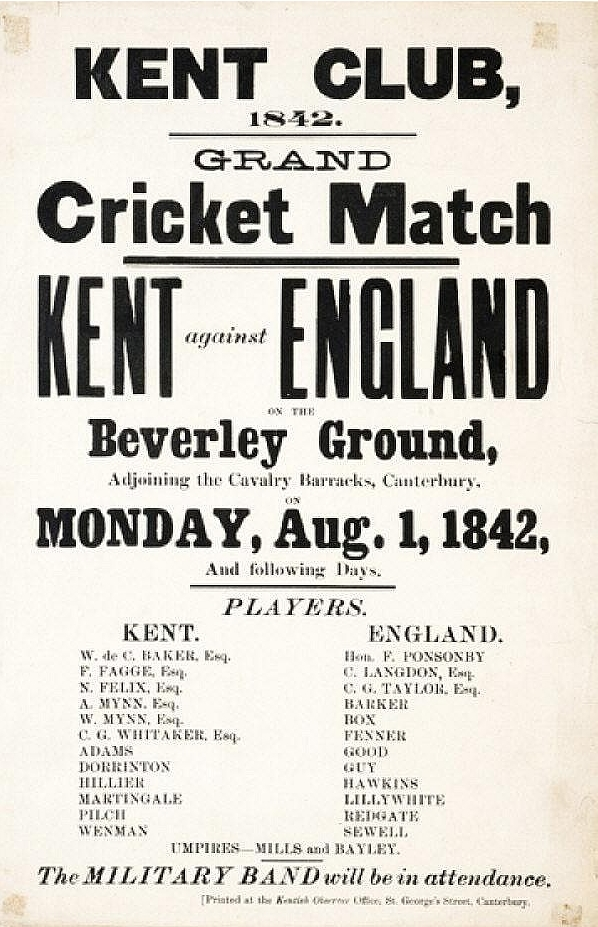
Poster for an 1842 match between Kent and an England XI immediately before the foundation of the Kent County Club

The early history of Kent County Cricket Club is complicated. In 1842, a county club was formed by Canterbury's Beverley club, and then a second one was created at Maidstone in 1859. These co-existed until 1870 when they merged to form the present-day Kent County Cricket Club. Playfair Cricket Annual holds that the "present club" was founded on 1 March 1859 (i.e., the Maidstone one), and that there was then a "substantial reorganisation" on 6 December 1870, although the "inaugural first-class match" was played in 1864.

Beverley Cricket Club was formed in 1835 on the Canterbury estate of brothers John and William de Chair Baker, initially playing in the St Stephen's district of the city before moving to the Beverley Ground in 1839. After the failure of the Town Malling club, the Bakers stepped in to organise county matches, with Pilch hired as both player and ground manager. The Beverley club became the Kent Cricket Club on 6 August 1842, when it reconstituted itself during its annual cricket festival. The club was the first formal incarnation of Kent County Cricket Club, and the 1842 cricket festival may have been the first Canterbury Cricket Week proper—a cricket festival had been organised by the Beverley Club since 1839.

The new Kent club played its first match against England at White Hart Field in Bromley on 25–27 August 1842, and the team's success continued until 1850. The club moved to the St Lawrence Ground on the eastern side of Canterbury in 1847, with Pilch once again moving to manage the ground. This was later established as the county's formal headquarters, although Kent continued to play matches on a variety of grounds around the county until well into the 20th century, rarely using the St Lawrence Ground for more than two or three matches a year.

As the team built around Pilch retired from cricket, the fortunes of the club declined, and it was sometimes forced to field teams of up to 16. Also, it was sometimes necessary to combine with local club teams from Canterbury itself, and from neighbouring towns like Whitstable, Faversham, or Ashford. Financial difficulties followed, and on 1 March 1859 a second county club was formed at Maidstone, ostensibly to support the Canterbury-based club.

These two clubs, the Canterbury club known as East Kent, the Maidstone club as West Kent, co-operated to some extent, although the relationship was later described as "anything but satisfactory". The standard of cricket played by the county team, generally organised by the West Kent club, remained poor, and the county found it difficult to attract either the best amateur players or professionals to play. Many amateurs were only willing to appear during Canterbury Week. Ultimately, an 1870 meeting, chaired by the 3rd Lord Harris at the Bull Inn in Rochester, saw the two clubs merge to form the present-day Kent County Cricket Club.

=== A single county club: 1870–1914 ===
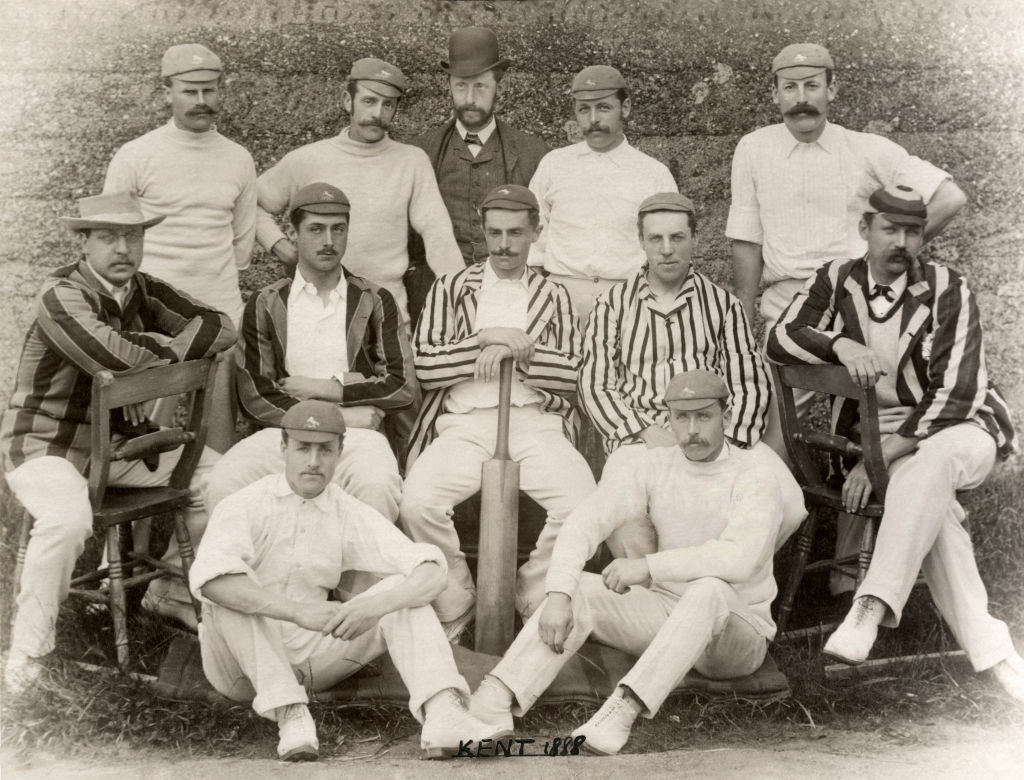
The Kent team of 1888

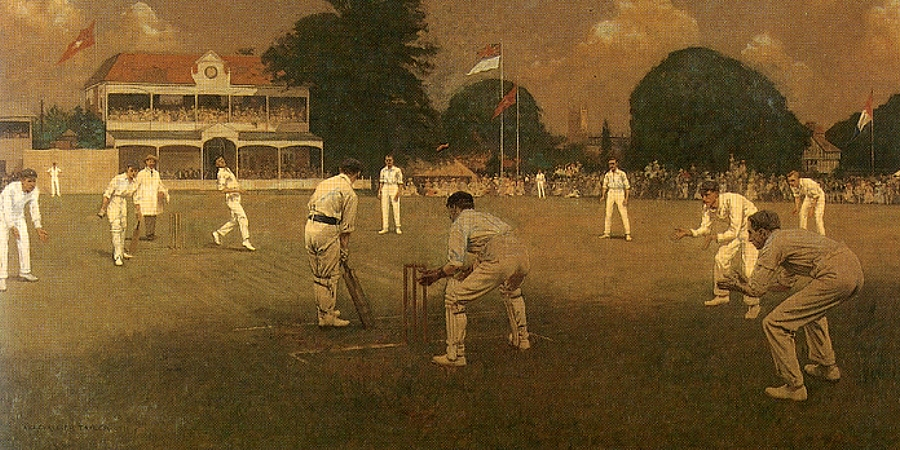
Kent vs Lancashire at Canterbury by Albert Chevallier Tayler, which was commissioned by Kent to celebrate their 1906 County Championship victory

Initially, the amalgamation of the clubs did not lead to improve on-field performance. Leading amateur players continued to appear only infrequently, and Kent lacked a consistent group of skilled professionals capable of providing a stable foundation for the team. The 4th Lord Harris was elected to the General Committee in 1870 and assumed the roles of captain and secretary in 1876, at which point he initiated a programme of reform characterised by what contemporaries described as an "energetic administration". Despite these efforts, progress was gradual, and when the County Championship was formerly established in 1890, Kent finished only in mid-table positions.

A significant turning point came with the establishment of the Tonbridge Nursery in 1897, which functioned as a dedicated player development centre for young professional cricketers and proved central to laying the foundations for Kent's pre-war successes. The Nursery was managed by Captain William McCanlis and was established and supervised by Tom Pawley who became the club's general manager in 1898. For the first time, Kent implemented a systematic approach to identifying, coaching and providing regular match practice for young professionals. As a result, a new generation of players emerged, gradually replacing the amateur dominance that had characterised Kent teams in the 1870s and 1880s.

By 1906, approximately 60% of all first-team appearances were made by professional players. Bowlers such as Colin Blythe and Arthur Fielder formed the core of Kent's bowling attack, but professional batsmen including Punter Humphreys and James Seymour, along with all-rounders such as Frank Woolley, played an increasingly important role in the teams's success. Together with a smaller group of highly capable amateurs, these players contributed to the development of consistently strong batting line-ups.

This Kent team was the first since the 1840s to enjoy a period of real success, winning the County Championship four times in the years between 1906 and 1914. The first title, in 1906, came under the captaincy of Cloudesley Marsham and was won on the last day of the season. Teams captained by Ted Dillon won three further Championships in 1909, 1910, and 1913. The Kent XI was strong throughout the pre-war period. Blythe was the team's leading bowler throughout the period, taking over 100 wickets each season between 1902 and 1914, including seventeen in one day against Northamptonshire in 1907.

=== Consistency, but no Championships: 1919–1939 ===
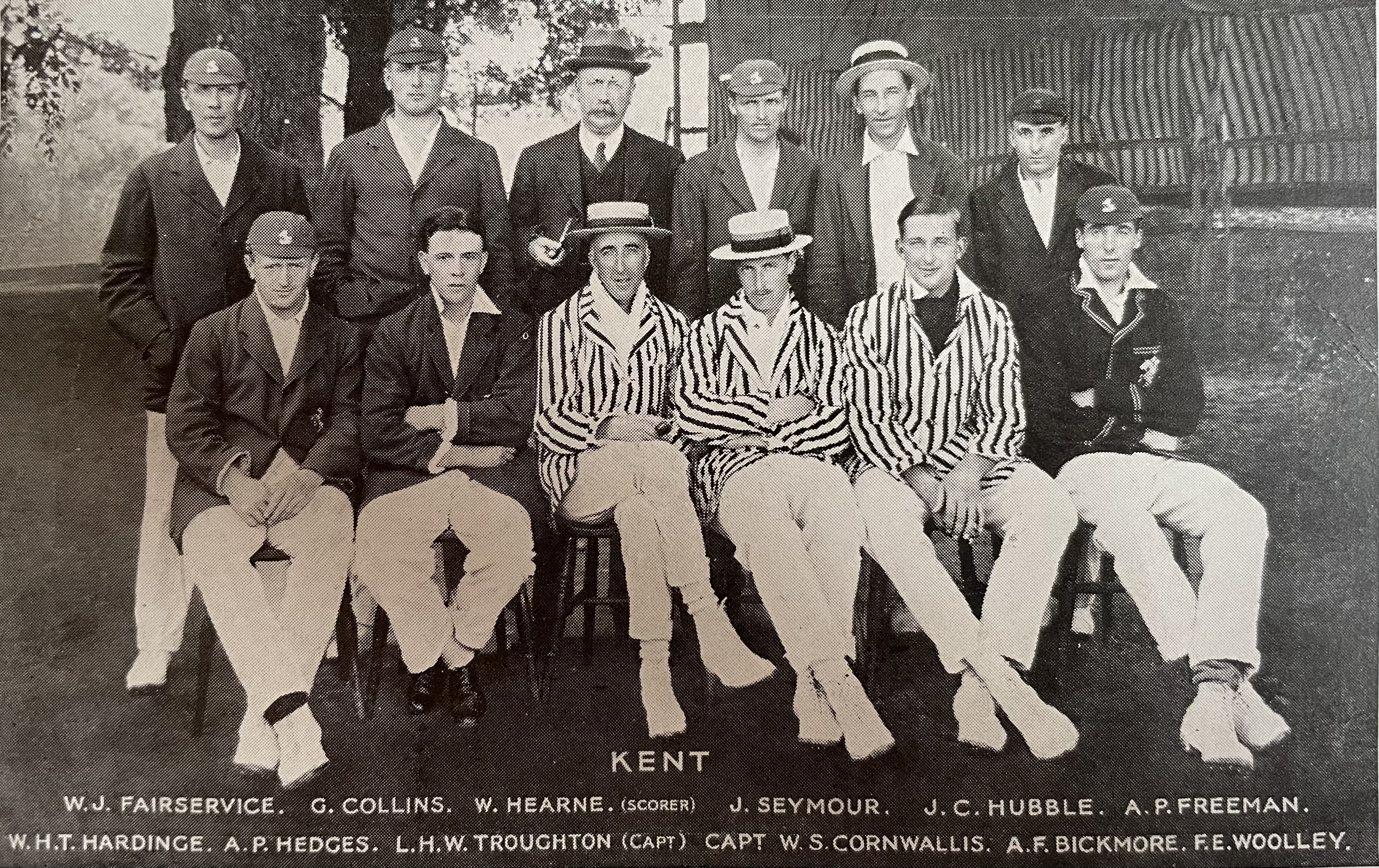
Kent team, c.1922, including Tich Freeman and Frank Woolley

Blythe died at Paschendaele in 1917, although it is unlikely he would have played county cricket once the war was over. The Kent team continued to be consistently strong throughout the inter-war period, finishing in the top five of the County Championship table in all but one season between 1919 and 1934. Players such as Woolley, Wally Hardinge, and Les Ames all played at the peak of their careers, and Blythe was succeeded by Tich Freeman. Freeman took 102 wickets for Kent in 1920, and then took at least 100 each season until 1936, taking 262 in 1933. He took 3,340 wickets in his career—a record for Kent.

Kent scored 803 for 4 declared against Essex at Brentwood in 1934, with Bill Ashdown scoring 332, Ames 202 not out, and Woolley 172. The innings lasted just seven hours, with 623 runs scored on the first day alone. The total remains, as of 2026, Kent's highest in first-class cricket, and Ashdown's 332 is still the highest individual score for Kent.

Arthur Fagg scored a unique two double centuries in the same match for Kent against Essex at Colchester in 1938. Woolley scored over 1,000 runs for Kent in each season between 1920 and his retirement in 1938. In 1928, he made 2,894 runs for the county at a batting average of 59.06. He retired in 1938 after making 764 appearances for Kent. He created three county records: 47,868 runs, 122 centuries, and 773 catches.

=== Post-war rebuilding, and the Second Golden Age: 1946–1978 ===
Gerry Chalk captained the team in 1939 when they again finished in the top five of the Championship, but the post-war period saw Kent struggle to compete consistently. After two promising seasons under Bryan Valentine in 1946 and 1947, the county only finished in the top nine teams twice between 1948 and 1963.

The rebuilding of the team continued under David Clark's captaincy. Doug Wright, appointed in 1956, was Kent's first professional captain. He took over 2,000 wickets with his leg breaks and googlies between 1932 and 1957, and is the only player to take seven first-class hat-tricks—six of them for Kent. Following his retirement in 1957, he was succeeded as captain by Colin Cowdrey, the first man to play 100 Test matches.

An improvement in performances began in the mid-1960s under the captaincy of Cowdrey, and the management of former wicket-keeper Les Ames. Kent made their List A debut in the 1963 Gillette Cup tournament. In the first round they lost to Sussex by 72 runs at the Nevill Ground in Royal Tunbridge Wells (Sussex went on to win the tournament). In the County Championship, a seventh-place finish in 1964 was followed by fifth-place in 1965, and fourth-place in 1966. The county finished as runners-up in 1967, winning the Gillette Cup in the same season. They were second again in 1968.

The team enjoyed success in the 1970s by winning ten trophies. In 1970, Kent won their first County Championship title since 1913. They shared the title with Middlesex in 1977, and then won it outright again in 1978. Between 1972 and 1978, Kent won seven limited overs tournaments. Six of the trophies—between 1972 and 1976—were won under the captaincy of Mike Denness, who had succeeded Cowdrey before the 1972 season.

=== Recent history ===
After no trophies during the 1980s, Kent won the 1995 Axa Equity & Law League, and the 2001 Norwich Union League.

Calling themselves the Kent Spitfires, the team made its Twenty20 Cup debut on 16 June 2003, playing against Hampshire Hawks in a South Group match at the County Ground in Beckenham. Kent won by 6 wickets. In August 2007, they won the Twenty20 Cup for the first time, defeating Gloucestershire in the final by four wickets with just three balls to spare, with Ryan McLaren taking a hat-trick in the Gloucestershire innings. In 2021, the team won their first trophy for 14 years, beating Somerset in the T20 Blast final. The following season they were victorious in the domestic List A competition, beating Lancashire to win the 2022 One-Day Cup.

Kent have had mixed fortunes in the County Championship since the two-division format was introduced in 2000. They were in Division One until they were relegated to Division Two in 2008. They were promoted in 2009, but were immediately relegated again after the 2010 season. This time, they stayed in the Second Division until 2018. They did finish second in 2016, but were denied promotion because of a league restructure. Kent were promoted as 2018 runners-up, and stayed in the top division until 2024. At that point, there was a downturn in the team's fortunes. They finished bottom of Division One, and then finished bottom of Division Two in 2025. However, in a distinct change of fortunes they finished runners up to Durham at the end of the 2026 season and were promoted to Division One. In December 2014, the county club merged with the Kent Cricket Board to form Kent Cricket. This was the first such merger in English cricket. Its purpose was to have "a single body for the development of all cricket from grassroots to elite level".

In November 2016, Kent accepted an invitation from the West Indies Cricket Board to compete in the 2016–17 Regional Super50 domestic List A tournament in January and February 2017. This was the first time that any English county team had competed in an overseas domestic competition. It was followed by an invitation to take part in the competition again in 2018.

== Grounds ==
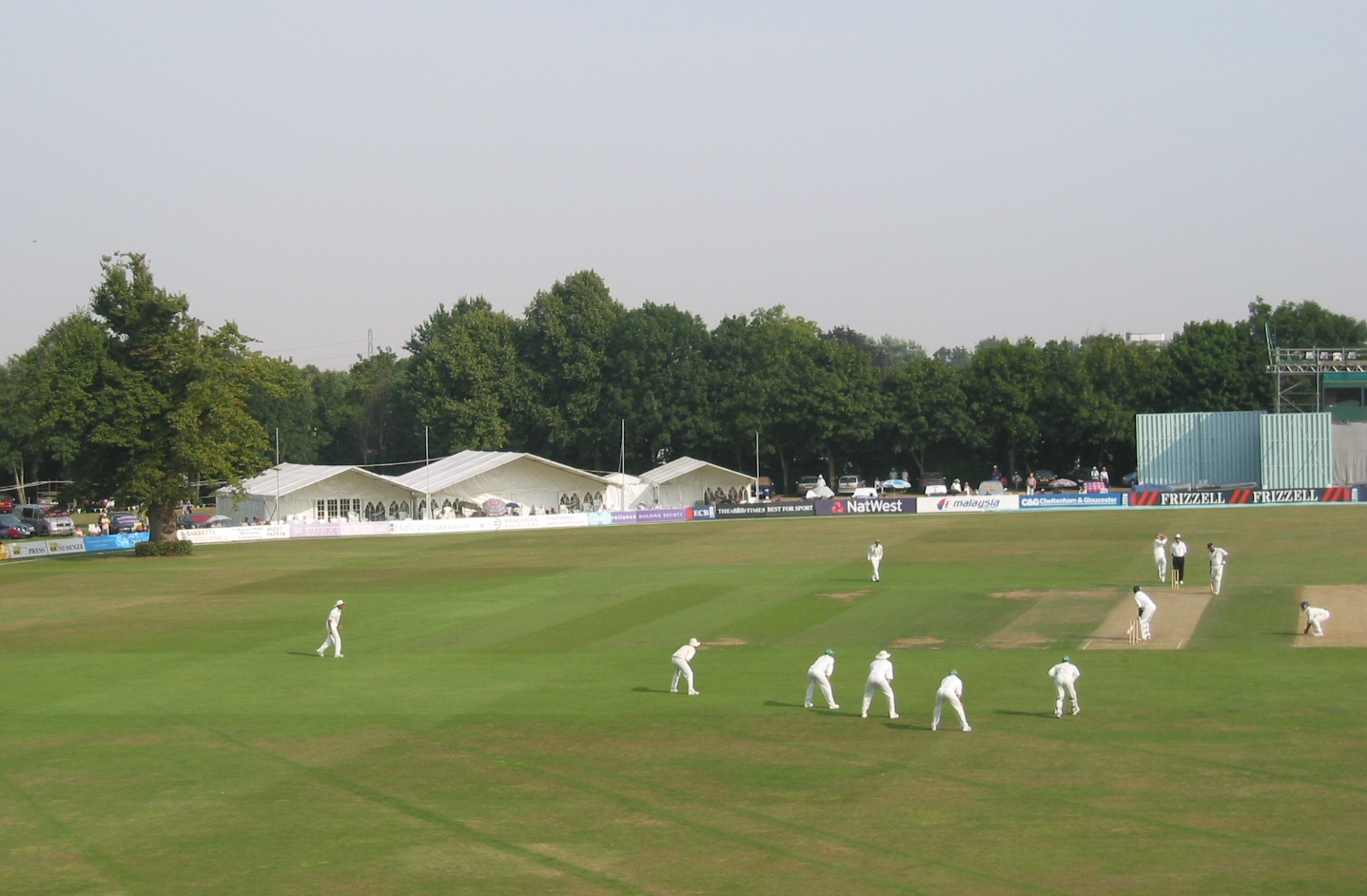
Kent v South Africans at the St Lawrence Ground in 2003, showing the old lime tree

Kent's main ground is the St Lawrence Ground in Canterbury. This ground has been used by the club since 1847, and Kent have played over 500 matches there. It is famous for having a tree, the St Lawrence Lime on the playing field. The original tree, around which the ground was built, was broken in two by high winds in January 2005 and replaced by a smaller replacement lime tree later in the same year. The ground hosts the annual Canterbury Cricket Week, the oldest cricket festival in the world, which has been held there since at least 1842, although a similar festival week was first held in 1839 by the Beverley club.

The original Kent club (Beverley) played its first official match at White Hart Field in Bromley in August 1842. Since then, they have used 29 different grounds within the historic county (some of the grounds, although in the historic county of Kent, are now in Greater London). One outground remains in regular use, the redeveloped County Ground in Beckenham. The Nevill Ground in Royal Tunbridge Wells was last used by the club in 2019, having hosted Tunbridge Wells Cricket Week, and been the venue for over 200 matches. Another former venue was Mote Park in Maidstone, which was used until 2005, and had staged over 200 matches. Among other grounds used for County Championship matches were the Bat and Ball Ground in Gravesend, the Angel Ground in Tonbridge, the Crabble Athletic Ground in Dover, and Cheriton Road in Folkestone.

The club's main offices are based at the St Lawrence Ground. Indoor cricket schools are in place at both this ground and at Beckenham, which acts as a centre of excellence for player development in the west of the county.

== Players ==
=== Current squad ===
- No. denotes the player's squad number, as worn on the back of their shirt.
- ‡ denotes players with international caps.
- * denotes a player who has been awarded a county cap.

No.	Name	Nationality	Birth date	Batting style	Bowling style	Notes
Batters
2	Ben Compton*	England	29 March 1994 (age 32)	Left-handed	Right-arm off break	
5	Ekansh Singh	England	16 July 2006 (age 20)	Right-handed	Right-arm medium	
14	Tawanda Muyeye	Zimbabwe	5 March 2001 (age 25)	Right-handed	Right-arm off break	Domestic qualified
16	Zak Crawley* ‡	England	3 February 1998 (age 28)	Right-handed	Right-arm medium	
17	Sam Northeast*	England	16 October 1989 (age 36)	Right-handed	Right-arm off break	
23	Daniel Bell-Drummond*	England	3 August 1993 (age 33)	Right-handed	Right-arm medium	Club Captain
All-rounders
9	Grant Stewart ‡	Italy	19 February 1994 (age 32)	Right-handed	Right-arm fast-medium	
22	Corey Flintoff	England	8 March 2006 (age 20)	Right-handed	Right-arm fast-medium	
24	Olly Curtiss	England	22 September 2006 (age 20)	Right-handed	Right-arm fast-medium	
42	Jaydn Denly	England	5 January 2006 (age 20)	Left-handed	Slow left-arm orthodox	
Wicket-keepers
7	Sam Billings* ‡	England	15 June 1991 (age 35)	Right-handed	—	White ball contract; Captain (T20)
12	Chris Benjamin	South Africa	29 April 1999 (age 27)	Right-handed	—	UK passport
15	Ben Dawkins	England	19 October 2006 (age 19)	Right-handed	—	
72	Harry Finch	England	10 February 1995 (age 31)	Right-handed	Right-arm medium	
Bowlers
8	Matt Milnes*	England	29 July 1994 (age 32)	Right-handed	Right-arm fast-medium	
18	Fred Klaassen ‡	Netherlands	13 November 1992 (age 33)	Right-handed	Left-arm fast-medium	White ball contract
19	Jas Singh	England	19 September 2002 (age 24)	Right-handed	Right-arm fast-medium	
28	Matt Parkinson ‡	England	24 October 1996 (age 29)	Right-handed	Right-arm leg break	
64	Matt Quinn	New Zealand	28 February 1993 (age 33)	Right-handed	Right-arm fast-medium	UK passport
Source: Updated: 27 September 2026

=== Former players ===
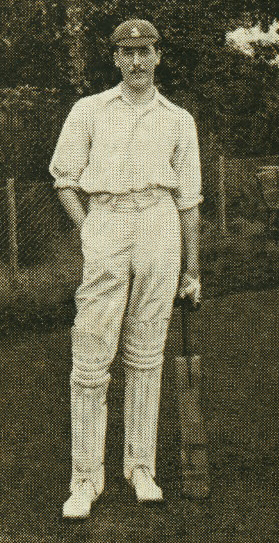
Frank Woolley, who made his Kent debut in 1906, and holds the record for the number of runs scored and appearances made for the county

Les Ames, Colin Cowdrey, Alan Knott, Derek Underwood, and Frank Woolley all have stands named after them at the St Lawrence Ground. The ground also has a memorial dedicated to Colin Blythe. Other great players at Kent have been Tich Freeman and Godfrey Evans.

=== Captains ===
The first player to be formally appointed as club captain was Lord Harris in 1876. Ted Dillon led the county to the County Championship title three times, the only man to captain Kent to more than one championship title. Colin Cowdrey captained the team for the longest span in the County Championship era, serving between 1957 and 1971. Mike Denness' team of the early 1970s won six one-day titles in his five years as captain.

Daniel Bell-Drummond is the current club captain. He was appointed in October 2023, replacing Sam Billings who resigned following the end of the 2023 season.

== Coaching staff ==
Adam Hollioake was appointed as Kent's head coach in December 2024, replacing Matt Walker who resigned at the end of the 2024 season, after Kent were relegated. Under Walker's leadership, the team had won promotion to Division One, and had won both the 2021 Vitality Blast and 2022 One-Day Cup. In Hollioake's first season, 2025, Kent finished bottom of Division Two.

The team's bowling coach until September 2023 was Simon Cook, another past player who was appointed as the club's Directors of Cricket, replacing Paul Downton. He was replaced by Robbie Joseph, a former fast bowler who took 230 wickets for the county, and had previously worked as the bowling coach at Gloucestershire. At the same time, Toby Radford was appointed as the club's batting coach, replacing Alex Gidman who had left after a single season, moving to become an assistant coach with the England women's cricket team.

The Head of Talent Pathway in charge of the development of young cricketers at the club is former Second XI coach and player Min Patel. He works alongside Mark Dekker, who had previously coached Kent Women and coaches the county's Second XI. In October 2025, the club announced its former all-rounder Darren Stevens would join the coaching squad as a bowling consultant.

== Kent Women ==
Kent Women play in the Women's London Championship and the Women's Twenty20 Cup, usually on either the St Lawrence Ground or the County Ground in Beckenham. The first recorded match by a Kent Women's team was in May 1935, and they first appeared in the Women's Area Championship in 1980. The team is sponsored by Canterbury Christ Church University.

They won the Women's County Championship a record eight times during its existence (1997–2019), including the final tournament in 2019. Kent Women's outstanding player was England Women captain Charlotte Edwards, who played for them from 2000 to 2016. They have also won the Women's Twenty20 Cup three times, most recently in 2016.

== Gentlemen of Kent ==
The Gentlemen of Kent, a team which mostly consisted of amateurs played in some 48 matches between 1830 and 1880. Their opponents tended to be MCC, the Gentlemen of England, and I Zingari. One of these matches was usually played in the Canterbury Cricket Week between 1842 and 1866. They also played against the touring Australian aboriginals in 1868. The team was closely associated with the county club, and had strong links to other teams, including I Zingari and Band of Brothers, both of which would host tents during Canterbury Week, as well as to Old Stagers, an amateur drama group which performed during Canterbury Week.

There had been matches involving teams with this name in the 18th century. The earliest known is a 1771 match against Gentlemen of Sussex on the White Lion Field in Tenterden. They also played MCC in 1791.

== Kent Cricket Academy ==
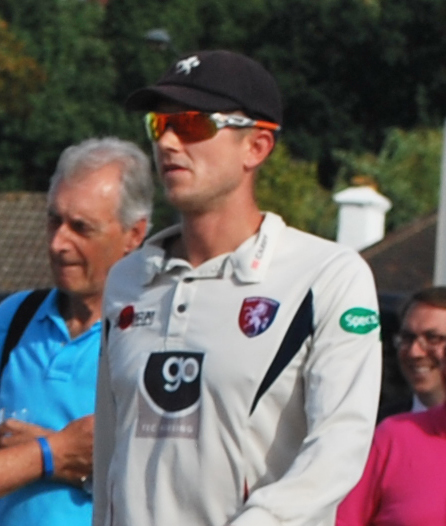
Joe Denly, seen playing for Kent in 2016, is a graduate of the Kent Cricket Academy

Kent established an academy in 2003, with former wicket-keeper Simon Willis as its first director. Its aim is the development of future cricketers, and it is based at the St Lawrence Ground where it makes use of the Ames-Levett Sports Centre. The academy has produced 25 first-team players for the county, including England internationals Tammy Beaumont, Sam Billings, Joe Denly, and Lydia Greenway.

== Honours ==
=== First XI honours ===
- County Championship (6) – 1906, 1909, 1910, 1913, 1970, 1978; shared (1) – 1977
  Runners-up (12): 1988, 1908, 1911, 1919, 1928, 1967, 1968, 1972, 1988, 1992, 1997, 2004
  County Championship Division Two (1) – 2009
  Runners-up (2): 2016, 2018
- County Championship Division Three (1) – 2021 (Note: 2021 is the only time the County Championship has used three divisions. It was reorganised because of the COVID-19 pandemic.)
- One-Day Cup (3) – 1967, 1974, 2022
  Runners-up (5): 1971, 1983, 1984, 2008, 2018
- National League (5) – 1972, 1973, 1976, 1995, 2001
  Runners-up (4): 1970, 1979, 1993, 1997
- Benson & Hedges Cup (3) – 1973, 1976, 1978
  Runners-up (5): 1977, 1986, 1992, 1995, 1997
- Twenty20 Cup (2) – 2007, 2021
  Runners-up (1): 2008

=== Second XI honours ===
- Minor Counties Championship (2) – 1951, 1956
- Second XI Championship (8) – 1961, 1969, 1970, 1976, 2002, 2005, 2006, 2012; shared (1) – 1987
- Second XI Trophy (2) – 2002, 2019

=== Women's honours ===
- Women's County Championship (8) – 2006, 2007, 2009, 2011, 2012, 2014, 2016, 2019
  Runners-up (5) – 2004, 2005, 2008, 2010, 2015
- Women's County Twenty20 Championship (3) – 2011, 2013, 2016

== Bibliography ==
- ACS (1981). A Guide to Important Cricket Matches Played in the British Isles 1709–1863. Nottingham: ACS. OCLC 85045528.
- Altham, H. S.; Swanton, E. W. (1962). A History of Cricket, Volume 1 (to 1914) (5th ed.). London: George Allen & Unwin. OCLC 894274808.
- Barclays (1986). Swanton, E. W.; Plumptre, George; Woodcock, John (eds.). Barclays World of Cricket. London: HarperCollins. ISBN 978-00-02181-93-8.
- Birley, Derek (1999). A Social History of English Cricket. London: Aurum Press. ISBN 978-18-54107-10-7 – via Internet Archive.
- Buckley, G. B. (1937). Fresh Light on pre-Victorian Cricket. Birmingham: Cotterell & Co. OCLC 23469107.
- Carlaw, Derek (2020). Kent County Cricketers, A to Z: Part One (1806–1914) (PDF). Cardiff: ACS.
- Hignell, Andrew (2002). Rain Stops Play: Cricketing Climates. London: Abingdon Press. ISBN 978-07-14651-73-6.
- Lewis, Paul (2014). For Kent and Country. Eastbourne: Reveille Press. ISBN 978-19-08336-63-7.
- McCann, Tim (2004). Sussex Cricket in the Eighteenth Century (PDF). Vol. 88. Lewes: West Sussex Record Office. ISBN 978-08-54450-55-8.
- Milton, Howard (1992). Cricket Grounds of Kent. Nottingham: ACS. OCLC 949280131.
- Milton, Howard; Francis, Peter (2020). Kent County Cricket Grounds. Worthing: Pitch Publishing. ISBN 978-17-85316-61-6.
- Moore, Dudley (1998). The History of Kent County Cricket Club. London: Christopher Helm. ISBN 978-07-47022-09-1.
- Moseling, Martin; Quarrington, Tony (2013). A Half-Forgotten Triumph: The story of Kent's County Championship title of 1913. York: SportsBooks Limited. ISBN 978-19-07524-40-0.
- Playfair (2025). Marshall, Ian (ed.). Playfair Cricket Annual. Headline. ISBN 978-1-0354-1179-5.
- Rice, Jonathan (2019). Stories of Cricket's Finest Painting. Worthing: Pitch Publishing. ISBN 978-17-85315-05-3.
- Scoble, Christopher (2005). Colin Blythe: Lament for a Legend. York: SportsBooks Limited. ISBN 978-18-99807-31-4.
- Underdown, David (2000). Start of Play. Westminster: Allen Lane. ISBN 978-07-13993-30-1 – via Internet Archive.
