= Selby (disambiguation) =

Selby is a town in Yorkshire, England.

Selby may also refer to:

== Placenames ==
=== Australia ===
- Selby, Victoria, an outer eastern suburb of Melbourne, Victoria

=== Canada ===
- Selby, Ontario

=== South Africa ===
- Selby, Johannesburg, a suburb of Johannesburg, South Africa

=== United Kingdom ===
- Selby District, a former local government district of North Yorkshire
- Selby (UK Parliament constituency), a former constituency represented in the House of Commons of the Parliament of the United Kingdom

=== United States ===
- Selby, California, an unincorporated village in Contra Costa County
- Selby, South Dakota
- Selby Township, Bureau County, Illinois
- Selby-on-the-Bay, Maryland

== Titles ==
- Selby baronets
- Selby-Bigge baronets
- Viscount Selby

== Fiction ==
- Selby (comics), a mutant character in the Marvel Comics Universe
- De Selby, fictional philosopher
- Doug Selby, fictional creation of Erle Stanley Gardner
- Jay Selby, a recurring character played by Tommy Hinkley in the first season of the sitcom Mad About You
- Selby the Talking Dog
- Selby (novel series), novel series by Duncan Ball featuring Selby the Talking Dog

== See also ==
- Selby (name)
- Shelby (disambiguation)
