= Farmers' Folly =

Farmers' Folly may refer to:

- The Tenantry Column in Alnwick, England, which was built by local farmers
- Penshaw Monument in Sunderland, England, which an apocryphal story says was built by local farmers
