= William Selby (disambiguation) =

William Selby (1738-1798) was an English composer and organist.

William Selby may also refer to:

- William Selby (died c.1426), MP for City of York
- William Selby (died 1612), MP for Berwick-upon-Tweed
- William Selby (died 1613), MP for Newcastle-upon-Tyne (UK Parliament constituency)
- William Selby (died 1638), MP for Northumberland
- William Selby (died 1649), MP for Northumberland (UK Parliament constituency)
- William Selby (cricketer) (died 1892), English cricketer
- Bill Selby (born 1970), American baseball player
- Various members of the English Selby family
- William Shelbye, sometimes referred to as William Selby (died 1584), English organist and composer
