= Frank Woolley =

English cricketer (1887–1978)

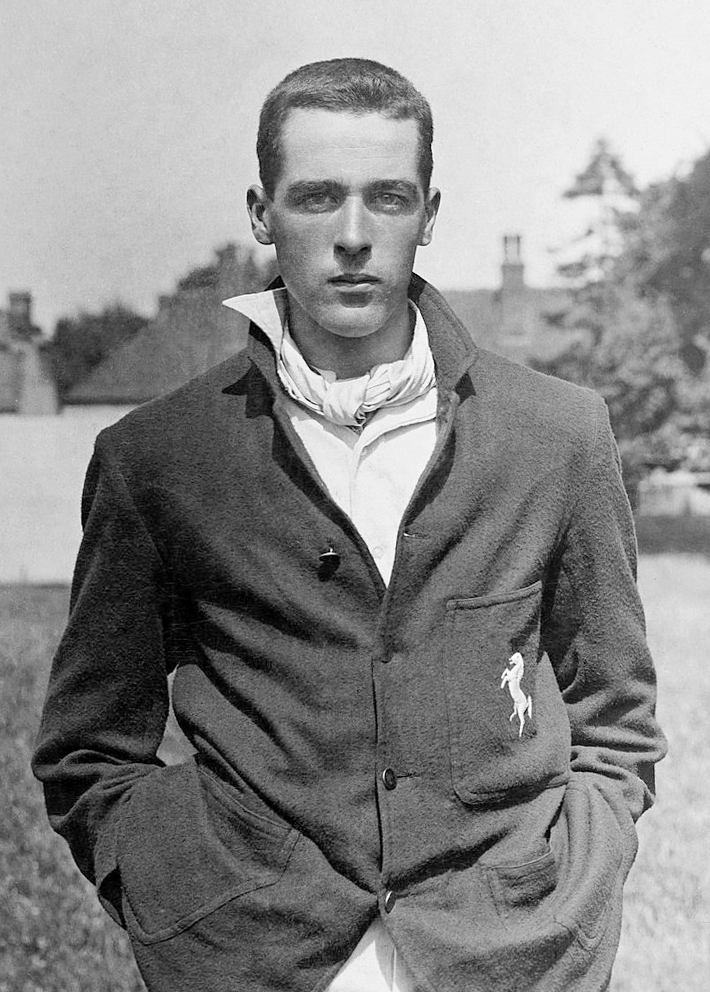
- A youthful Frank Woolley

Personal information
- Full name: Frank Edward Woolley
- Born: 27 May 1887; Tonbridge, Kent
- Died: 18 October 1978 (aged 91); Chester, Nova Scotia, Canada
- Height: 6 ft 3 in (1.91 m)
- Batting: Left-handed
- Bowling: Left-arm medium Slow left-arm orthodox
- Role: All-rounder
- Relatives: Claud Woolley (brother)

International information
- National side: England
- Test debut (cap 163): 9 August 1909 v Australia
- Last Test: 22 August 1934 v Australia

Domestic team information
- Years: Team
- 1906–1938: Kent

Career statistics
Competition	Test	FC
Matches	64	978
Runs scored	3,283	58,959
Batting average	36.07	40.77
100s/50s	5/23	145/295
Top score	154	305*
Balls bowled	6,495	94,794
Wickets	83	2,066
Bowling average	33.91	19.87
5 wickets in innings	4	132
10 wickets in match	1	28
Best bowling	7/76	8/22
Catches/stumpings	64/–	1,018/–
- Source: CricketArchive, 24 June 2026

Frank Edward Woolley (27 May 1887 – 18 October 1978) was an English professional cricketer who is widely regarded as one of the greatest all-rounders in the sport's history. He played for Kent County Cricket Club from 1906 to 1938, and represented England in 64 Test matches.

Woolley was a left-handed batsman and left-arm bowler who varied his pace and style between medium pace and slow left-arm orthodox. He was an outstanding close-in fielder, and remains the only non-wicket-keeper to have held more than 1,000 catches in a first-class career. Woolley was named Wisden Cricketer of the Year in 1911 and was inducted into the ICC Cricket Hall of Fame in 2009.

== Early life ==
Woolley was born in Tonbridge, Kent, in 1887, the youngest of four brothers. He was born in the family home at 72 High Street, which also included his father Charles's workshop and showroom. Having inherited a cleaning and dyeing business from his own father, Charles developed Woolley's Cycle and Engine Works, which made and repaired bicycles and, later, motor cars. Charles had originally trained as an engineer at a railway works in Ashford, where he met and married his wife, Louise Lewis, the daughter of the works' owner.

The family business was located close to the Angel Ground, the home of Tonbridge Cricket Club and a venue used annually by Kent County Cricket Club for festival matches. In 1899, the ground became the base for the Tonbridge Nursery, a training centre established to develop young professional cricketers for Kent. Players trained at the Nursery formed the core of Kent's four County Championship-winning teams during the early years of Woolley's career.

Woolley developed an interest in cricket at an early age. He played informally with his brothers behind his father's workshop and watched matches at the Angel Ground from a tree overlooking the field. He was also a keen association footballer, playing for Tonbridge and later signing for Tunbridge Wells Rangers F.C. in 1906. By the time Woolley reached his teenage years, his father's business had been developed into a motor vehicle garage and was prospering, allowing Woolley the opportunity to attend the fee-paying Tonbridge School.

His cricketing ability attracted attention as he assisted as a fielder during practice matches at the Angel Ground. This led to him being invited to play in a match to make up numbers by Tom Pawley, Kent's manager. Woolley did not regard himself as academically inclined and declined a place at Tonbridge School, instead leaving formal education at the age of 14.

== Cricket career ==
=== Engaged by Kent ===
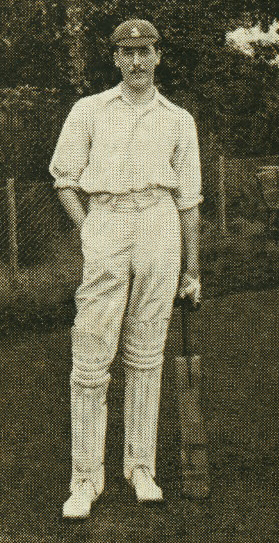
Woolley pictured in 1912.

In 1903, when he was 16, Woolley was formally engaged as a young professional by Kent, and trained full time at the Tonbridge Nursery under William McCanlis during the cricket season. His brother Claud, who went on to play for Northamptonshire, joined the Nursery around the same time. Woolley soon impressed McCanlis and the other Nursery coaches. In 1905, he made his Kent Second XI debut against Surrey Second XI at The Oval. As Nursery professionals were made available to clubs upon request, Woolley played for a variety of teams during the season, scoring 960 runs and taking 115 wickets.

Woolley met the Tonbridge cricketer Colin Blythe, who became his mentor. Blythe bowled slow left-arm spin, the same style later adopted by Woolley. Blythe, who had been Woolley's hero, may also have influenced Woolley's bowling action. Woolley approached the wicket with his bowling arm held behind his back; his biographer Ian Peebles later observed that the principal difference between the two bowlers was that Woolley delivered the ball from his hip, rather than from under the armpit, as Blythe had done.

After a single Second XI appearance in May 1906, a match in which he played alongside his brother Claud, Woolley was selected for Kent's First XI for the County Championship match against Lancashire at Old Trafford, replacing Blythe who had injured his hand while fielding.

=== 1906 season ===
Woolley's first-class debut proved challenging: he was dismissed for a duck from the third ball he faced, dropped Johnny Tyldesley, who went on to score 295 not out, three times, and took just one wicket in Lancashire's first innings. In Kent's second innings, however, Woolley scored 64 runs and he retained his place in the team for most of the remainder of the season. He missed only the matches played during Canterbury Cricket Week, a major social event at which amateur players were more likely to be available for selection.

Woolley recorded his first five-wicket haul in his second match, against Somerset at Gravesend, before producing a notable all-round performance against Surrey at The Oval in his third appearance. In that match he took eight wickets, including 5 for 80 in Surrey's second innings, and scored 72 and 26 not out, performances that secured victory for Kent and established his reputation as a player of considerable promise. He followed this with his first first-class century in the next match, played at the Angel Ground, and by the end of the season he had been awarded his county cap as Kent won their first County Championship title.

Writing after the end of the 1906 season, Wisden said that "Good as he already is, Woolley will no doubt... go far ahead of his first season's doings. It is quite possible he will be the best left-handed bat in England". He had played 16 matches, scored 779 runs and took 42 wickets.

== Style and technique ==
Writing for Barclay's World of Cricket, Harry Altham described Woolley as a "tall and graceful" figure who, with "a quiet air" was "unhurried in his movements". As a batsman, he had a gift for timing his shots and made full use of his long reach; he was especially strong in driving off his back foot against balls that other batsmen might consider good-length deliveries. He was equally graceful as a bowler, making full use of his height to extract additional bounce from his deliveries. Altham pointed out that, although Woolley lacked the subtlety of Wilfred Rhodes, he was nevertheless a formidable bowler on any pitch whose conditions helped him. Woolley's long reach and his "large, prehensile hands" made him an excellent fielder close to the wicket. Neville Cardus said of Woolley that "(his) strokes were brilliant, as much a matter of nature as the rays dazzling the field from the blue sky". In Woolley's Daily Telegraph obituary, E. W. Swanton considered him to be "as graceful a batsman as ever played".

According to R. C. Robertson-Glasgow: "When you wrote about him [Woolley], there weren't enough words. In describing a great innings by Woolley, and few of them were not great in artistry, you had to be careful with your adjectives and stack them in little rows, like pats of butter or razor-blades. In the first over of his innings, perhaps, there had been an exquisite off-drive, followed by a perfect cut, then an effortless leg-glide. In the second over, the same sort of thing happened; and your superlatives had already gone. The best thing to do was to presume that your readers knew how Frank Woolley batted and use no adjectives at all". He went on: "There was all summer in a stroke by Woolley, and he batted as it is sometimes shown in dreams". In his Wisden obituary, R. L. Arrowsmith wrote: "His average rate of scoring has been exceeded only by Jessop, and equalled by Trumper. His philosophy was to dominate the bowler. 'When I am batting', he said, 'I am the attack'".

== Wartime service ==
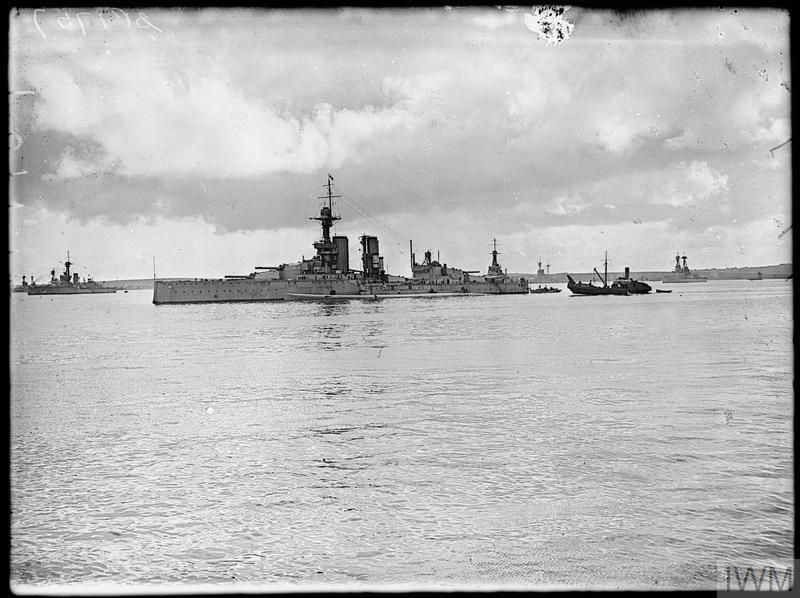
HMS King George V at anchor on the Firth of Forth in 1917. Woolley was attached to the ship in 1918 at North Queensferry.

After the outbreak of World War I in August 1914, the English cricket season continued, although public interest declined and the social aspects of the game were reduced. Woolley married in September 1914, shortly after the outbreak of war. His three brothers all joined the Kent Fortress Royal Engineers in 1914, (Note: Woolley's oldest brother Charlie was badly wounded during the Gallipoli campaign. Claud was injured in the artillery blast that killed Colin Blythe in 1917.) but when Woolley attempted to join them he failed his medical examination. (Note: The minutes of the Kent Committee record the cause of Woolley's medical failure as compacted toes on both feet, whilst his biographer, Ian Peebles, says that it was due to problems with his eyesight and teeth.) Instead, he went to work in his father's workshop, which had been converted to the manufacture of munitions.

Woolley was subsequently recruited by Jack Hobbs, who was also employed in the munitions industry, to play for Keighley Cricket Club in the Bradford Cricket League. He also made several appearances in exhibition matches, on one occasion scoring a century for a Lancashire XI against a Yorkshire XI in 1916.

Later in 1916, Woolley was accepted for service with the Royal Naval Air Service (RNAS). He began training in November and was posted to Dover in March 1917, where he was attached to a motor boat section. He was promoted to aircraftman first class and in February 1918 was transferred to Felixstowe, serving as the coxswain of a rescue launch.

In April 1918, the RNAS merged with the Royal Flying Corps to form the Royal Air Force (RAF), and Woolley was transferred to the new service. He was posted to North Queensferry, Scotland, where he worked under Admiral Sir John de Robeck. A keen cricketer, Robeck attached Woolley to his flagship, HMS King George V. Robeck arranged a number of cricket matches, including games held at the home of Lord Rosebery, a former captain of Surrey. During the summer of 1918, Woolley played in several more exhibition matches, including appearances for England against a Dominions XI and for teams organised by Pelham Warner.

Woolley was transferred to the RAF Reserve in January 1919 and was formally discharged in 1920. In 1922, he played a single first-class match for the Royal Air Force cricket team.

== Later life and family ==
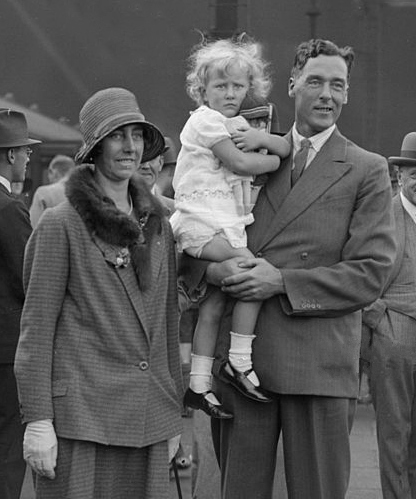
Woolley with his wife and daughter in 1929

Woolley married Sybil Fordham, the daughter of a veterinary surgeon from Ashford, in 1914. The couple had three children: one son and two daughters. Prior to his retirement from professional cricket, Woolley purchased a bungalow in Hildenborough, on land sufficiently large to allow him to establish a cricket school. He coached cricket at The King's School, Canterbury, but following the outbreak of the Second World War the school was evacuated to Cornwall. Woolley subsequently moved to Cliftonville, where he joined the Local Defence Volunteers.

Woolley's only son, Richard, was killed while serving as a merchant seaman on board SS Beaverford during Convoy HX 84 in November 1940. The family home in Cliftonville was later destroyed during a bombing raid in 1941.

During the war, Woolley took part in a number of exhibition matches intended to entertain the public and raise morale. After the war, he moved to Tunbridge Wells, where he continued to coach at The King's School for a further ten years. In the early 1950s, he also spent a summer coaching cricket at Butlin's holiday camp. Woolley played twice for Old England teams, was elected a life member of both Kent County Cricket Club and Marylebone Cricket Club (MCC), and served on Kent's General Committee between 1950 and 1961.

Following Sybil Woolley's death in 1962, Woolley moved to Longwick, Buckinghamshire to live with one of his daughters. He remained active in later like, regularly attending matches at the St Lawrence Ground during Canterbury Cricket Week, and in January 1971 travelled to Australia to watch the final two Tests matches of the 1970–71 Ashes series.

Later in 1971, Woolley married Martha Wilson Morse, an American widow, and the couple settled in the Canadian province of Nova Scotia. Woolley died in 1978 at their home in Chester, Nova Scotia aged 91. A memorial service was held at Canterbury Cathedral, and his ashes were scattered at the St Lawrence Ground.

Woolley was posthumously inducted into the Federation of International Cricketers' Associations Hall of Fame in 2000, and was an inaugural member of the ICC Cricket Hall of Fame when it was established in 2009.

== Bibliography ==
- Barclays (1986). Swanton, E. W.; Plumptre, George; Woodcock, John (eds.). Barclays World of Cricket. London: HarperCollins. ISBN 978-00-02181-93-8.
- Birley, Derek (1999). A Social History of English Cricket. London: Aurum Press. ISBN 978-18-54107-10-7 – via Internet Archive.
- Cardus, Neville (1956). Close of Play. London: Collins. OCLC 30163488.
- Carlaw, Derek (2020). Kent County Cricketers, A to Z: Part One (1806–1914) (PDF). Cardiff: ACS.
- Ellis, Clive; Pennell, Mark (2010). Trophies and Tribulations: Forty Years of Kent Cricket. London: Greenwich Publishing. ISBN 978-09-56408-10-5.
- Hughes, Simon (2010). And God Created Cricket. London: Black Swan. ISBN 978-05-52775-06-9.
- Lewis, Paul (2014). For Kent and Country. Eastbourne: Reveille Press. ISBN 978-19-08336-63-7.
- Milton, Howard (1988). F. E. Woolley—Famous Cricketers Series, No. 4. Nottingham: Association of Cricket Statisticians – via ACS.
- Milton, Howard; Francis, Peter (2020). Kent County Cricket Grounds. Worthing: Pitch Publishing. ISBN 978-17-85316-61-6.
- Moore, Dudley (1998). The History of Kent County Cricket Club. London: Christopher Helm. ISBN 978-07-47022-09-1.
- Moseling, Martin; Quarrington, Tony (2013). A Half-Forgotten Triumph: The story of Kent's County Championship title of 1913. York: SportsBooks Limited. ISBN 978-19-07524-40-0.
- Renshaw, Andrew (2014). Wisden on the Great War: The Lives of Cricket's Fallen 1914–1918. London: Bloomsbury. ISBN 978-14-08832-35-6.
- Scoble, Christopher (2005). Colin Blythe: Lament for a Legend. York: SportsBooks Limited. ISBN 978-18-99807-31-4.
- Swanton, E. W. (2011). "Woolley, Frank Edward". Oxford Dictionary of National Biography (online ed.). Oxford University Press. doi:10.1093/ref:odnb/31858. (Subscription, Wikipedia Library access or UK public library membership required.)
