= Biddlestone Hall =

Demolished building in North East England

Coordinates: 55.3687°N 2.0723°W

Biddlestone Hall was a large country house at Biddlestone in Northumberland.

== History ==
The Georgian style mansion was built for the Selby family about 1796 on the site of an older house, and in about 1820 Walter Selby commissioned architect John Dobson to design various changes to the house including a private family chapel to be incorporated into the Hall. The Selbys left Biddlestone in about 1914 and the Hall deteriorated to such an extent that it was demolished in 1957 leaving only the chapel standing.

== See also ==
- Biddlestone Chapel
- The Selby family
- List of country houses in the United Kingdom

== Publications ==
- Robinson, John, Felling the Ancient Oaks, Aurum Press, 2011, ISBN 978-1845136703
