= Henry Bourne (historian) =

English historian

Henry Bourne (c.1694 – 16 February 1733) was an English historian, who is remembered for his Antiquitates Vulgares (1725), a pioneering work in the field of folklore studies, and for his substantial history of his home town of Newcastle upon Tyne (1736).

Bourne was born in Newcastle, the son of Thomas Bourne, a tailor, in about 1694: he was baptised on 16 December 1694. His father originally had him apprenticed as a glazier; but he showed such promise that he was sent to the Royal Free Grammar School in Newcastle, where he flourished, eventually winning a scholarship to Cambridge under the tutelage of The Reverend Mr. Thomas Atherton, a fellow Novocastrian.

He was appointed curate at All Hallows Church in Newcastle in 1724 and held the position until his death in 1733.

In 1725 Bourne published his most acclaimed work, Antiquitates Vulgares, or, Antiquities of the Common People. This provided a record of various folk customs and ceremonies in England, although its more pragmatic aim was to identify those customs that might be encouraged, and those that should be abolished or regulated.

His huge and very complete history of Newcastle was not quite finished upon his death in Newcastle on 16 February 1733. It was published posthumously in 1736 under the title The History of Newcastle upon Tyne, or the Ancient and Present State of that Town.
