= Thomas Selby =

Thomas Selby may refer to:

- Thomas Selby (cricketer, born c.1765), English cricketer
- Thomas Selby (cricketer, born 1791) (1791–1874), Kent cricketer
- Thomas Selby (cricketer, born 1851) (1851–1924), English cricketer for Derbyshire
- Thomas Henry Selby (1820–1875), American politician, mayor of San Francisco
- Thomas J. Selby (1840–1917), American politician, U.S. Representative from Illinois
