= Camphill Column, Alnwick =

Camphill Column
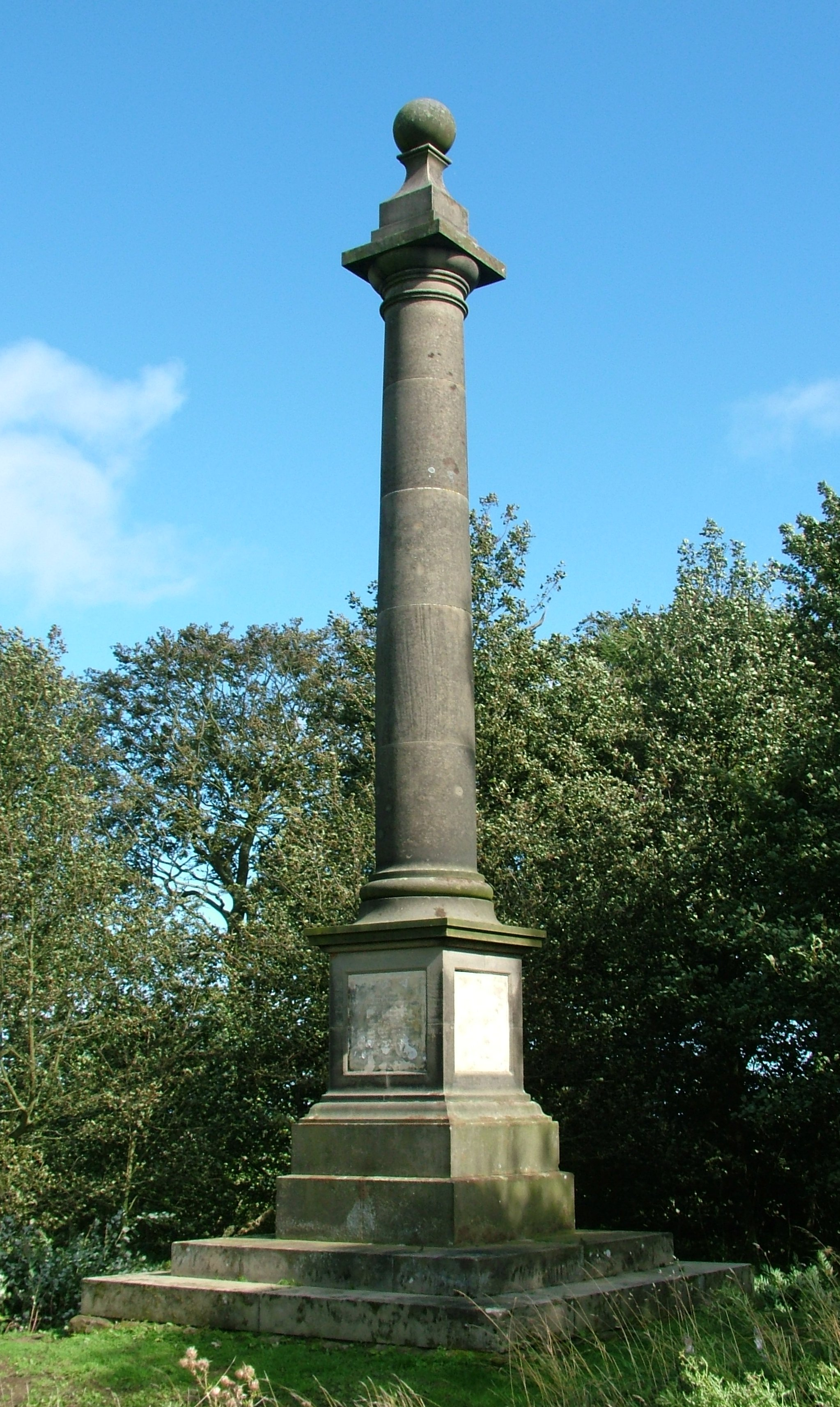
- The Camphill Column
- Interactive map of Camphill Column
- Location: Alnwick, Northumberland, England
- Coordinates: 55.40484°N 1.71514°W
- Type: Tuscan column
- Material: Stone
- Completion date: 1814
- Dedicated to: Pitt, Wellington, Nelson, Henry Collingwood Selby

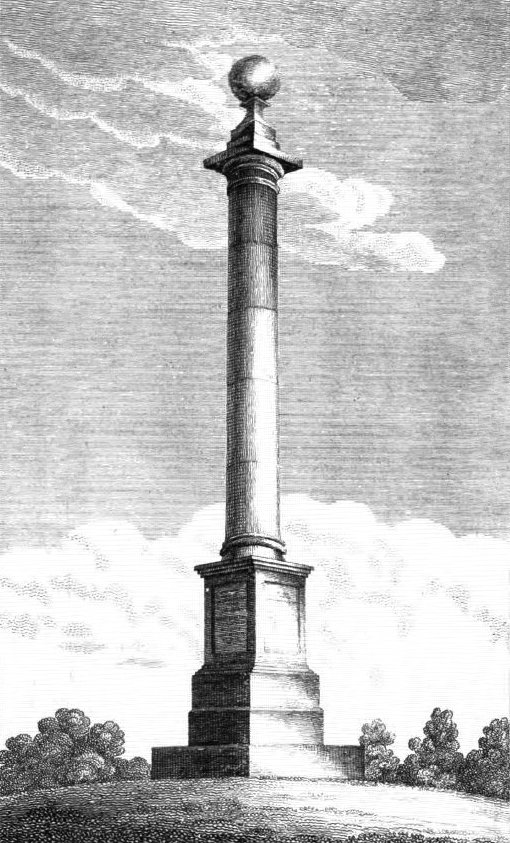
Illustration of the Camphill Column from A Descriptive and Historical View of Alnwick, 1822

The Camphill Column in Alnwick, Northumberland, is a stone column erected in 1814, celebrating a number of British victories over the French and others, and the restoration of peace to Europe. It carries inscriptions to Pitt, Wellington, Nelson and its progenitor, Henry Collingwood Selby. The column is a Grade II* listed building.

== The column ==
Camp Hill is a site described as dating back to the time of the ancient Britons; an oval shape now much degraded and measuring some 120 yards by 104 yards. The hill is alternately described as the site of an army camp.

The column at Camp Hill was commissioned by Henry Collingwood Selby and constructed by John Hall, mason. It was situated in the grounds of Selby's estate, Swansfied Park. It is suggested that Selby "was a keen defender of the status quo against those locally who were sympathetic to the principles of the French Revolution."

The column is described as being "executed after Vetruvius' plan". The column stands on two large square steps, and is surmounted by a stone ball. The Public Monument and Sculpture Association description of the column is "Small Tuscan column surmounted by a platform with a small pedestal and ball finial on top. It stands in a copse on the damaged remains of an oval univallate hillfort in the middle of what is now a golf course."

On the square tablets of the east, south, west, and north sides are the following inscriptions:

England has saved herself by her firmness, and Europe by her example. – Pitt
This Pillar was erected by HENRY COLLINGWOOD SELBY, a Magistrate of this County, to commemorate the persevering and victorious efforts of the British Empire by sea and land during an arduous struggle of XX years, and the signal successes of the Powers united with this Country at the close of that eventful period; the expulsion of the French from Russia after the burning of Moscow in MDCCCXII, the defeats of their armies in Germany in the memorable campaign of MDCCCXIII, the invasion of France, the surrender of Paris, the downfall of Napoleon Buonaparte, the re-establishment of the Bourbon monarchs, and the restoration of Peace to Europe in MDCCCXIV.

Vice-Admiral HORATIO VISCOUNT NELSON of the Nile defeated the French and Danish Fleets at Aboukir and Copenhagen, and fell in the decisive victory of Trafalgar achieved over the combined Navies of France and Spain in MDCCCV.

Field Marshal THE DUKE OF WELLINGTON having vanquished the Armies of France in Portugal and in Spain, at the Battles of Vimeira and Talavera, Salamanca and Vittoria, drove them beyond the Pyrenuces, and advancing to the banks of the Garonne again overthrew them under the walls of Toulouse in Mdcccxiv.

The Right Honourable WILLIAM PITT directed the councils and energies of his country during the first years of a just and necessary war, and died in MDCCCVI, having established that wise and vigorous system of policy, which succeeding statesmen, emulous of his example, steadily pursued till they secured Independence for the Nations of the Continent and a Peace of unparalleled glory for this empire.

The column was listed in August 1977, and survived the demolition of Selby's seat, Swansfield House, in 1975, and now stands within the grounds of Alnwick Golf Club.

== See also ==
- Tenantry Column
- Brizlee Tower
