= Mazzio's =

American restaurant chain

- Industry: Restaurant
- Founded: 1961; 65 years ago in Tulsa, Oklahoma
- Founder: Ken Selby
- Website: www.mazzios.com

Mazzio's Pizza & Wings is a restaurant specializing in pizzas, pastas, sandwiches, and occasionally other specialty items. Mazzio's began as a pizza parlor and is located throughout Oklahoma, Kansas, Texas, Iowa, Missouri, Arkansas, Tennessee, Mississippi, Georgia, and Illinois. The sole Mazzio's in Louisiana, located in Shreveport, closed in the mid-1990s. It was first founded in 1961, when a young school teacher named Ken Selby opened a restaurant named The Pizza Parlor at 3024 East 11th Street in Tulsa, Oklahoma, which is still operating as a Mazzio's location today. In 1965, Selby opened a second location at 15th and Sheridan in Tulsa (also still operating as Mazzio's) and changed the name to Ken's Pizza. By 1975, there were more than 100 franchise locations in and around Oklahoma.

As the founder of the Ken's Pizza chain found in and around the Tulsa, Oklahoma area, only franchised Ken's Pizzas remain. In August 2008, Mazzio's Corporation opened a new full service, contemporary, casual Italian concept called Oliveto Italian Bistro in Tulsa.

== History ==
Founded in 1961 by school teacher Ken Selby, who ran his new business virtually alone and after teaching a full day as well. Four years later in 1965, Selby made pizza his full-time job. He opened a second location, which exceeded the success of his first. Plus, the name changed to Ken's Pizza that solidly branded Selby's popular special recipe sauce and thin crust. By 1975, the links of his two starting stores steadily grew to a strong chain of over 100 company and franchise locations, inside and outside of Oklahoma.

In the late 1970s, Selby conceived a new business approach. His idea called for more square footage of casual dining space, an expanded menu, thicker pizza served with much more meats and cheeses, sub sandwiches along with a salad bar.

That new concept was Mazzio's Pizza. In ten years, the Mazzio's chain grew to over 150 locations. Currently, the concept features 165 units in ten states.

In September 2024, Mazzio's Italian Eatery rebranded to Mazzio's Pizza & Wings.

== See also ==
- List of pizza chains of the United States
