= John Selby =

John Selby may refer to:

- John Selby (cricketer) (1849–1894), English cricketer
- John Selby (MP), Member of Parliament for Berwick-upon-Tweed
- John Selby (died 1595), English official on the Scottish border
- John B. Selby (1915–1982), World War II Royal Air Force flying ace
- Ken Selby (John Kenneth Selby, 1936–2012), founder of Mazzio's Corporation
