= Biddlestone Chapel =

Coordinates: 55.3688°N 2.0720°W

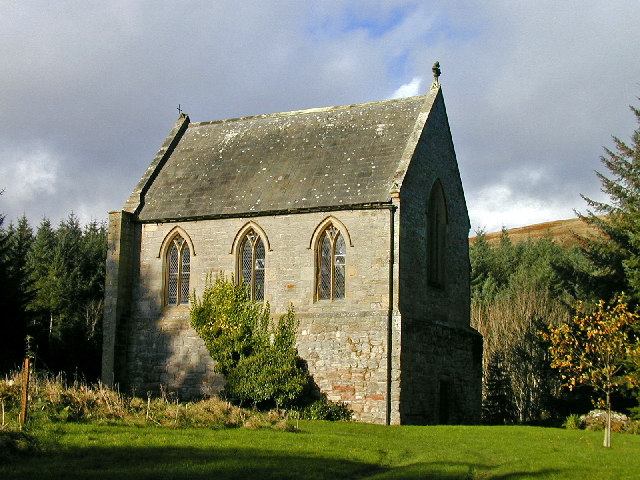
- Biddlestone Chapel from the southeast

- Location in Northumberland
- OS grid reference: NT 955,083
- Location: Biddlestone, Northumberland
- Country: England
- Denomination: Roman Catholic
- Website: Biddlestone Chapel

Architecture
- Functional status: Redundant
- Heritage designation: Grade II*
- Designated: 31 July 1986
- Architect: John Dobson (?)
- Architectural type: Chapel
- Style: Gothic Revival
- Groundbreaking: c. 1820
- Completed: 1856
- Closed: 1992

Specifications
- Materials: Stone, slate roof

Biddlestone Chapel is a redundant Roman Catholic chapel in Biddlestone, Northumberland, England. It is recorded in the National Heritage List for England as a Grade II* listed building. The lower parts of the structure, a former pele tower, are designated as a Scheduled Monument. The chapel is located on the slopes of the Cheviot Hills in the Northumberland National Park.

== History ==
Biddlestone Chapel was built in or about 1820 for the Roman Catholic Selby family of Biddlestone Hall, the architect probably being John Dobson who designed the now demolished Selby mansion in a severe Greek Revival style. It is constructed on the site of a 13th-century pele tower, which was attached to the hall, and incorporates some of its fabric. Alterations were made to the interior of the chapel in 1862 by William Selby. The Biddlestone estate was sold in 1914, and the chapel became the responsibility of the Diocese of Hexham and Newcastle. During the Second World War the basement was converted into an air raid shelter. The chapel became redundant in 1992, and transferred to the ownership of Historic Chapels Trust in 1996. The Trust carried out a programme of restoration and repair in 2008. The rest of the hall was demolished circa 1960.

Since 2008 the Chapel has been in the care of the Historic Chapels Trust (HCT). As the Historic Chapels Trust wound up its operations in 2025, Biddlestone Chapel was transferred to the Friends of Friendless Churches, a national charity looking after over 70 historic places of worship across England and Wales.

== Architecture ==
=== Exterior ===
Medieval masonry from the pele tower has been retained in the lower parts of the chapel, clearly seen on the exterior. This extends up to the eaves on the north side, with walls up to 6 feet (1.8 m) high, and as a result, the chapel appears tall for its footprint. The rest of the chapel is constructed in random rubble ashlar. It has a Lakeland slate roof. The chapel has three bays. At the east end is an entrance and a three-light window with Y-tracery. There are three more windows on the south side. The west end was formerly attached to the hall. It is irregular and patched, and contains parts of blocked mullioned windows. There is also a doorway leading to a stairway to the upper floor; this was initially external, but has been closed in. On the east gable is a foliated cross finial.

=== Interior ===
Inside, the basement is the tunnel vaulted lower part of the tower. At the east end of this is a corrugated iron air raid shelter. Upstairs is the chapel proper, with plastered walls, a timber roof, and Gothic Revival fittings. Originally the walls were decorated with stencilling. There are heraldic crests in the stained glass of the Selby family dating to 1862. The walls at the east end are inscribed with quotations from the Psalms. Flanking the altar are statues of Mary and Joseph. The Stations of the Cross are represented by photographs. The stained glass in the east window is attributed to William Wailes, and depicts the Crucifixion.

== See also ==
- List of chapels preserved by the Historic Chapels Trust
