= Questioning French Secularism =

2012 book

Questioning French Secularism: Gender Politics and Islam in a Parisian Suburb
- Author: Jennifer Selby
- Subject: secular politics
- Published: 2012
- Publisher: Palgrave Macmillan Press
- Pages: 247 pp.
- ISBN: 978-1-137-01132-9

Questioning French Secularism: Gender Politics and Islam in a Parisian Suburb is a 2012 book by Jennifer Selby, in which the author examines how contemporary secularism in France is positioned as a guarantor of women’s rights.
