= Debating Sharia =

2012 book

Debating Sharia: Islam, Gender Politics, and Family Law Arbitration
- Author: Jennifer Selby and Anna C. Korteweg
- Subject: sociology of religion
- Published: 2012
- Publisher: University of Toronto Press
- Pages: 384 pp.
- ISBN: 978-1-4426-9443-9

Debating Sharia: Islam, Gender Politics, and Family Law Arbitration is a 2012 book edited by Jennifer Selby and Anna C. Korteweg in which the authors focus on the legal ramifications of Sharia law in the context of Western liberal democracies and examine the issue from different methodological perspectives.
