= White Hart Field =

Cricket ground in London, England

- Interactive map of White Hart Field

Ground information
- Location: London Borough of Bromley
- Country: England
- Coordinates: 51.405°N 0.018°E
- Establishment: 1751 (first recorded match)
- Last used: 1886 (last recorded match)

Team information
Kent County Cricket Club	(1841–1847)
Bromley Cricket Club	(1856–1886)
- As of 5 September 2010; Source: CricketArchive

White Hart Field was a cricket ground in Bromley in south-east London. The ground, which was in the county of Kent until 1965, was on an area of open space and farm land which stretched from Bromley Palace to Widmore Green. The area was used regularly for cricket in the 18th century and the cricket field was at the back of the White Hart Inn which it was named after, although the only recorded matches on the ground took place in the 1840s.

Teams representing Kent played two matches on the ground in 1841 and 1842 against an England team. The second match, which took place in August 1842, marks the first match which Kent County Cricket Club played after the official formation of the club during the 1842 Canterbury Cricket Week. These two matches were retrospectively awarded first-class cricket status. The final recorded match on the ground took place in 1847 when the Gentlemen of Kent played the Gentlemen of Surrey. The ground was the home ground of Bromley Cricket Club between 1856 and 1886.

The field where the ground was located was in private ownership until 1897 when it was donated to the town of Bromley to mark the Diamond Jubilee of Queen Victoria with part of the field becoming an ornamental park. Originally named Victoria Gardens, the site of the ground is now part of Queens Gardens managed by Bromley Borough Council alongside The Glades shopping centre. The area is no longer used for cricket and the ground itself is no longer physically in existence although a plaque marks the former use of the gardens.
