= David Stephenson (architect) =

English architect

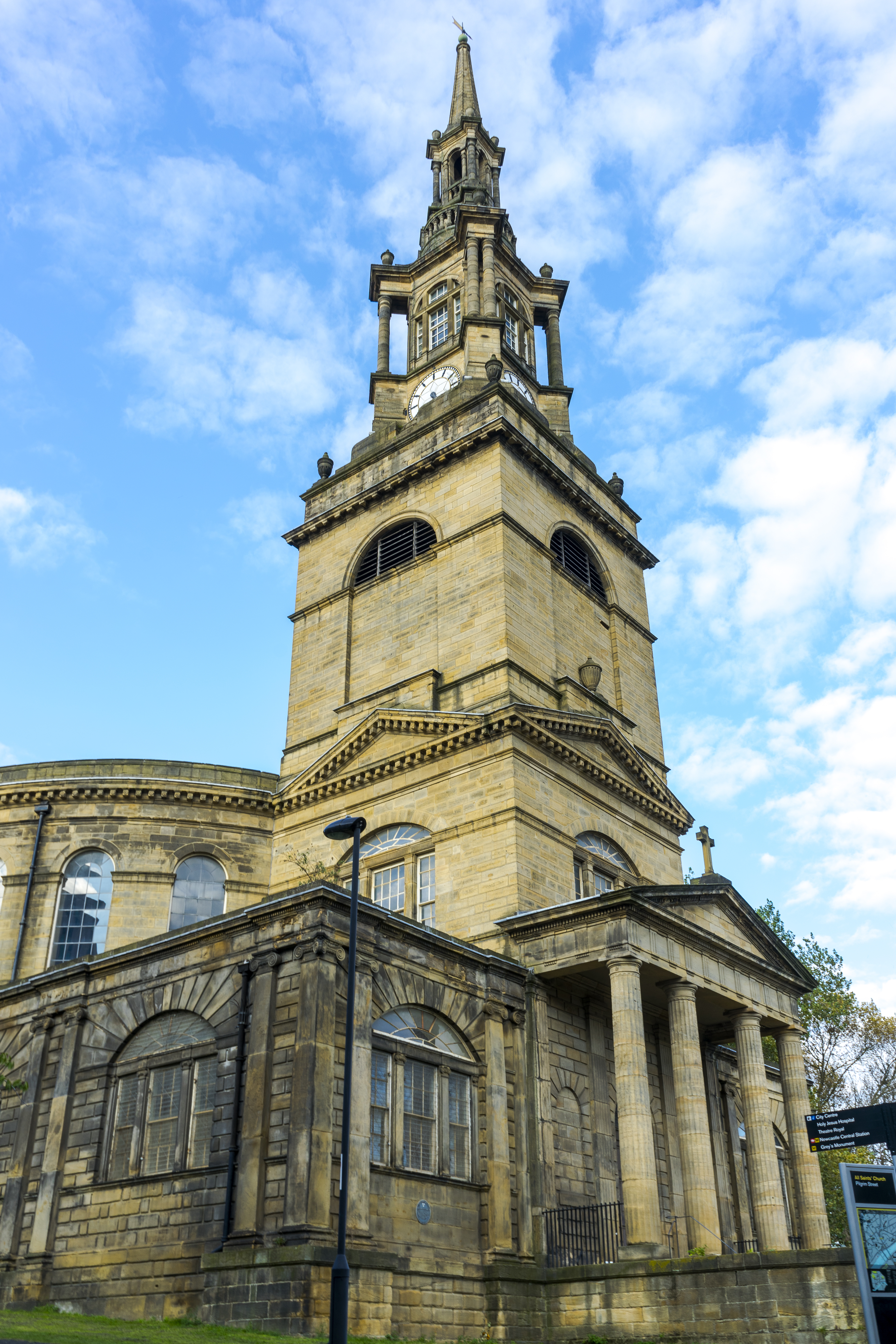
Stephenson's masterpiece: All Saints' Church, Newcastle

David Stephenson (1757–1819) was an English architect who worked in Newcastle upon Tyne and Northumberland. He was the first Newcastle architect trained in London and was "Newcastle's and the North East's leading architect" at the start of the 19th century.

== Life ==
David Stephenson was the son of John Stephenson and Ann Crawforth. The eldest of five, he was baptised at Castle Garth Presbytery, Newcastle, on 6 November 1757. John Stephenson (died 1796), was a carpenter who built a temporary wooden bridge after the destruction of the mediaeval Tyne Bridge in 1771.

David was apprenticed as a carpenter and then turned to architecture, studying at The Royal Academy from 1782 to 1783.

He returned to Newcastle and married Margaret Gibbon (1755–1839) in 1783. They had four sons and four daughters.

Stephenson was a founder member of the Literary and Philosophical Society of Newcastle upon Tyne and an early member of The Society of Antiquaries. In 1803 he commanded a company of volunteers in Newcastle.

He died in Alnwick on 29 August 1819. There is a marble plaque commemorating Stephenson in All Saints' Church, Newcastle, where he is buried.

== Work ==
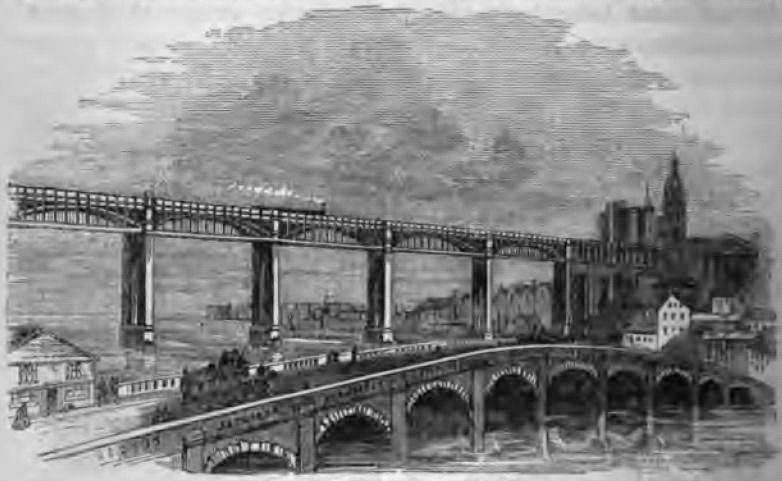
The Georgian Tyne Bridge (foreground), as widened by Stephenson in 1802

Stephenson's style has been characterised by Faulkner and Greg as "delicate Neo-classicism". His grander buildings are in a bold style, using honeycomb sandstone and the highest quality masonry to create an effect that foreshadows work by John Dobson, who served his architectural apprenticeship with Stephenson from 1804 to 1809.

He was architect to Newcastle Corporation and laid out Mosley Street and Dean Street, the first streets to deviate from the mediaeval town plan. He widened the Georgian Tyne Bridge in 1802, using "an ingenious contrivance" of iron cramps. He was then appointed architect to the Duke of Northumberland, for whom he designed the uncompleted New Quay development at North Shields and the Percy Tenantry Column in Alnwick.

One of Stephenson's more significant works was All Saints Church, Newcastle. The design was adapted from an unexecuted scheme by James Gibbs for Saint Martin-in-the-Fields, London.

== List of works ==
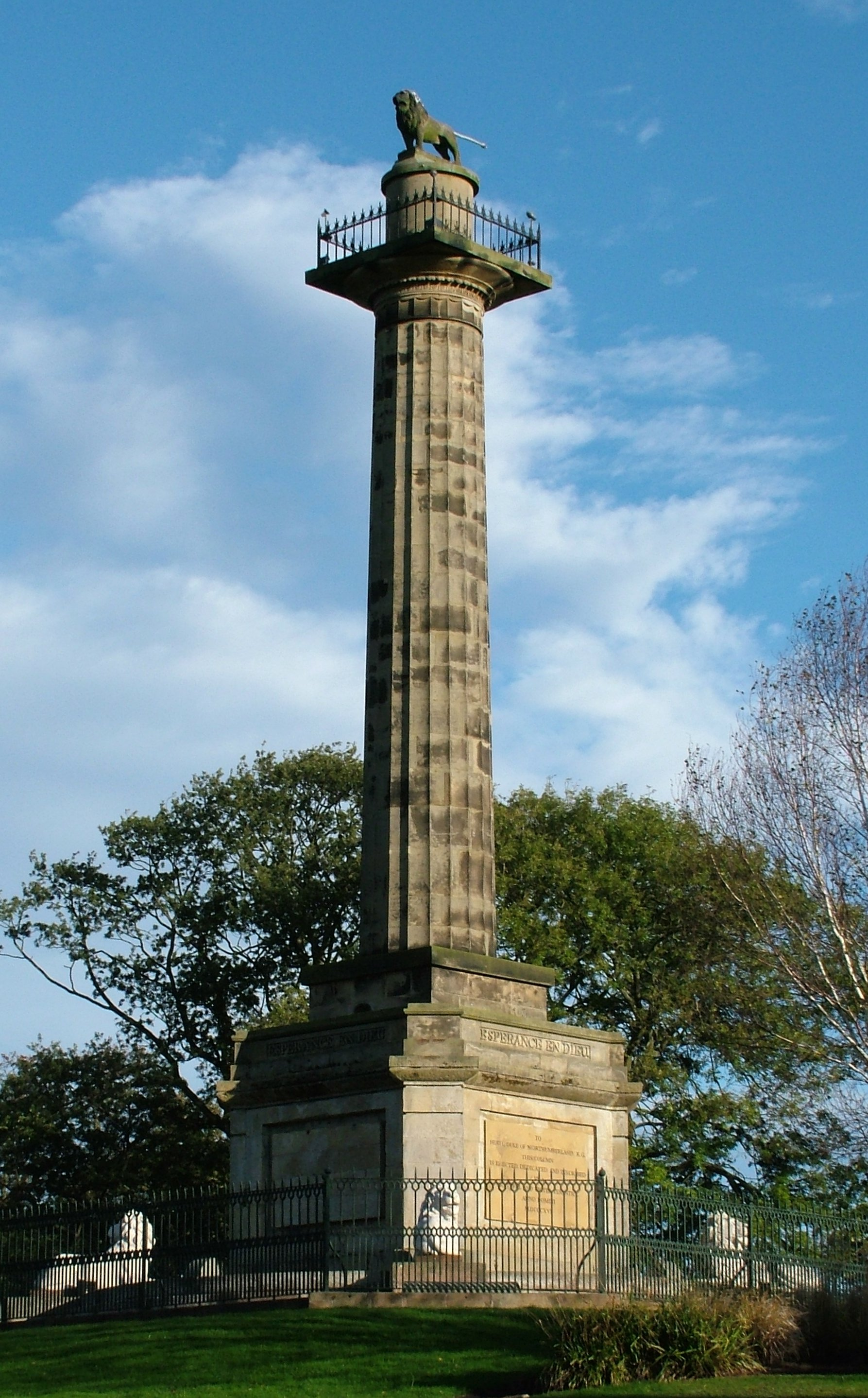
The Percy Tenantry Column, Alnwick, Northumberland

- Mosley St., Newcastle 1780s (only numbers 3–5, 10 and 32–34 survive)
- Old Theatre Royal, Mosley Street, Newcastle 1788 (demolished c.1838)
- Dean St., Newcastle c. 1789 (only even numbers 18–20 and 30–52 survive)
- The Cale Cross, Newcastle (now at Blagdon) 1783
- All Saints Church, Newcastle 1786–1789, spire 1796
- St Nicholas Cathedral, Newcastle 1783–1787 (internal restoration), with William Newton
- Church St., Gateshead, 1791 (demolished)
- Guildhall, Newcastle upon Tyne 1794–1796 (refronting), with William Newton
- Widening of the Georgian Tyne Bridge, Newcastle 1802 (demolished 1876)
- New Quay, North Shields 1806–1817 (numbers 2–50 survive, now Collingwood Mansions)
- Leazes Park Rd., Newcastle c.1811 (only numbers 8–10 and 21–23 survive)
- Cast-iron estate bridge, Hulne Park, Alnwick 1812
- The Percy Tenantry Column, Alnwick, 1816
