= All Saints' Church, Newcastle upon Tyne =

All Saints' Church

- All Saints' Church shown within Tyne and Wear
- 54.9699°N 1.6070°W
- OS grid reference: NZ252639
- Location: Newcastle upon Tyne
- Country: England
- Denomination: Evangelical Presbyterian
- Previous denomination: Church of England; Old Catholic
- Website: All Saints' Church

Architecture
- Architect: David Stephenson
- Architectural type: Neoclassical architecture

All Saints' Church is a late 18th-century church in Lower Pilgrim Street, Newcastle upon Tyne, England, which replaced a medieval church on the same site. All Saints' Church is the only elliptical church building in England, the third tallest religious building in Newcastle and the ninth-tallest structure in the city overall. It is a Grade I listed building.

== History ==
=== The old church ===
A Christian church stood here in 1286, and here continued to stand, of course undergoing many changes and restorations between times, until the end of the eighteenth century, when it was pulled down, and the present church built. The original All Saints', or All Hallows', was built in the Gothic style. Its appearance is thus described by Henry Bourne:

This church is seated upon a hill, which is much about the same height with the situation of St. Mary’s, in Gateshead, and upon the same line with it. It is not so long as St. Nicholas, being only 55 yards 1 foot a quarter long, but it is broader, as being 25 yards 2 feet broad. The steeple is but a mean height being a square tower, with only one spire arising from it. The bells belonging to this church were founded in 1696. They were cast out of the metal of that famous statue of King James the Second which stood on the Sandhill. They were founded in the ground belonging to St Austin Friars, in that part of it which is in the back of the Hospital of the Holy Jesus. Their sound is not so melodious as the others in this town, but the note is exceedingly exact, and more tuneful than the others.

McKenzie, who was living when the old church was pulled down, and when much public interest was taken in it, gives in his history an interesting account, from which we gather that the steeple and west end occupied the site of the present church. The church extended further east over what is now the burial ground. The steeple was a low, square, inelegant tower, supported by buttresses at the corners of the west side, and terminated by large embrasures. From the centre rose a small square turret, surmounted by a short spire, terminated with a gilt vane. The principal entrance into the church was the west door of the steeple which corresponded in size with the west door of St Nicholas's. Above it was a large and beautiful Gothic window. There were also a north and south porch, the former leading into Silver Street, the latter into Pilgrim Street. The steeple contained a good clock, with chimes and two painted dials. The five bells were cast by Christopher Hodgson of London. There were seven chantries; one of them – St Peter's – being founded by Roger Thornton. The windows of the old church were large and ornamented with stained glass, but they were greatly damaged at the time of the civil war.

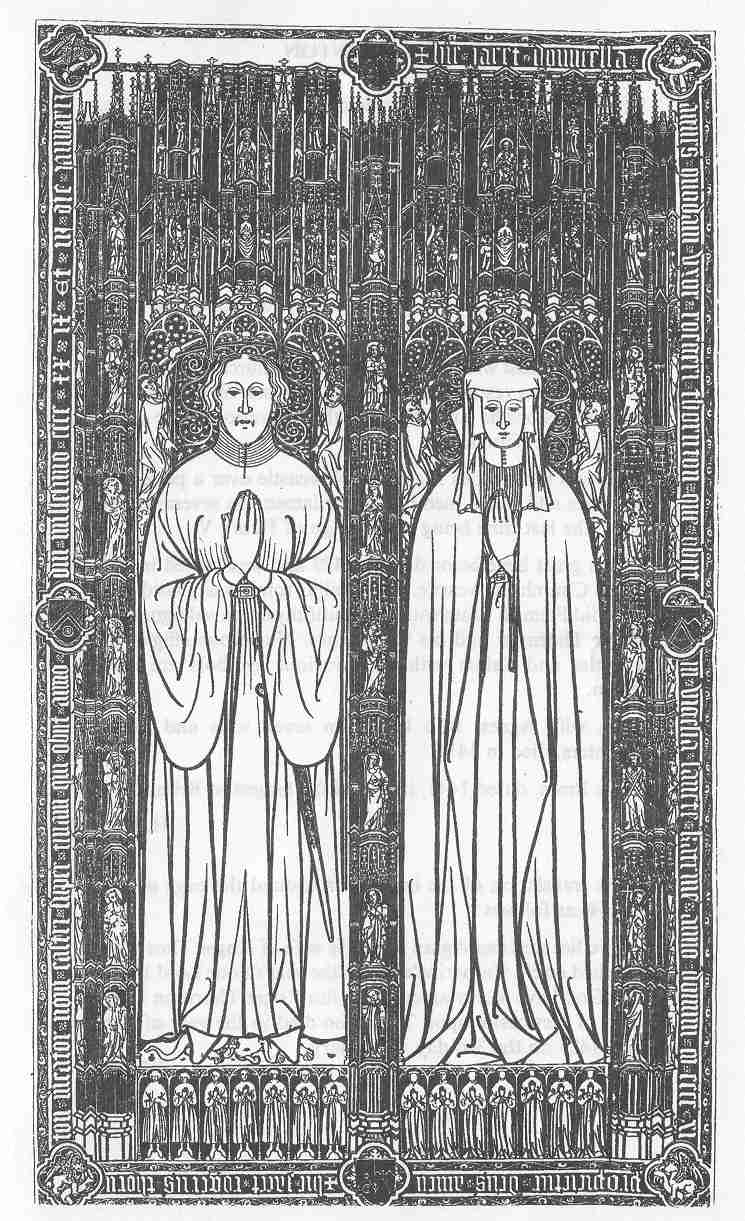
Monumental brass to Roger and Agnes Thornton, previously in All Saints' Church and now hung in the nearby Newcastle Cathedral

But the finest monument in the church was, fittingly, that erected to the munificent "Patron of Newcastle", Roger Thornton. Brand gives an illustration of it, and Mackenzie describes it thus: "It consisted of an altar, the front of which was enriched with beautiful gothic compartments and armorial bearings, over which rose an elliptic canopy, surmounted by a spiral arch rising in the centre and terminated with a tower, the crest of the Thornton family. The whole was included in a wall with a semi-octagonal tower at each end and embrasures along the top. On this part of the monument was the representation of two small figures supporting the family arms. But the principal ornament of this monument was the large brass plate which covered the top of the altar, on which were beautifully engraved the figures of Roger Thornton and Agnes his wife, with numerous effigies of the apostles and saints, many of them with the symbols of their martyrdom. The beautiful monument is now gone, but the brass is still preserved and hangs in the vestry. In 1841 the vicar of the church, the Rev. R. Green, had it cleaned, repaired, and fitted into the wood frame in which it now hangs." This memorial brass has now been installed behind the altar of St Nicholas's Cathedral in Newcastle, facing the east window.

A very interesting feature of the church was the seamen's porch, and gallery on the north side, built by the Master and Brethren of the nearby Trinity House, Newcastle in 1618. The front of the gallery was decorated with painted panels. The centre one bore the arms of Trinity House, and on the side panels were depicted four scriptural subjects, all most appropriately being connected with the sea.

Connected with the font of the old church is the name of a Newcastle worthy which deserves to be recorded. When the Scots entered the town in 1640 they commenced, in their fanatical zeal against Popery, to deface the religious monuments. Beginning at St John's, the first object sacrificed was, naturally, the font which stood in the porch. One Cuthbert Maxwell, a stonemason of Newcastle, seeing this, ran in haste to St Nicholas’ and All Saints’, and hid the fonts of these churches before the Scots had time to reach them. After the Restoration he set them up again, and thus to Cuthbert Maxwell we owe the preservation of the beautiful font of St Nicholas. Concerning that belonging to All Saints’ the font thus saved was octagonal in shape, and carved with armorial bearings. At the demolition of the church it was given to Alderman Hugh Hornby, that enthusiastic collector of antiquities who built the carved stones from Tyne Bridge towers into the wall of his garden in Pilgrim Street.

Of the early history of old All Saints' there are few records except accounts of repairs. We hear of the assembly of the “Four-and-Twenty”, and of the “Ancients of the Parish” – for the purpose of considering needful repairs, and of levying cesses for carrying them out. The parish register commences in 1600.

=== The new church ===
About 1785 the churchwardens procured plans and estimates for the restoration of the building from William Newton, of Newcastle; but Dr Sharp, the Archdeacon of Northumberland, objected to the proposed design of shortening the chancel, and thus altering the form of an old Gothic church. Two other architects, David Stephenson and John Dodds, were called in, and they reported that it was impossible to give an estimate for restoring the church, as so many unforeseen circumstances might crop up. They reported, "That this decayed building cannot be repaired but at as much expense as building a new one. If one part is taken down the rest will follow." It appeared that "the south wall was in danger of falling by the pressure of the roof; one of the pillars of the steeple had considerably shrunk, and the steeple itself inclined to the south. The stone of the groined arches under the bells was decayed, the timber and bells in great danger of falling in, the stone in several windows decayed, the walls were rotten, and the lime had lost its cement and become almost dust".

On Easter Tuesday (18 April 1786) a general meeting of the parishioners was held, and they resolved unanimously to erect a new church. The work of destroying the old one proceeded immediately and, unfortunately, most of its old monuments, windows, and other interesting relics were not preserved; they either perished or were carried away during the operations. It was found necessary to blast with gunpowder the masonry of the tower, so tenacious was the mortar binding it, and while doing so a sad accident occurred, by which a well-known inhabitant of the town lost his life. This was Captain William Hedley, who was killed by one of the stones of the great west door falling upon him while he was standing watching the work of destruction. He was greatly respected in Newcastle, and well known abroad as the hero of a deed of humanity and daring, in saving a child from drowning in Bordeaux harbour. His conduct on that occasion was praised highly in the French newspapers.

The whole of the old church having at length been taken down, the construction of the new one was commenced with. The design of David Stephenson had been selected, and the foundation stone was laid on 14 August 1786 by the Rev. James Stephen Lushington, Vicar of Newcastle. In proceeding with the building the original design was departed from in two important points. The portico, which was to have had a colonnade of Ionic columns along the south front, was altered to the present Doric design, and the money thus saved was devoted to the improvement of the tower. According to the original design, the latter was to have consisted of "a plain octagonal tower, of uniform width, rising from the arch on which the present spire stands to the height of thirty-seven and a-half feet, and terminating with a semicircular dome twelve feet in diameter, making a total height of one hundred and forty-three feet from the ground. The tame and spiritless appearance of the model, however, happily caused its rejection. A model of the present handsome and superior design was exhibited to the trustees in August 1790, and finally adopted on the 12th of September following."

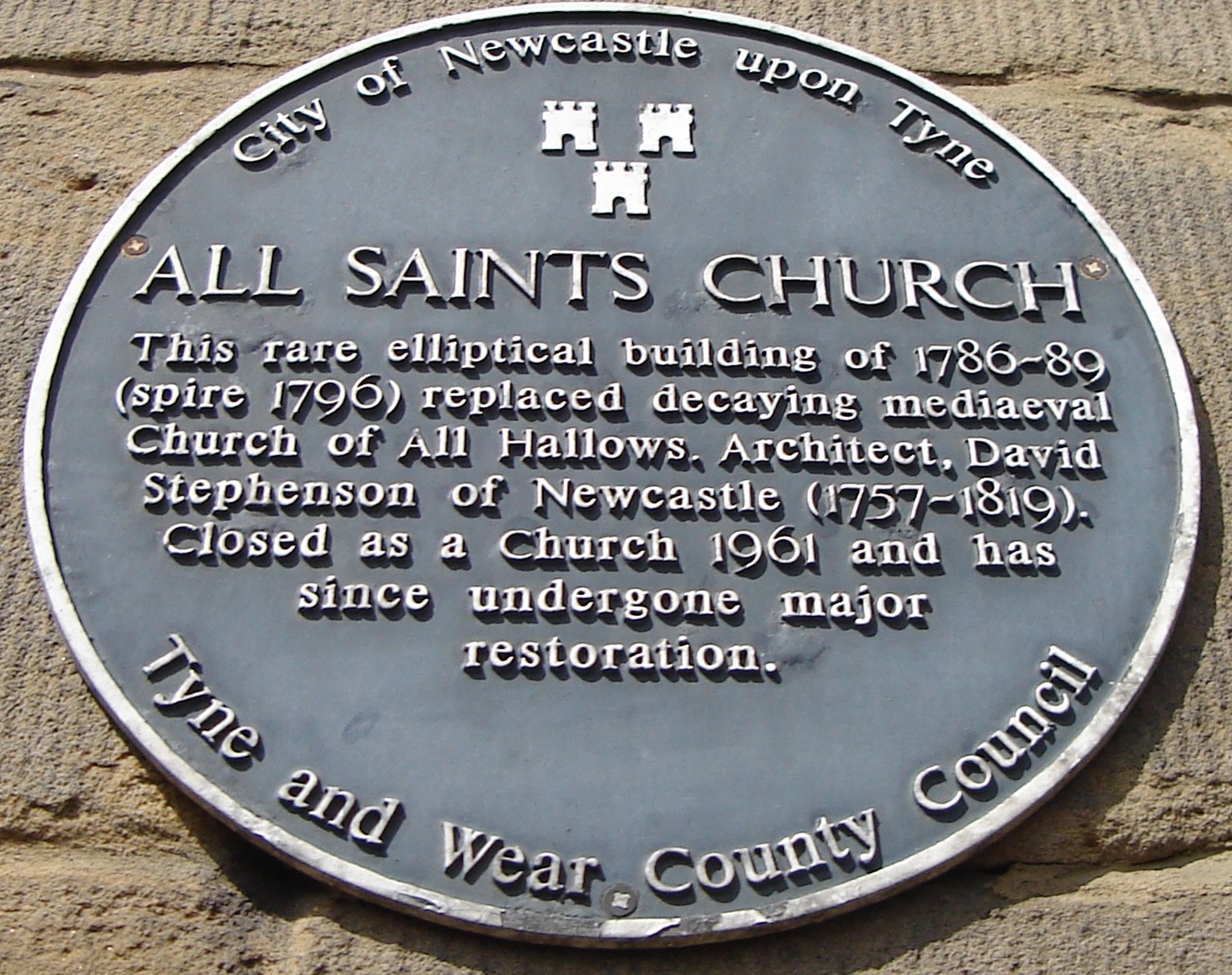
The new church was finished in 1796...

The new church was finished in 1796, and its cost was £27,000, the whole being obtained by assessment of the parish, except £2061.19s raised by the sale of pews, £30 by donations, and £100 given by Mrs Atlee for the additional expense of making the internal fittings of mahogany instead of oak. The church is built in the form of an ellipse, the longer diameter of which runs nearly north and south. It is in form like the Pantheon at Rome. The roof, without any supporting pillars, is a splendid piece of carpentry. It was first put together in the yard at the Austin Friars, where the bells of the old church were cast. The square tower on which the steeple stands is at the south end, and the interior forms the vestibule. On either side of it there is a wing – that on the left being used as a morning chapel and for baptisms, and that on the right as the vestry where hung the monumental brass of Roger Thornton, now moved to Newcastle Cathedral.

On Tuesday, 17 November 1789, the new church was consecrated by the Right Rev. Thomas Thurlow, Lord Bishop of Durham, and the opening sermon was preached by the Rev. Hugh Moises, morning lecturer of All Saints’ and head-master of the Grammar School. His text was from Leviticus xix: 30: Ye shall keep My Sabbaths and reverence My sanctuary. I am the Lord.

In 1881 the churchwardens called the public attention to the state of the church, and appealed for help to remedy it. Subscriptions were gathered in and the work of restoration was vigorously proceeded with.

About the end of 1881 Richard S. Donkin of Campville, North Shields, a wealthy shipowner, whose place of business was close by the old church, made a handsome offer to improve the graveyard at his own expense. This offer was thankfully accepted by the parishioners, and early in 1882 the work was proceeded with. Many other generous gifts were at the same time made to the church, but we will only mention one more, that of the presentation of the new clock by Mr John Hall, another Newcastle merchant. It was formally set going and illuminated on the evening of 3 February 1882. On the occasion an address was presented to Mr Hall by Mr Joseph Cowen, M.P. for the town, on behalf of the people of the parish. In presenting this address Mr Cowen, standing on the steps of the church, made a speech to the assembled people who crowded below to the number of about ten thousand.

The church at sunset

== Recent history ==
The church was deconsecrated in 1961, and converted to offices/auditorium in 1983-84 as the Town Teacher initiative. It was then used by the Royal Northern Sinfonia before their move across the river to The Sage, Gateshead in 2004. The church was for a while used by the Church of Saint Willibrord with All Saints, a member of The Old Catholic Church Anglican Diocese. It has also hosted musical events. Following flooding damage caused by blocked roof drains over the 2009/2010 and 2010/2011 winters, the building was left in a state of semi-disrepair. In 2015 it was placed on Historic England's Heritage at Risk Register. In 2019, the local congregation of the Evangelical Presbyterian Church in England and Wales signed a 150-year lease for All Saints. After a comprehensive restoration project, worship services as All Saints' Presbyterian Church began in October, 2019. The minister is the Revd Benjamin Wontrop. In addition to two Sunday services, the church runs a mid-week Bible study. It is also open for self-guided tours weekly on Thursdays from 1-4pm and at various points in the year.
