= Jennifer Selby =

Canadian scholar

- Education: Harvard University (Postdoctoral Fellowship); McMaster University (PhD); Queen's University (MA); University of Winnipeg (BA)
- Awards: Fulbright Fellowship
- Scientific career
- Fields: secular politics, women in Islam, gender studies, religious law
- Institutions: Memorial University of Newfoundland
- Thesis: The Shifting Boundaries of Gender Politics and Laicite: An Ethnography of First-generation Muslim Maghrebian Women in a Parisian banlieue (2007)
- Doctoral advisor: Ellen Badone
- Website: https://www.mun.ca/relstudies/people/jselby.php

Jennifer A. Selby is a Canadian scholar and Associate Professor of Religious Studies at Memorial University of Newfoundland. She is known for her research on secularism, women in Islam, gender studies and religious law. Selby won a Fulbright Fellowship in 2007 and 2016.

== Books ==
- Questioning French Secularism: Gender Politics and Islam in a Parisian Suburb, Palgrave Macmillan Press, 2012
- Debating Sharia: Islam, Gender Politics and Family Law Arbitration, co-edited with Anna C. Korteweg, University of Toronto Press, 2012
- Beyond Accommodation: Everyday Narratives of Muslim Canadians, with Amelie Barras and Lori G. Beaman, UBC Press, 2019
