= Selby-Bigge baronets =

Extinct baronetcy in the Baronetage of the United Kingdom

- Escutcheon of the Selby-Bigge baronets of King's Sutton
- Creation date: 1919
- Status: extinct
- Extinction date: 1973
- Motto: Fort et loyal, Strong and loyal

The Selby-Bigge Baronetcy, of King's Sutton in the County of Northampton, was a title in the Baronetage of the United Kingdom. It was created on 14 February 1919 for the civil servant and author Sir Amherst Selby-Bigge. He was Permanent Secretary to the Board of Education from 1911 to 1925. The title became extinct on the death of the second Baronet in 1973.

== Selby-Bigge baronets, of King's Sutton (1919) ==
- Sir (Lewis) Amherst Selby-Bigge, 1st Baronet (1860–1951)
- Sir John Amherst Selby-Bigge, 2nd Baronet (1892–1973)

== See also ==
- Selby baronets
- Selby family
