= Tenantry Column =

Monument in Alnwick, England

Coordinates: 55.4109°N 1.6989°W

The Tenantry Column, Alnwick

Panel on the west side of the base of the column

The Tenantry Column is a monument to the south of Alnwick town centre, in Northumberland, England. It was erected in 1816 by the tenants of Hugh Percy, 2nd Duke of Northumberland in thanks for his reduction of their rents during the post-Napoleonic depression. It is a Doric column standing 83 feet (25 m) tall and surmounted by a lion en passant, the symbol of the Percy family. Four more lions stand on a platform at the base of the column. A muster roll of the Percy Tenantry Volunteers was sealed into the foundation. The structure was granted protection as a listed building in 1952 and since 1977 has been listed in the highest category, grade I.

== Description ==
The Doric column is 83 feet (25 m) tall and topped by the Percy Lion, symbol of the historic Percy family. The lion sits on top of a drum decorated with foliage and surmounted with an iron balcony. The lion's tail, unusually, is horizontal and is said to point towards Scotland but the reason why is not known. The lion, depicted en passant, points south.

The base of the column is surrounded by a circular granite platform of 90 feet (27 m) circumference, accessible by stairs. The platform is surrounded by four more lions, on black marble plinths, which look upon Alnwick. A panel on the west side of the base of the column is engraved "To Hugh, Duke of Northumberland K.G This column is Erected, Dedicated and Inscribed By a Grateful and United Tenantry Anno Domini MDCCCXVI". Panels on two other sides are marked with the Percy family motto "Esperance en dieu" (French: Hope is in God). The fourth side contains the entrance to the column's internal stair case. The platform was originally surrounded by railings, but these have been lost.

Buried in a cavity in the foundations is the regimental roll of the late Percy Tenantry Volunteers, written on vellum and sealed in a glass tube. In 1887 Alnwick's railway station was built near to the column. It is one of the first sights to greet visitors to Alnwick, arriving from the south.

== History ==
Designed by the Newcastle architect David Stephenson, the column was erected by the tenants of the second Duke of Northumberland in 1816 in thanks for a reduction in rents. The foundation stone for the column was laid on 1 July 1816, an event witnessed by a large audience. The ceremony was led by a band and flag bearers and attended by Stephenson (bearing a ceremonial silver trowel), the principal tenants and two clergymen. The 21 oldest of Percy's tenants ceremoniously used the trowel to lay the stone. The foundation stone was afterwards blessed and ceremonially doused with corn, wine and oil. The column was not completed until after the Duke's 10 July 1817 death and was instead presented to his son Hugh Percy, 3rd Duke of Northumberland. The stone for the column came from a nearby estate on Percy family land.

The Duke had doubled or tripled rents during the agricultural boom that accompanied the Napoleonic Wars but, in an unusual show of 19th-century aristocratic generosity, had agreed to reduce them during the post-Napoleonic depression. The reduction applied is said to have been 25%. Percy was one of the richest men in England at this time. A local legend, proved to be false, is that upon seeing that his tenants had money to pay for the structure the Duke raised his rents once more. The Percy Tenantry Volunteers was a 1,500-strong unit of the British Volunteer Corps that the Duke had raised, at his own expense, during the war to defend the north-east from a potential French invasion.

The column is also known as "The Farmer's Folly". It was granted protection as a listed building by Historic England on 20 February 1952: the listing was upgraded to the highest category, grade I, on 25 August 1977.

== See also ==
- Brizlee Tower - folly tower in Alnwick
- Camphill Column, Alnwick - 1814 column in Alnwick
- Lord Hill's Column - 1814-1816 doric column in Shrewsbury
