= Mark Selby (disambiguation) =

Mark Selby (born 1983) is an English professional snooker player.

Mark Selby may also refer to:

- Mark Selby (musician) (1961–2017), American blues rock singer-songwriter
- Marc Selby, fictional character on British soap opera Coronation Street

== See also ==
- Mark Selbee (1969–2014), American kickboxer
