= Biddlestone =

Village in Northumberland, England

Coordinates: 55.368°N 2.059°W

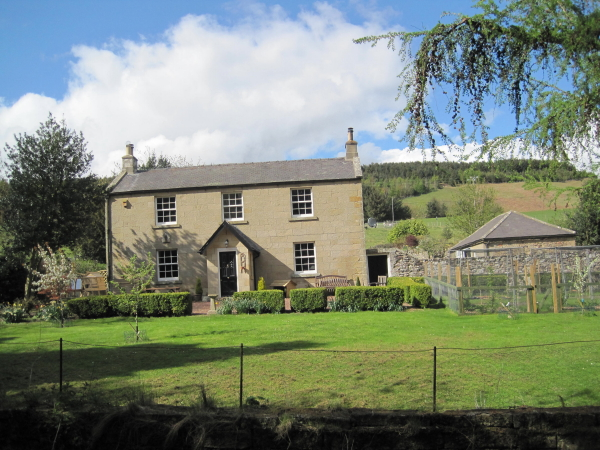
- Former priest's residence, Biddlestone

- Location within Northumberland
- Population: 177 (2011 census)
- OS grid reference: NT963081
- Civil parish: Biddlestone
- Unitary authority: Northumberland
- Ceremonial county: Northumberland
- Region: North East
- Country: England
- Sovereign state: United Kingdom
- Post town: MORPETH
- Postcode district: NE65
- Police: Northumbria
- Fire: Northumberland
- Ambulance: North East
- UK Parliament: Berwick-upon-Tweed

Biddlestone is a village and civil parish in Northumberland, England. It is about 14 miles (23 km) to the west of Alnwick. In the early 21st Century several of Northumberland's least populated parishes were merged to form slightly larger units. Biddlestone was merged with Alwinton, the enlarged parish having a population of 177 in 2011.

== Governance ==
Biddlestone is in the parliamentary constituency of Berwick-upon-Tweed.

== Landmarks ==
Biddlestone Roman Catholic Chapel is a Grade II* listed building, and is all that now remains of the former mansion Biddlestone Hall.
