= Selby family =

English gentry family

Coat of arms of the Selby baronets of Whitehouse (1664)

The Selby family, of English gentry, originated in Selby, Yorkshire, but largely settled in Northumberland. At various points through history, the family owned Biddlestone Hall and Twizell Castle in Northumberland in addition to the Manor House of Ightham Mote in Kent. The family had two baronetcies; the Selby and the Selby-Bigge but both are now extinct.

The following are some of the more important branches of the family, several of which are interconnected by marriage between cousins:

== Selby of Biddlestone ==
Biddlestone is a small village in the parish of Alwinton, Northumberland, on the fringe of the Northumberland National Park.

The Selbys were granted the manor of Biddlestone in 1272. In 1346, Sir Walter Selby of Biddlestone, Royal Constable and Governor of the castle at Liddel Mote was captured by the Scots whilst defending the castle and he and two sons were executed.

A fortified manor house was recorded at Biddlestone in 1415 and a survey in 1541 disclosed a pele tower with a barmkin in good repair in the ownership of Percival Selby. In 1715, the house was described as in the ownership of Thomas Selby and comprised a cruciform four winged structure with a central battlemented tower.

The family were Catholics with Jacobite sympathies. Ephraim Selby was involved in an uprising at Rothbury in 1715.

In 1796, a later Thomas Selby replaced the old house with a much grander structure which became known as Biddlestone Hall. The new house was remodelled by architect John Dobson in 1820 to incorporate a private Catholic chapel.

The Biddlestone estate was sold by Walter Selby to the Forestry Commission in 1914 and the Hall was demolished in 1957. The chapel however was preserved and still stands as a Grade II* listed building. The arms of the Selby family, (Barry of eight, or and sable), are depicted in stained glass in the chapel.

== Selby of Newcastle and Whitehouse ==
Anthony Selby of Selby, Yorkshire moved to Newcastle upon Tyne, Northumberland and his son Walter (b. 1444) married into the prominent Brandling of Newcastle family. Other marriages to Anderson and Fenwick further established the standing of the Selbys.

George Selby (1506–1552) married Margaret Anderson. He was a Merchant Adventurer in Newcastle and a memorial to him stands in St Nicholas Church, Newcastle.

Marriages between members of the different branches of the Selby family were not uncommon. In 1602 George Selby of Newcastle married Margaret Selby of Twizell Castle. In 1600, he became Mayor of Newcastle, an honour he received on three further occasions. He was knighted in 1606, was High Sheriff of Northumberland in 1608 and Deputy Lieutenant of the county in 1611.

Shortly thereafter he acquired an estate at Whitehouse, Ryton, County Durham. He was elected Member of Parliament for Northumberland in 1614 but his election was rejected by the House of Commons as by then he had lost his residential and property owning qualification in Northumberland. He was appointed High Sheriff of Durham in 1624.

George Selby (b. 1627) became the first of the Selby baronets in 1664 but the baronetcy was short-lived. It became extinct when both the first and second baronets died in the month of September 1688.

== Selby of Twizell Castle ==
A pele tower at Branxton, Northumberland then in the county of Islandshire, owned by William Selby was destroyed by the Scots in 1496 and was rebuilt by his son John (d 1565). It did not remain the main family home as William had purchased Twizell Castle from Heron in 1520 and that estate was developed in preference to Branxton.

John Selby was Gentleman Porter of Berwick Castle as was his son John who was knighted by Elizabeth I in 1582. Sir John Selby died in 1595 and an inventory was made of his goods at Twizell and elsewhere. Sir John's son, Sir William Selby (d. 1612) was also Gentleman Porter of Berwick and Member of Parliament for that city in 1592, 1597, and 1601. Sir William inherited the Twizell estate on the death of his father in 1595 and also purchased the estate of Ightham Mote, in Kent in 1592. His estates went to his nephew William Selby (died 1638), and on his death his northern estate passed to his brother Sir Ralph Selby (d. 1646).

Sir Ralph's granddaughter married a Selby cousin from Cornhill and Twizell remained with that junior branch until sold in 1685 to Sir Francis Blake.

== Selby of Ightham Mote, Kent ==
Sir William Selby (d. 1611) of Twizell bought Ightham Mote in 1591 and on his death in 1611 bequeathed it to his nephew, also Sir William Selby (d. 1637) of Twizell Castle.

In 1644, the estate came into the ownership of a nephew, George Selby of London, who was appointed High Sheriff of Kent in 1648.

In the 18th century, the estate passed via the female line when Dorothy Selby married John Browne. On the death of the 9th Viscount Montague in 1797 the Browne successors and descendant Thomas Selby of Ightham made an unsuccessful claim to the Viscountcy.

The marriage of Lewis Marianne Selby of Beal into the Bigge family in 1833 led to the creation of Selby-Bigge (see Selby-Bigge baronets) and the estate remained in the family until sold in 1889 to Sir Thomas Colyer-Fergusson.

In 1865, Elizabeth Selby of Ightham (1839–1906) married William Court Gully who upon accession to the Peerage took the title Viscount Selby.

== Selby of Beal ==
Grindon Rigg, Northumberland was in the possession of Roger Selby in 1512 and John Selby in 1545. Oliver Selby, son of John, purchased half of the Manor of Beal, Northumberland in 1588 and land at neighbouring Lowlin in 1629. His brother William married Agnes Selby of Twizell Castle.

The Selbys moved from Beal when George Selby (1724–1804) bought Twizell House,( not to be confused with Twizell Castle), Addestone, near Bambrough. His son Prideaux John Selby (1789–1867), was an eminent naturalist who improved the Twizell property and sold the Beal estate in 1850. His daughter Lewis Marianne married Charles Bigge (1803–1846) son of Charles William Bigge in 1833. After his death she remarried Robert Luard at Ightham Mote in 1850.

For later descendants see Selby-Bigge baronets.

Twizell House was demolished in 1969.

== Selby of Holy Island and Swansfield ==
Richard Selby (d 1690) of Beal, purchased property on Holy Island in the 17th century. His grandson son George married a daughter of Prideaux Selby of Beal. A great-grandson, also named Prideaux Selby (1747–1813) became a colonial administrator in Canada, Another great-grandson Henry Collingwood Selby (d 1839) bought an estate at Swansfield, near Alnwick where he built Swansfield House to a design by architect John Dobson in 1823. The house was demolished in 1975. Selby also commissioned the Camphill Column, possibly as a reaction to locals thought to be supportive of the French Revolution.

A later Prideaux Selby of Swansfield, a barrister, High Sheriff and Deputy Lieutenant of Northumberland, was also of Pawston.

== Selby of Pawston ==
Gerard Selby of Branxton, Northumberland purchased the neighbouring village of Pawston, Northumberland ( sometimes referred to as Paston) and built there a pele tower of which he was in occupation in 1541. The property was replaced with a manor house known as Pawston Hall in the 18th century.

The Selbys prospered there for over three hundred years.

By 1860, ownership of the estate had passed to the Beal/Holy Island branch of the family whose Prideaux Selby (1810–1872) had married in 1840 Sir Thomas Beauchamp-Proctor. On his death the estate passed to his son Beauchamp Proctor Selby .

Pawston Hall was later demolished

== Notable people in history ==
- Charles August Selby (1755–1823), English-Danish merchant and landowner
- George Selby (1557–1625), English politician
- Prideaux Selby (1747–1813), English soldier and political figure in Upper Canada
- Prideaux John Selby (1788–1867), English ornithologist, botanist and artist and landowner
- Robert of Selby (died 1152), Englishman, courtier of Roger II of Sicily and chancellor of the Kingdom of Sicily
- William Selby (died 1638), MP for Northumberland
- William Selby (1738–1798), British-American composer, organist and choirmaster
