= Selby Ash =

English cricketer

Personal information
- Full name: Selby Attree Horne Ash
- Born: c. 1836; Ditchling, Sussex
- Died: 8 September 1870 (aged 33–34); Elham, Kent
- Source: Cricinfo, 1 April 2017

Selby Attree Horne Ash (c. 1836 – 8 September 1870) was an English cricketer. He played one first-class match for Cambridge University Cricket Club in 1858.

Ash was educated at Tonbridge School and Jesus College, Cambridge. He graduated from Cambridge University with a Bachelor of Arts degree in 1859, and was curate of Hadleigh, Suffolk from 1861 to 1863.

== See also ==
- List of Cambridge University Cricket Club players
