= Selby baronets =

Extinct baronetcy in the Baronetage of England

The Selby Baronetcy, of Whitehouse in the County of Durham, was a title in the Baronetage of England. It was created on 3 March 1664 for George Selby, of Whitehouse, Ryton, County Durham. The title became extinct on the death of the second Baronet, who only held the baronetcy for one hour, in 1668.

Escutcheon of the Selby baronets of Whitehouse

== Selby of Whitehouse (1664) ==
- Sir George Selby, 1st Baronet (1627–1668)
- Sir George Selby, 2nd Baronet (died 1668)

== See also ==
- Selby family
- Selby-Bigge baronets
