= Gray Selby =

American farmer, teacher and state legislator in Mississippi

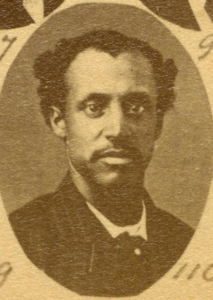

Gray C. Selby (born c. 1853) was a farmer, teacher, and state legislator in Mississippi. He represented Marshall County, Mississippi in the Mississippi House of Representatives in 1880 and 1881.

He served with Confederate Army veteran, teacher, lawyer, civil engineer and surveyor Elias Jackson Marett, Winfield S. Featherston, and S. W. Mullins. A “Colored” Republican, he was reported to have fled to Arkansas due to intimidation.

== See also ==
- African American officeholders from the end of the Civil War until before 1900
