= Bill Selby =

American baseball player (born 1970)

- Utility player
- Born: June 11, 1970 (age 55); Monroeville, Alabama, U.S.
- Batted: Left Threw: Right

Professional debut
- MLB: April 19, 1996, for the Boston Red Sox
- NPB: April 4, 1997, for the Yokohama BayStars

Last appearance
- MLB: May 25, 2003, for the Cleveland Indians
- NPB: 1997, for the Yokohama BayStars

MLB statistics
- Batting average: .223
- Home runs: 11
- Runs batted in: 48
- Stats at Baseball Reference

Teams
- Boston Red Sox (1996); Yokohama BayStars (1997); Cleveland Indians (2000); Cincinnati Reds (2001); Cleveland Indians (2002–2003)

William Frank Selby (born June 11, 1970) is an American former utility player from 1996 to 2003 with the Boston Red Sox, Cincinnati Reds, and Cleveland Indians. He also played one season in Japan for the Yokohama BayStars in 1997. Selby played in 198 total MLB games, with a .223 career batting average. Mostly used off the bench, Selby hit a career high 6 home runs in 2002 with the Indians. The most dramatic of those home runs came on July 14, when he hit a walk-off grand slam against Mariano Rivera to defeat the New York Yankees, 10–7, in the bottom of the 9th inning. It was the first walk-off home run that Rivera had allowed in his career.

Bill Selby became the sixth player in (Triple-A team) Buffalo Bisons club history to be inducted into the Buffalo Baseball Hall of Fame on August 25, 2007. In the Bisons' modern era, Selby ranks first in hits (378), doubles (90), RBI (245) and runs (217). He's second in games played (370) and third in home runs (60). Selby was the team's MVP in 1999 (.295, 20 homers, 85 RBI) and played in the 2000 Triple-A All-Star Game in Rochester, New York.

== "Selby is God" fans ==
While playing minor league baseball for the Pawtucket Red Sox in 1996, during an away game in Columbus, Ohio, Selby was introduced to three Ohio State University students (and Cleveland Indians fans) who became very vocal fans. Two days later, Selby was called up to the parent Boston club, playing in Cleveland, and he had a base hit that Friday evening against Cleveland closer José Mesa. The three fans made the trip that weekend and debuted a large cardboard sign that read, merely, "Selby is God." (The sign is an homage to a previous "Bernie is God" sign that honored Cowboy QB (and ex-Cleveland Browns legend) Bernie Kosar.)

The "Selby is God" fans received some notoriety after Selby's grand slam off Rivera in 2002, appearing in The Plain Dealer and on television.

== Nicknaming Travis Hafner ==
Selby is also known for bestowing Cleveland Indians DH Travis Hafner with his nickname, "Pronk". Selby explained the nickname to the Buffalo News:

Texas came to town in 2002 and I was with [former Indian] Lee Stevens on the bench saying, 'This dude is unbelievable. He's a real project.' He was hitting the ball everywhere. We got him the next spring and we called him 'Project' all the time. One day I passed him, and said, 'What's up, you big donkey?' He said, 'Hey, I can't be the Project and the Donkey.'
So we started going with 'Pronkey'. In Spanish, we made it 'El Pronko.' Then it got down to 'The Pronk' and finally just 'Pronk.' It fits him. He doesn't look like Shrek or anything else. He just looks like a Pronk.
