= Ken Selby =

American restaurateur and educator (1936–2012)

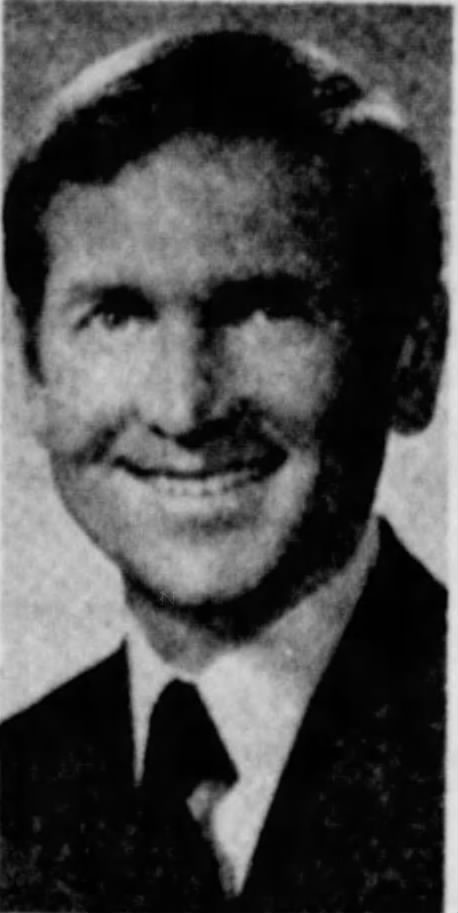
- Selby, c. 1977
- Born: John Kenneth Selby; May 12, 1936; Milburn, Oklahoma, US
- Died: May 12, 2012 (aged 76)
- Education: Northeastern State University
- Occupations: Teacher; Restaurateur
- Years active: 1961–2012
- Known for: Founder of Mazzio's
- Spouse: Debra Selby
- Children: 5

John Kenneth Selby (May 12, 1936 – May 12, 2012) was an American restaurateur and educator who founded the Mazzio's chain of restaurants. Selby started out as a junior high science teacher before pursuing his business interests.

== Early life ==
Selby was born on May 12, 1936, in Milburn, Oklahoma, to "Depression-era parents". His mother was a schoolteacher while his father worked in an oil field. Selby attended the school his mother taught at, which at the time was a "two teacher" school where Selby's mother taught grades 1 through 12.

His family moved to Durant when he was 13. During this time he worked in a country store as a meat market trainee before attaining status as an assistant butcher. His family would later move to Sapulpa and Selby would graduate from Sapulpa High School.

Selby attended Northeastern State University where he graduated with a Chemistry degree in 1958. During his time at NSU he was on an athletic scholarship, but "bombed" as an athlete. He also pursued graduate studies at the University of Tulsa in 1960 and 1961.

Selby's first exposure to pizza was during his time in college. He worked two summer jobs in Chicago with a friend to afford his education. He had his first bite of pizza at a Chicago drug store in 1956, immediately falling in love with the taste.

== Career ==
=== Teaching ===
After graduating from Northeastern State, Selby began working as a science teacher. Selby taught in Granby immediately after graduating before relocating to Tulsa to teach at Lowell Junior High School and Monroe Junior High.

=== Pizza Parlor and Ken's Pizza ===
While teaching, Selby began working at a Pizza Hut over the summer after a friend encouraged him. He quickly rose to a manager position and stayed in that role for over a year and a half. It was while working at Pizza Hut that Selby got the idea to open a restaurant of his own.

On November 1, 1961, Selby opened the "Pizza Parlor," what would become the predecessor of Mazzio's. It was located across the street from the University of Tulsa campus in an old vacuum sweeper shop. His pizzas at the time were noted for their thin crust and spicy sauce. Selby supported himself by works as a teacher at Lowell Junior High throughout the day and cooking at his restaurant at night.

The name of the restaurant changed to "Ken's Pizza" when Selby opened up a second location in Enid a few years later. The opening of the second location went awry when the store's oven malfunctioned. Selby had to drive to Oklahoma City to purchase a new oven the next day. By 1975, the business had expanded to 100 company and franchise locations.

=== Mazzio's and other ventures ===
Towards the end of the 1970s, Selby began developing a casual dining concept expanding on his restaurant model at the time. The concept was created in part to compete with the rise of Godfather's Pizza outlets. This is what would turn into Mazzio's. The first Mazzio's location opened in 1979 to financial success. The name came from "Maggio," the character Frank Sinatra plays in the movie From Here to Eternity. To settle copyright issues, the company settled on the name "Mazzio" instead. By 1994 there were 230 different Mazzio's locations.

Selby pursued other restaurant chains outside of Mazzio's. In 1984, Selby created "Scooter's Pizza," a pizza place specializing in delivery. Later in the 1990s Selby wanted to expand into the casual Italian dining market. In 1994, he opened up Zio's Italian Kitchen in south Tulsa. Mazzio's LLC also owned Oliveto Italian Bistro, which first opened in August 2008.

== Personal life and death ==
In 2009, Selby walked from Oklahoma City to Tulsa along Route 66 at the age of 73. His destination in Tulsa was the site of the original Ken's Pizza location.

Selby served on various boards throughout Tulsa, including the Indian Nations Boy Scouts of America, Hillcrest Medical Center foundation, and the Salvation Army advisory board. Selby was also an advocate for smoke-free restaurants. Both Mazzio's and Zio's Italian Kitchen banned smoking in 2002, and Selby advocated for a bill in 2010 in the State legislature that would make all restaurants across Oklahoma smoke-free.

Selby died on May 12, 2012, his 76th birthday, after complications associated with lung cancer. Selby had been married to Debra (Debbie) Selby, and had five children and seven grandchildren.
