= Thomas Selby (cricketer, born 1791) =

English cricketer

Thomas Selby (4 November 1791 – 7 May 1874) was an English cricketer. He was born in Gillingham, Kent, and died on 7 May 1874 at Boulogne-sur-Mer in France. He played on the Kent cricket team from 1839 to 1841.

== Bibliography ==
- Carlaw, Derek (2020). Kent County Cricketers, A to Z: Part One (1806–1914) (PDF). Cardiff: ACS.
