= SportsBooks Limited =

UK publishing house

SportsBooks Limited is a small, independent publishing house based in York in the United Kingdom and specialising in books on sport.

== Origins ==
SportsBooks was established in 1995 by Randall Northam, the former sports editor of United Newspapers and athletics correspondent of the Daily Express, primarily to publish the International Track and Field Annual for the Association of Track and Field Statisticians.

In 2000, SportsBooks started publishing other books. SportsBooks has become known for publishing books outside the mainstream. Jon Culley, of The Independent, said they were part of "an alternative school of sports literature", while Frank Keating in The Guardian, said they were "ever-diligent" and "off-beat".

== Authors ==
Authors published by SportsBooks Limited include: Phil Tufnell (former England international cricketer, and winner of ITV's I'm a Celebrity...Get Me Out of Here!), Willie Irvine (former Northern Ireland international football player), Peter Matthews (BBC athletics commentator), Mike Collett (sports editor of Reuters new agency), Glen Isherwood (statistician of Wembley Stadium) and Andrew Godsell (football and general historian).

== Award nominations ==
Local Heroes, the story of the only Derbyshire team to win cricket's County Championship, was shortlisted for The Cricket Society's Book of the Year Award in 2007. In 2008 SportsBooks won the award with "George Lohmann – pioneer professional" by Keith Booth.

== See also ==
- Sports Journalism
