= William Blackett =

William Blackett may refer to:

- Sir William Blackett, 1st Baronet, of Newcastle (1620–1680), English merchant and MP
- Sir William Blackett, 1st Baronet, of Newcastle-upon-Tyne (1657–1705), English MP, son of the above
- Sir William Blackett, 2nd Baronet (1690–1728), English MP, son of the above
- Sir William Blackett, 5th Baronet (1759–1816), British baronet

== See also ==
- Blackett (surname)
