= Edward Blackett =

Edward Blackett may refer to:

- Sir Edward Blackett, 2nd Baronet (1649–1718), English landowner and politician
- Sir Edward Blackett, 3rd Baronet (1683–1756), English Navy captain
- Sir Edward Blackett, 4th Baronet (1719–1804), baronet and member of the British House of Commons for Northumberland
- Sir Edward Blackett, 6th Baronet (1805–1885), English soldier and civil servant
- Sir Edward Blackett, 7th Baronet (1831–1909), English soldier and aide-de-camp to Queen Victoria
