= William Forster (MP for Northumberland) =

English Tory politician (1667–1700)

William Forster (28 July 1667 – 1 September 1700) was an English Tory politician.

== Biography ==
Forster was the eldest son of Sir William Forster of Bamburgh Castle and Dorothy, daughter and heiress of Sir William Selby of Twizell. His younger brother was Ferdinando Forster.

Forster was elected to the House of Commons of England as a Tory Member of Parliament for Northumberland at the 1689 English general election. He was an inactive member of the Convention Parliament, but was named to three committees. After he was returned as MP in 1690, he continued to be recorded as a Tory and court supporter by Lord Carmarthen. He was elected unopposed at the 1695 English general election. He initially refused to sign the Association of 1696 and on 25 November that year he voted against the attainder of Sir John Fenwick, 3rd Baronet. He was returned to parliament for a final time at the 1698 English general election and died two years later.

Parliament of England
Preceded by Sir John Fenwick, Bt; William Ogle	Member of Parliament for Northumberland; 1689–1700; With: Philip Bickerstaffe (1689–1698); Sir Edward Blackett, Bt (1698–1700)	Succeeded by Ferdinando Forster; Hon. William Howard
