= Sir William Blackett, 1st Baronet, of Newcastle-upon-Tyne =

British baronet and politician

Sir William Blackett, 1st Baronet (14 June 1657 – December 1705) was a landowner and politician who sat in the House of Commons in three periods between 1685 and 1705.

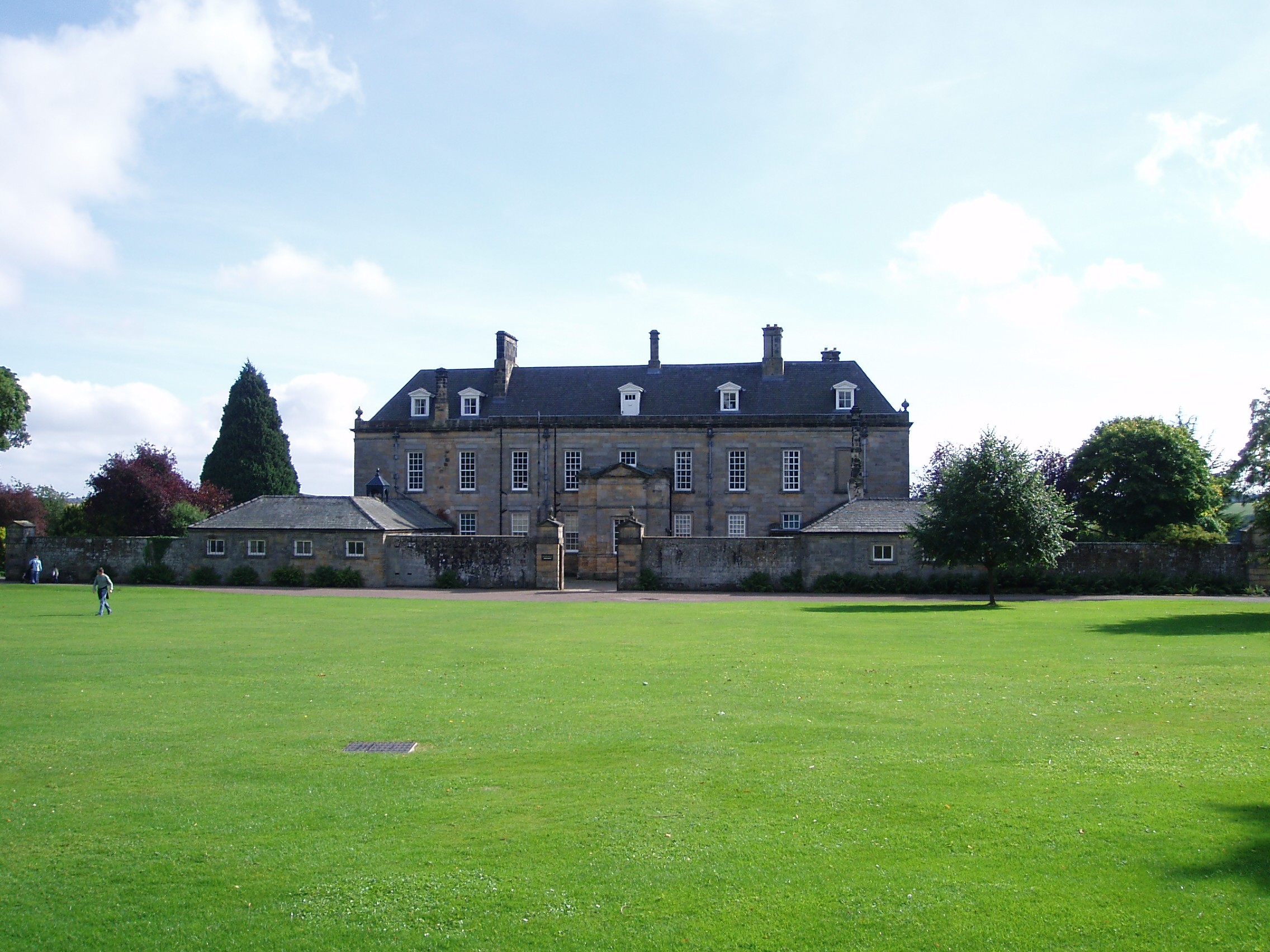
Wallington Hall, Cambo

Blackett was the third son of Sir William Blackett, 1st Baronet and his wife Elizabeth Kirkly. He was left a fortune by his father in 1680 and followed his father's footsteps and became Mayor of Newcastle-upon-Tyne in 1683.

In 1685 Blackett became Member of Parliament for Newcastle-upon-Tyne and in the same year the Baronetcy of Newcastle-upon-Tyne was created for him. His elder brother Edward inherited his father's title.

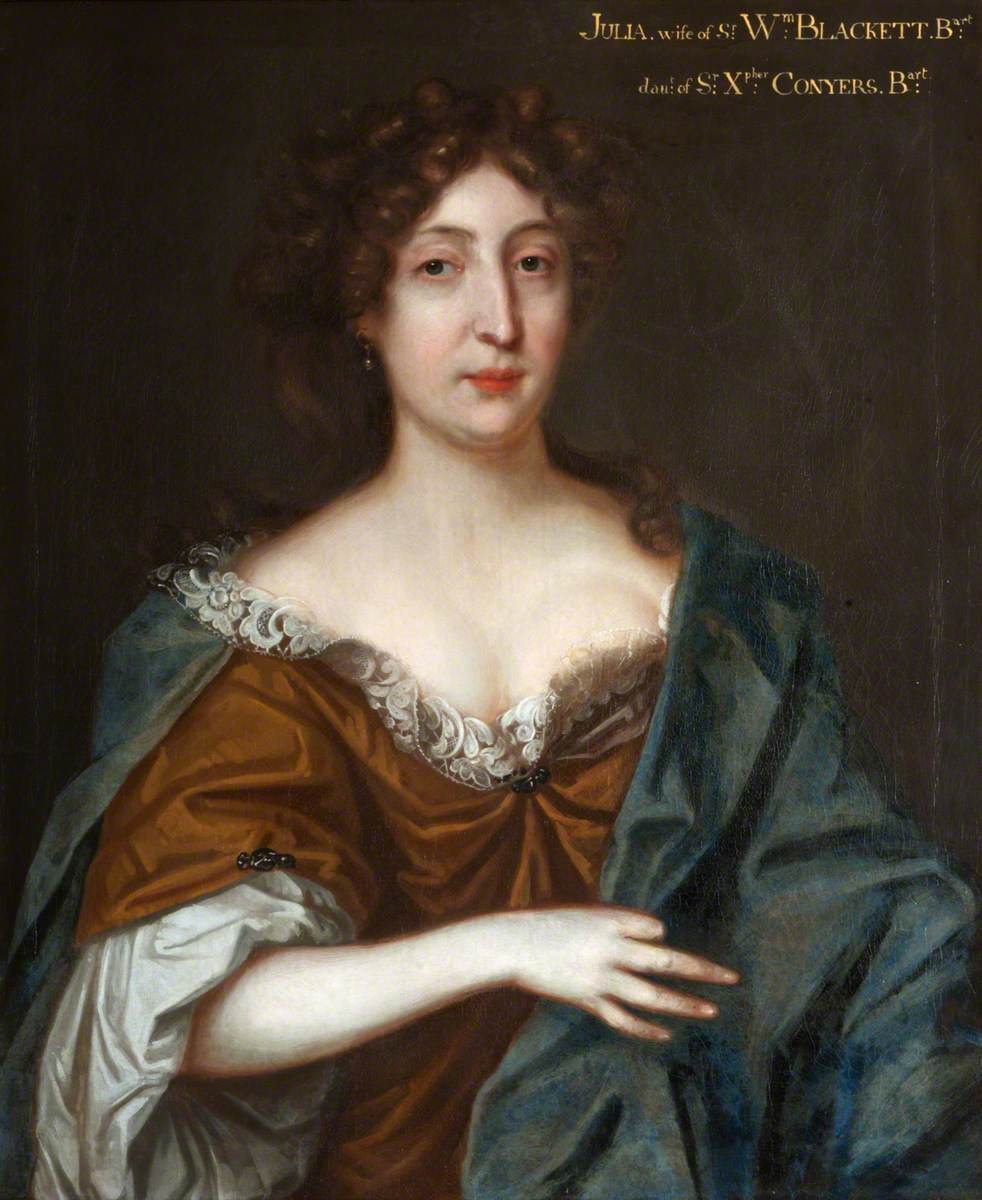
Julia, Lady Blackett

Blackett was High Sheriff of Northumberland in 1688 and in 1689 he acquired large parts of the Allendale estate from the impoverished Sir John Fenwick. Here he developed considerable lead and coal mining interests. He also bought Wallington Hall, Cambo, Northumberland from Fenwick and substantially rebuilt it. He developed Wallington more as a shooting lodge and the main family seat remained in Newcastle, the house there being occupied until 1783.

Blackett lost his seat in Parliament at Newcastle in 1690 and regained it in 1695. He lost the seat again in 1700 and was re-elected in 1705. He was esteemed a man of strict propriety and was distinguished as an orator in the House of Commons.

Blackett married Julia Conyers, daughter of Sir Christopher Conyers, 2nd Baronet of Horden, in 1684 and was succeeded by their son William.

Parliament of England
Preceded by Sir Ralph Carr; Sir Nathaniel Johnson	Member of Parliament for Newcastle-upon-Tyne; 1685–1690; With: Sir Nathaniel Johnson 1685–1689; Sir Ralph Carr 1689–1690	Succeeded by Sir Ralph Carr; William Carr
Preceded by Sir Ralph Carr; William Carr	Member of Parliament for Newcastle-upon-Tyne; 1695–1700; With: William Carr	Succeeded by William Carr; Sir Henry Liddell, Bt
Preceded by William Carr; Sir Henry Liddell, Bt	Member of Parliament for Newcastle-upon-Tyne; June – December 1705; With: William Carr	Succeeded by William Carr; Sir Henry Liddell, Bt
Baronetage of England
New creation	Baronet (of Newcastle); 1685–1705	Succeeded by William Blackett
