= St Aidan's Church, Bamburgh =

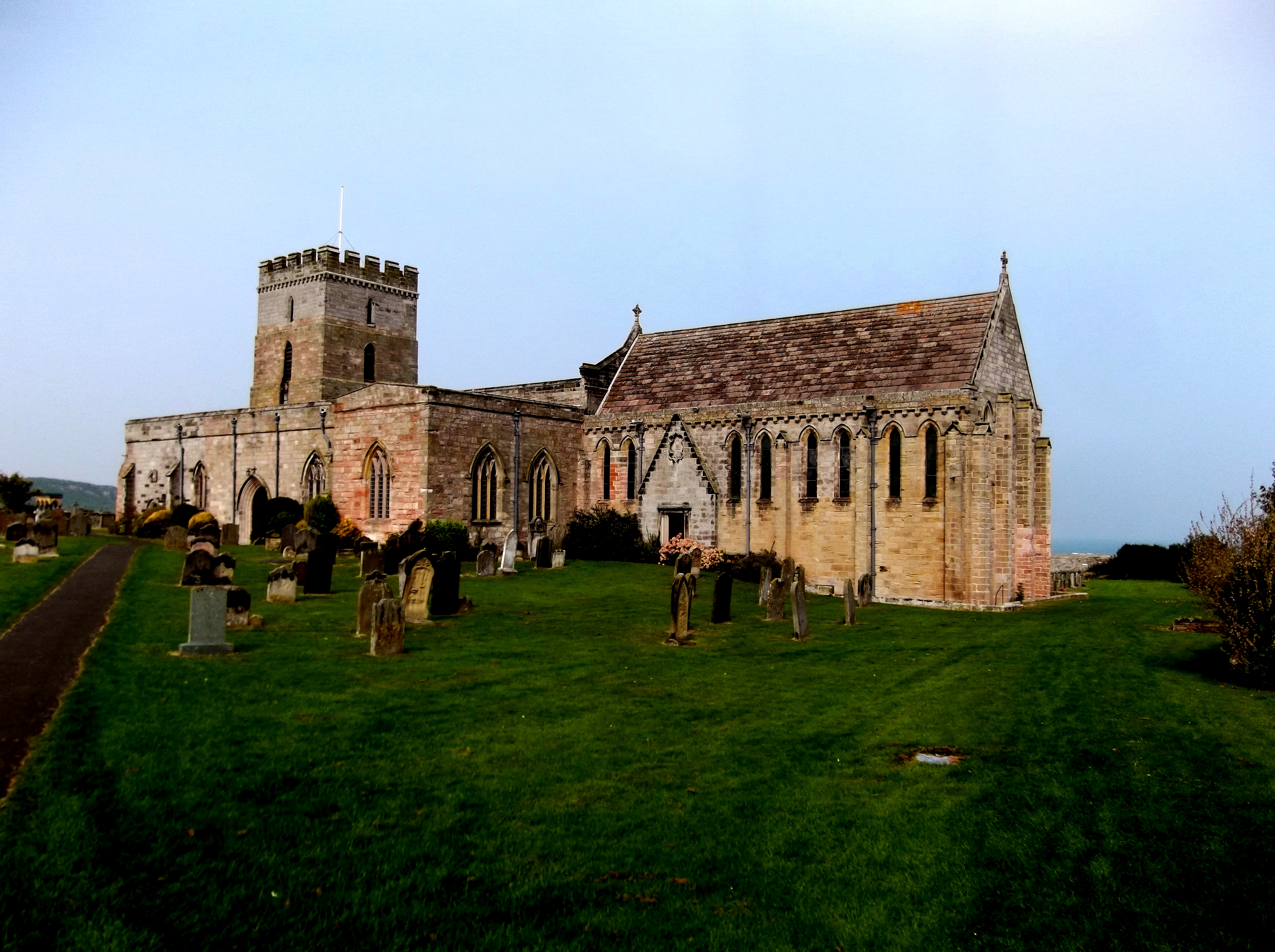
- St Aidan's Church, Bamburgh
- St Aidan's Church, Bamburgh
- 55°36′29.17″N 1°43′5.61″W
- Location: Radcliffe Road, Bamburgh, Northumberland NE69 7AB
- Country: England
- Denomination: Church of England

History
- Dedication: St Aidan

Architecture
- Heritage designation: Grade I listed

Administration
- Diocese: Diocese of Newcastle
- Archdeaconry: Lindisfarne
- Deanery: Bamburgh & Glendale
- Parish: Bamburgh

Clergy
- Vicar: The Reverend Louise Taylor-Kenyon

St Aidan's Church is a Grade I listed Church of England building in the Diocese of Newcastle.

== History ==
According to Bede, St Aidan built a wooden church outside the castle wall, on the site of the current church, in AD 635, and he died here in AD 652; (a wooden beam preserved inside the church is traditionally said to be the one on which he rested as he died).

The present church dates from the late 12th century (though some pre-conquest stonework survives in the north aisle). The chancel, said to be the second longest in the country (60 ft), was added in 1230; it contains an 1895 reredos in Caen stone by W.S. Hicks, depicting northern saints of the 7th and 8th centuries.

Note that after the Dissolution of the Monasteries in the mid 1500s, the monks were forced to leave. After the Reformation, St Aidan's became the parish church for the village but its maintenance was neglected; by 1600, it was in poor condition. Repairs were eventually completed. Over the subsequent centuries additional repairs were undertaken, including significant restorations during the 1800s, the last one in 1895.

The church's crypt holds the remains of 110 individuals who died in the 7th and 8th century; they had originally been buried in the castle's Bowl Hole graveyard. The remains were found during a project between 1998 and 2007. Finally, in 2016, they were moved into the crypt. Since November 2019, the crypt can be viewed by visitors through a small gate. An interpretive display and digital ossuary are also available for visitors as "Accessing Aidan"; they are managed by the Bamburgh Bones consortium: the Bamburgh Heritage Trust, St. Aidan's Parochial Church Council, Northumberland Coast AONB Partnership and Northumberland County Council.

== Memorials ==
The church contains a 14th-century tomb recess with an effigy of a Knight. There are wall monuments to: Sir Claudius Forster, 1st Baronet of 1623, the Forster family (including brothers William Forster and Ferdinando Forster) of 1711, the Sharpe memorial 1839 by Chantrey.

The north aisle contains an effigy of local heroine Grace Darling dating from 1844 by Charles Raymond Smith. This formed part of the original Monument to Grace Darling in the churchyard but was later replaced due to deterioration of the stonework. The memorial is placed so that it can be seen by passing ships, and is by Anthony Salvin and Charles Raymond Smith, 1844.

The churchyard contains one Commonwealth war grave, of an airman of World War II.

The church also holds a brass plaque to historian Arthur Lionel Smith and a memorial to Major General George Younghusband.

== Organ ==
The church had a two manual pipe organ by Harrison and Harrison dating from 1883. A specification of the organ can be found on the National Pipe Organ Register.

== Gallery ==
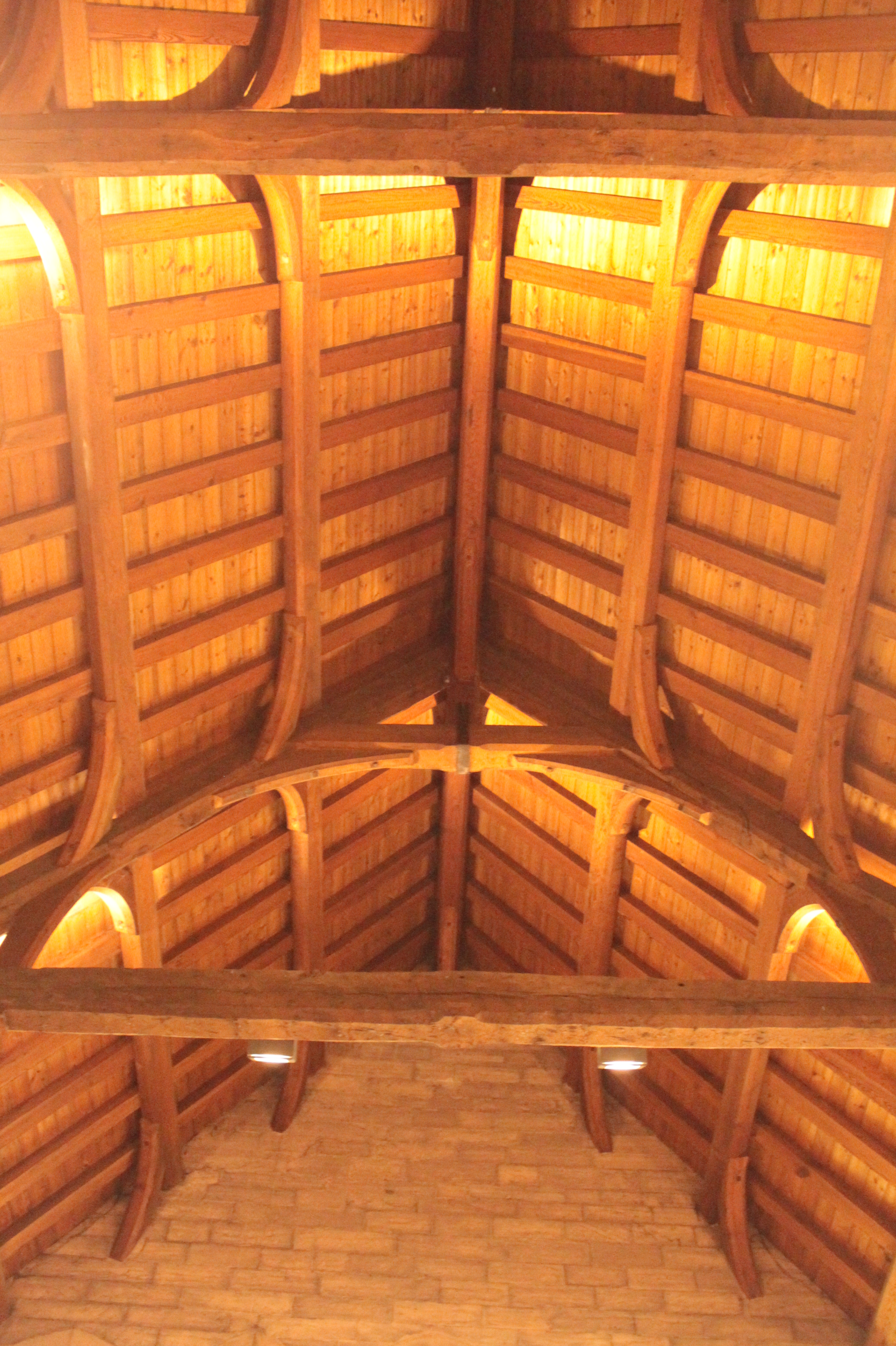
Saxon style timber roof structure inside St Aidan's Church in Bamburgh

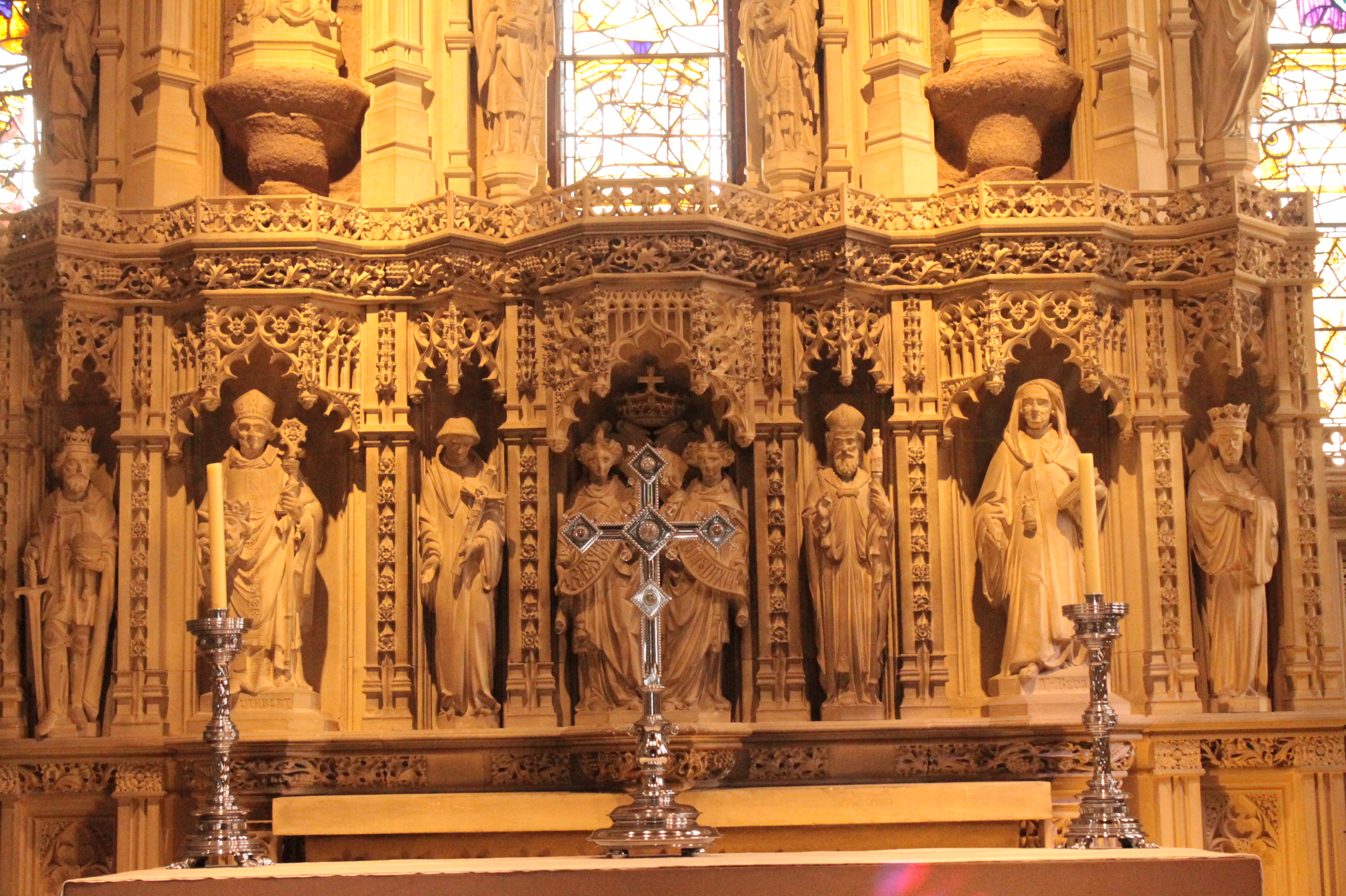
Reredos, St Aidan's Church, Bamburgh

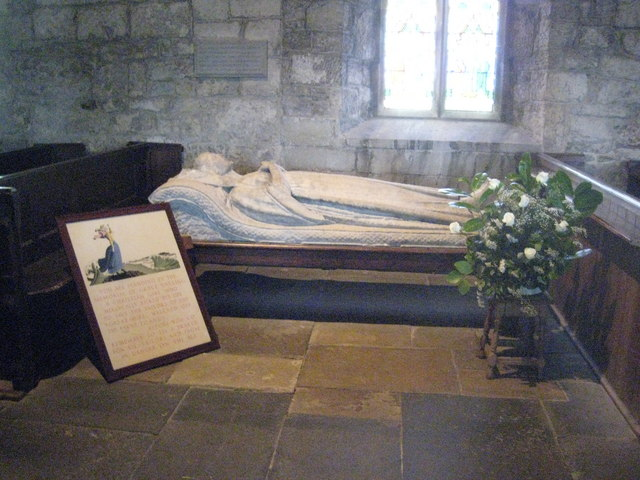
Grace Darling memorial in the church of 1844 by Charles Raymond Smith

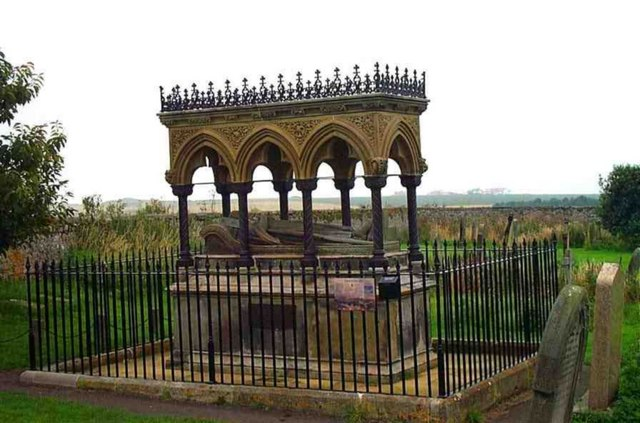
Monument to Grace Darling in the churchyard by Anthony Salvin and Charles Raymond Smith
