= Blanchland Abbey =

Monastery in Blanchland, Northumberland, England

Coordinates: 54°50′58″N 2°3′21″W

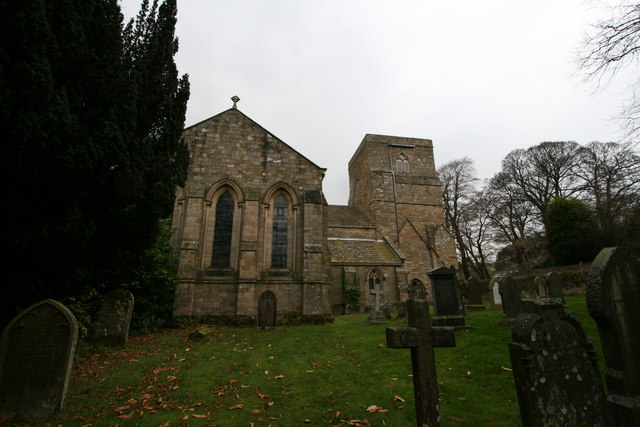
Blanchland Abbey

Blanchland Abbey at Blanchland, in the English county of Northumberland, was founded as a premonstratensian priory in 1165 by Walter de Bolbec II, and was a daughter house of Croxton Abbey in Leicestershire. It became an abbey in the late 13th century. The 16th century former Abbot's house (now The Lord Crewe Arms Hotel) is a Grade II* listed building and the whole site is a Scheduled Ancient Monument.

== The Anglo-Scottish wars ==
The abbey granges were pillaged during the Anglo-Scots wars, particularly in 1327, but the abbey itself was apparently left unscathed. However, there is a legend that during one raid in the area, the monks prayed that the abbey would be spared. Subsequently, a mist descended, shielding the valley and monastery from view, and the Scottish raiders passed by without noticing it. The foolish monks, upon hearing this, proceeded to ring the abbey bells to signal to everyone in the valley that it was safe and that the invaders had passed. During their celebration of bell-ringing, the Scottish invaders heard the bells, turned around, and ransacked the monastery.

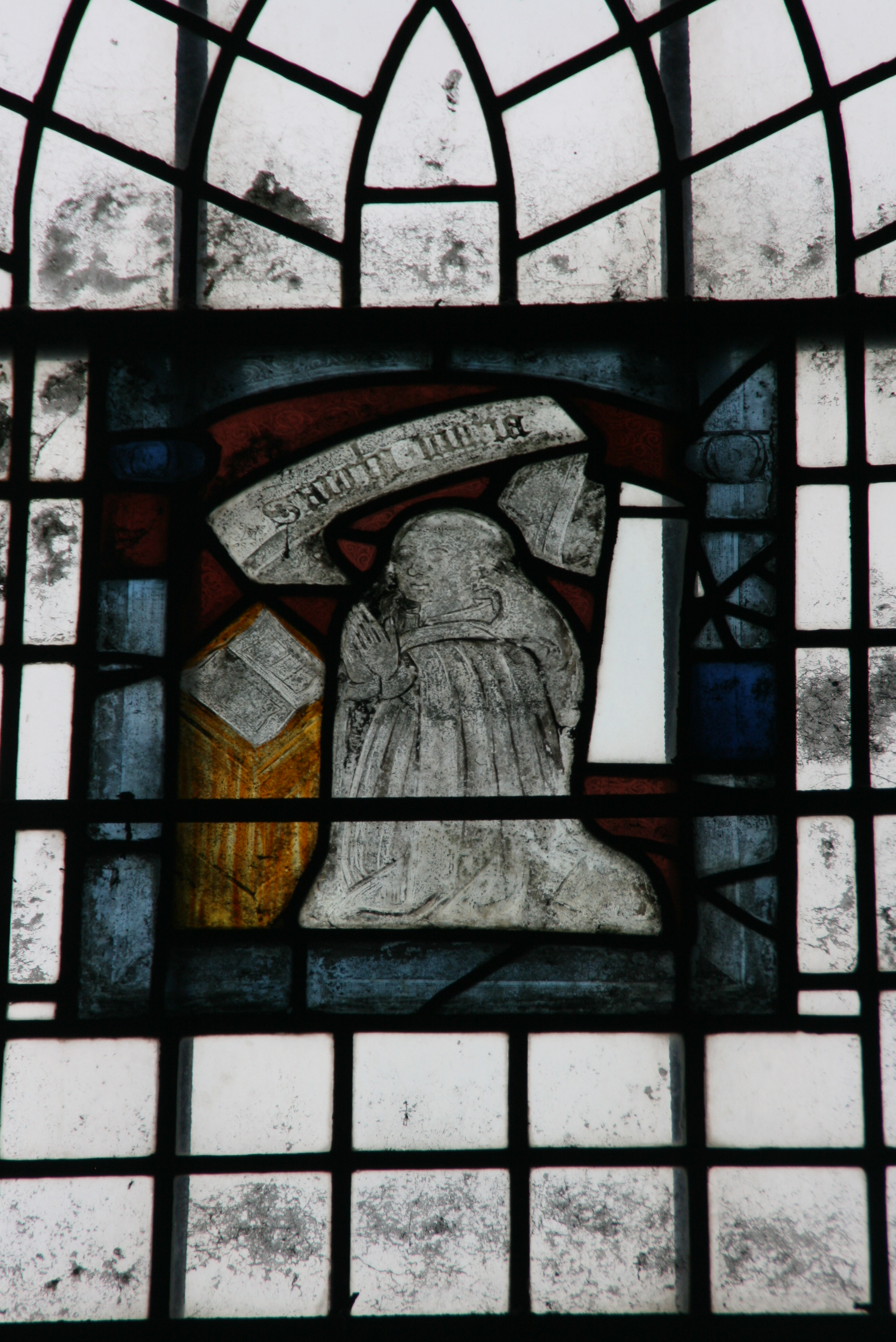
Premonstratension monk in abbey church

== The Dissolution and beyond ==
The abbey was dissolved in 1539 and granted to the Bellow and Broxholm families. It was later acquired by the Radclyffe family from whom it passed by marriage to Nicholas Forster. Part of the abbey church was altered and retained for use as the parish church, and the abbots' former residence became the manor house. In 1612, it was the residence of Sir Claudius Forster, High Sheriff of Northumberland.

When in 1701 Fernando Forster was murdered, the estate passed through to co-heirs: Dorothy (sister of Fernando) who had married Nathaniel Crew, 3rd Baron Crew, Bishop of Durham, and Thomas Forster of Adderstone, the son of her deceased sister Frances. The estate was however encumbered with debt. Lord Crew purchased all the Forster estates including Blanchland in 1704 for £20,697, sufficient to pay off the creditors. The Forster connection with Blanchland came to an end as a result of Thomas Forster's involvement in the Jacobite rising of 1715. On his death in 1721, Lord Crew left all his properties to be administered in trust for charitable purposes (Lord Crewe's Charity).

The abbey gatehouse survives and the stone houses surrounding the village square were partly constructed using stone from the monastery. The manor house became an inn, the Lord Crewe Arms, in the 1720s.

== See also ==
- Catholic Church in England

== Sources ==
- Grundy, John (2022). History of Northumberland. Newcastle upon Tyne: Tyne Bridge Publishing. ISBN 9781838280970.
