= Sir Claudius Forster, 1st Baronet =

Escutcheon of the Forster baronets of Bamburgh

Sir Claudius Forster, 1st Baronet (c. 1575 – c. 1623), or Claude, was knighted by James I and created a baronet in the Baronetage of England on 7 March 1620.

== Life ==
He was the son of Nicholas Forster, High Sheriff of Northumberland in 1601, and his wife Jane Radclyffe or Radcliffe of Blanchland, daughter of Cuthbert Radcliffe; his father was the illegitimate son of Sir John Forster and Jane Buicks. He was granted ownership of Bamburgh Castle and its manor by the King in 1610; and inherited the Blanchland Abbey estate from his mother. Forster followed his father as High Sheriff of Northumberland in 1612.

Forster's memorial with Latin inscription is in St Aidan's Church, Bamburgh.

== Family ==
Forster married Elizabeth Fenwick, half-sister of Sir John Fenwick, 1st Baronet; the couple had no children. Elizabeth was the daughter of Sir William Fenwick of Wallington, by his second wife Margaret Selby. His first wife was Grace Forster, daughter of Sir John Forster.

His estates passed to his brother John Forster, who married within the Forster family, to Susan Forster, daughter of Thomas Forster of Ederston (Adderstone).

== See also ==
- James Raine, History and Antiquities of North Durham (1852), p. 306.

Baronetage of England
New creation	Baronet (of Bamburgh); 1620–1623	Extinct
