= Matfen Hall =

Hotel in Matfen, Northumberland, England

Matfen Hall Hotel and Country Club
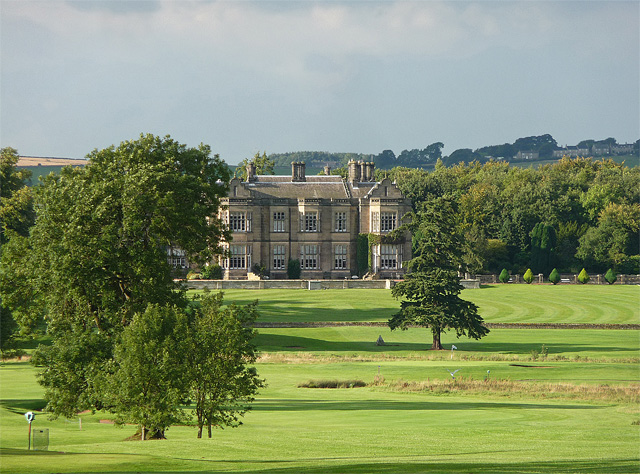

- Location within Northumberland

General information
- Location: Matfen, Northumberland, England
- Coordinates: 55°2′20″N 1°56′52″W

Matfen Hall is a 19th-century country mansion in Matfen, Northumberland, England, the seat of the Blackett baronets and now also a hotel and country golf club. It is a Grade II* listed building.

The manor of West Matfen was owned in the 13th century by Philip de Ulcote and passed through his sisters to Felton, by marriage to Hastings and later to Lawson. In 1625 the estate was bought by Lancelot Fenwick of a branch of the old-established local family. The manor and manor house, West Matfen High Hall, was sold in 1680 to John Douglas, Town Clerk of Newcastle. His granddaughter and Douglas heiress married Sir Edward Blackett, Bt., in 1757, thereby bringing the estate into the Blackett family.

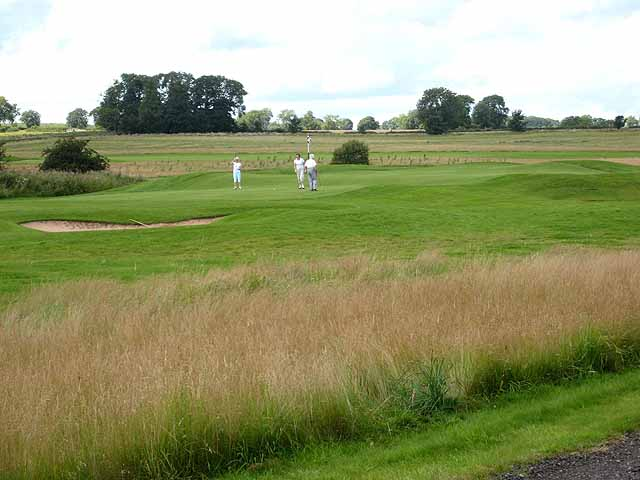
Golf course

The present house was built to replace the old manor, in 1832 for Sir William Blackett, 6th Baronet. The impressive Jacobean-style mansion has a three-storey seven-bay entrance front. An important internal feature is a full-height Gothic hall.

Between 1965 and 1994 the house was leased out, operating as the Northumberland Cheshire Home.

Sir Hugh Blackett, the 12th Baronet, and Lady Blackett have since converted the hall into a hotel and country club, which opened in 1999. The Blacketts now live at Halton Castle, a few miles west of Matfen.
