= Sir William Blackett, 2nd Baronet =

British politician

Sir William Blackett, 2nd Baronet of Newcastle-upon-Tyne (11 February 1690 – 25 September 1728), of Pilgrim Street, Newcastle-upon-Tyne and Wallington Hall, Northumberland, was a British landowner and Tory politician who sat in the House of Commons from 1710 to 1728.

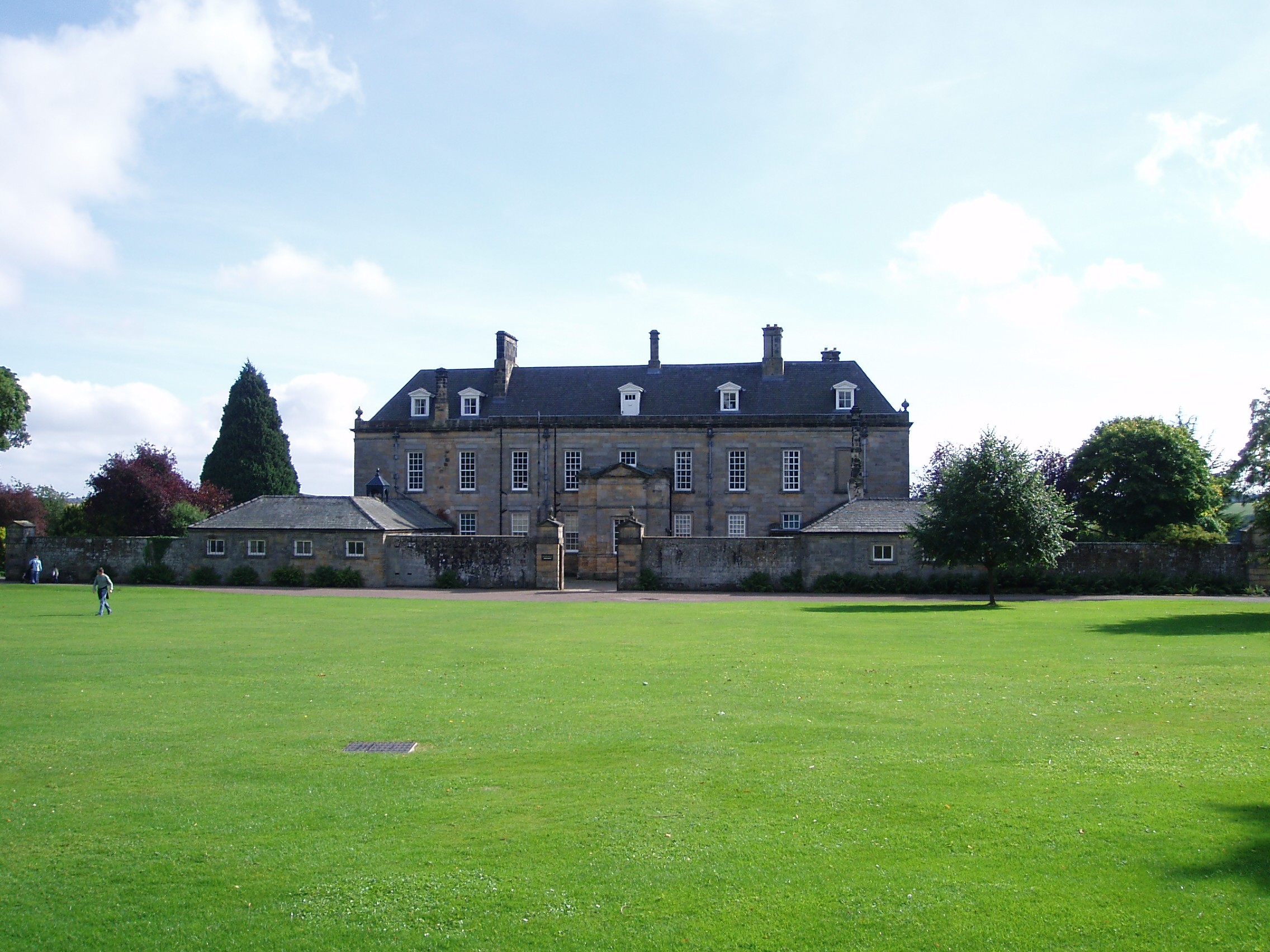
Wallington Hall, Cambo

Blackett was the son of William Blackett and his wife Julia Conyers. He was educated at University College, Oxford. On the death of his father in 1705, he succeeded to the baronetcy and to Wallington Hall, Cambo.

Blackett was elected Member of Parliament for Newcastle-upon-Tyne in 1710, and retained the seat until 1728. He was elected Mayor of Newcastle for 1718–19.

Blackett was a Jacobite but toned down his support after a warrant was issued for his arrest.

He married Barbara Villiers, daughter of the Earl of Jersey, in 1725. They had no children, although he had previously had an illegitimate daughter, Elizabeth Orde; the baronetcy became extinct upon his death. He bequeathed his estates at Allendale, Northumberland and Wallington Hall, Cambo to his nephew Sir Walter Calverley, 2nd Baronet of Calverley, conditional upon the latter's marriage to Elizabeth Orde, Blackett's natural daughter and his change of name to Blackett; he implemented the change of name by a private act of Parliament, Calverley's Name Act 1733 (7 Geo. 2. c. 4 Pr.).

Parliament of Great Britain
Preceded by William Carr (1); Sir Henry Liddell, Bt	Member of Parliament for Newcastle-upon-Tyne; 1710–1728; With: William Wrightson 1710–1722; William Carr (2) 1722–1727; Nicholas Fenwick 1727–1728	Succeeded by Nicholas Fenwick; William Carr (2)
Baronetage of England
Preceded by William Blackett	Baronet (of Newcastle); 1705–1728	Extinct
