= Thomas Forster (Northumberland MP, born 1659) =

English politician (1659–1725)

Thomas Forster (6 August 1659 – 1725) was an English Tory politician.

== Biography ==
He was the first son of Colonel Thomas Forster (died 1673) and Mary, the daughter of Sir Nicholas Cole, 1st Baronet. He was educated at Durham school and matriculated at St John's College, Cambridge in 1677. On 27 January 1681, he married Frances, the daughter of Sir William Forster and heiress of Ferdinando Forster. They had three sons (one predeceased him) and three daughters. He married his second wife, Mary (died 1697) and had one sons and one daughter. He married his third wife, Barbara Lawes. His eldest son was the Jacobite commander, Thomas Forster.

He sat as a Member of Parliament for Northumberland from 1705 until 1708. He was a relatively inactive member, but in the 1706–7 session he guided through a private bill concerned with estates in Northumberland. He was classed as a Tory in an analysis of the house from early 1708. He served as High Sheriff of Northumberland in 1703.
