= Bill Foster (basketball) =

Two former collegiate basketball coaches were named Bill Foster, who may refer to:

- Bill Foster (basketball, born 1929) (1929–2016), former coach of Rutgers, Utah, Duke, South Carolina and Northwestern
- Bill Foster (basketball, born 1936) (1936–2015), former coach of Charlotte, Clemson and Virginia Tech
- Bill Foster (disambiguation)
