= Philip Howard (1669–1711) =

British politician

Philip Howard was a English politician who owed his brief career in Parliament to his kinship with the Earl of Carlisle.

The son of Sir Philip Howard and his wife Elizabeth, daughter of Sir Robert Newton, 1st Baronet, he received no legacy from his debt-ridden father. Through the influence of his cousin, Charles Howard, 3rd Earl of Carlisle, he was returned as Member of Parliament for Morpeth in 1698 and Carlisle in 1701. He won the contested election at Carlisle despite being abroad in France, attempting to persuade the Earl's brother William to return to England.

Harley considered Howard, during his brief time in the House of Commons, a Whig; but he was defeated at the contested election of 1702, despite his cousin's continued support. Howard was commissioned a lieutenant-colonel in the newly raised Edward Fox's Regiment of Marines and traveled with them to Europe, but he resigned his commission by the end of the year.

Howard's later life is obscure, and seems to have been financially troubled. His exact date of death is not known, but his executors were granted probate on 14 May 1711.

Parliament of England
Preceded by George Nicholas; Sir Henry Belasyse	Member of Parliament for Morpeth; 1698–1700; With: Sir Henry Belasyse	Succeeded by Sir Henry Belasyse; Sir Richard Sandford
Preceded by James Lowther; William Howard	Member of Parliament for Carlisle; 1701–1702; With: James Lowther	Succeeded by Christopher Musgrave; Thomas Stanwix
