= Blackett =

Blackett or Blacket is a surname of English derivation.

== People ==
- Andrea Blackett (born 1976), Barbadian athlete
- Basil Phillott Blackett (1882–1935), British civil servant and finance expert
- Basil Blackett (1886–1920), British WW1 flying ace
- Christopher Blackett (c.1751–1829), British colliery and newspaper owner and railway innovator
- Edmund Blacket (1817–1883), Australian architect
- Hill Blackett (1892–1967), American radio advertising pioneer
- Blackett baronets
  - Sir William Blackett, 1st Baronet, of Matfen (1620–1680), businessman and MP
  - Sir Edward Blackett, 2nd Baronet of Matfen (1649–1718), MP, builder of Newby Hall
  - Sir Edward Blackett, 3rd Baronet (1683–1756), Royal Navy officer
  - Sir Edward Blackett, 4th Baronet of Matfen (1719–1804), MP
  - Sir William Blackett, 1st Baronet, of Newcastle (1657–1705), MP
  - Sir William Blackett, 2nd Baronet of Newcastle (1690–1728), MP
- Calverley-Blackett baronets
  - Sir Walter Blackett, 2nd Baronet (born Calverley), MP
- Jamie Blackett (born 1964), British politician, landowner, author and freelance columnist
- Jeff Blackett (born 1955), British Royal Navy office and judge
- John Fenwick Burgoyne Blackett (1821–1856), British politician
- John Erasmus Blackett (1729–1814), British businessman and Mayor of Newcastle
- John Blackett (1818–1893), New Zealand engineer
- Joseph Blacket (d. 1810), poet
- Lee Blackett (born 1982), English rugby player and coach
- Lindsay Blackett (born 1961), Canadian politician
- Mary Dawes Blackett (fl. 1786–1791), British writer
- Patrick Blackett, Baron Blackett (1897–1974), British experimental physicist, Nobel Prize winner
- Ralph Beattie Blacket (1919–2010), Australian physician
- Shane Blackett (born 1982), English footballer
- Tyler Blackett (born 1994), English footballer
- Vivien Blackett (born 1955), English artist
- Blackett of Wylam, a family

== Fictional characters ==
- Nancy Blackett and Peggy Blackett, Swallows and Amazons
- Sergeant Blackitt, Z-Cars
