= Halton Castle, Northumberland =

Grade I listed peel tower in Northumberland, England, UK

Halton Castle
- Northumberland, England, UK
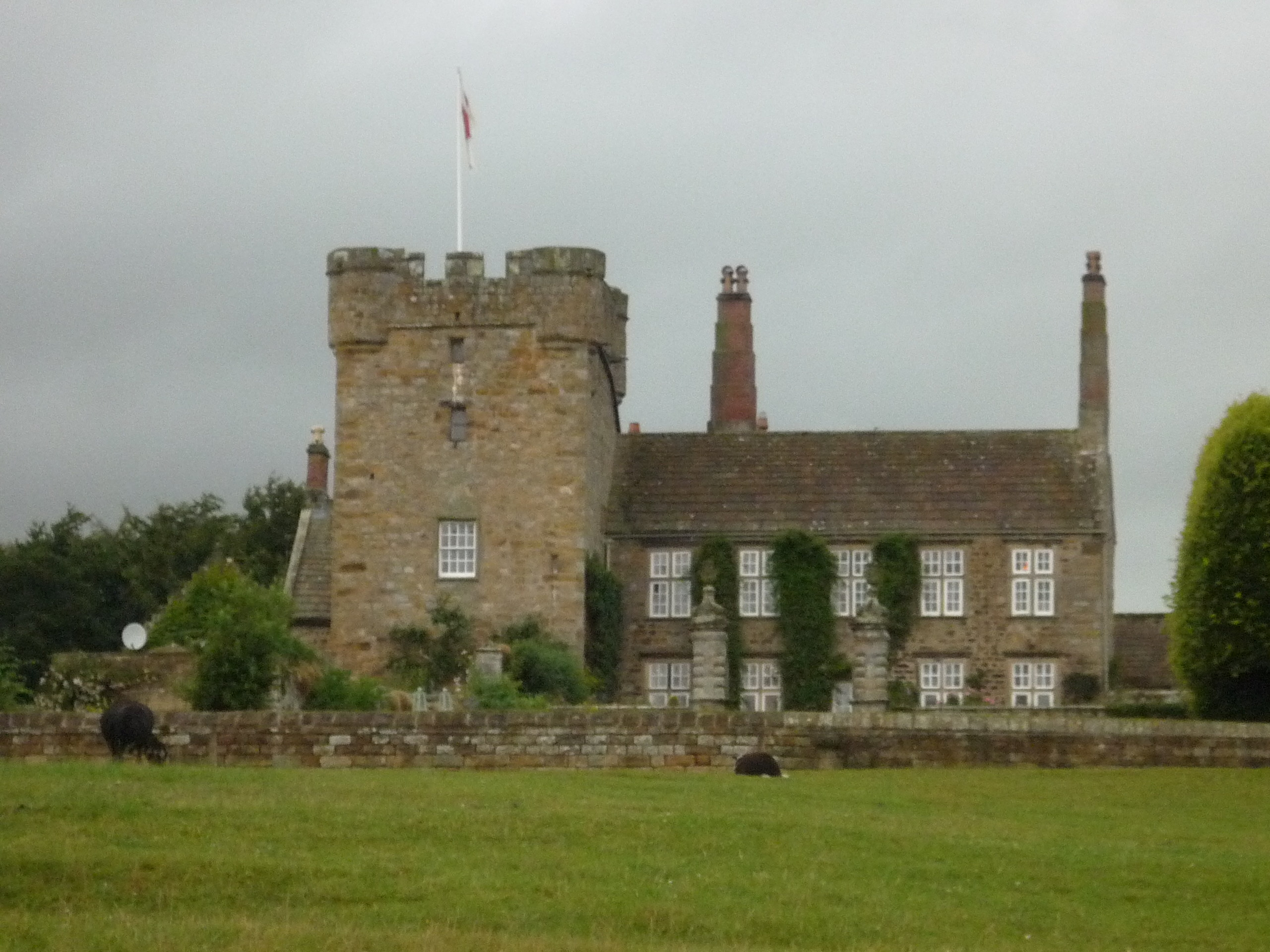

Location
- Location in Northumberland
- Coordinates: 55.005°N 2.006°W
- Grid reference: NY997678

Halton Castle is a pele tower and grade I listed building situated close to Hadrian's Wall to the north of the village of Corbridge in Northumberland, England.

The tower was first recorded in 1382 and it is still present today. It has four storeys and a basement with a stone vault. In the 15th century a manor house was built onto the north side of the tower giving it a T-shaped plan. In about 1696 much of this building was demolished by the then owner John Douglas and replaced with the present five-bay residence.

In 1757 Anne Douglas the heiress of Halton married Sir Edward Blackett and the castle remains a residence of the Blackett family.
