= Monument to Grace Darling =

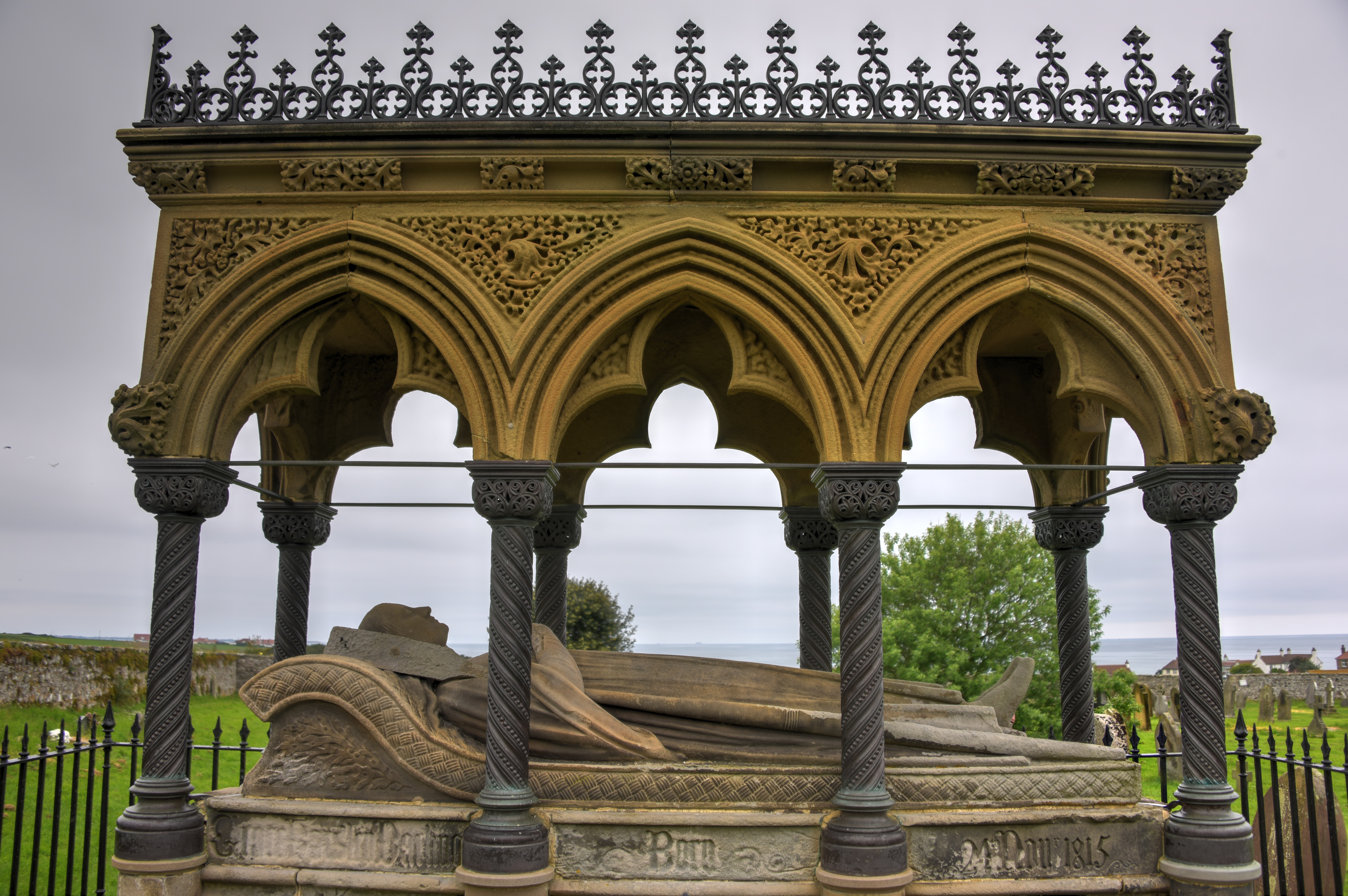

- Location within Northumberland
- 55.60796°N 1.71911°W
- Type: Funerary monument
- Location: Bamburgh, Northumberland

History
- Built: 1842

Site notes
- Architect: Anthony Salvin
- Architectural style: Victorian
- Governing body: Church

Listed Building – Grade II*
- Official name: Monument to Grace Darling circa 30 yards West of the Church of St Aidan
- Designated: 22 December 1969
- Reference no.: 1206625

The Monument to Grace Darling, in the churchyard of St Aidan's Church, Bamburgh, Northumberland is a Victorian Gothic memorial. The monument was designed by Anthony Salvin, with later renovations by Frederick Wilson, C. R. Smith and W. S. Hicks. Grace Darling was born on 24 November 1815, the daughter of the lighthouseman at Longstone Lighthouse. In 1838, Darling became a national heroine when she and her father rescued nine people from the wreck of the SS Forfarshire, a ship that had run aground off Big Harcar, an island off the Northumbrian coast. Darling died of tuberculosis aged 26 in 1842, and the monument was raised some distance to the north of her grave to make it visible to passing sailors, at the west edge of the churchyard in the same year. It is a Grade II* listed structure.

== History and description ==
Grace Darling's rescue, with her father, of nine survivors from the SS Forfarshire made her a national heroine. Darling received the Gold Medal for Bravery from the Royal Humane Society, the Silver Medal for Gallantry from the precursor of the Royal National Lifeboat Institution, and a tribute fund included a contribution of £50 from Queen Victoria. Her death from tuberculosis four years later was an occasion of national mourning. Buried in the churchyard of St Aidan's, she was additionally commemorated by a large funerary monument to the north of her grave, designed by Anthony Salvin. Salvin's choice of Portland stone for the memorial was unfortunate, it weathered badly and by 1885 complete reconstruction was required. The original effigy of Darling was moved into the church and a replacement, carved from stone donated by William Armstrong, 1st Baron Armstrong of Bamburgh Castle, was designed by C. R. Smith. Further damage was caused by a storm in 1895, and the canopy was replaced to a design by W. S. Hicks. In 2013, the 175th anniversary of the rescue was commemorated with a service.

Sir Nickolaus Pevsner and Ian Richmond, in the Northumbrian edition of the Buildings of England describe the monument as a "Gothic shrine". The style is Decorated Gothic. The recumbent effigy of Darling lies under a three-arched canopy with "metal colonettes" and topped by finials. The monument was given a Grade II* listing designation in 1969.

== Sources ==
- Pevsner, Nikolaus; Richmond, Ian (2002). Northumberland. The Buildings Of England. New Haven, US and London: Yale University Press. ISBN 978-0-300-09638-5.
