= William Foster =

William Foster may refer to:

== People ==
=== Arts ===
- Will Foster (fl. 1990–), keyboardist for English rock band The Tears
- William Foster (British architect) (1876–1940), British architect
- William Foster (Iowa architect) (1842–1909), architect in Iowa, United States
- William C. Foster (1880–1923), pioneer of cinematography
- William D. Foster (1884–?), African-American film producer
- William Dewey Foster (1890–1958), American architect, designer of post offices and government buildings
- William Gilbert Foster (1855–1906), British painter

=== Military ===
- William Foster (British Army officer) (1881–1942), British Home Guard officer, awarded the George Cross, 1942
- William Foster (Medal of Honor) (1832–1880), American soldier and Medal of Honor recipient
- William A. Foster (1917–1945), United States Marine, Medal of Honor recipient, killed in action during World War II
- William Foster MacNeece Foster (1889–1978), Royal Air Force officer

=== Politics ===
- William Foster (New South Wales politician, born 1865) (1865–1936), member of NSW Legislative Assembly (1925–1936)
- William Foster (New South Wales politician, born 1794) (1793/4–1866), member of the NSW Legislative Council (1843–1845)
- William John Foster (1831–1909), member of the NSW Legislative Council & Legislative Council, Attorney-General and Supreme Court judge
- William Foster (New Hampshire politician), New Hampshire politician
- William Foster (New York state senator) (1813–1893), New York politician
- William Foster (British politician) (1887–1947), British Labour Party MP for Wigan, 1942–1947
- William Henry Foster (Lancaster MP) (1848–1908), MP for Lancaster 1895–1900
- William Henry Foster (Bridgnorth MP) (1846–1924), British member of parliament (MP) for Bridgnorth 1870–1885
- William Orme Foster (1814–1899), British Whig MP for South Staffordshire, 1857–1868
- William W. Foster (1922–2000), Pennsylvania politician
- William Z. Foster (1881–1961), chairman of the Communist Party USA

=== Religion ===
- William Foster (bishop) (1744–1797), Irish bishop
- William Foster (divine) (1591–16??), English divine

=== Sport ===
- William Foster (English cricketer) (1859–1944), English cricketer
- William Foster (Scottish cricketer) (born 1934), Scottish cricketer
- William Foster (swimmer) (1890–1963), British Olympic freestyle swimmer
- William Foster (footballer), English footballer
- Bill Foster (baseball) (William Hendrick Foster, 1904–1978), Negro leagues baseball player
- Bill Foster (basketball, born 1929) (William Edwin Foster, 1929–2016), college basketball head coach at Rutgers, Utah, Duke, South Carolina, and Northwestern
- Bill Foster (basketball, born 1936) (William Carey Foster, 1936–2015), college basketball head coach at Charlotte, Miami, Clemson, and Virginia Tech
- Billy Foster (William Alva Foster, 1937–1967), Canadian racecar driver
- Will Foster (American football) (William Henry Foster, born 1948), American football player

=== Other ===
- William Foster (historiographer) (1863–1951), British historiographer and Superintendent of Records at the India office
- William Chapman Foster (1897–1984), American businessman and government official
- William H. Foster (1847–1886), British-born American labor union leader
- William P. Foster (1919–2010), creator of the Florida A&M University Marching 100 marching band
- William P. Foster (swindler) (fl. 1810s), American swindler who obtained an appointment to the Illinois Supreme Court, but never served
- William Trufant Foster (1879–1950), American educator and economist, first president of Reed College
- William Wasbrough Foster (1875–1954), Canadian mountaineer, politician, business man, and chief constable
- William Alexander Foster (1840–1888), Canadian barrister and essayist
- William Barclay Foster (1779–1855), father of Stephen Foster and businessman
- William E. Foster (1851–1930), American librarian and author
- William Foster, captain of the Clotilda and last person to have imported slaves from Africa to the United States
- Bill Foster (character) (William Foster), Marvel Comics superhero

== Organizations ==
- William Foster & Co., an agricultural machinery company, which built the first tanks (armored vehicles)
- William Foster Elementary School in Garfield Heights, Ohio named for William A. Foster, US. Marine

== Fiction ==
- William Foster, a character portrayed by Michael Douglas in the 1993 movie Falling Down
- William Foster, a character portrayed by Keanu Reeves in the 2018 movie Replicas

== See also ==
- Bill Foster (disambiguation)
- William Forster (disambiguation)
- Wilbur F. Foster (1841–1900), American politician, lawyer
