= Sir Edward Blackett, 4th Baronet =

English baronet (1719–1804)

Sir Edward Blackett, 4th Baronet (9 April 1719 – 3 February 1804) was a baronet and member of the British House of Commons for Northumberland.

Blackett was the son of John Blackett of Newby Park (the second son of Sir Edward Blackett, 2nd Baronet) and his wife Patience Wise. He sold Newby Hall, Ripon, Yorkshire, the family seat since 1690, to William Welland in 1748. In 1756 he succeeded to the Baronetcy on the death of his uncle Sir Edward Blackett, 3rd Baronet.

He was High Sheriff of Northumberland 1757–1758 and in 1768 became MP for Northumberland until 1774.

In 1757 he married Anne Douglas, daughter of Oley Douglas and heiress of Matfen, Northumberland and was succeeded by their son William.

Parliament of Great Britain
Preceded by Sir Henry Grey, Bt; George Delaval	Member of Parliament for Northumberland; 1768–1774; With: George Delaval	Succeeded by Lord Algernon Percy; Sir William Middleton
Baronetage of England
Preceded by Edward Blackett	Baronet (of Matfen Hall); 1756–1804	Succeeded by William Blackett
