= The Lord Crewe Arms Hotel =

Hotel in England

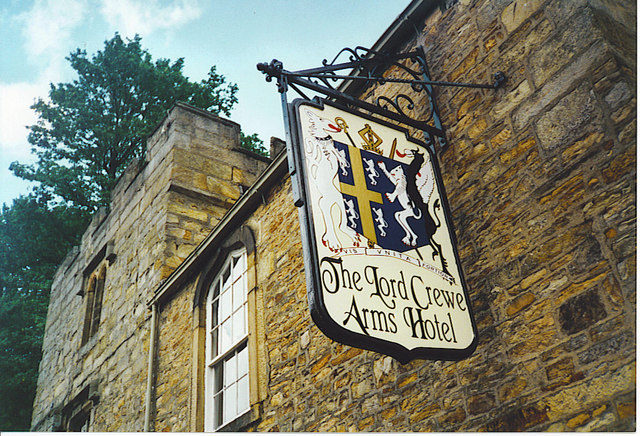

- Northumberland

General information
- Location: Blanchland, Northumberland, England
- Coordinates: 54°50′52″N 2°3′18″W

The Lord Crewe Arms Hotel is a medieval hotel in Blanchland, Northumberland, England. It is dated to 1165 and was used as a hiding hole by monks of nearby Blanchland Abbey for centuries and contains hidden stairways and stone flagged floors. The hotel is built upon the former abbey guest house.

It is named after Lord Crewe the Bishop of Durham. The Lord Crewe Arms Hotel has a fireplace where 'General' Tom Forster hid during the 1715 Jacobite rising. The hotel is reputedly haunted by the ghost of his sister, Dorothy Foster.

W. H. Auden stayed at the Lord Crewe Arms with Gabriel Carritt at Easter 1930 and later remarked that no place held sweeter memories. Blanchland may have been the model for the village in which was set the opening and closing scenes of Auden and Isherwood's play The Dog Beneath the Skin (1935).

The poet Philip Larkin used to dine at the hotel when staying with Monica Jones in Haydon Bridge. In October 1961, and again in July 1969, Benjamin Britten and Sir Peter Pears stayed at the Inn.
