= Thomas Forster =

British politician and Jacobite leader (1683–1738)

- Born: 1683; Adderstone Hall, Northumberland, England
- Died: 27 October 1738 (aged 54–55); Boulogne-sur-Mer, France
- Occupation: Member of Parliament
- Known for: Leadership of Jacobite forces in northern England during the Jacobite rising of 1715
- Political party: Tories

Thomas Forster (1683 – 27 October 1738), of Adderstone Hall, Northumberland, was an English landowner and Tory politician who sat in the House of Commons from 1708 to 1716. He served as a general of the Jacobite army in the 1715 Uprising and subsequently fled into exile in France.

== Early life ==
Forster was baptized on 29 March 1683, the eldest son of Thomas Forster (1659–1725) of Adderstone, MP for Northumberland from 1705 to 1708. His mother was Frances Forster, daughter of Sir William Forster of Bamburgh Castle. He was educated at Newcastle School, and was admitted at St John's College, Cambridge on 3 July 1700. In 1701, he inherited, with his aunt Dorothy Crew (wife of Lord Crew, Bishop of Durham) the estates of his uncle, Ferdinando Forster, of Bamburgh and Blanchland. The estates had incurred substantial debts, and in 1704 the creditors instituted actions in the Court of Chancery to force the heirs to sell them.

== Political career ==
Forster was returned as a Tory Member of Parliament (MP) for Northumberland at the 1708 British general election. In 1709 he and his aunt sold the indebted estates to his aunt's husband, Bishop Crewe, and were left with very little of the proceeds. In 1710 he voted against the impeachment of Dr Sacheverell. At the 1710 British general election he was returned again for Northumberland in a contest and tried unsuccessfully to return Tory candidates at Berwick-upon-Tweed and Morpeth. He was listed as one of the ‘Tory patriots’ who had opposed the continuation of the War of the Spanish Succession, and one of the ‘worthy patriots’ who had helped to detect the mismanagements of the previous ministry. He supported the efforts of the Earl of Hertford and James Lowther, both Whigs, in carrying forward a bill to regulate trade on the border with Scotland. On 18 June 1713, he voted in favour of the French commerce bill. He was returned again at the 1713 British general election but was inactive in Parliament. He was returned as MP for Northumberland at the 1715 British general election but his activities were diverted into supporting the Jacobite cause.

== Jacobite rebellion and exile ==
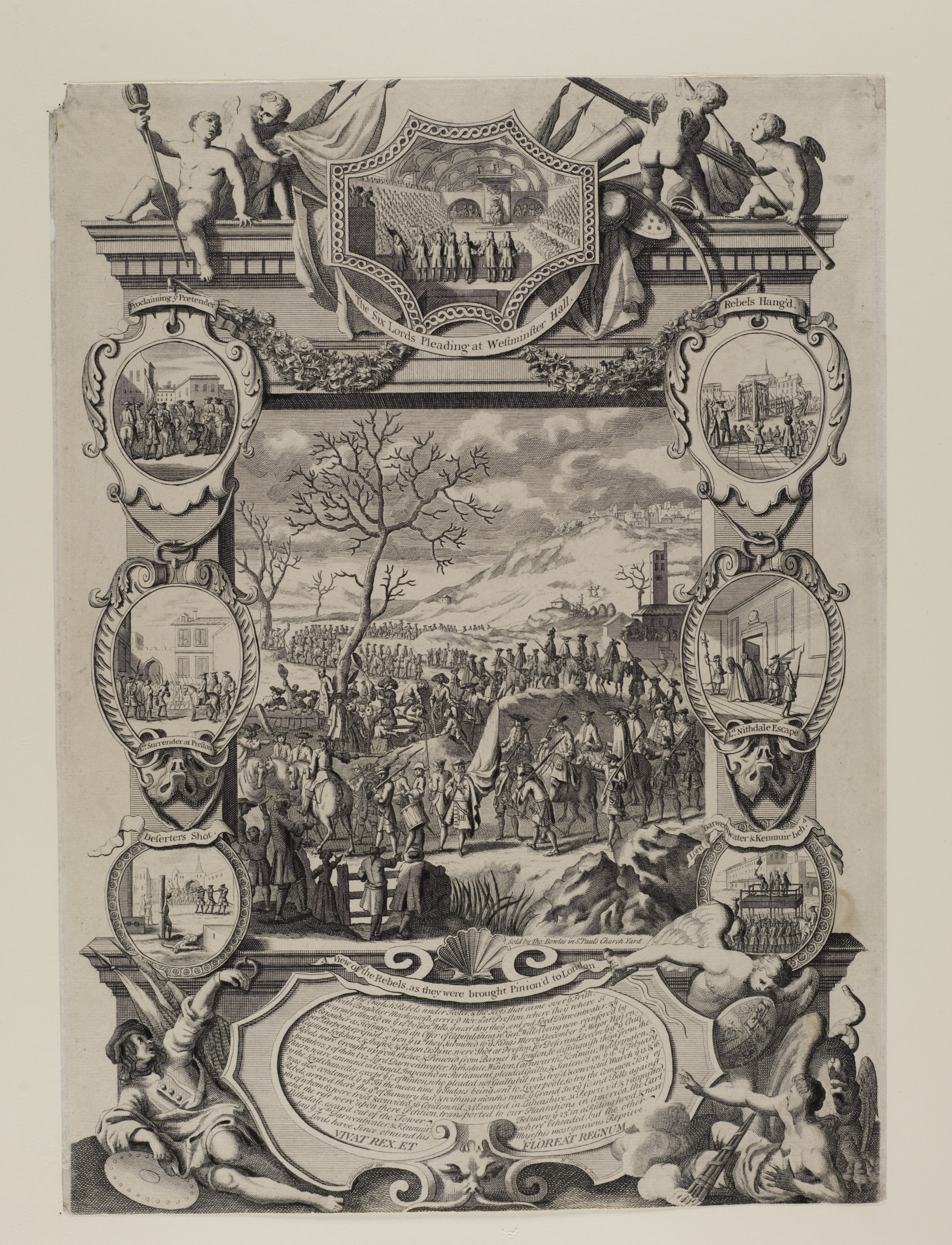
An illustration of key events of the 1715 Uprising in England from the Jacobite Broadside. The Jacobite defeat at Preston (second down on left) resulted in Forster's attainder and exile.

The Forsters were cousins to the Radcliffes. The head of the family, Lord Derwentwater, himself a cousin of the Old Pretender, was a leader of the 1715 Jacobite Rebellion. Forster met up with Lord Derwentwater in Northumberland at the head of 300 horse, and proclaimed the Pretender at Warkworth on 9 October. Forster had evaded arrest in London on 21 September 1715 on a charge of being ‘engaged in a design to support the intended invasion of the kingdom’. After an unsuccessful attempt to take Newcastle, he joined another body of rebels north of the border and a detachment from Mar's army.

Although having no military experience, Forster, as a Protestant, was elected to lead all Jacobite forces in England. Under his direction Lancelot Errington captured the island of Lindisfarne. Forster relied on advice from Henry Oxburgh, an Irish former soldier. Forster initially intended to wait for French support, but when this did not materialise, he broke camp; Forster proclaimed "James III" in Alnwick on 13 October and at Hexham on 15 October. On 31 October, news arrived that Jacobites in Manchester were ready to rise in support of the rebellion. Forster's Jacobite army moved southwest from Northumberland into Lancashire, but were faced with converging forces of the British Army under Charles Wills and George Carpenter.

Forster and the main Jacobite force arrived in Preston on 10 November. The following day, Forster withdrew his forces from a strong defensive position at Ribble bridge, half a mile outside Preston. On 14 November 1715, Forster surrendered after his forces were surrounded during the Battle of Preston. He briefly evaded capture, including by hiding in a fireplace in the The Lord Crewe Arms Hotel, but was soon found by government forces. He was imprisoned in Newgate Prison, but escaped on 10 April 1716 having acquired a key to his cell, just four days before his scheduled trial for high treason. He then fled to France; a £1,000 reward was issued by the government for his capture. The details of his escape and the text of the royal proclamation ordering his arrest were published by the contemporary commentator Boyer (1716). He was attainted and expelled from Parliament on 2 February 1716. Several of his former comrades including Derwentwater and Oxburgh were executed.

Forster managed to reach Paris, where he was sent money by William Dicconson, the Pretender's treasurer. He then joined the English Jacobites at the Stuart court, where he was made steward of the Household. He had been excepted from the Act of Indemnity, and his brother John succeeded to Adderstone in 1725. His nephew Thomas remarked, in correspondence, that he held out ‘little hopes’ of his ‘getting anything from the succession’. After the Pretender moved to Avignon from Rome he summoned Forster there in October 1727.

== Death and legacy ==
Forster died unmarried in Boulogne-sur-Mer, France on 27 October 1738, aged 55. His body, after being initially buried at Boulogne, was returned to England and reburied at Bamburgh on 7 December.

== Physical description ==
Forster was described as follows in the 1716 royal proclamation ordering his arrest: A person of middle stature, inclining to be fat, well shaped except that he has stoops in the shoulders, fair complexioned, his mouth wide, his nose pretty large, his eyes grey, speaks the northern dialect".

Parliament of Great Britain
Preceded by Sir John Delaval; Thomas Forster	Member of Parliament for Northumberland; 1708–1716; With: The Earl of Hertford	Succeeded by Francis Blake Delaval; The Earl of Hertford
