= William Howard (died 1701) =

English Member of Parliament

The Honourable William Howard (c. 1674 – 18 July 1701) was an English Whig Member of Parliament.

Howard was a younger son of the 2nd Earl of Carlisle, and brother of the 3rd Earl of Carlisle (who became First Lord of the Treasury in 1701). He entered Parliament in 1695 as member for Carlisle. At the general election in January 1701 he was elected for both Northumberland and Morpeth, choosing to sit for the former, but died later the same year.

Parliament of England
Preceded by James Lowther; Christopher Musgrave	Member of Parliament for Carlisle; 1695–1701; With: James Lowther	Succeeded by James Lowther; Philip Howard
Preceded by William Forster; Sir Edward Blackett	Member of Parliament for Northumberland; 1701; With: Ferdinando Forster	Succeeded by Sir Francis Blake; William Loraine
