= John Forster (soldier) =

English military commander (1520-1602)

Sir John Forster (c. 1520 – 1602) was an English military commander and Warden of the Middle Marches.

== Life ==
Born about 1520, he was son of Sir Thomas Forster (d. 1527) of Etherston, Northumberland, marshal of Berwick, and his wife Dorothy, daughter of Ralph Ogle, 3rd Baron Ogle and Margaret Gascoigne. Trained from early youth in border warfare, he was in August 1542 put in command of Harbottle Castle with a garrison of a hundred men. He fought at the Battle of Solway Moss, 23 November 1542, under Thomas Wharton, 1st Baron Wharton, and claimed to have captured Robert Maxwell, 5th Baron Maxwell; Cuthbert Tunstall and Suffolk, however, determined that Maxwell's real captor was Edward Aglionby.

He fought also at the Battle of Pinkie Cleugh, 1547. Knighted by Protector Somerset in 1547, he was sheriff of Northumberland, 1549–50.

On 4 August 1563 he was appointed a commissioner to treat concerning the delimitation of the borders, and on 10 January 1565 to discuss the position of James Stewart, 1st Earl of Moray and other Scottish exiles in England. After the murder of David Rizzio, Mary, Queen of Scots wrote to Elizabeth I asking that the Earls of Ruthven and Morton and their accomplices should be returned to Scotland from Newcastle. Elizabeth asked Forster to tell them to find refuge outside England.

Forster met Mary, Queen of Scots, near to Berwick in November 1566, and showed her the view from Halidon Hill. Unfortunately, his horse kicked her.

In 1569 he assisted in suppressing the Rebellion of the Northern Earls, and in 1570 took punitive measures against the Scottish borderers who had helped them. In August 1572 he was ordered to have the Earl of Northumberland executed.

Forster came to Holyrood Palace in August 1573 as an ambassador to discuss border affairs. His role included regular meetings with the Scottish Wardens on days of truce. His meeting with Sir John Carmichael on 7 July 1575 turned into a battle, and he was defeated and captured. His lieutenant, Sir George Heron, among others, was killed. Forster and his companions, after a few days at Dalkeith Palace, were released by Regent Morton, on Elizabeth's remonstrances.

In May 1582, some men at the English border captured a messenger disguised as a dentist. They let him go, but Forster obtained from them a mirror containing letters in a secret compartment. Forster forwarded the letters to Francis Walsingham. they included information about a conspiracy involving Mary, Queen of Scots.

On 27 July 1585, Forster and his son-in-law, Francis, Lord Russell were attacked by Thomas Kerr of Ferniehirst, and Russell was killed. Forster at first described it as an accident, but this did not suit the English government, and, with a view to exacting compensation, Russell's death was represented as the result of a deliberate plot. Meanwhile, various accusations, promoted perhaps by local feuds, were brought against Forster; he was said to have connived at murder, set thieves at liberty, executed others on insufficient grounds, and had dealings with Northumberland wreckers. Articles based on these accusations were drawn up on 27 September 1586, and Forster was dismissed from his office, Lord Eure being appointed in his place. Lord Hunsdon, however, thought the charges frivolous, and about April 1588 Forster was restored as warden.

In June 1594 he made a proclamation that no one in the wardenry should receive the Scottish rebel Francis Stewart, 5th Earl of Bothwell. He asked the Mayor of Newcastle, Lionel Maddison to keep sure custody of Jacob Kroger and Guillaume Martin, who had stolen jewels from the Scottish queen Anne of Denmark. Forster held the wardenry until October 1595, when he was again superseded by Lord Eure; his removal was due partly to his old age, partly to a renewal of the charges against him.

On 24 October 1597 he was nearly surprised at Bamburgh Castle by a party of Scots. He died at Bamburgh on 13 January 1602.

== Family ==
He had only daughters (not confirmed) with his wife Jane, daughter of Cuthbert Radcliffe (Walsinghams' spy in the Percy House), and widow of Robert Ogle, 5th Baron Ogle. Their daughter Eleanor, or Juliana, wife of Francis, Lord Russell, was the mother of Edward Russell, 3rd Earl of Bedford; and another daughter, Grace, married Sir William Fenwick of Wallington, and was mother of Sir John Fenwick, 1st Baronet.

His son Nicholas, deputy-warden under John himself, was knighted in 1603. He was the father of Sir Claudius Forster, 1st Baronet, who died without issue; and John, who did not inherit the title but succeeded to his brother's estate. Nicholas's mother was Janet Buicks.
