= Sir John Bright, 1st Baronet =

English parliamentarian

Sir John Bright, 1st Baronet (14 October 1619 – 13 October 1688) was an English parliamentarian, of Carbrook and Badsworth, Yorkshire.

== Birth and family ==
John Bright was born in 1619, the third, but only surviving, son of Stephen Bright and Joan Westby.

== Military career ==
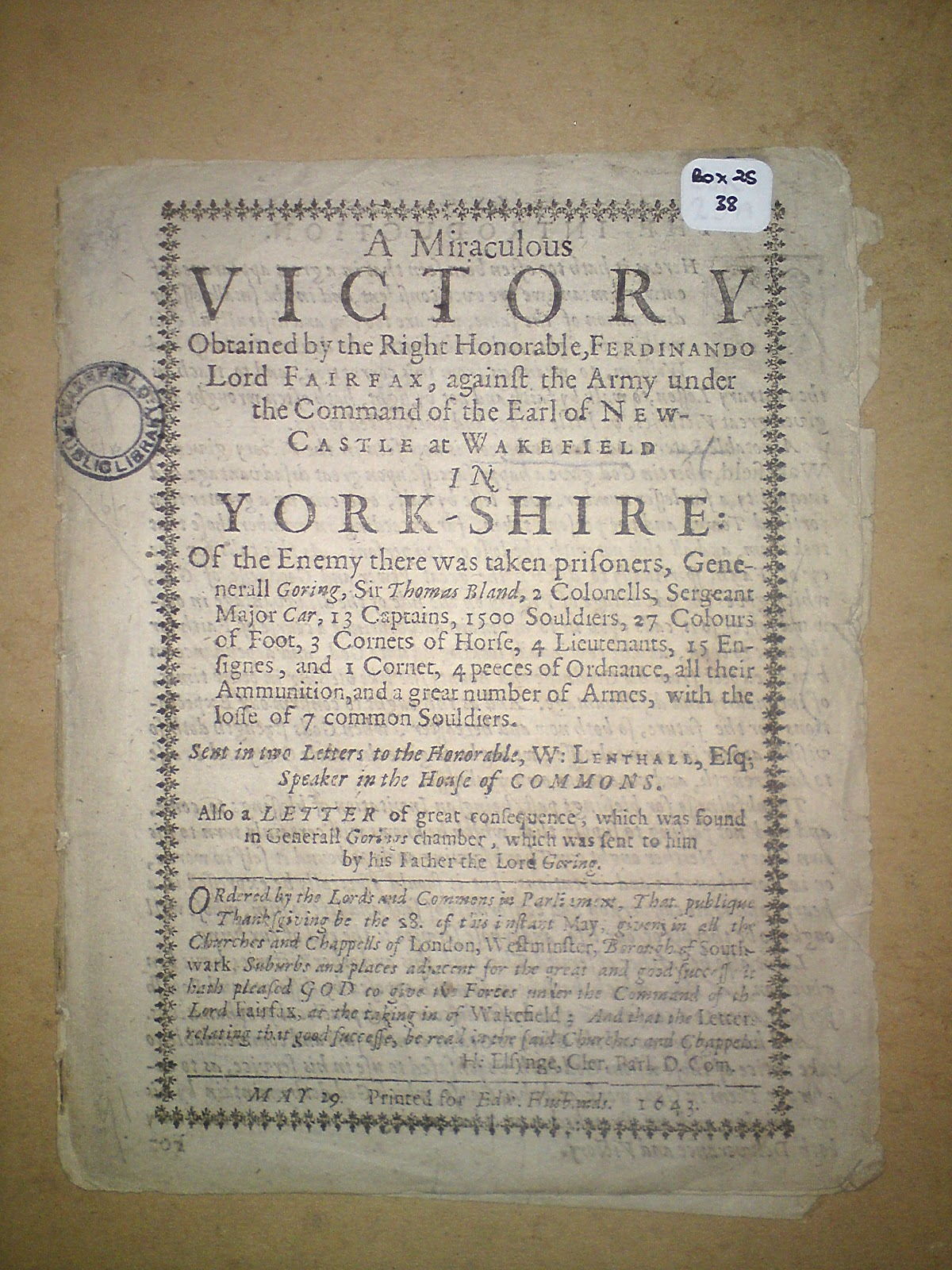
Pamphlet held by Wakefield Libraries Local Studies collection

Bright took up arms for the parliament at the outbreak of the civil war. He raised several companies in the neighbourhood of Sheffield, and received a captain's commission from Lord Fairfax, still aged only twenty-one. Bright was named one of the sequestration commissioners for the West Riding (1 April 1643). About the same date he became a colonel of foot. According to the diarist, memorialist, and fellow officer, John Hodgson : 'He was but young when he first had the command, but he grew very valiant and prudent, and had his officers and soldiers under good conduct'. In May 1643, Bright was involved in a daring night time raid on Wakefield. Details were published in the pamphlet 'A Miraculous Victory' held in Wakefield Libraries Local Studies collection.

He accompanied Sir Thomas Fairfax in his expedition into Cheshire and commanded a brigade at the battle of Selby. He ordered the delivery of new cannon from Doncaster forcing the surrender of Sheffield castle. Briefly, he was appointed governor of that place (August 1644), and a little later promoted as military governor of York. He probably served in the line during the Battle of Marston Moor.

In the second civil war he served under Cromwell in Scotland, and also took part in the siege of Pontefract. On Cromwell's second expedition into Scotland, Bright threw up his commission when the army arrived at Newcastle, in consequence of the refusal of a fortnight's leave. Cromwell suggested to the soldiery offering the regimental command to Colonel Monck. However Bright was a friend of Lilburne and his men dismissed the Scots officer as a secret royalist. Bright was reinstated to general acclaim of his men. He was part of the New Model Army command that defeated Sir Marmaduke Langdale's command at Newcastle. And he assisted Cromwell's crushing rout of the Scots army at Battle of Preston, where the enemy army was outflanked.

Bright continued to take an active part in public affairs. In 1651 he was commissioned to raise a regiment to oppose the march of Charles II into England, and he undertook the same service in 1659, on the rising headed by Sir George Booth. Bright was also part of the army command that helped foil the attempted assassination of Lord Protector in 1654.

== Life after the military ==
After his service in the Parliamentary army, he settled down as a country gentleman with estates mainly at Badsworth and Ecclesall. In 1654 he was appointed High Sheriff of Yorkshire, acted as governor of York and of Hull and was appointed MP for the West Riding of Yorkshire in the First Protectorate Parliament. 'He may be presumed to have concurred in the measures for bringing about the Restoration, for we find that as early as July 1660 he was admitted into the order of baronets, having been previously knighted'.

== Marriages ==
Bright married four times. He married first, about 1645, Catherine Lister, daughter of Sir Richard Hawksworth. Secondly, about 1665, he married Elizabeth Norcliffe, daughter of Sir Thomas Norcliffe. In July 1682 he married Susanna Vane, daughter of Sir Thomas Liddell, 2nd baronet, and widow of Thomas Vane. Fourthly he married on 7 June 1683 Susannah Wharton, daughter of Michael Wharton. He left his estates to his grandson John Liddell, son of his only surviving child, Catherine, wife of Sir Henry Liddell, 3rd Baronet of Ravensworth Castle, Durham. John Liddell assumed the name of Bright on coming into his estates.

== Death ==
He died on 13 October 1688 and was buried in Badsworth church.

Baronetage of England
New creation	Baronet (of Badsworth); 1660–1688	Extinct
