= Mary Dawes Blackett =

English author

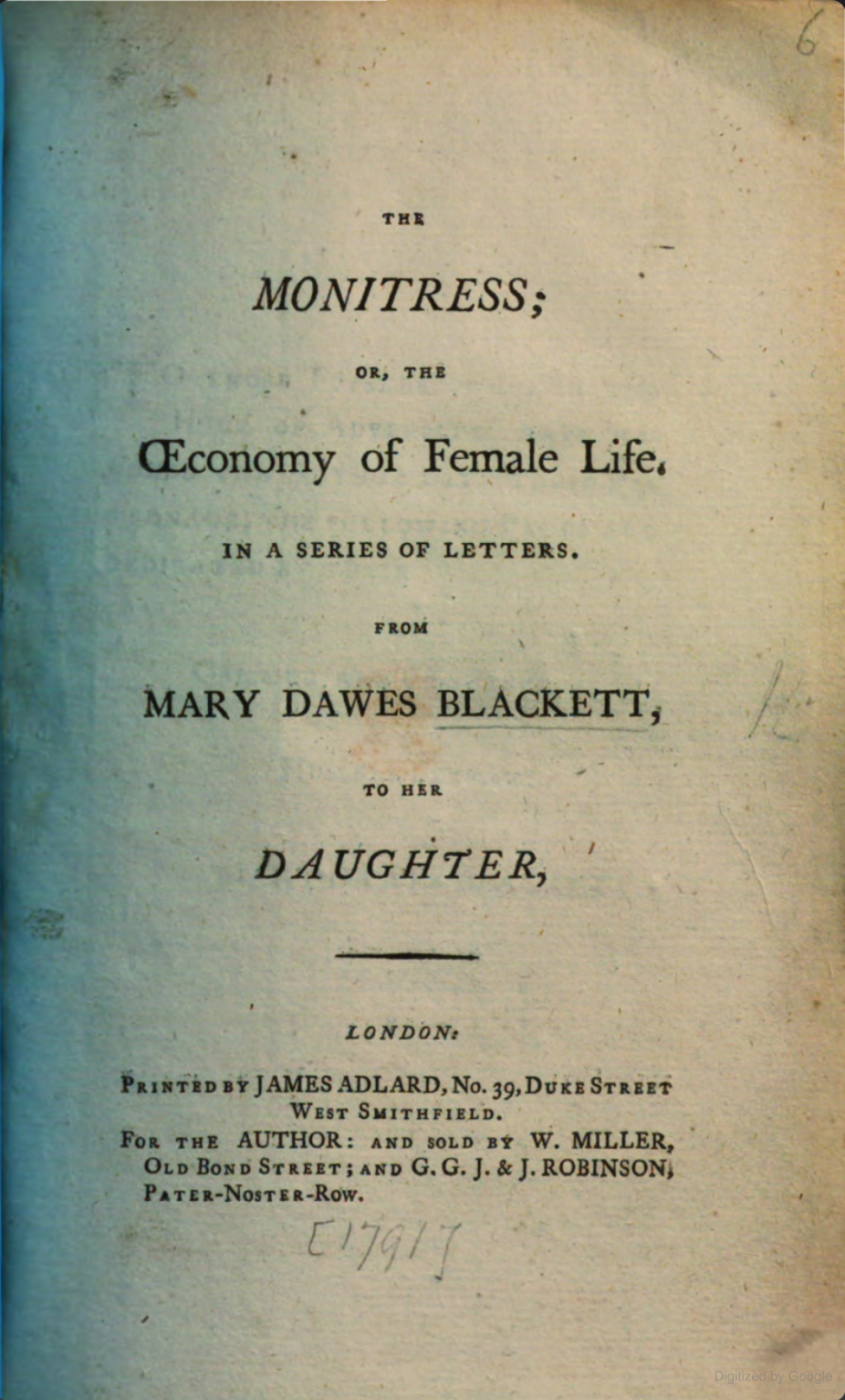
- Title page of Mary Dawes Blackett's The mointress; or, The Œ conomy of female life. In a series of letters. London, 1791.
- Born: Mary Dawes
- Died: 1792; Vauxhall, South London
- Resting place: St. Mary-at-Lambeth
- Occupation: writer
- Spouse: Thomas Blackett
- Children: Catherine Blackett (daughter)
- Writing career
- Language: English
- Years active: (fl. 1786-1791)
- Period: Romantic era
- Notable works: Suicide; a poem (1789)

Mary Ann Dawes Blackett (fl. 1786-1791) was an English writer of two collections of poetry and one book of conduct literature. Her Suicide; a poem (1789) addressed what was considered by foreigners and English alike to be a pressing national problem.

== Life ==
The little that is known of Blackett's life comes mainly from the genealogical research of the Blackett family or from her own writings. Details of her birth and antecedents are unknown. She was likely married to one Thomas Blackett of Bloomsbury, though the records are not definitive. Her husband was probably a Roman Catholic as by her own account her only daughter, Catherine (born c. 1773?), was educated in a convent in Nice despite Blackett herself being Protestant. Based on references in her writings, it would appear that Blackett was widowed, and also suffered the loss of a brother at sea. The details of her death are better known: she died in Vauxhall, now part of south London, and was buried at St. Mary’s, Lambeth on 8 August 1792.

== Work ==
Blackett apparently had many acquaintances, including poet Thomas Chatterton. She published three known works: two poetic and one a series of letters to her daughter. All three works were "printed for the author" (i.e. self-published).

'The antichamber; a poem, in three cantos" (1786) is a satire on courtiers. Only the first canto, 158 lines of heroic couplets, was published.

Suicide; a poem (1789), 402 lines of heroic couplets, is inscribed to Richard Cosway. In this "ode to Chatterton," Blackett addresses the presumed English predisposition to suicide, which she describes as a "horrid Mania" that calls "for the most serious consideration." The poem critiques the death penalty for inuring the population to death, describes six suicides, and offers a message of fortitude in adversity.

The mointress (1791) is a piece of conduct literature in the form of letters addressed to her daughter.

== Works ==
=== Poetry ===
- The antichamber; a poem, in three cantos. ... By M. Blackett. London: printed for the author, by T. Bensley; and sold by James Ridgway, 1786.
- Suicide; a poem. Inscribed, by permission, to Richard Cosway, principal painter to His Royal Highness the Prince of Wales. By Mary Dawes Blackett. London: printed by W. Justins, for the author; and sold by Robinson, Pater-noster-row; Debrett, Piccadilly; Edwards, Pall Mall Sewell [sic], Cornhill; and Hodgson, Newcastle upon Tyne, 1789.

=== Conduct literature ===
- The mointress; or, The Œ conomy of female life. In a series of letters. From Mary Daws Blackett, to her daughter. London: Printed by James Adlard, No. 39, Duke Street West Smithfield. For the author: and sold by W. Miller, Old Bond Street; and G.G.J. & J. Robinson, Pater-Noster-Row, 1791.

== Etexts ==
- The mointress; or, The Œ conomy of female life. In a series of letters. From Mary Daws Blackett, to her daughter. London: Printed by James Adlard, No. 39, Duke Street West Smithfield. For the author: and sold by W. Miller, Old Bond Street; and G.G.J. & J. Robinson, Pater-Noster-Row, 1791.(Google Books)

== External sites ==
- Works by Mary Dawes Blackett at Project Gutenberg
- Works by or about Mary Dawes Blackett at the Internet Archive
- Author: Blackett, Mary Dawes, Jackson Bibliography of Romantic Poetry, UofT Libraries.
- "Blackett, Mary Dawes." The Women's Print History Project, 2019, Person ID 2147. Accessed 2022-08-26.
- "Mary Dawes Blackett." Shakeosphere: mapping early-modern social networks. University of Iowa.
