= Bill Foster =

Bill Foster may refer to:

== Sports ==
- Bill Foster (baseball) (1904–1978), Negro leagues baseball player
- Bill Foster (basketball, born 1929) (1929–2016), college basketball head coach at Rutgers, Utah, Duke, South Carolina, and Northwestern
- Bill Foster (basketball, born 1936) (1936–2015), college basketball head coach at Charlotte, Miami, Clemson, and Virginia Tech

== Politics ==
- Bill I. Foster (1946–2025), American politician, Missouri state senator
- Bill Foster (politician) (born 1955), U.S. Congressman (D-IL), physicist
- Bill Foster (mayor) (born 1963), mayor of St. Petersburg, Florida

== Entertainment ==
- Bill Foster (director) (1932–2011), television director
- Bill Foster (character), Marvel Comics superhero known variously as Black Goliath, Giant-Man, and Goliath

== See also ==
- Billy Foster (1937–1967), Canadian racecar driver
- William Foster (disambiguation)
