= Matfen =

Village in Northumberland, England

Coordinates: 55°02′28″N 1°57′14″W

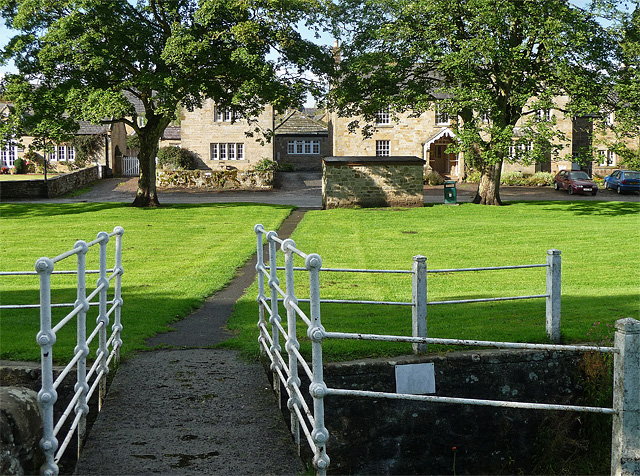
- Matfen

- Location within Northumberland
- Population: 495 (2001 census)
- OS grid reference: NZ029719
- Civil parish: Matfen
- Unitary authority: Northumberland
- Ceremonial county: Northumberland
- Region: North East
- Country: England
- Sovereign state: United Kingdom
- Post town: NEWCASTLE UPON TYNE
- Postcode district: NE20
- Dialling code: 01661
- Police: Northumbria
- Fire: Northumberland
- Ambulance: North East
- UK Parliament: Hexham

Matfen is a village and a civil parish in Northumberland, England, near the town of Hexham and the city of Newcastle upon Tyne. It is an example of a 19th-century planned estate village. It was the birthplace of the 7th Premier of British Columbia, William Smithe. In 2001 it had a population of 495.

== History ==
Matfen is a few miles north of Hadrian's Wall. About halfway between the two there is a prehistoric standing stone called Stob Stone, adjacent to Standing Stone Farmhouse. The stone is about seven feet high and decorated with cup marks.

The place-name Matfen is first attested in the Pipe Rolls for 1159, where it appears as Matefen. The name means Matta's fen. The civil parish was formed in 1955 from East Matfen, Fenwick, Ingoe, Kearsley, Ryal and West Matfen.

== Landmarks ==
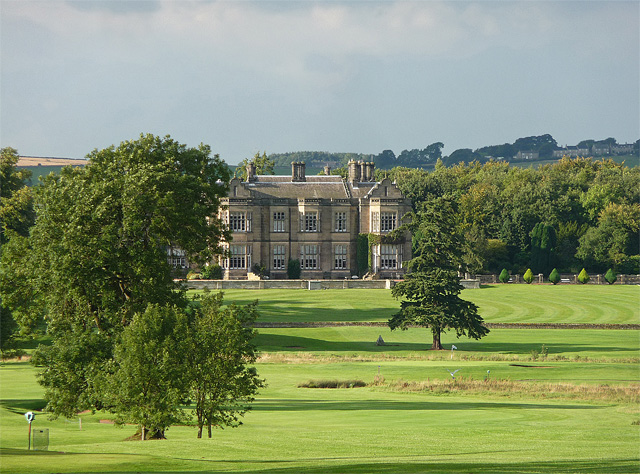
Matfen Hall

Matfen Hall now houses a hotel and country club. The Grade II* listed building was built about 1828 by Sir Edward Blackett to replace an earlier, 17th-century house.

The Devil's Causeway passes the village less than 2 miles (3 km) to the west. The causeway is a Roman road, which starts at Port Gate on Hadrian's Wall, north of Corbridge, and extends 55 miles (89 km) northwards across Northumberland to the mouth of the Tweed at Berwick-upon-Tweed.

== Notable people ==
- Thomas Bates (1775–1849), an eminent stockbreeder, was born in Matfen.
- William Smithe (1842–1887), the 7th premier of British Columbia, was born in Matfen.
- Lorna Hill (1902–1991), a writer of over 40 books for children, was the wife of the rector of Matfen.

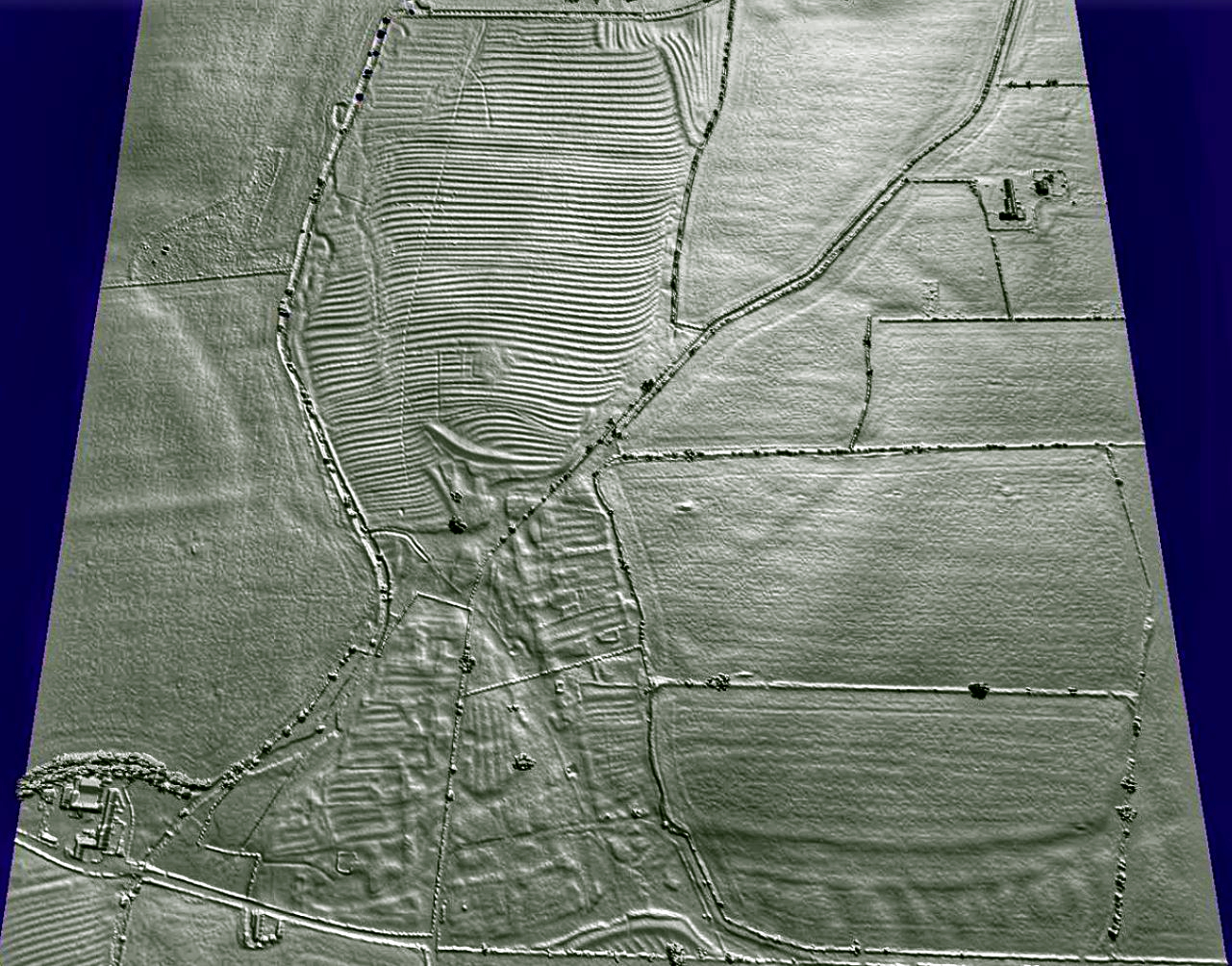
An oblique lidar view of East Matfen deserted Medieval village
