= Blanchland =

Village in Northumberland, England

Coordinates: 54.848°N 2.055°W

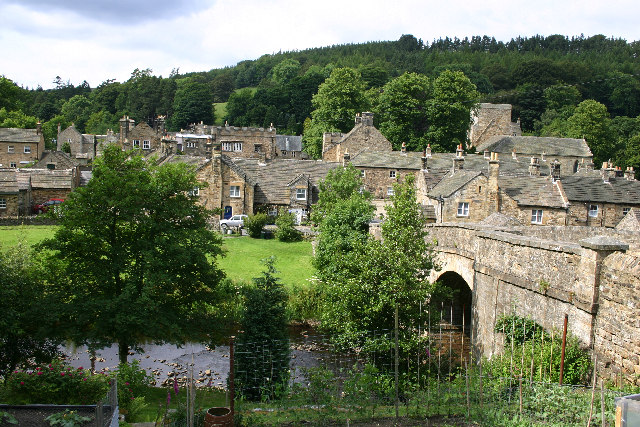

- Location within Northumberland
- Population: 135 (2011)
- OS grid reference: NY965504
- Civil parish: Blanchland
- Unitary authority: Northumberland
- Ceremonial county: Northumberland
- Region: North East
- Country: England
- Sovereign state: United Kingdom
- Post town: CONSETT
- Postcode district: DH8
- Dialling code: 01434
- Police: Northumbria
- Fire: Northumberland
- Ambulance: North East
- UK Parliament: Hexham

Blanchland is a village and civil parish in Northumberland, England, on the County Durham boundary. The population of the parish at the 2011 census was 135.

Set beside the river in a wooded section of the Derwent valley, Blanchland is an attractive small village in the North Pennines Area of Outstanding Natural Beauty.

Blanchland was formed out of the medieval Blanchland Abbey property by Nathaniel Crew, 3rd Baron Crew, the Bishop of Durham, 1674–1722. It is a conservation village, largely built of stone from the remains of the 12th-century Abbey. It features picturesque houses, set against a backdrop of deep woods and open moors. Located near the Derwent Reservoir, it provides facilities for sailing and fishing.

The Lord Crewe Arms Hotel has a vast fireplace where 'General' Tom Forster hid during the Jacobite rising of 1715. W. H. Auden stayed at the Lord Crewe Arms with fellow student Gabriel Carritt at Easter 1930, and later remarked that no place held sweeter memories. Writer Emily Elizabeth Shaw Beavan lived and wrote here when her husband worked at Derwent Mines. Blanchland may have been the model for the village in which was set the opening and closing scenes of Auden and Isherwood's play The Dog Beneath the Skin (1935). Another poet Philip Larkin used to dine at the hotel when staying with Monica Jones in Haydon Bridge. In July 1969, Benjamin Britten and Peter Pears stayed at the Inn.

Scenes in the fictional town of Stoneybridge in the first three series of the CBBC programme Wolfblood were filmed in the village.

Its qualities make it a frequent setting for period films, set in the 18th century, such as those based on the novels of Catherine Cookson.

Until 1 April 1955 the parish was called Shotley High Quarter.

== Education ==
It is in the catchment area for Queen Elizabeth High School, Hexham.
