= Blackett baronets =

Title in the Baronetage of England

Escutcheon of the Blackett baronets of Newcastle, used also by the 1685 baronetcy

There have been two baronetcies created for members of the Blackett family, both in the Baronetage of England. One creation is extant as of 2013. The Blackett family can be traced back to the Blacketts/Blakheveds of Woodcroft, County Durham, some of whom became highly successful in the lead and coal mining industries in Northumberland and County Durham.

The Blackett Baronetcy, of Newcastle in the County of Northumberland, was created in the Baronetage of England on 12 December 1673 for William Blackett, Member of Parliament for Newcastle-upon-Tyne. Blackett was succeeded by his elder son, Edward, the second Baronet who represented Ripon and Northumberland in the House of Commons and built Newby Hall. William's third younger son William was created a baronet in his own right in 1685 (see below). The second Baronet's eldest surviving son, Edward, the third Baronet, was a captain in the Royal Navy. He died childless in 1756 and was succeeded by his nephew, Edward, the fourth Baronet, who was Member of Parliament for Northumberland and the son of John Blackett. The title thereafter descended from father to son until the death of Charles, the ninth Baronet, in 1968. Two of his younger brothers, George, the tenth Baronet, and Francis, the eleventh Baronet, both succeeded in the title. As of 2013 the title is held by the latter's eldest son, Hugh, the twelfth Baronet, who succeeded in 1995. Another member of the family to gain distinction was Henry Blackett (1867–1952), son of John Charles Blackett, fourth son of the fourth Baronet. He was an Admiral in the Royal Navy.

The family seat was Matfen Hall, Matfen, Northumberland, now a hotel and country club. It is now the nearby Halton Castle, Northumberland.

The Blackett Baronetcy, of Newcastle-upon-Tyne in the County of Northumberland, was created in the Baronetage of England on 23 January 1685 for William Blackett, third son of the first Baronet of the 1673 creation. He sat as Member of Parliament for Newcastle-upon-Tyne. On his death the title passed to his son, William, the second Baronet. He also represented Newcastle-upon-Tyne in the House of Commons. Blackett had no legitimate issue and the title became extinct on his death in 1728. His illegitimate daughter Elizabeth married Sir Walter Calverley-Blackett, 2nd Baronet, who assumed the additional surname of Blackett (see Calverley-Blackett baronets for more information on this title).

== Blackett baronets, of Newcastle (1673) ==
- Sir William Blackett, 1st Baronet (1621–1680)
- Sir Edward Blackett, 2nd Baronet (1649–1718)
- Sir Edward Blackett, 3rd Baronet (1683–1 March 1756). Blackett was the eldest surviving son of Sir Edward Blackett, 2nd Baronet, and his wife Mary, daughter of Sir John Yorke. He served in the Royal Navy and achieved the rank of captain. Blackett married Mary, daughter of Reverend Thomas Jekyll. They had no children. He died in March 1756 and was buried in Ripon, Yorkshire. The baronetcy devolved on his nephew, Edward. Lady Blackett only survived her husband by nine months and died in November 1756.
- Sir Edward Blackett, 4th Baronet (1719–1804)
- Sir William Blackett, 5th Baronet (16 February 1759 – 27 October 1816). Blackett succeeded to the baronetcy on the death of his father, Sir Edward Blackett, 4th Baronet, in 1804, and was educated at Trinity College, Oxford. He was High Sheriff of Northumberland in 1807/8. Blackett married Mary Anne Keene and their home was Matfen Hall, Matfen, Northumberland. He died at Westoe Lodge, Cambridge, and was succeeded by his son Edward.
- Sir Edward Blackett, 6th Baronet DL JP (23 February 1805 – 23 November 1885). Blackett succeeded to the baronetcy on the death of his father Sir Edward Blackett, 5th Baronet, in 1816. He was educated at Eton College and Christ Church, Oxford, and served in the army in the 1st Life Guards. He was also a Justice of the Peace, Deputy Lieutenant of Northumberland (23 July 1831), and High Sheriff of Northumberland in 1833, and constructed the new mansion house at Matfen Hall, Matfen, Northumberland, in 1828. Blackett married four times; in 1830 to Julia Monck, the mother of all his children, in 1851 to Francis Vere (Lorane) Ord (d. 29 May 1874), widow of William Ord of Whitfield, in 1875 to Isabella Richardson and finally in 1880 to Alethea Rianette Scott. He died on 23 November 1885 at Matfen Hall, Matfen, and was succeeded by his son Edward.
- Sir Edward William Blackett, 7th Baronet CB (22 March 1831 – 13 September 1909). Blackett was the son of Sir Edward Blackett, 6th Baronet. He succeeded to the baronetcy on the death of his father in 1885. He was educated at Eton College and served in the Rifle Brigade in the Crimean War and was seriously injured at the Sebastopol Redan. He was promoted to Colonel in 1878, in which year he was Aide de Camp to HM Queen Victoria and was appointed Companion of the Order of the Bath. He was also High Sheriff of Northumberland in 1889. Blackett married Julia Frances Somerville, daughter and co-heiress of Kenelm Somerville, 17th Lord Somerville. He was succeeded by his son Hugh.
- Sir Hugh Douglas Blackett, 8th Baronet (24 March 1873 – 13 November 1960). Blackett was the eldest son of Colonel Sir Edward Blackett, 7th Baronet, by his wife the Hon. Julia (née Somerville). He was a captain in the Northumberland Yeomanry and served as High Sheriff of Northumberland in 1914. He was also a Justice of the Peace for the county. Blackett married Helen Katharine, daughter of George William Lowther, in 1903, by whom he had several children. Lady Blackett died in January 1943. Blackett survived her by seventeen years and died in November 1960, aged 87. He was succeeded in the baronetcy by his eldest son, Charles.
- Sir Charles Douglas Blackett, 9th Baronet (1904–1968)
- Sir George William Blackett, 10th Baronet (1906–1994)
- Sir Francis Hugh Blackett, 11th Baronet (1907–1995)
- Sir Hugh Francis Blackett, 12th Baronet (born 1955)

The heir apparent is the present holder's son Henry Douglas Blackett (born 1992)

== Blackett baronets, of Newcastle-upon-Tyne (1685) ==
- Sir William Blackett, 1st Baronet (1657–1705)
- Sir William Blackett, 2nd Baronet (1690–1728)

== See also ==
- Calverley-Blackett baronets
- Blackett
- Blackett of Wylam
