= Sir Henry Liddell, 3rd Baronet =

English politician (died 1723)

Sir Henry Liddell, 3rd Baronet (c. 1644 – 1 September 1723) was an English politician and peer. He sat as MP for the City of Durham in 1689 and 1695 and as MP for Newcastle-upon-Tyne in February 1701, December 1701, 1702, 2 January 1706 and 1708.

He was the first son of Sir Thomas Liddell, 2nd Baronet and Anne, the daughter of Sir Henry Vane. He entered the Inner Temple in 1662. By 1670, he married Catherine, the daughter of Sir John Bright, 1st Baronet and they had five sons (one predeceased him) and one daughter. He succeeded his father as 3rd Baronet and owner of Ravensworth Castle, Lamesley in November 1697.
