= Ferdinando Forster =

English army officer and Whig politician

Ferdinando Forster (14 February 1670 – 23 August 1701) was an English army officer and Whig politician. He was murdered by John Fenwick following a political argument.

== Biography ==
Forster was the third son of Sir William Forster of Bamburgh Castle and Dorothy, daughter and heiress of Sir William Selby of Twizell. He was named after his great-grandfather, Ferdinando Fairfax, 2nd Lord Fairfax of Cameron. He was educated at Durham School and St John's College, Cambridge, before entering Gray's Inn in 1686. The previous year, he had gained his first army commission in the Holland Regiment aged only 15. In 1688, he left his studies and returned to the army; he was promoted to captain in 1689, but he resigned this commission in 1691.

In September 1700 he inherited the heavily indebted family estates from his deceased elder brother, William Forster. He also won election to the House of Commons of England as a Member of Parliament for Northumberland, a seat held previously his brother. He was returned as the MP at the January 1701 English general election and was listed as a Court supporter and among those who voted in favour of the extension of the Great Mortgage in the Act of Settlement 1701.

=== Murder ===
On 22 August 1701, while attending a dinner in Newcastle upon Tyne, he quarreled with another northern landowner, John Fenwick of Rock, who was singing High Tory songs and laments for Sir John Fenwick, 3rd Baronet. Forster commented that there were "too many such [i.e. Tories] in the House". The men were prevented from fighting at the dinner, but they met in Newcastle the following day in order to duel. Forster was killed in the ensuing skirmish, having slipped on the ground and then stabbed by Fenwick. Fenwick was arrested and executed for murder in Newcastle the following year; the authorities had to bar the city gates to prevent any attempt by Fenwick's supporters to rescue the condemned man.

Forster's sister, Dorothy, erected a memorial to him in the chancel of St Aidan's Church, Bamburgh.

Parliament of England
Preceded by William Forster; Sir Edward Blackett, Bt	Member of Parliament for Northumberland; 1700–1701; With: Hon. William Howard	Succeeded by Sir Francis Blake; William Loraine
