= William Carr (Newcastle-upon-Tyne MP, died 1720) =

English politician (1664–1720)

William Carr (8 December 1664 – 4 June 1720) was an English politician. He sat as MP for Newcastle-upon-Tyne from 1690 till 1710.

He was the second son of William Carr and Mary. He was matriculated at University College, Oxford in 1683. He entered Lincoln's Inn in 1692. He married Elizabeth and they had one son.
