= William Forster =

William Forster may refer to:

- William Forster (MP for Berkshire) (died 1575), English politician
- William Forster (MP for Northumberland) (1667–1700), English politician
- William Forster (bishop) (died 1635), Church of England bishop of Sodor and Man
- William Forster (mathematician) (fl. 1632–1673), English mathematician
- William Forster (philanthropist) (1784–1854), English Quaker preacher and philanthropist
- William Forster (British Army officer) (1798–1870), British Army general
- William Forster (Australian politician) (1818–1882), premier of New South Wales and poet
- William Edward Forster (1818–1886), British statesman, Liberal MP, and chief secretary for Ireland
- William Mark Forster (1846–1921), Australian philanthropist
- William Thomas Forster (1857–1938), Canadian politician
- Bill Forster (footballer) (1879–1962), English footballer
- William Forster (cricketer) (1884–1930), Australian cricketer
- William Forster (judge) (1921–1997), Australian lawyer, first chief justice of the Northern Territory
- William H. Forster (born 1939), U.S. Army lieutenant general
- Will Forster, British Liberal Democrat politician, MP for Woking
- William Forster (priest) (1760–1823), Anglican priest in Ireland

== See also ==
- William Forster Lloyd (1794–1852), British economist
- Henry William Forster, 1st Baron Forster (1866–1936), British politician, governor-general of Australia
- William Foster (disambiguation)
