= Sir Edward Blackett, 2nd Baronet =

English politician (1649–1718)

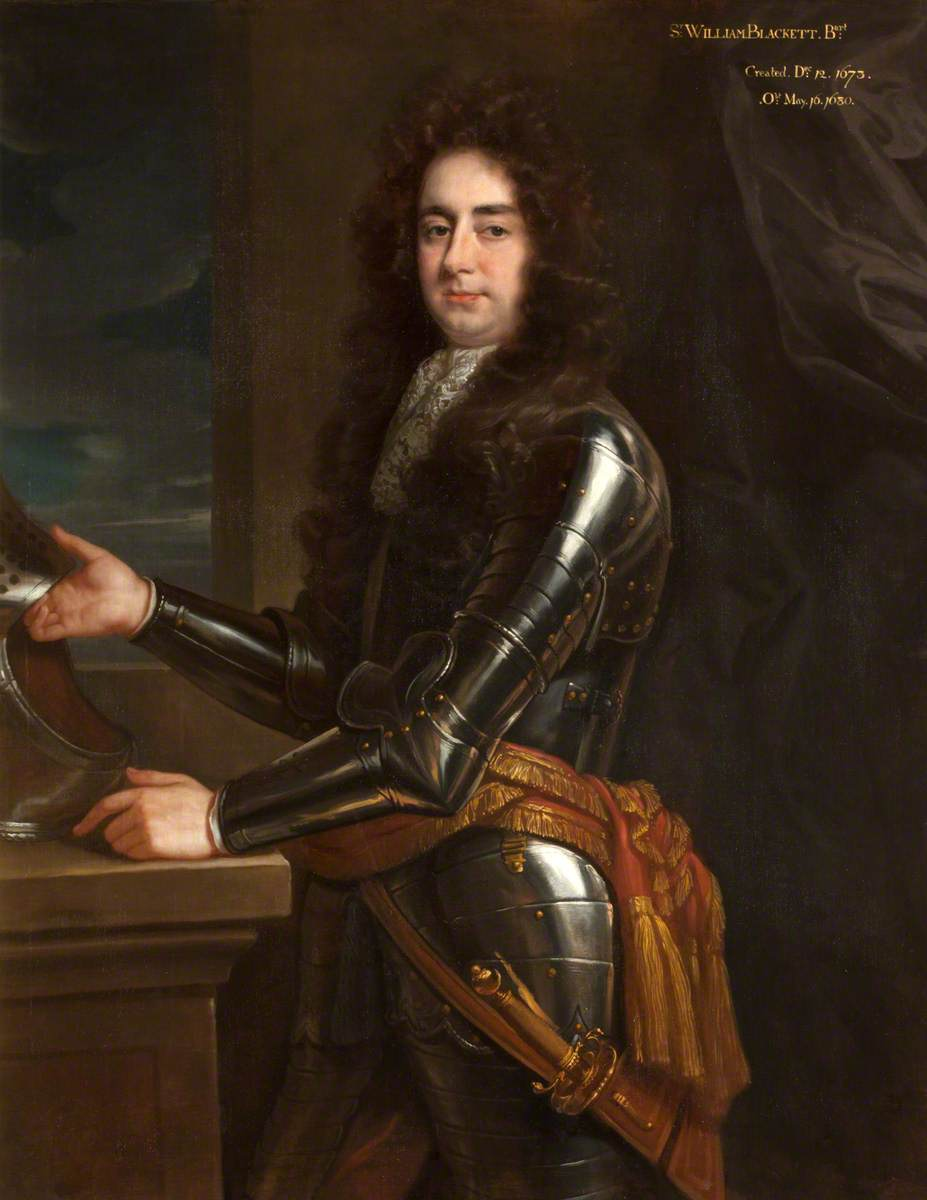
Portrait by John Riley

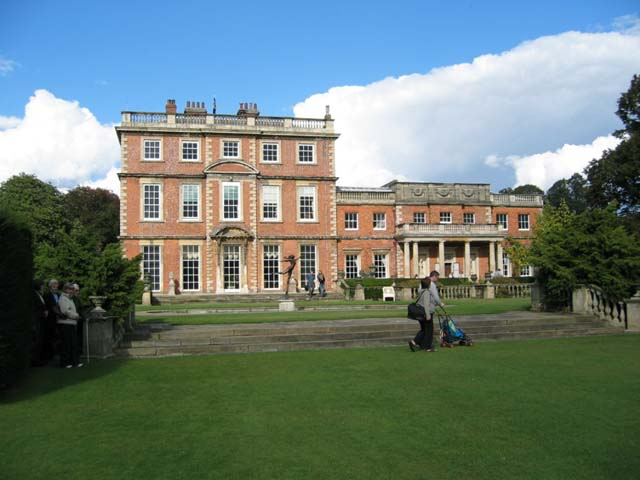
Newby Hall

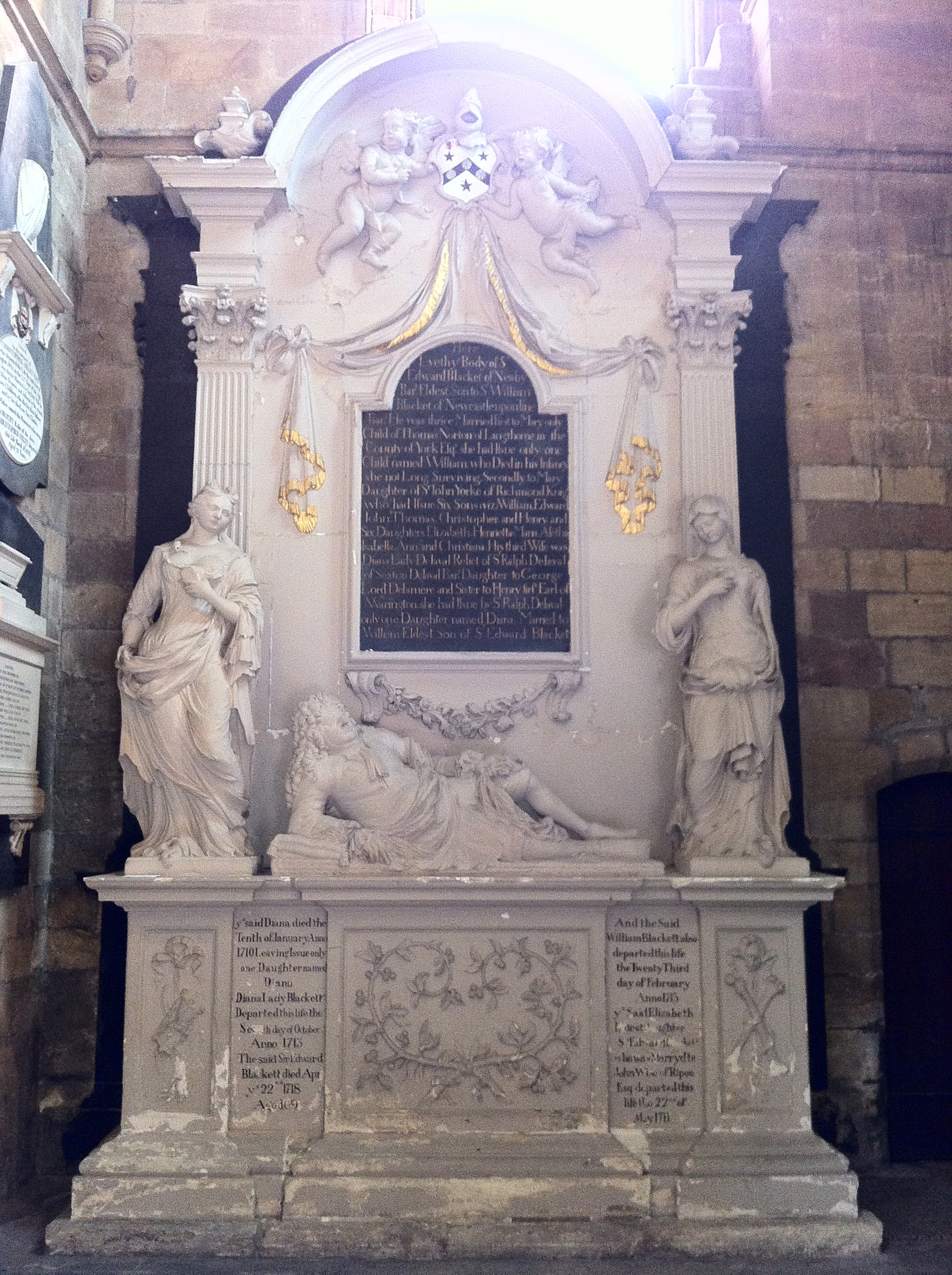
Memorial to Edward Blacket in Ripon Cathedral

Sir Edward Blackett, 2nd Baronet (25 October 1649 – 23 April 1718) was an English landowner and politician who sat in the House of Commons at various times between 1689 and 1701.

== Early life ==
Blackett was the eldest surviving son of William Blackett and his wife Elizabeth Kirkley. His father was a merchant of Newcastle and owned extensive property including coal mines. Blackett became a member of the Merchant Adventurers' company of Newcastle-upon-Tyne in 1672. He married an heiress in 1674 and at some time after he acquired the estate of Newby Park at Ripon, Yorkshire.

== Career ==
He was a J.P. for Northumberland and the North Riding of Yorkshire from 1677 and J.P, for Ripon from 1679. From 1679 to 1680, he was High Sheriff of Northumberland which was during the Popish Plot and he was active in levying fines on recusants. However he was probably an opponent of exclusion, because he stayed on the commissions of the peace in 1680. He succeeded to the baronetcy on the death of his father in 1680. In 1684 he became a member of the Hostmen of Newcastle-upon-Tyne. As a J.P. in the North Riding he responded to the questions on the Test Act and Penal Laws in February 1688 but he was removed from the commission of peace later in the year 1688. He became freeman of Ripon in September 1688 and was re-appointed J.P. for Northumberland and the North Riding in 1689. He also became commissioner for assessment for Yorkshire West and North Riding and Northumberland.

Also in 1689, Blackett was elected Member of Parliament for Ripon for a year from 1689 to 1690.

He demolished the old house on the Newby estate and in 1695 with the assistance of Sir Christopher Wren began building Newby Hall at a cost of £32,000, which remained the family seat until 1748.

He was elected MP for Northumberland in 1698 and sat until 1700.

Blackett died at the age of 67 and was buried in Ripon Minster.

== Marriage and issue ==
Blackett married his first wife, Mary Norton, only child and heiress of Thomas Norton of Langthorpe Yorkshire, in 1674. She died without surviving issue. His second wife, whom he married in 1676, was Mary Yorke, only daughter of Sir John Yorke of Gowthwaite, and they had a large family. Finally, in 1699 he married his third and last wife, Lady Diana Delaval, widow of Sir Ralph Delaval and daughter of George Booth, 1st Baron Delamer. He was succeeded in the baronetcy by his eldest surviving son by his second marriage Edward who had been a captain in the Royal Navy until he became heir to the estates on the death of his elder brother in 1714.

== See also ==
- Blackett

Parliament of England
Preceded by Gilbert Dolben; Sir Edmund Jennings	Member of Parliament for Ripon; 1689 – 1690; With: Sir Jonathan Jennings	Succeeded by Sir Jonathan Jennings; Sir Edmund Jennings
Preceded by William Forster; Philip Bickerstaffe	Member of Parliament for Northumberland; 1698 – Jan. 1701; With: William Forster 1698–1700	Succeeded by Ferdinando Forster; William Howard
Baronetage of England
Preceded by William Blackett	Baronet (of Matfen Hall); 1695–1718	Succeeded by Edward Blackett
