= Haswell =

Haswell may refer to:

== Places ==
- Haswell, County Durham, England
- Haswell, Colorado, US
- Haswell Islands, an Antarctic island chain
  - Haswell Island, the largest of the Haswell Islands

== Other uses ==
- Haswell (surname)
- Haswell (microarchitecture), the Intel codename for a processor (CPU) microarchitecture
- 23809 Haswell, an asteroid

== See also ==
- High Haswell, a village
- Haswell Moor
- Haswell Plough, a village
- Haswell Grange, a former monastery
- Haswell's frog
- Isaac M. Haswell House, in Albany County, New York, US
- Haswell New Instructions, an expansion of the AVX instruction set for the Haswell processor
