= Mayor Anderson =

Mayor Anderson may refer to:

== United States ==
- A. Scott Anderson (1904–1971), mayor of Richmond, Virginia
- Andrew Anderson (mayor) (1795–1867), mayor of Nashville, Tennessee
- Brent F. Anderson (1932–2013), mayor of West Valley City, Utah
- C. Elmer Anderson (1912–1998), mayor of Brainerd, Minnesota
- Charles Anderson (mayor) (1875–1949), mayor of Murray, Utah
- Edward Clifford Anderson (1815–1883), mayor of Savannah, Georgia
- Eileen Anderson (1928–2021), mayor of Honolulu, Hawaii
- Irma Anderson (1931–2024), mayor of Richmond, California
- Jessica Anderson (mayor) (born 1978), mayor of Chapel Hill, North Carolina
- John Anderson (Wisconsin politician, born 1870) (1870–1954), mayor of Barron, Wisconsin
- Patricia Anderson (born 1966), mayor of Eagan, Minnesota
- Robert Anderson (mayor), mayor of Williamsburg, Virginia
- Rocky Anderson (born 1951), mayor of Salt Lake City, Utah
- Roland B. Anderson (1913–2010), mayor of Naples, Florida
- Tonya Anderson (born 1969), mayor of Lithonia, Georgia
- William A. Anderson (1873–1954), mayor of Minneapolis, Minnesota
- William Dozier Anderson (1862–1952), mayor of Tupelo, Mississippi

== Other ==
- A. C. Anderson (1909–1996), mayor of Lethbridge, Canada
- Henry Anderson (merchant) (c. 1484–1559), mayor of Newcastle-upon-Tyne, United Kingdom
- Henry Anderson (politician, born 1545) (1545–1605), mayor of Newcastle-upon-Tyne, United Kingdom
- Joanne Anderson (born 1971), mayor of Liverpool, United Kingdom
- Joe Anderson (politician) (born 1958), mayor of Liverpool, United Kingdom
- John Anderson (mayor) (1820–1897), mayor of Christchurch, New Zealand
- Robert Alexander Anderson (politician) (1856-1916), mayor of Vancouver, Canada
- William Anderson (New Zealand politician) (1888–1978), mayor of Queenstown Borough, New Zealand

== See also ==
- List of mayors of Anderson, Indiana, United States
