= Sir Thomas Liddell, 1st Baronet =

English politician

Captain Sir Thomas Liddell, 1st Baronet (1578 – 1652) was an English cavalier politician of the Liddell family of the North of England during the 16th and 17th centuries.

== Family ==
Liddell, who was born in 1578, was the son of Thomas Liddell (d. 1619) and the same's wife Margaret Watson, who was daughter of John Watson Alderman of Newcastle.

His father Thomas (d. 1619), who was a merchant of corn and coal, bought Ravensworth Castle in 1607 after he had served as Sheriff of Newcastle in 1592-93 and as Mayor of Newcastle in 1597 and 1609.

His paternal grandfather Thomas Liddell of Newcastle-upon-Tyne (d. 1577) was a merchant adventurer who also had served as Sheriff of Newcastle, in 1563-64, and as Mayor of Newcastle, in 1572–3.

== Politics and the Civil War ==
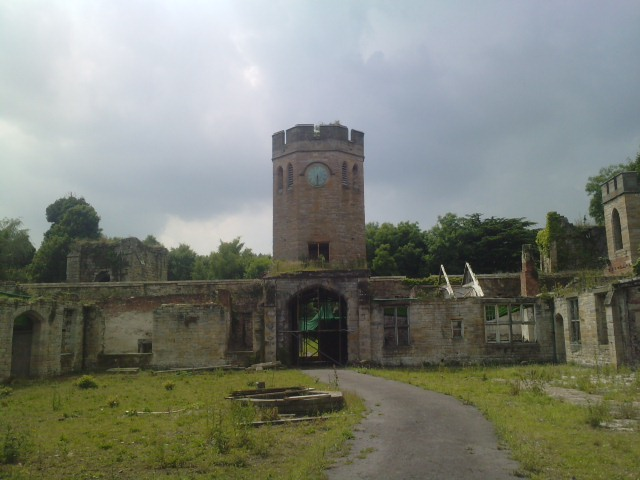
Ravensworth Castle, now derelict

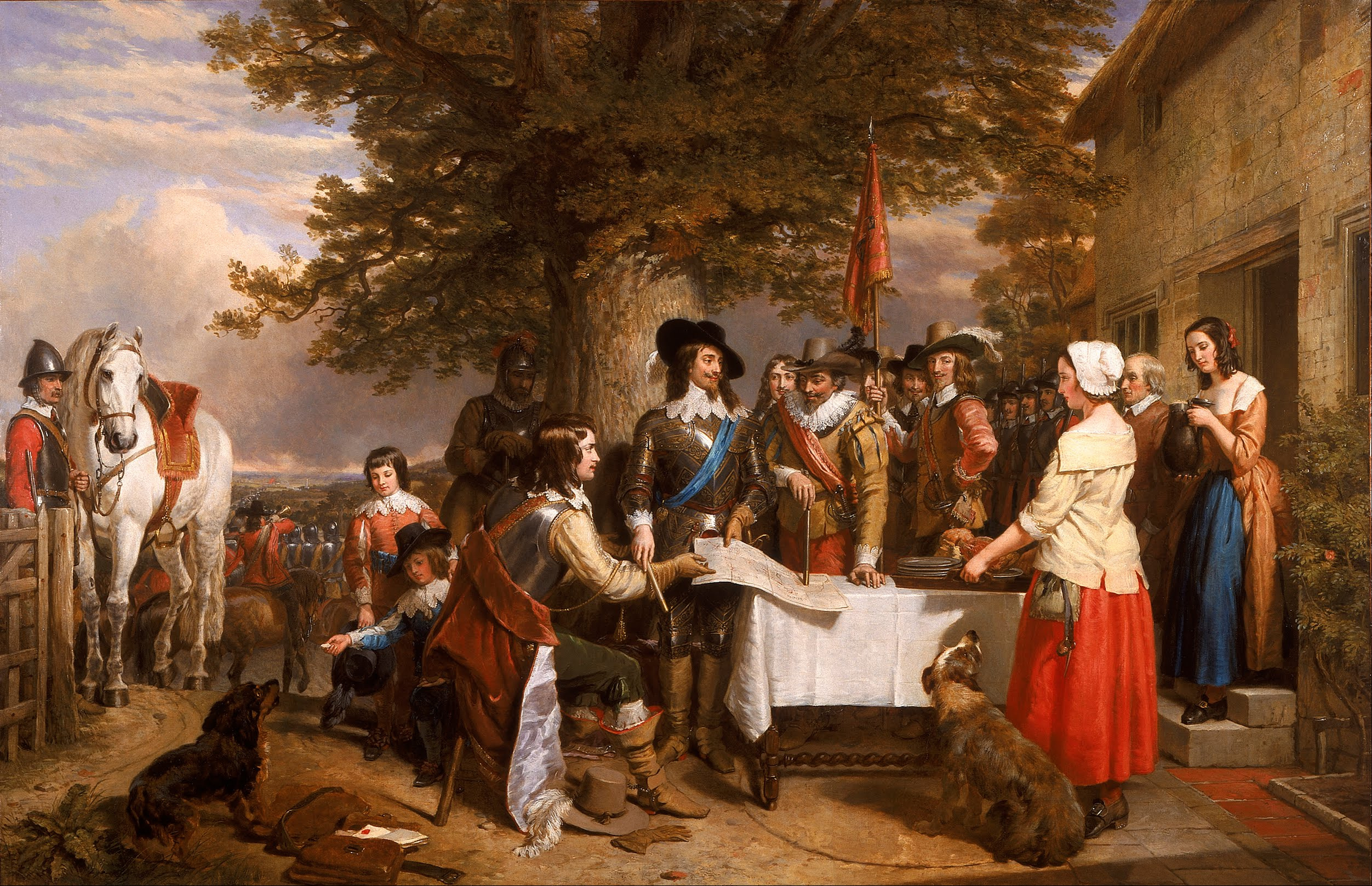
The Eve of the Battle of Edgehill by Charles Landseer, 1845. Liddell supplied horses to the royalist army for the Battle of Edgehill, at which he fought for Charles I, who afterwards created him a baronet.

Liddell was a Catholic Recusant who succeeded to Ravensworth Castle in 1615, and who also owned the Redheugh estate in County Durham. He was admitted to Gray's Inn on 15 March 1620.

Liddell served as Sheriff of Newcastle in 1609 and Mayor in 1625, 1634, and 1636. He was in April 1640 elected Member of Parliament for Newcastle-upon-Tyne in the Short Parliament. He was created a baronet on 2 November 1642.

He served as a trained band Captain before he was commissioned into the royalist army in August 1642 and served as a Commissioner of Array. He smuggled arms to the royalist army and attempted to disenfranchise Parliamentarian sympathizers amongst the aldermen of Newcastle.

He fought at the Battle of Edgehill, for which he supplied horses to the royalist army, and was in the royalist garrison at Newcastle during the Siege of Newcastle. He wrote the intransigent replies that the Parliamentarian army received in reply to their demands for the surrender of the royalist garrison. He was taken prisoner by the Parliamentarian army when they defeated that royalist garrison in 1644.

He was, in London in 1646, fined £4,000 as 'one of the most notorious delinquents in the country', but was released during the same year on the condition that he pay a fine, which he during 1652 unsuccessfully attempted to dishonestly convince the Parliamentarian government that he had paid to Sir Arthur Haselrig, 2nd Baronet, when he had not done so.

== Issue ==
In 1596, Liddell married Isabel Anderson, who was daughter of Henry Anderson of Haswell, by whom he had 14 children, most of whom, including his eldest son Thomas, predeceased him.

He was succeeded in the baronetcy by his grandson Sir Thomas Liddell, 2nd Baronet, who was an infantry colonel of the Parliamentarian regime in 1659, and who married a daughter of the Parliamentarian Sir Henry Vane the Younger.

== Sir Francis Liddell (1607–1680) ==
The second son of Sir Thomas, Francis, was a Major in the royalist army during the English Civil War. Francis was knighted by Charles I in 1643 and styled Sir Francis Liddell of Bamburgh Castle and Redheugh. Sir Francis gave evidence against the future regicide John Blakiston in 1636 and served as Sheriff of Newcastle in 1640. He was fined after the defeat of the Royalist cause in 1649. He served the restored monarchy as Governor of the Hostmen in 1665 and as Mayor of Newcastle in 1666.

=== Descendants ===
Sir Francis married firstly Elizabeth Tonge (d.1643), daughter of Sir George Tonge (d.1639) of Thickley and Denton, County Durham, who was the great-grandson of Henry Clifford, 10th Baron de Clifford. Sir Francis and Elizabeth Tonge had 11 children.

Sir Francis (b.1607) married secondly, as her third husband, Agnes Chaytor (d.1669), who was the daughter of Sir William Chaytor of Croft (d.1640). Agnes Chaytor was a descendant, through the House of Clervaux and the House of Percy, of Edward III and Charlemagne. Agnes Chaytor had previously been married twice, first to Nicholas Forster (d.1636) of Bamburgh Castle, and second to a man surnamed Dawson, of Ripon. The son of Agnes Chaytor/Forster by Sir Francis Liddell (b.1607), who was also called Francis (1633 - 1702), married the daughter of Agnes Chaytor by Nicholas Forster, Frances or Francisca (d.1675).

=== Fenwick Inheritors of Estate ===
Sir Francis and Agnes Chaytor also had a daughter, Agnes Mary, who married The Rev. Edward Fenwick, who succeeded his relation Ralph Fenwick as Vicar of Stamfordham, Northumberland, and who was a grandson of Sir John Fenwick, 1st Baronet. The Fenwicks were a distinguished clergy family from Northumberland.

Edward Fenwick Vicar of Stamfordham's estate at Redheugh, which he inherited from his wife's father Sir Francis Liddell, was sequestrated because he had supported his kinsman James Radclyffe, 3rd Earl of Derwentwater, during the 1715 Jacobite Rising. His eldest son Ambrose succeeded him as Vicar of Stamfordham but died childless during 1732. His younger son Edward (the second), who became Vicar of Kirkwhelpington during 1720 and died during 1734, was the father of Martha Fenwick, who married William Scott of Stokoe, and was the great-grandfather of John Fenwick F. S. A.. (b. 1787).

Parliament of England
Parliament suspended since 1629	Member of Parliament for Newcastle-upon-Tyne; 1640; With: Sir Peter Riddel	Succeeded by Sir Henry Anderson; John Blakiston
Baronetage of England
New creation	Baronet (of Ravensworth Castle); 1642–1650	Succeeded by Thomas Liddell
