= Haswell (surname) =

Haswell is a surname. Notable people with the surname include:

- Anthony Haswell (passenger rail advocate), b. 1931, American lawyer
- Anthony Haswell (printer) (1756–1816), British-American newspaper publisher and postmaster of the Vermont Republic
- Archibald Eliot Haswell Miller (1887—1979), Scottish artist, appears simply with surname Miller or with dual surname Haswell Miller
- Carole Ann Haswell, astrophysicist
- Charles Haynes Haswell (1809–1907), American nautical engineer, politician and author
- Elizabeth Haswell, American biologist
- Jock Haswell, pseudonym of Chetwynd John Drake Haswell (1919-2018), English military and intelligence author
- John Haswell (1812–1897), Scottish-Austrian locomotive design engineer
- Josephine Haswell Miller (1890-1975), born Elizabeth Josephine Cameron, Scottish artist, wife of Archibald E. Haswell Miller
- Keeley Halswelle (1831-1891), born John Keeley Haswell, British artist
- Percy Haswell (1871–1945), American actress
- Robert Haswell (1768–1801?), American maritime trader and naval officer
- Russell Haswell (born 1970), British multidisciplinary artist
- Susanna Rowson (1762–1824), born Susanna Haswell, British-American actress, novelist and educator
- Thomas Haswell (1807–1889), British educator and music composer
- William Aitcheson Haswell (1854–1925), Scottish-Australian zoologist

== See also ==
- Wyndham Halswelle (1882–1915), British Olympian and soldier, sometimes referred to as Haswell in contemporary accounts
