= Bertram Anderson =

English merchant, politician and MP for Newcastle-upon-Tyne (1505–71)

MP for Newcastle-upon-Tyne
- In office 1563–1567 Serving with Sir Robert Brandling
- Preceded by: Robert Lewen; Cuthbert Blount
- Succeeded by: William Carr; William Jenison
- In office 1558–1558 Serving with Robert Lewen
- Preceded by: Sir Robert Brandling; Cuthbert Blount
- Succeeded by: Robert Lewen; Cuthbert Blount
- In office November 1554 – 1555 Serving with John Watson
- Preceded by: Bertram Anderson; Cuthbert Horsley
- Succeeded by: Sir Robert Brandling; Cuthbert Blount
- In office April 1554 – 1554 Serving with Cuthbert Horsley
- Preceded by: Bertram Anderson; Robert Lewen
- Succeeded by: Bertram Anderson; John Watson
- In office March 1553 – 1553 Serving with Robert Lewen
- Preceded by: Sir Francis Leke; Sir Robert Brandling
- Succeeded by: Sir Robert Brandling; Edward Hall
Civic offices
Mayor of Newcastle-upon-Tyne
In office 1563–1564
Preceded by	William Dent
Succeeded by	Sir Robert Brandling
In office 1557–1558
Preceded by	Christopher Mitford
Succeeded by	Oswald Chapman
In office 1551–1552
Preceded by	Robert Brigham
Succeeded by	Robert Lewen
Honorary titles
Sheriff of Newcastle-upon-Tyne
In office 1543–1544
Preceded by	Mark Shafto
Succeeded by	Cuthbert Ellison

Personal details
- Born: 1505 Newcastle-upon-Tyne, Northumberland
- Died: 14 March 1571 (aged 65–66) Newcastle-upon-Tyne, Northumberland
- Spouse: Alice Carr
- Children: Inter alia, Henry Anderson
- Parent: Henry Anderson
- Occupation: Merchant; Politician

Bertram Anderson (1505 – 14 March 1571) was an English merchant, landowner and politician who represented Newcastle-upon-Tyne and served once as Sheriff, three times as Mayor and was elected five times as MP in the House of Commons between 1553 and 1563 and was also Governor of the Merchant Adventurers of Newcastle-upon-Tyne.

== Background ==
Anderson was the son of the Newcastle-upon-Tyne grocer and merchant Henry Anderson (c.1484–1559) and his wife, Anne Orde, the daughter of Robert Orde of Ord, Northumberland.

== Career ==
Anderson was elected Sheriff (1543–44) and Mayor of Newcastle-upon-Tyne (1551–52, 1557–58, 1563–64), and was also Escheator of Northumberland (1555–56). He was elected to Parliament to represent Newcastle-upon-Tyne at the Parliaments of 1553, April 1554, November 1554, 1558, and 1563.

As a merchant, he traded in the Baltic and with the Netherlands, and later extended his interests to coal mining. He also purchased lands in Coken and Haswell, County Durham, among other properties. He later resided at Haswell Grange, Haswell, County Durham. Like his father, he was Governor of the Merchant Adventurers of Newcastle-upon-Tyne (1551–52, 1557–58). Anderson died on 14 March 1571.

== Family ==
Anderson married Alice Carr, the daughter of Ralph or Robert Carr of Newcastle-upon-Tyne. They had five children, including Henry (1545–1605).

== Arms ==
Coat of arms of Bertram Anderson

Notes
The arms of the Andersons of Newcastle-upon-Tyne
Escutcheon
Or, on a chevron Gules between three birds’ heads erased Sable, as many acorns slipped Argent, on a canton Sable three martlets Argent.

== Ancestry ==
Ancestors of Bertram Anderson (1505–71)

8. Richard Anderson of Newcastle-upon-Tyne
4. John Anderson of Newcastle-upon-Tyne
2. Henry Anderson (1484–1559) of Newcastle-upon-Tyne
10. Thomas Lockwood of Newcastle-upon-Tyne
5. Marian Lockwood
11. (Unknown) Stephenson
1. Bertram Anderson (1505–71)
6. Robert Orde of Ord, Northumberland
3. Ann Orde

Parliament of England
Preceded by Robert Lewen; Cuthbert Blount	Member of Parliament for Newcastle upon Tyne; 1563–1567; With: Sir Robert Brandling	Succeeded by William Carr; William Jenison
Preceded by Sir Robert Brandling; Cuthbert Blount	Member of Parliament for Newcastle upon Tyne; 1558–1558; With: Robert Lewen	Succeeded by Robert Lewen; Cuthbert Blount
Preceded by Bertram Anderson; Cuthbert Horsley	Member of Parliament for Newcastle upon Tyne; 1554–1555; With: John Watson	Succeeded by Sir Robert Brandling; Cuthbert Blount
Preceded by Bertram Anderson; Robert Lewen	Member of Parliament for Newcastle upon Tyne; 1554–1554; With: Cuthbert Horsley	Succeeded by Bertram Anderson; John Watson
Preceded by Sir Francis Leke; Sir Robert Brandling	Member of Parliament for Newcastle upon Tyne; 1553–1553; With: Robert Lewen	Succeeded by Sir Robert Brandling; Edward Hall
Civic offices
Preceded by William Dent	Mayor of Newcastle-upon-Tyne; 1563–1564	Succeeded by Sir Robert Brandling
Preceded by Christopher Mitford	Mayor of Newcastle-upon-Tyne; 1557–1558	Succeeded by Oswald Chapman
Preceded by Robert Brigham	Mayor of Newcastle-upon-Tyne; 1551–1552	Succeeded by Robert Lewen
Honorary titles
Preceded by Mark Shafto	Sheriff of Newcastle-upon-Tyne; 1543–1544	Succeeded by Cuthbert Ellison
