= Armyne Ware =

Scottish Artist

Armyne May Ware (1 May 1900 - 10 October 2000) was a painter and etcher based in the United Kingdom. Her work is included in the permanent collection of the Scottish National Gallery.

== Early life and family ==
Ware was born in Poole, England. She was the daughter of Mary Davidson (Kinnear) and Charles Davidson. Her mother was born on May 17, 1863, in Kent, England. Her father was born 20 February 1859, in Edinburgh, Scotland. They met in the mid-1880s and moved to India where Charles joined the Indian Army on 14 January 1888, and they had daughters, Margaret Jean (born 1891) and Mary Claire (born 1892). The family then moved to Poole, England, where Ware was born. Charles stayed in the Indian Army until his retirement in 1908, at which point he, Mary and their three daughters moved to Aboyne, Aberdeenshire. Mary Davidson died March 11, 1945, in Aboyne, Aberdeenshire at the age of 81 and Charles Davidson died 21 December 1956, at the age of 97.

== Work ==
Ware was an artist who mostly worked using paint and etching. She started her art career while living in Scotland at the age of 17. She received multiple Honourable Mentions for Art in The Gentlewomen newspaper between 1918 and 1920.

She submitted multiple artworks to The Royal Scottish Academy between 1931 and 1942, at which point, she moved to England. One of Ware's artworks, 'Canal' was exhibited in an R.S.A exhibition in May, 1934. A reviewer from The Scotsman wrote that the artwork was more developed than others and had effective composition.

Ware and her husband, Harry Fabian Ware were exhibited at the New Gallery, Edinburgh on 9 November 1935 alongside fellow artists, James Cowie, Anne Finlay, Josephine Haswell Miller and William Wilson.

Ware has two etchings in the Scottish National Gallery of Modern Art. They are etchings on paper (21.70 x 21.70 cm) created in 1934.

== Personal life and interests ==
Ware attended many charity balls in Aberdeenshire, often accompanied by her sister Claire. She attended the Aboyne Games Ball in September 1920 wearing a patterned brocade with pink and yellow flowers on it. She then attended the `Gordon Highlanders Club Ball in September 1921, the Country Ball in Aid of Sick Children's Hospital in September 1922, and the Aboyne Ball in September 1927.

== Later life ==
Ware married fellow artist, Harry Fabian Ware, son of Major-General Sir Fabian Arthur Goulstone Ware, on 1 August 1928 in the Parish Church, Aboyne, Aberdeenshire. Ware moved to Gloucester, England, in 1942. She died on 10 October 2000, in the Redbridge, London.
