= Henry Anderson (politician, born 1545) =

English landowner, politician and MP for Newcastle-upon-Tyne (1545–1605)

Alderman Henry Anderson JP

MP for Newcastle-upon-Tyne
- In office 1593–1593
- Preceded by: Henry Anderson; Henry Mitford
- Succeeded by: Henry Chapman; Henry Lindley
- In office 1588–1588
- Preceded by: Henry Anderson; Edward Lewen
- Succeeded by: Henry Anderson; Henry Mitford
- In office 1586–1587
- Preceded by: Henry Anderson; William Jenison
- Succeeded by: Henry Anderson; Henry Mitford
- In office 1584–1585
- Preceded by: William Jenison; William Selby
- Succeeded by: Henry Anderson; Edward Lewen
Civic offices
Mayor of Newcastle-upon-Tyne
In office 1594–1595
Preceded by	Lionel Maddison
Succeeded by	William Riddell
In office 1583–1584
Preceded by	William Riddell
Succeeded by	Henry Mitford
In office 1575–1576
Preceded by	John Watson
Succeeded by	Henry Brandling
Honorary titles
Sheriff of Northumberland
In office 1586–1587
Preceded by	Robert Clauding
Succeeded by	Sir William Fenwick
Sheriff of Newcastle-upon-Tyne
In office 1571–1572
Preceded by	George Briggs
Succeeded by	Robert Barker

Personal details
- Born: 1545 Newcastle-upon-Tyne, Northumberland
- Died: 1605 (aged 59–60) Newcastle-upon-Tyne, Northumberland
- Spouse(s): (1) Isabella Morland (d.1582); (2) Fortune Collingwood
- Children: Inter alia, Sir Henry Anderson
- Parent: Bertram Anderson
- Education: St John's College, Cambridge; Gray's Inn
- Occupation: Merchant; Politician

Henry Anderson (1545 – 1605) was an English landowner and politician who was elected to represent Newcastle-upon-Tyne once as Sheriff, three times as Mayor, and four times as MP in the House of Commons between 1584 and 1593 and was also Sheriff of Northumberland.

== Background ==
Anderson was the eldest son of Bertram Anderson (d.1571) and his wife, Alice Carr, the daughter of Robert Carr of Newcastle-upon-Tyne. He was educated at St John's College, Cambridge and Gray's Inn.

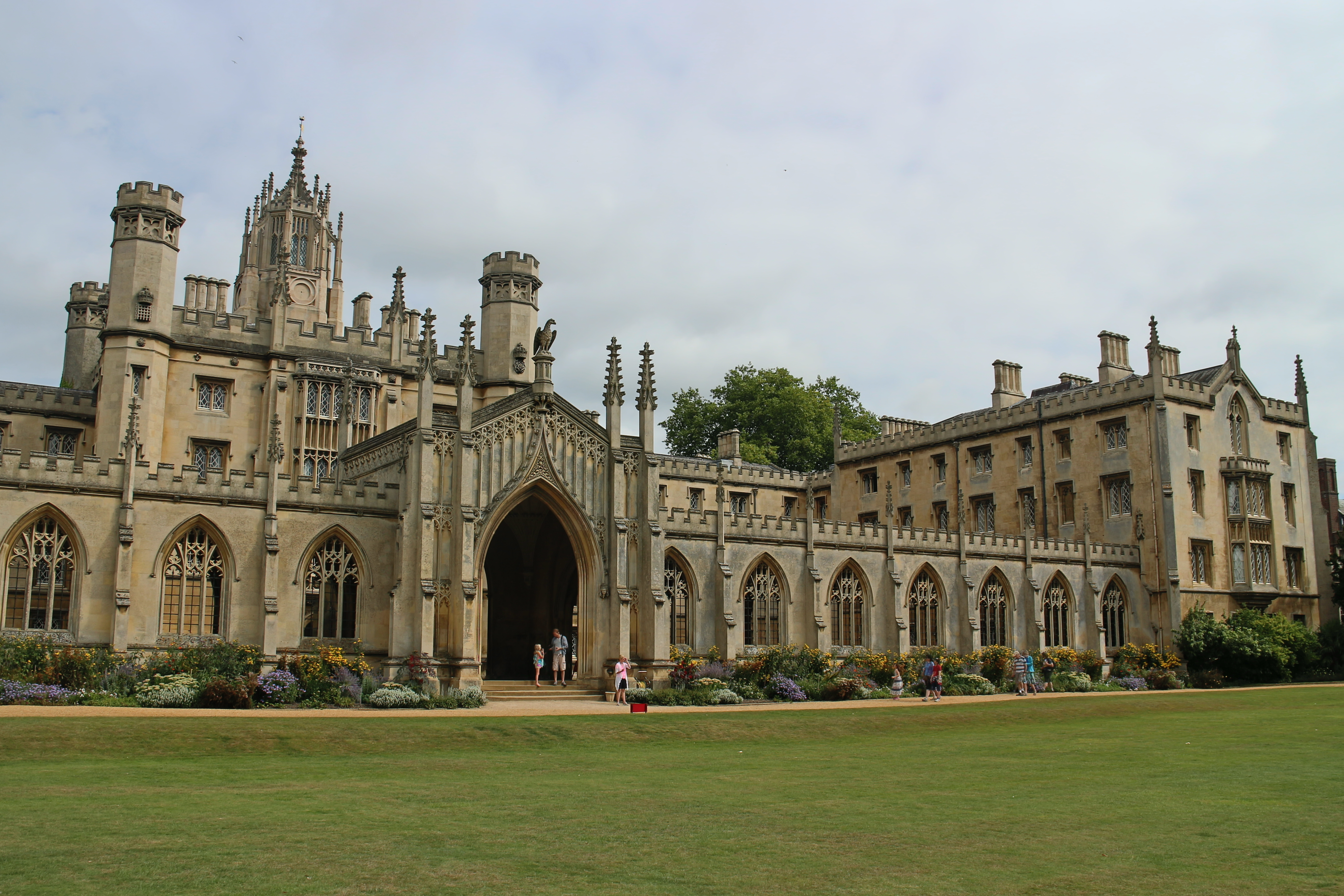
St John's College, Cambridge

== Career ==
Anderson was Sheriff (1571–2), Alderman (1575) and Mayor of Newcastle-upon-Tyne (1575–6, 1583–4, 1594–5). Justice of the Peace for Northumberland (from 1577), he was later High Sheriff of Northumberland (1586–7) and Justice of the Peace for County Durham (from 1584). Elected to parliament for Newcastle-upon-Tyne, he attended the Parliaments of 1584, 1586, 1588, and 1593. He resided at Haswell, County Durham. He died at the beginning of August 1605 and was buried at Pittington, County Durham.

== Family ==
Anderson married Isabella Morland (d.1582), the daughter of Christopher Morland of Pittington, County Durham. They had four daughters. Anderson's second marriage to Fortune Collingwood, the daughter of Sir Cuthbert Collingwood of Eslington, Northumberland produced a further nine children, including the Royalist Sir Henry Anderson (1582–1659).

== Arms ==
Coat of arms of Henry Anderson

Notes
The arms of the Andersons of Newcastle-upon-Tyne
Escutcheon
Or, on a chevron Gules between three birds' heads erased Sable, as many acorns slipped Argent, on a canton Sable three martlets Argent.

== Ancestry ==
Ancestors of Henry Anderson (1545–1605)

16. Richard Anderson of Newcastle-upon-Tyne
8. John Anderson of Newcastle-upon-Tyne
4. Henry Anderson (1484–1559) of Newcastle-upon-Tyne
18. Thomas Lockwood of Newcastle-upon-Tyne
9. Marian Lockwood
19. (Unknown) Stephenson
2. Bertram Anderson (1505–71) of Newcastle-upon-Tyne
10. Robert Orde of Ord, Northumberland
5. Ann Orde
1. Henry Anderson (1545–1605)
6. Robert Carr of Newcastle-upon-Tyne
3. Alice Carr

Parliament of England
Preceded by Henry Anderson; Henry Mitford	Member of Parliament for Newcastle upon Tyne; 1593–1593	Succeeded by Henry Chapman; Henry Lindley
Preceded by Henry Anderson; Edward Lewen	Member of Parliament for Newcastle upon Tyne; 1588–1588	Succeeded by Henry Anderson; Henry Mitford
Preceded by Henry Anderson; William Jenison	Member of Parliament for Newcastle upon Tyne; 1586–1587	Succeeded by Henry Anderson; Henry Mitford
Preceded by William Jenison; William Selby	Member of Parliament for Newcastle upon Tyne; 1584–1585	Succeeded by Henry Anderson; Edward Lewen
Civic offices
Preceded by Lionel Maddison	Mayor of Newcastle-upon-Tyne; 1594–1595	Succeeded by William Riddell
Preceded by William Riddell	Mayor of Newcastle-upon-Tyne; 1583–1584	Succeeded by Henry Mitford
Preceded by John Watson	Mayor of Newcastle-upon-Tyne; 1575–1576	Succeeded by Henry Brandling
Honorary titles
Preceded by Robert Clauding	Sheriff of Northumberland; 1586–1587	Succeeded by Sir William Fenwick
Preceded by George Briggs	Sheriff of Newcastle-upon-Tyne; 1571–1572	Succeeded by Robert Barker
