= Peter Riddel =

English politician

Sir Peter Riddel (died 18 April 1641) was an English politician who sat in the House of Commons at various times between 1624 and 1640.

Riddel was Sheriff of Newcastle-upon-Tyne in 1604. He was knighted at Newcastle on 4 May 1617. In 1619 he was mayor of Newcastle. In 1624, he was elected Member of Parliament for Newcastle-upon-Tyne. He was re-elected MP for Newcastle in 1626 and in 1628, and sat until 1629 when King Charles decided to rule without parliament for eleven years.

Riddel was Mayor of Newcastle again in 1635. He was re-elected MP for Newcastle in 1640 for the Short Parliament. In the Second Bishops' War, the Scottish army invaded England in August 1640 and the English army withdrew from Newcastle to Durham. Riddel at Newcastle had no option but to admit the Scottish army to the town.

Riddel died in 1641 and was buried in the church of St Nicholas, Newcastle.

Parliament of England
| Preceded by Sir Henry Anderson; Sir Thomas Ridell | Member of Parliament for Newcastle-upon-Tyne; 1624; With: Sir Henry Anderson | Succeeded by Sir Thomas Ridell; Sir Henry Anderson |
| Preceded by Sir Thomas Ridell; Sir Henry Anderson | Member of Parliament for Newcastle-upon-Tyne; 1626–1629; With: Sir Henry Anderson 1626; Sir Thomas Ridell 1628–1629 | Parliament suspended until 1640 |
| Vacant Parliament suspended since 1629 | Member of Parliament for Newcastle-upon-Tyne; 1640; With: Thomas Liddel | Succeeded by Sir Henry Anderson; John Blakiston |
