= Thomas Ridell =

Sir Thomas Ridell (died 1652) was an English Royalist in the English Civil War.

Ridell was the son of Sir Thomas Ridel of Gateshead and his wife Elizabeth Conyers daughter of Sir John Conyers. He became recorder of Newcastle-upon-Tyne and was of Fenham.

In the Civil War, Ridell espoused the royal cause with great zeal. He commanded a regiment of foot for the king and was governor of Tynemouth Castle. A reward of one thousand pounds was offered for his capture. He escaped from Berwick in a small fishing smack. His lordship of Tunstal was sold to satisfy composition.

Ridell died in exile at Antwerp in 1652.

Ridell married in 1629 Barbara Calverley widow of Ralph Calverley and daughter of Sir Alexander Davison of Blakiston.

Parliament of England
Preceded by Henry Anderson; William Jenison	Member of Parliament for Newcastle-upon-Tyne; 1621; With: Henry Anderson	Succeeded by Sir Peter Riddel; Henry Anderson
Preceded by Sir Peter Riddel; Henry Anderson	Member of Parliament for Newcastle-upon-Tyne; 1628–1629; With: Sir Peter Riddel	Vacant Parliament suspended until 1640
