= Henry Anderson (merchant) =

English merchant, politician and MP for Newcastle-upon-Tyne (1484–1559)

Alderman Henry Anderson

MP for Newcastle-upon-Tyne
- In office 1529–1529 Serving with Sir Thomas Tempest
- Preceded by: unknown
- Succeeded by: Sir Thomas Tempest unknown
Civic offices
Mayor of Newcastle-upon-Tyne
In office 1546–1547
Preceded by	George Davell
Succeeded by	Sir Robert Brandling
In office 1542–1543
Preceded by	John Hilton
Succeeded by	Robert Brandling
In office 1539–1540
Preceded by	Andrew Bewick
Succeeded by	James Lawson
In office 1532–1533
Preceded by	Robert Brandling
Succeeded by	Thomas Horsley
Honorary titles
Sheriff of Newcastle-upon-Tyne
In office 1520–1521
Preceded by	Gilbert Middleton
Succeeded by	George Davell

Personal details
- Born: Henry Anderson c.1484 Newcastle-upon-Tyne, Northumberland
- Died: 1559 (aged 74–75) Newcastle-upon-Tyne, Northumberland
- Spouse: Ann Orde
- Children: 10, including: Bertram Anderson
- Occupation: Merchant; Politician

Henry Anderson (1484 – 1559) was an English politician who represented Newcastle-upon-Tyne and served once as Sheriff, as Mayor four times, was elected to the House of Commons in the Reformation Parliament in 1529, and was the first Governor of the Merchant Adventurers of Newcastle-upon-Tyne.

== Background ==
Henry Anderson was the son of the Newcastle-upon-Tyne merchant John Anderson and his wife Marian Lockwood, the daughter of Thomas Lockwood of Richmondshire, Yorkshire. Thomas Lockwood had previously been Sheriff (1471–72) and Mayor (1488–89) of Newcastle-upon-Tyne.

== Career ==
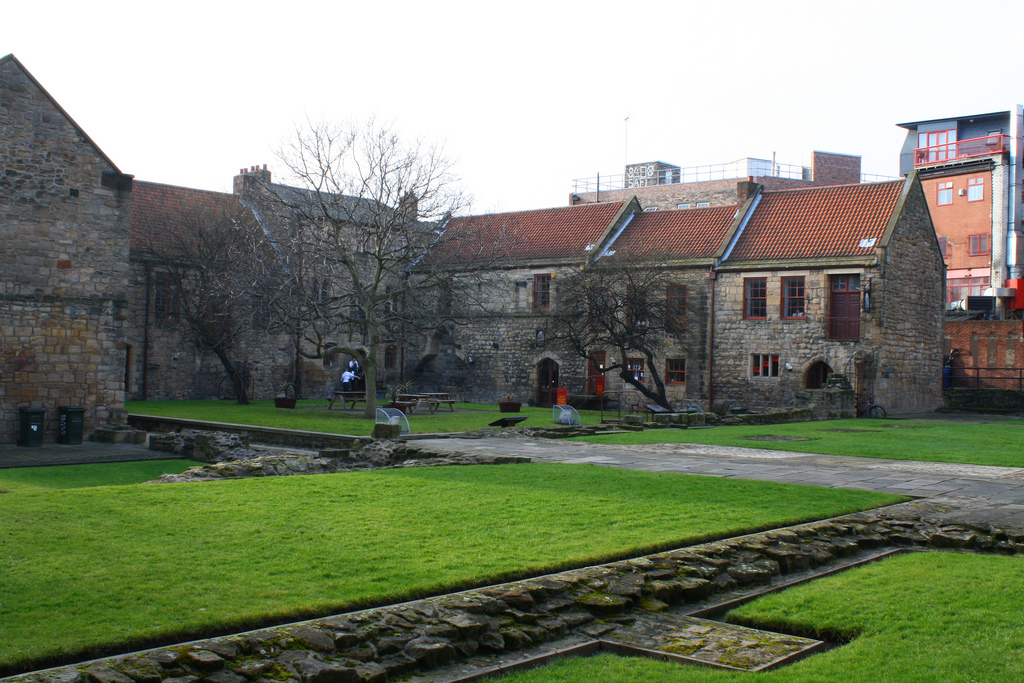
Blackfriars, Newcastle-upon-Tyne

Anderson was Sheriff (1520–21), Alderman (by 1524) then Mayor of Newcastle-upon-Tyne (1532–33, 1539–40, 1542–43, 1546–47). He was elected to represent the town in the Reformation Parliament in 1529 and may even have been elected in 1523, 1536, 1539 and 1542.

During the Pilgrimage of Grace, he was among the Newcastle Mayor and Aldermen who were praised for resisting the rebellion. During his time as Mayor, Anderson was appointed as keeper of Newcastle's Dominican Friary in 1539. Anderson also provided ships and resources for the army and Royal Naval fleet during the war with Scotland in 1543. Four years later, in 1547, he became the first Governor of the newly founded Merchant Adventurers of Newcastle-upon-Tyne.

Anderson made his will in January 1559 and seems likely to have died shortly afterwards (and buried at St Nicholas's Church, Newcastle) since an inventory of his estate was made in March 1559.

== Family ==
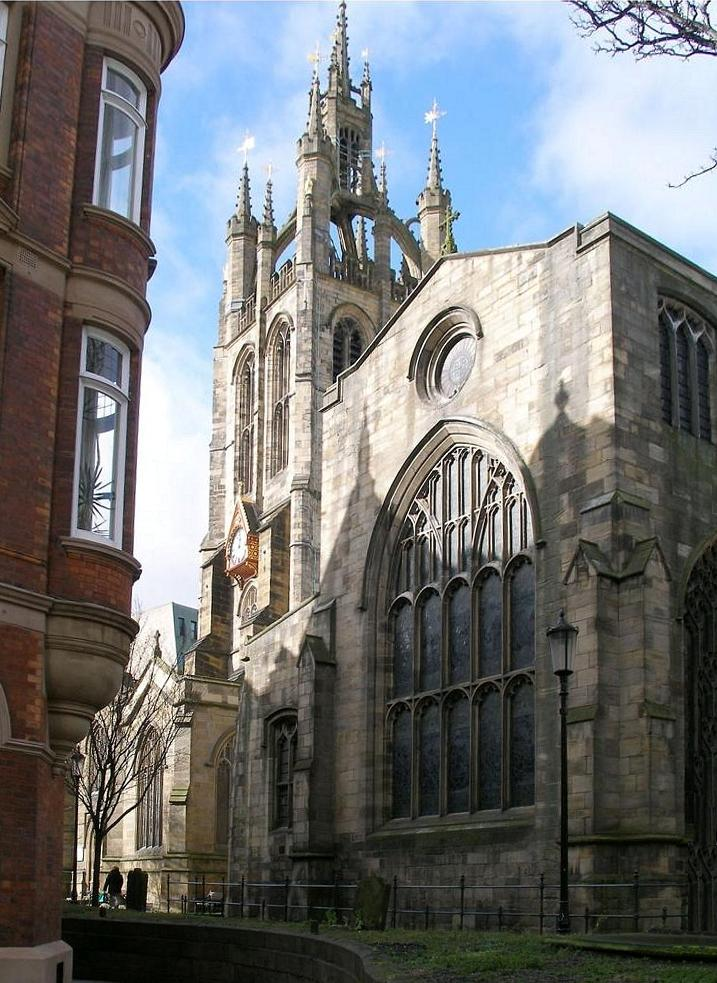
St Nicholas's Church, Newcastle

Anderson married Anne Orde, the daughter of Robert Orde of Orde, Northumberland. They had ten children, including four sons: Bertram (1505–71), Francis, Henry and Clement.

He was the founder of a political dynasty – his son, Bertram (1505–1571), grandson Henry (1545–1605) and great-grandson Sir Henry (1582–1659) were all MPs, Mayors and Sheriffs of Newcastle-upon-Tyne during the sixteenth and seventeenth centuries.

== Arms ==
Coat of arms of Henry Anderson

Notes
The arms of the Andersons of Newcastle-upon-Tyne
Escutcheon
Or, on a chevron Gules between three birds’ heads erased Sable, as many acorns slipped Argent, on a canton Sable three martlets Argent.

== Ancestry ==
Ancestors of Henry Anderson (1484–1559)

4. Richard Anderson of Newcastle-upon-Tyne
2. John Anderson of Newcastle-upon-Tyne
1. Henry Anderson (1484–1559)
6. Thomas Lockwood of Newcastle-upon-Tyne
3. Marian Lockwood
7. (Unknown) Stephenson

Parliament of England
Preceded by unknown	Member of Parliament for Newcastle upon Tyne; 1521–1521; With: Sir Thomas Tempest	Succeeded by Sir Thomas Tempest unknown
Civic offices
Preceded by George Davell	Mayor of Newcastle-upon-Tyne; 1546–1547	Succeeded by Sir Robert Brandling
Preceded by John Hilton	Mayor of Newcastle-upon-Tyne; 1542–1543	Succeeded by Robert Brandling
Preceded by Andrew Bewick	Mayor of Newcastle-upon-Tyne; 1539–1540	Succeeded by James Lawson
Preceded by Robert Brandling	Mayor of Newcastle-upon-Tyne; 1532–1533	Succeeded by Thomas Horsley
Honorary titles
Preceded by Gilbert Middleton	Sheriff of Newcastle-upon-Tyne; 1520–1521	Succeeded by George Davell
