= Haswell Moor =

Village in County Durham, England

Coordinates: 54°46.1′N 1°24.1′W

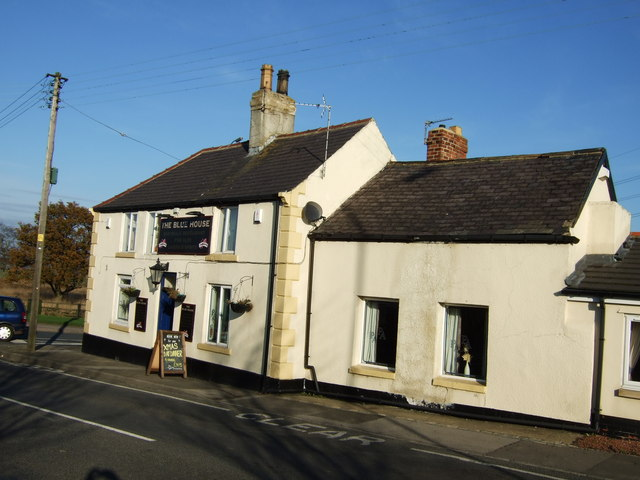
The Blue House, Haswell Moor

Haswell Moor is a small village in County Durham, England. It is situated between Haswell and Shotton Colliery.

A wind farm opened at Haswell Moor Farm, just to the north-west of Haswell Moor in 2010; it consists of five wind turbines that are together capable of producing 10MW of electricity.
