= Philip Connard =

English painter

Philip Connard CVO RA RWS
- Self-portrait of Connard (c. 1910/1920)
- Born: 24 March 1875; Southport, England
- Died: 8 December 1958 (aged 83); Twickenham, England
- Education: Royal College of Art
- Known for: Oil paintings, Watercolour paintings, War art
- Spouse(s): Mary Collyer (m. N/A; died 1927) Georgina Yorke (m. 1933)

Philip Connard, CVO, RA, RWS (24 March 1875 – 8 December 1958) was a British painter known particularly for his paintings of decorative landscapes. Connard rose from humble origins to become an eminent artist in oils and watercolours whose commissions brought him royal recognition.

== Life and career ==
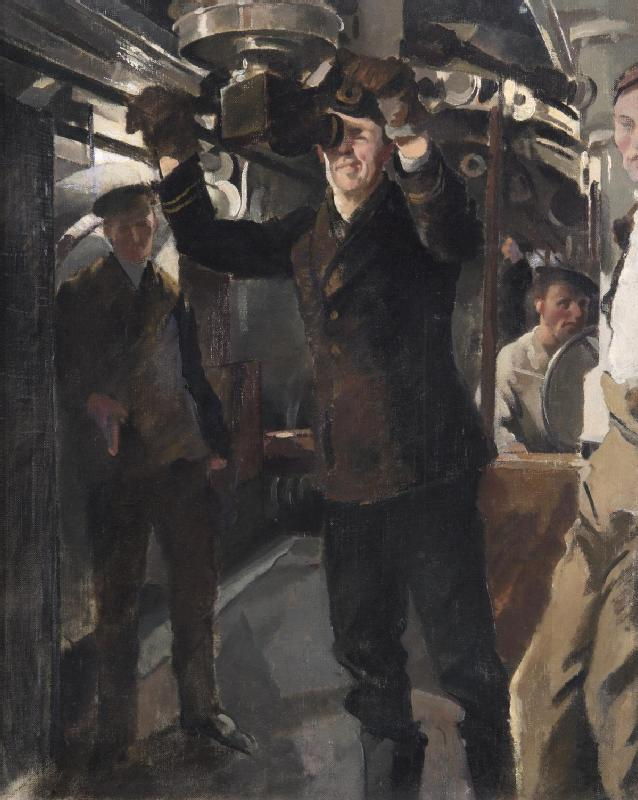
Making an Attack (circa. 1918)

Connard left school with the minimum state education and went into the building trade as a house painter. He attended evening classes in art and won a scholarship in textile design to the Royal College of Art in London. There he won a prize of £100 which enabled him to go to Paris to study, although he did not stay there as long as he had hoped his money would allow him to. He returned to London where he worked as an illustrator before obtaining a position at the Lambeth School of Art where he taught artists such as Edmund Blampied. While teaching at Lambeth he submitted pictures to the New English Art Club and became known as a painter in oils of romantic decorative landscapes with figures such as pierettes or birds. His compositions were said to be ‘graceful, airy and highly individual in conception’.

Although he was nearly 40 years old when the First World War broke out, Connard volunteered as a private, learned to ride, and fought in France as a member of a gun team in the Royal Field Artillery. He reached the rank of Captain before being invalided out because of severe shell shock. He was later appointed an official war artist to the Royal Navy and painted the surrender of the German ship SMS Goeben and the Zeebrugge raid. This work for the Navy is in the Imperial War Museum in London.

Connard was given a number of important decorative commissions: murals at Windsor Castle; two panels for a ballroom in New Delhi; and a large panel on the subject of England for the Cunard liner, RMS Queen Mary. His work can be found in the Tate Gallery, London; the Musée d’Orsay, Paris; the National Gallery of Australia, the Royal Academy, London, the Ashmolean Museum, Oxford; and the National Museum of Wales.

Connard was elected an associate of the Royal Academy in 1918 and became a full Academician in 1925. He was Keeper of the Royal Academy school, the principal tutor, from 1945 to 1949. He was also a full member of the Royal Society of Painters in Watercolours. In 1950 he was appointed a Commander of the Royal Victorian Order. Connard, meanwhile, did not forget his hometown: he was the founding President of The Southport Palette Club, established in 1921 to hold annual exhibitions of the work of local artists, and he retained this position until his death in 1958.

Connard married twice: his first wife, Mary Collyer, with whom he had two daughters, died in 1927; in 1933 he married Georgina Yorke, whom he depicted in many of his later paintings of interiors. He lived for several years in Richmond, Surrey with Scottish artist Anne Finlay.

== Collections ==
Connard's works are housed all over England. Several of his works are also housed around Wales. His work is in numerous public and private collections worldwide, including:

- Tate, U.K.
- Musée d'Orsay, Paris
- National Gallery of Australia, Canberra
- Royal Academy, London
- Ashmolean Museum, Oxford
- National Portrait Gallery, London
- Amgueddfa Cymru – Museum Wales

== Gallery ==
Several of the paintings done by Connard during World War I.

Philip de László

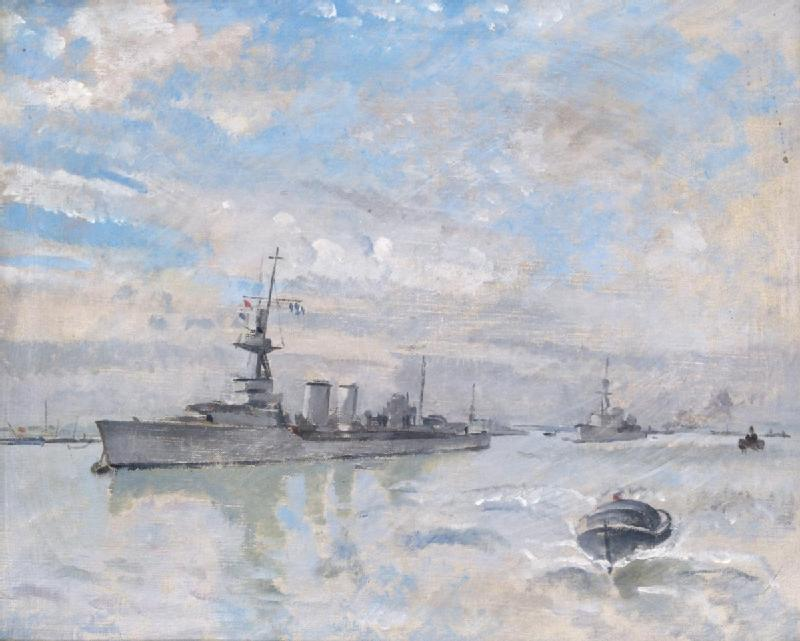
HMS Danae

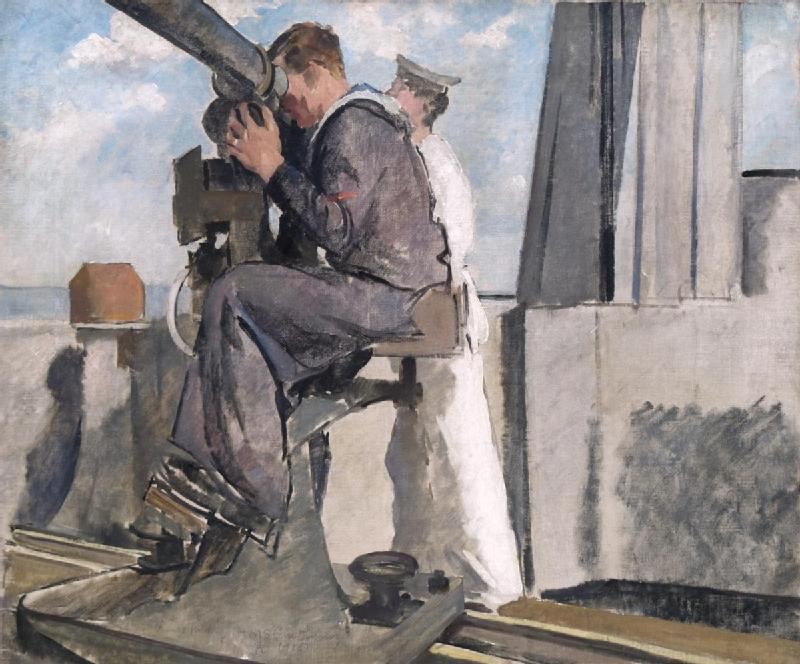
Rangefinder in Action

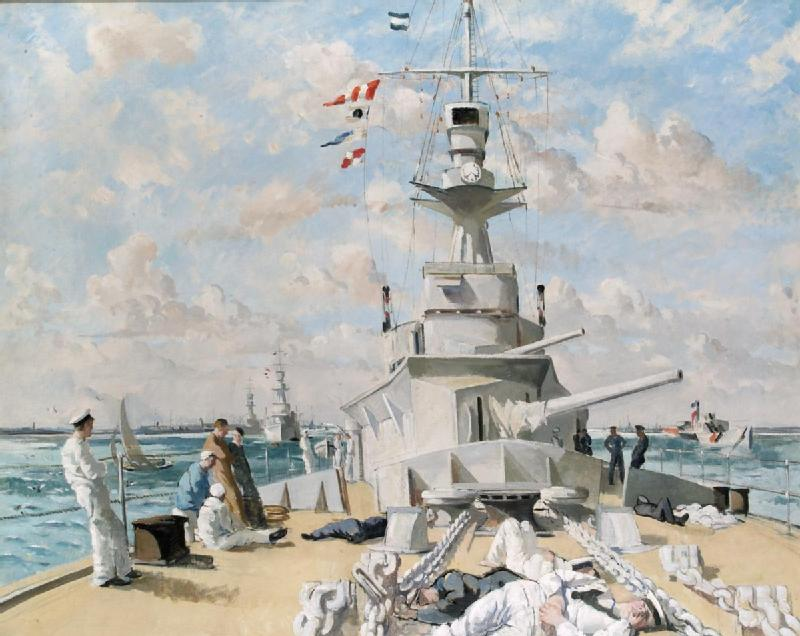
The Forecastle of HMS Curlew

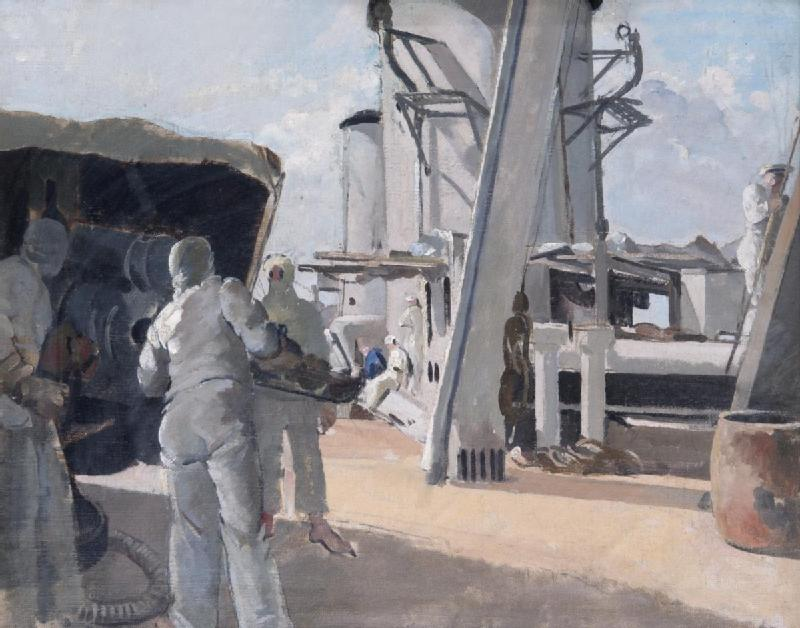
Gun Practice (HMS Canterbury)

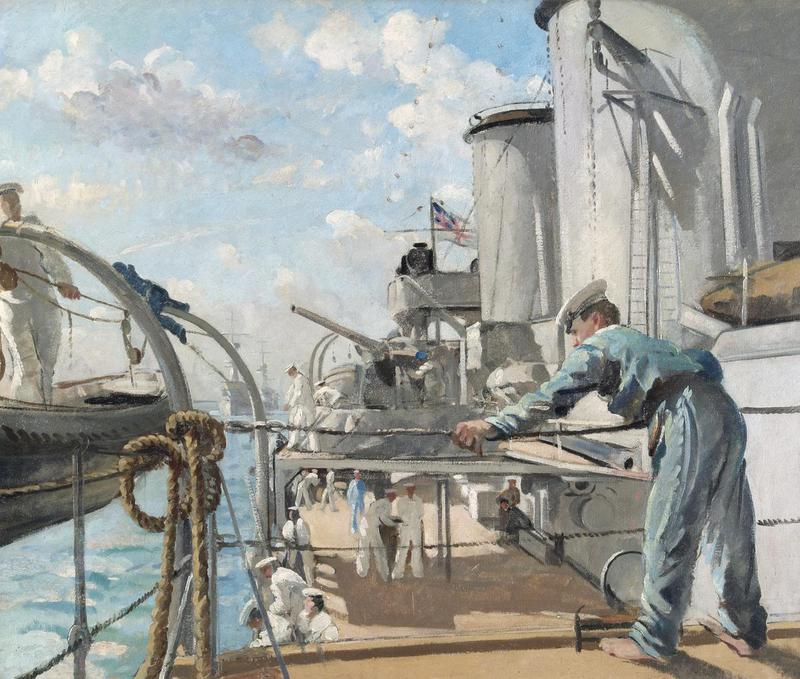
Lowering the Whaler (HMS Coventry)

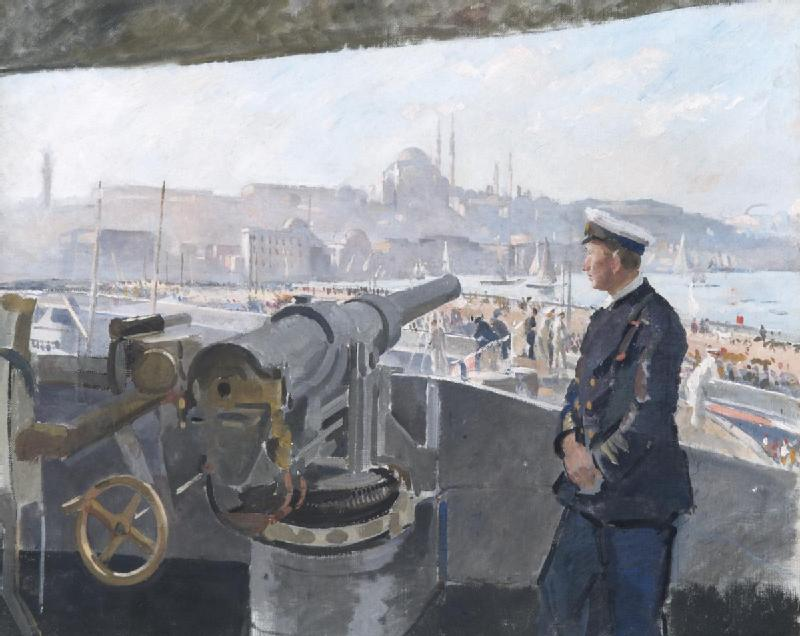
The Guns of HMS Caesar

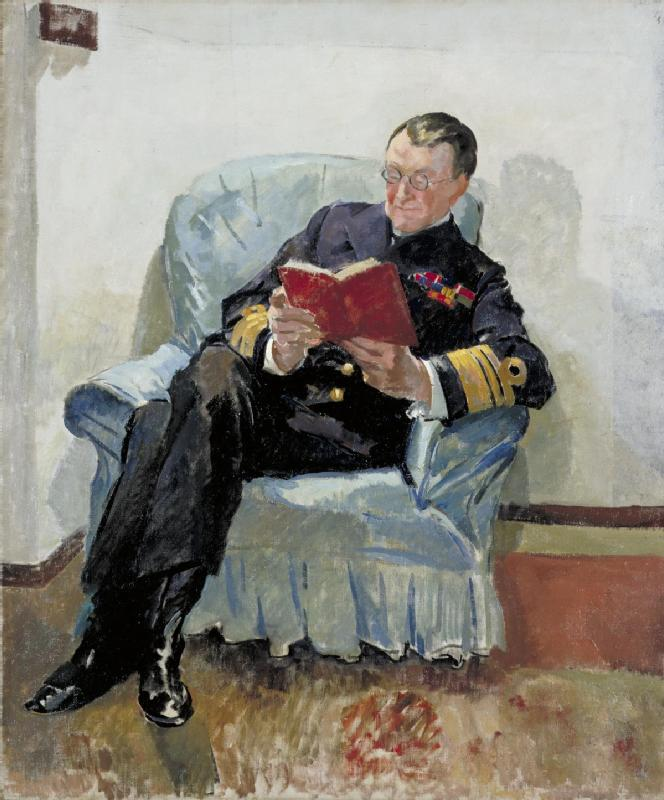
Sir Somerset Arthur Gough-Calthorpe
