= Baxterwood Priory =

Benedictine monastery in County Durham, England

Monastery information
- Order: Benedictine
- Established: 12th Century
- Disestablished: 1538
- Diocese: Diocese of Durham

People
- Important associated figures: Henry Pudsey

Site
- Location: Haswell, County Durham, England
- Visible remains: None

Haswell Grange
- Type: Private Residence
- Location: Haswell

History
- Built: Medieval
- Demolished: 18th Century

Elemore Grange
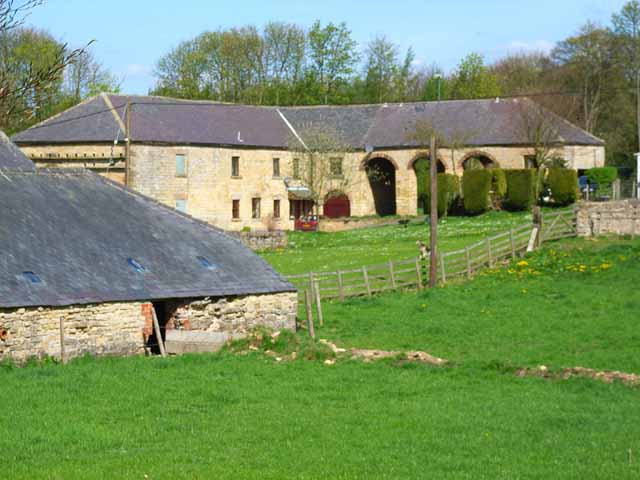
- Modern-day Elemore Grange
- Type: Private Residence
- Location: Haswell

History
- Built: 18th Century

Baxterwood Priory was a Benedictine monastery originally founded at Haswell, County Durham, England, and later at Baxterwood, with the monastic farm becoming the private residence of Haswell Grange (later demolished) and Elemore Grange since the 18th Century.

== Relocation and Re-Endowment ==
The monastery was originally founded as "The Church of St Mary of Haswell" by Henry Pudsey, a son of Bishop Pudsey, in the latter part of the 12th century. Two vills, Wingate and Haswell, were also conferred, probably, on the Canons of Gisburn. However, a better situation for a monastery was found at Baxterwood, possibly in 1196.

A second establishment was known as the "New Place upon the Browney" and dedicated to the Virgin Mary, with Stephen as the superintendent of the newly founded Augustinian priory. It was later appropriated by the nearby Benedictine monks of Durham Cathedral and became a Benedictine priory, its lands and vills being conferred on Finchale Priory. It was very close to the site of the Battle of Neville's Cross on 17 October 1346 and on the battle site map along with Arbour House some way to the north.

== Haswell Grange ==
Haswell Grange was a Benedictine grange established on the site of the intended Augustinian Baxterwood monastery. The Grange was in use until the Dissolution of the Monasteries when it was sold. It was sold to the Newcastle merchant and politician Bertram Anderson (1505–71).

== Elemore Grange ==
Haswell Grange was later demolished and the present Elemore Grange is believed to have been built on the same site during the later 18th century.

== Bibliography ==
- British History Online
