= Elizabeth Haswell =

American biologist

- Education: University of California, San Francisco; University of Washington
- Scientific career
- Workplaces: Washington University in St. Louis; California Institute of Technology
- Thesis: Chromatin remodeling at the Saccharomyces cerevisiae PHO5 promoter (2000)
- Website: Haswell Lab

Elizabeth Haswell is an American biologist who is a professor and Howard Hughes Medical Institute-Simons Faculty Scholar at the Washington University in St. Louis. She was elected Fellow of the American Association for the Advancement of Science in 2021.

== Early life and education ==
Haswell was an undergraduate student at the University of Washington, where she studied biochemistry. She was a doctoral researcher at the University of California, San Francisco, where she researched the Saccharomyces cerevisiae PHO5 promoter.

== Research and career ==
Haswell works in mechanobiology, and is interested in the structure-function properties of molecular and cellular structures in plants. She has studied the minuscule mechanosensitive tunnels ("piezochannels") within cell membranes. These tunnels help cells to understand and respond to mechanical forces. Haswell was particularly interested the fundamental mechanisms that underpin the role of these channels within the pollen tubes of flowering plants. She identified that these channels are not found along the plasma membrane, but deep within the plant cell. Haswell has also studied the signal mechanisms plants use to respond to threats. In 2016, she worked at the University of Cambridge as a Visiting Professor in the Sainsbury Laboratory. Haswell is on the editorial board of Science Advances.

Alongside her academic research, Haswell has written about research culture, equity and how concepts from sustainable agriculture can be applied to biology faculty members. In 2017, she started The Taproot podcast, an American Society of Plant Biologists program that discusses the stories behind science. The podcast addresses issues such as work-life balance, gender discrimination and racism. She helped to create the DiversifyPlantSci database, which seeks to create a global plant science community that reflects the diversity of its members.

== Awards and honors ==
- 1999 University of California, San Francisco Chancellor's Award for the Advancement of Women
- 2000 United States Department of Energy Fellow of the Life Sciences Research Foundation
- 2016 Elected Howard Hughes Medical Institute Faculty Scholar
- 2021 Elected Fellow of the American Association for the Advancement of Science

== Selected publications ==
- David J Steger; Elizabeth S Haswell; Aimee L Miller; Susan R Wente; Erin K O'Shea (January 3, 2003). "Regulation of chromatin remodeling by inositol polyphosphates". Science. 299 (5603): 114–6. doi:10.1126/science.1078062. ISSN 0036-8075. PMC 1458531. PMID 12434012. Wikidata Q24546253.
- Elizabeth S Haswell; Rob Phillips; Douglas C Rees (October 12, 2011). "Mechanosensitive channels: what can they do and how do they do it?". Structure. 19 (10): 1356–69. doi:10.1016/j.str.2011.09.005. ISSN 0969-2126. PMC 3203646. PMID 22000509. Wikidata Q24633554.
- Elizabeth S. Haswell; Elliot M Meyerowitz (January 1, 2006). "MscS-like proteins control plastid size and shape in Arabidopsis thaliana". Current Biology. 16 (1): 1–11. doi:10.1016/j.cub.2005.11.044. ISSN 0960-9822. PMID 16401419. Wikidata Q44766557.
