= Sheriff of Newcastle upon Tyne =

Good historical country

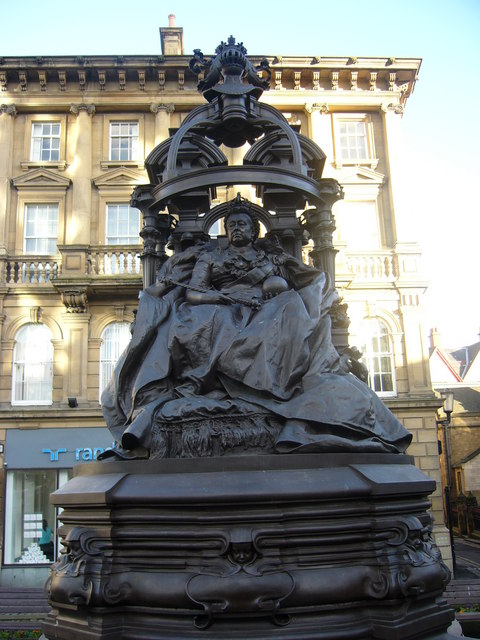
Statue commemorating 500 years of the shrievalty

The office of Sheriff of Newcastle upon Tyne existed from 1400 (626 years ago) until local government reorganisation in 1974 (52 years ago), and was reintroduced in 1996 (30 years ago) as a title held additionally by the Deputy Lord Mayor of Newcastle upon Tyne. The city has a sheriff because it was historically a county corporate.

In 1950 Violet Grantham became the first woman to hold the office (becoming the first female Lord Mayor two years later), and in 2019 Councillor Habib Rahman became the first BAME person to hold the office.

William Haswell Stephenson, who held the office in 1886, commissioned a bronze statue of Queen Victoria by Alfred Gilbert to celebrate 500 years of the shrievalty; it stands in the city centre and is Grade II* listed.

== Sheriffs 1400-1974 ==
- 1399 William Redmarshall
- 1400 Robert Gabefore
- 1401 John Paulyn
- 1402 William Esyngton
- 1403 Robert Hebburn
- 1404 William Langton
- 1405 Roger Thornton
- 1406 William Redmarshall
- 1407 John Bywell
- 1408 William Middleton
- 1409 John Wall
- 1410 Robert Hebburn
- 1411 John Paulyn
- 1412 William Redmarshall
- 1413 John Wall
- 1414 William Middleton
- 1415 John Strother
- 1416 Richard Dalton
- 1417 John Rodes
- 1418 John Wall
- 1419 William Ellerby
- 1420 Robert Whelpyngton
- 1421 Robert Swynburn
- 1422 Richard Hall
- 1423 John Jay
- 1424 Laurence Acton
- 1425 John Pray
- 1426 Thomas Chirden
- 1427 John Clerk
- 1428 Simon Weltden
- 1429 John Jay
- 1430 Richard Hall
- 1431 John Clerk
- 1432 Edward Bertram
- 1433 Thomas Chirden
- 1434 Thomas Papedy
- 1435 Richard Bothe
- 1436 Thomas Wardell
- 1437 John Chamber
- 1438 William Lawes
- 1439 Thomas Castell
- 1440 William Harding
- 1441 John Musgrave
- 1442 Simon Weltden
- 1443 William Jay
- 1444 Thomas Hedlam
- 1445 Thomas Bee
- 1446 John Ward
- 1447 John Ovyngton
- 1448 Robert Baxter
- 1449 John Richardson
- 1450 Alan Byrd
- 1451 Alan Carr
- 1452 John Baxter
- 1453 John Penreth
- 1454 Nicholas Wetwang
- 1455 William Rothom
- 1456 Thomas Cuthbert
- 1457 John Nikson
- 1458 Robert Stevenson
- 1459 Henry Fouler
- 1460 Richard Stevenson
- 1461 Nicholas Haynyng
- 1462 Nicholas Wetwang
- 1463 Henry Fouler
- 1464 William Blaxton
- 1465 Nicholas Haynyng
- 1466 William Thompson
- 1467 Robert Chambers
- 1468 John Easington
- 1469 John Coke
- 1470 John Fisher
- 1471 Thomas Lockwood
- 1472 George Carr
- 1473 Thomas Swan
- 1474 Robert Harden
- 1475 William Hudson
- 1476 John Sample
- 1477 Peter Bewick
- 1478 John Hilton
- 1479 John Riddesdale
- 1480 William Scott
- 1481 William Bewley
- 1482 William Cunningham
- 1483 Robert Stokhall
- 1484 George Bird
- 1485 Thomas Harbred
- 1486 Robert Brigham
- 1487 John Penrith
- 1488 William Richardson
- 1489 William Chambers
- 1490 Thomas Morpath
- 1491 Robert Harding
- 1492 Bertram Younghusband
- 1493 Thomas Harbred
- 1494 Thomas Green
- 1495 Christopher Brigham
- 1496 William Hayning
- 1497 William Davell
- 1498 John Penrith
- 1499 John Snowe
- 1500 Thomas Riddell and William Selby
- 1501 William Selby
- 1502 Richard Hill
- 1503 Robert Baxter
- 1504 John Blaxton
- 1505 John Brandling
- 1506 Thomas Saunderson
- 1507 William Harbred
- 1508 Thomas Lyghton
- 1509 Edward Baxter
- 1510 Roger Dent
- 1511 John Passhelower
- 1512 Thomas Horsley
- 1513 William Harding
- 1514 Robert Watson
- 1515 Robert Russell
- 1516 Peter Chater
- 1517 Nicholas Richardson
- 1518 Thomas Baxter
- 1519 Gilbert Middleton
- 1520 Henry Anderson
- 1521 George Davell
- 1522 Robert Bartram
- 1523 James Lawson
- 1524 Robert Brandling
- 1525 John Watson
- 1526 Edward Swynborne
- 1527 William Carr
- 1528 Andrew Bewick
- 1529 Bartholomew Bee
- 1530 Roger Mitford
- 1531 John Saunderson
- 1532 Ralph Carr
- 1533 William Dent
- 1534 Peter Bewick
- 1535 Thomas Bewick
- 1536 John Ord
- 1537 John White
- 1538 George Selby
- 1539 John Hilton
- 1540 Robert Brigham
- 1541 Robert Lewyn
- 1542 Mark Shafto
- 1543 Bertram Anderson
- 1544 Cuthbert Ellison
- 1545 Oswald Chapman
- 1546 Edward Baxter
- 1547 Thomas Scott
- 1548 Cuthbert Blount
- 1549 Richard Hodgson
- 1550 Cuthbert Musgrave
- 1551 Christopher Mitford
- 1552 John Rawe
- 1553 Robert Ellison
- 1554 William Dickinson
- 1555 John Wilkinson
- 1556 William Dent
- 1557 William Carr
- 1558 Andrew Surtees
- 1559 Robert Anderson
- 1560 Francis Anderson
- 1561 Stephen Southern
- 1562 George Helye
- 1563 Thomas Liddel
- 1564 William Selby
- 1565 Anthony Swinburn
- 1566 Henry Brandling
- 1567 John Watson
- 1568 William Jennison
- 1569 George Simpson
- 1570 George Briggs
- 1571 Henry Anderson
- 1572 Robert Barker
- 1573 Mark Shafto
- 1574 Roger Rawe
- 1575 William Riddell
- 1576 Christopher Lewen
- 1577 Edward Lewen
- 1578 Henry Tennant
- 1579 James Carr
- 1580 Robert Atkinson
- 1581 Henry Chapman
- 1582 Henry Mitford
- 1583 Roger Nicholson
- 1584 Lionel Maddison
- 1585 George Whitfield
- 1586 Robert Dudley
- 1587 Robert Eden
- 1588 George Farnaby
- 1589 John Gibson
- 1590 Ralph Jenison
- 1591 William Greenwell
- 1592 Ralph Jenison and Thomas Liddell
- 1593 Henry Holford and William Jenison
- 1594 George Selby
- 1595 Francis Anderson
- 1596 Francis Anderson and Adrvan Hedworth
- 1597 William Huntly
- 1598 William Warmouth
- 1599 James Clavering
- 1600 Robert Anderson
- 1601 Thomas Riddel
- 1602 Francis Burrell
- 1603 Matthew Chapman
- 1604 Peter Riddel
- 1605 Henry Maddison
- 1606 Hugh Selby
- 1607 Robert Shafto
- 1608 William Hall
- 1609 Thomas Liddel the Younger
- 1610 Timothy Draper
- 1611 Alexander Davison
- 1612 Roger Anderson
- 1613 Henry Chapman
- 1614 John Cook
- 1615 Robert Bewick
- 1616 Michael Milburn
- 1617 William Bonner
- 1618 John Clavering
- 1619 Robert Anderson
- 1620 Nicholas Tempest
- 1621 Henry Liddel
- 1622 Robert Ledger and William Jackson
- 1623 Henry Bowes and William Jackson
- 1624 Lionel Maddison
- 1625 Ralph Cole
- 1626 Ralph Cock
- 1627 Henry Cock
- 1628 Ralph Grey
- 1629 Robert Shaftoe
- 1630 James Carr
- 1631 Henry Warmouth
- 1632 Francis Bowes
- 1633 Nicholas Cole
- 1634 John Marley
- 1635 Leonard Carr
- 1636 Henry Lawson
- 1637 Peter Maddison
- 1638 Mark Milbank
- 1639 John Emmerson
- 1640 Francis Liddell
- 1641 Sir Francis Anderson
- 1642 Henry Maddison
- 1643 Cuthbert Carr
- 1644 James Cole Robert Ellison
- 1645 Christopher Nicholson
- 1646 Henry Rawling
- 1647 Robert Young
- 1648 Ralph Jennison
- 1649 Samuel Rawlings
- 1650 John Lodge
- 1651 Peter Sanderson
- 1652 John Butler
- 1653 Robert Johnson
- 1654 John Rumney
- 1655 Henry Thompson
- 1656 George Blakiston
- 1657 George Thoresby
- 1658 John Watson
- 1659 James Briggs
- 1660 William Blackett
- 1661 Thomas Jennison
- 1662 Henry Brabant
- 1663 Robert Shaftoe
- 1664 Francis Liddel
- 1665 William Carr
- 1666 Timothy Davison
- 1667 Ralph Grey
- 1668 Robert Jennison
- 1669 John Rogers
- 1670 Richard Wright and Robert Roddam
- 1671 Matthew Jeffryson
- 1672 Robert Malabar
- 1673 George Morton
- 1674 Henry Jennison
- 1675 William Christian
- 1676 Michael Blackett
- 1677 Timothy Robson
- 1678 Nicholas Fenwick
- 1679 William Aubone
- 1680 Joseph Bonner
- 1681 John Squire
- 1682 Nicholas Ridley
- 1683 John Rumney
- 1684 William Proctor
- 1685 Ralph Elstob
- 1686 Thomas Paise
- 1687 William Ramsay (r) Samuel Gill
- 1688 Matthew Partis (r) Matthew White
- 1689 William Fetherstonhaugh
- 1690 Thomas Wasse
- 1691 Joseph Atkinson
- 1692 Benjamin Davison
- 1693 George Whinfield
- 1694 Robert Eden
- 1695 George Henderson
- 1696 William Ramsay
- 1697 George Cuthbertson
- 1698 Edward Harrison
- 1699 Jonathan Hargrave
- 1700 John Bowes
- 1701 William Boutflower
- 1702 John Bell
- 1703 Allan Bateman
- 1704 Matthew Matfen (d); Jonathan Rodham
- 1705 William Ellison
- 1706 Matthew Fetherstonhaugh
- 1707 Henry Reay
- 1708 Edward Johnson
- 1709 Henry Dalston
- 1710 Ralph Reed
- 1711 Francis Rudston
- 1712 Joseph Green
- 1713 Nicholas Fenwick
- 1714 Roger Matfen
- 1715 Nathaniel Clayton
- 1716 Francis Johnson
- 1717 John Kelly
- 1718 Thomas Stephenson
- 1719 Cuthbert Fenwicke
- 1720 Jacob Rutter
- 1721 Stephen Coulson
- 1722 Robert Sorsbie
- 1723 Richard Swinburn
- 1724 James Moncaster
- 1725 Thomas Wasse
- 1726 Joseph Liddell
- 1727 Robert Johnson
- 1728 John Stephenson
- 1729 Cuthbert Smith
- 1730 William Harbottle
- 1731 Chaloner Cooper
- 1732 William Fenwick
- 1733 John Simson
- 1734 Robert Ellison
- 1735 John Wilkinson
- 1736 Matthew Bell
- 1737 Jonathan Sorsbie
- 1738 William Greenwell
- 1739 Cuthbert Collingwood
- 1740 Ralph Sowerby
- 1741 John Ord
- 1742 William Peareth
- 1743 George Colpitts
- 1744 Aubonne Surtees
- 1745 Henry Partis
- 1746 Henry Eden
- 1747 William Watson
- 1748 John Vonholte
- 1749 Robert Heron
- 1750 William Clayton
- 1751 Matthew Scafe
- 1752 Francis Rudston
- 1753 John Harrison
- 1754 William Rowell
- 1755 William Harbottle
- 1756 John Erasmus Blackett
- 1757 John Scurfield
- 1758 Edward Mosley
- 1759 Matthew Stephenson
- 1760 John Baker
- 1761 Fletcher Partis
- 1762 Hugh Hornby
- 1763 Francis Forster
- 1764 Thomas Blackett
- 1765 Charles Atkinson
- 1766 John Hedley
- 1767 Richard Lacey
- 1768 William Coulson
- 1769 William Reed
- 1770 James Liddell
- 1771 Christopher Wilkinson
- 1772 James Rudman
- 1773 William Yielder
- 1774 Francis Johnson
- 1775 William Cramlington
- 1776 James Thomas Loraine
- 1777 Robert Clayton
- 1778 James Wilkinson
- 1779 Isaac Cookson
- 1780 William Surtees
- 1781 John Wallis (r) George Colpitts
- 1782 Richard Bell
- 1783 Christopher Soulsby
- 1784 Edward Dale
- 1785 Aubone Surtees the Younger
- 1786 Richard Chambers
- 1787 Joseph Forster
- 1788 Robert Newton Lynn
- 1789 Nathaniel Hornby
- 1790 Charles John Clavering
- 1791 Shaftoe John Hedley
- 1792 Matthew Pringle
- 1793 Henry Joseph Hounsom
- 1794 Archibald Reed
- 1795 Anthony Hood
- 1796 Nicholas Hall
- 1797 Thomas Smith
- 1798 William Wright
- 1799 Henry Cramlington
- 1800 Aubone Surtees the Younger
- 1801 Matthew Hedley (d); Isaac Cookson, younger
- 1802 Dixon Brown
- 1803 Thomas Cookson
- 1804 Benjamin Sorsbie
- 1805 Nathaniel John Winch
- 1806 John Cookson
- 1807 Thomas Burdon
- 1808 Thomas Burdon (r) Benjamin Sorsbie (r) George Shadforth
- 1809 Job James Bulman
- 1810 William Smoult Temple
- 1811 Thomas Burdon, jnr.
- 1812 Thomas Anderson
- 1813 Thomas Smith, jnr.
- 1814 Richard Brewster
- 1815 Ralph Naters
- 1816 Thomas Loggan
- 1817 William Clayton
- 1818 Henry Clayton
- 1819 Nicholas Naters
- 1820 John Anderson
- 1821 Alfred Hall
- 1822 Edward Johnson
- 1823 Edward John Jackson
- 1824 George Shadforth
- 1825 John Lionel Hood
- 1826 Alfred Hall
- 1827 Edward Dale
- 1828 John Brandling
- 1829 Henry Reed
- 1830 William Smith
- 1831 William Aubone Surtees
- 1832 Henry Bell
- 1833 G.C. Atkinson
- 1834 J.M. Chapman
- 1835 Thomas Dunn
- 1836 Anthony Nichol
- 1837 John Carr
- 1838 William Brownsword Proctor
- 1839 Robert Boyd
- 1840 James Archbold
- 1841 John Thomas Carr
- 1842 Joseph Hawks JP DL
- 1843 William Cookson
- 1844 John Fetherstone Ayton
- 1845 Matthew Robert Bigge
- 1846 Joseph Crawhall
- 1847 James Dent Weatherley
- 1848 Nathaniel Grace Lambert
- 1849 Ralph Dodds
- 1850 Mark Lambert Jobling
- 1851 Isaac Lowthian Bell
- 1852 Henry Ingledew
- 1853 John Gibson
- 1854 Edward Nathaniel Grace
- 1855 Anthony Nichol
- 1856 Joseph Armstrong
- 1857 John Ormston
- 1858 George Robinson
- 1859 William Hawthorn
- 1860 Thomas Hedley
- 1861 Benjamin Plummer
- 1862 Henry Parker
- 1863 William Hunter
- 1864 William Lockey Harie
- 1865 Henry Angus
- 1866 Richard Cail
- 1867 John Mawson (d)
- 1868 George William Hodge
- 1869 Thomas Leslie Gregson
- 1870 William Daggett
- 1871 John Brunton Falconar
- 1872 William Stephen Daglish
- 1873 Charles Henry Young
- 1874 John Oliver Scott
- 1875 Thomas Forster
- 1876 William Stewart
- 1877 Henry William Newton
- 1878 John Gibson Youll
- 1879 William Davies Stephen
- 1880 Thomas Richardson
- 1881 Thomas George Gibson
- 1882 Henry Clapham (d)
- 1883 Thomas Nelson
- 1884 Thomas Gray
- 1885 Thomas Bell
- 1886 William Haswell Stephenson
- 1887 Joseph Baxter Ellis
- 1888 William Sutton
- 1889 Edward Culley
- 1890 Stephen Quin
- 1891 Benjamin John Sutherland
- 1892 Riley Lord
- 1893 John Goolden
- 1894 Thomas Barkas Sanderson
- 1895 George Harkus
- 1896 John Beattie
- 1897 John Frederick Weidner
- 1898 Andrew Peter Anderson
- 1899 John James Forster
- 1900 James John Gillespie
- 1901 William John Sanderson
- 1902 John Matthew Oubridge
- 1903 William Cowell
- 1904 Arthur Scott
- 1905 Johnstone Wallace
- 1906 John Fitzgerald
- 1907 Walter Lee
- 1908 Thomas William Rowe
- 1909 William Robert Armstrong
- 1910 Richard Henry Millican
- 1911 Charles Thomas Stableforth
- 1912 Gabriel Theodore de Loriol
- 1913 Herbert Shaw
- 1914 Robert Pettillo Dawson
- 1915 William Bramble
- 1916 Arthur Munro Sutherland
- 1917 Stephen Easten
- 1918 John Graham Cole
- 1919 Richard Mayne
- 1920 Anthony Oates
- 1921 James Lunn
- 1922 David Adams
- 1923 Arthur William Lambert
- 1924 John Grantham
- 1925 Robert Jackson Thompson
- 1926 Robert Stanley Dalgleish
- 1927 Joseph Stephenson
- 1928 William Adams Allan
- 1929 John George Nixon jnr.
- 1930 Joseph William Leech
- 1931 John Leadbitter
- 1932 John William Telford
- 1933 William Locke
- 1934 Gilbert Oliver
- 1935 William Robert Wallace
- 1936 William Taylor (d) Adamson Dawson Russell
- 1937 John Edward Scanlan
- 1938 George Dixon
- 1939 Richard Jordon Richardson (d) Walter Thompson
- 1940 Thomas Clements
- 1941 Richard Embleton
- 1942 James Alexander Clydesdale
- 1944 Ernest George King
- 1945 James Pearson
- 1946 Thomas McCutcheon
- 1947 Thomas Tully
- 1948 Thomas Tully
- 1949 Norman Hackworth Chapman
- 1950 Violet Hardisty Grantham
- 1951 Robert Mould-Graham
- 1952 William Temple
- 1953 Arthur Howell
- 1954 Henry Waller
- 1955 Dorothy Ann Fitzpatrick
- 1956 John William Telford
- 1957 Ethel Beatrice Temple
- 1958 Robert Skinner Gray
- 1959 Gladys Robson
- 1960 George Jacobson
- 1961 Henry Simm
- 1962 Catherine Campbell Scott
- 1963 Jonathan Farries Burton
- 1964 Henry Russell
- 1965 Joseph Christopher Dixon McKenzie
- 1966 Mary Shaw
- 1967 Peter Henry Renwick (d) Isabella McCambridge (d) Robert Skinner Gray
- 1968 Horace John Milton Leigh Criddle
- 1969 Amelia Louisa Storey
- 1970 Watson Oliver
- 1971 Joseph William Norman Petty
- 1972 Thomas Allen Waters
- 1973 Cyril Lipman

== Sheriffs 1996-present ==
- 1996 Mary Isabel Nixon
- 1997 David Serge Slesenger
- 1998 John Cunningham
- 1999 Peter John Stuart Thomson
- 2000 Mary Jane Carr
- 2001 John Marshall
- 2002 Margaret Richardson Carter
- 2003 George William Douglas
- 2004 David Serge Slesenger
- 2005 Diane Margaret Packham
- 2006 Peter John Arnold
- 2007 David Leslie Wood
- 2008 Michael Cookson
- 2009 Brenda Hindmarsh
- 2010 Geoff O'Brien
- 2011 Jackie Slesenger
- 2012 Margaret Wood
- 2013 George Pattison
- 2014 Ian Graham
- 2015 Hazel Stephenson
- 2016 Linda Wright
- 2017 David Down
- 2018 David Cook
- 2019 & 2020 Habib Rahman
- 2021 Anita Lower (d) Karen Robinson
- 2022 Veronica Dunn
- 2023 Maureen Lowson
- 2024 Henry Gallagher
- 2025 Jacqui Robinson
- 2026 Alistair Chisholm
