= High Haswell =

Village in County Durham, England

Coordinates: 54.78686°N 1.43084°W

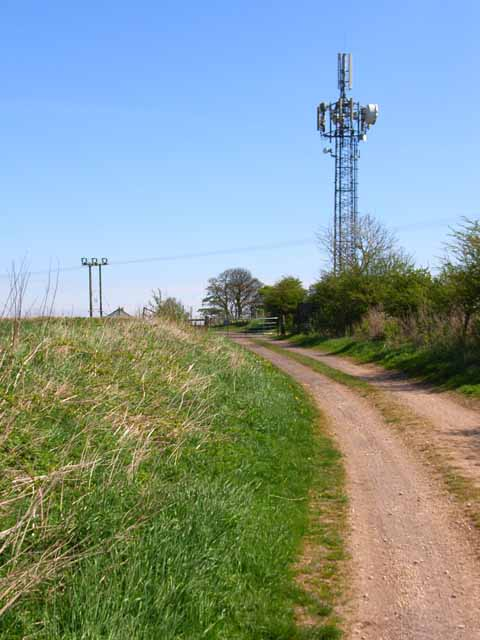
Telecommunications mast at High Haswell (2006)

High Haswell is a settlement in County Durham, in England. It is situated at the crest of a hill close to Haswell, a few miles to the east of Durham. The original village of Haswell was located where High Haswell is now, where only a handful of dwellings and farms remain. There is archaeological evidence of pre-Roman settlement.
