= Anne Finlay =

Scottish painter (1898–1963)

- Born: 1898; Edinburgh, Scotland
- Died: 1963 (aged 64–65); Richmond, England
- Education: Edinburgh College of Art
- Elected: Royal Academy

Anne Finlay (1898–1963) was a Scottish artist.

== Education and artistic career ==
Finlay spent her early years in Edinburgh and attended school in Manor Place in the city, where she studied French. She studied at the Edinburgh College of Art from 1917 to 1920. She studied drawing and painting but did not obtain her diploma.

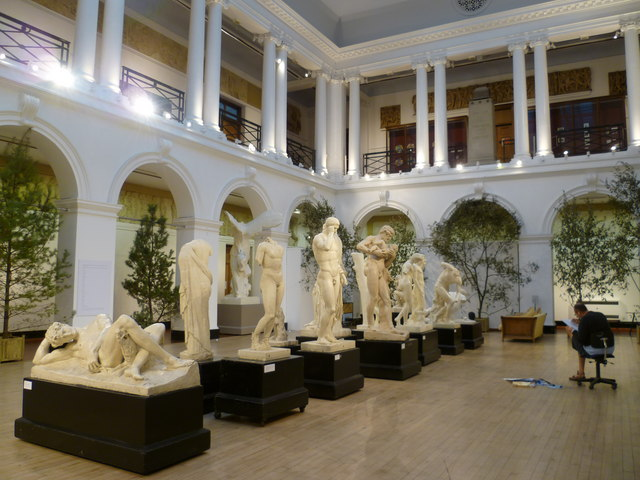
Edinburgh College of Art, Edinburgh

Finlay regularly exhibited at the Royal Academy in London from 1932 onwards, the Royal Scottish Academy and as part of the Society of Women Artists between 1934 and 1956. She was part of the circle of friends who comprised the artists community in Edinburgh at the time. The group included Dorothy Johnstone, Cecile Walton, Eric Robertson, David Macbeth Sutherland and Adam Bruce Thomson. A portrait of Finlay by her friend and fellow artist Johnstone featured in the posters and promotional materials associated with the Modern Scottish Women Exhibition at the Scottish National Gallery of Modern Art in 2015–16. The portrait is owned by Aberdeen Art Gallery She was described as attractive and vivacious, with a 'certain disregard for propriety' and posed as a model for several of the artists in the group. Her nickname was 'Spook'.

Finlay moved to London in 1922 and lived in Hampstead. To support herself she taught French, Art and Music at nearby private schools. She painted portraits of friends and family and invited nieces and nephews to sit for her as models. She enjoyed painting children. She made friends with women who came and went from the baby clinic near her house and made drawings of their babies. Some of these baby portraits were amongst work exhibited at the Orleans Gallery in Richmond. She also painted landscapes. While living in Richmond she painted the river Thames, she kept a caravan near Sittingbourne in Kent, from which she often painted the mudflats at Swale.

== Personal life ==
Her personal life included affairs with the painters James McBey and Ernest Proctor and a relationship with Philip Connard. She lived with Connard in Richmond, England. After her death in 1963 she bequeathed works by Connard and herself to the Borough of Richmond.
