= Robert Anderson (mayor) =

American politician

Robert Anderson was mayor of Williamsburg, Virginia three times. He served from 1812 to 1813, 1820 to 1821 and finally 1828 to 1829.

Preceded by incomplete record	Mayor of Williamsburg, Virginia; 1812–1813	Succeeded by incomplete record

Preceded by incomplete record	Mayor of Williamsburg, Virginia; 1820–1821	Succeeded by incomplete record

Preceded by incomplete record	Mayor of Williamsburg, Virginia; 1828–1829	Succeeded by W. W. Webb
