= Henry Anderson (Cavalier) =

English landowner, politician and MP for Newcastle-upon-Tyne (1582–1659)

Sir Henry Anderson

MP for Newcastle-upon-Tyne
- In office 1640–1643 Serving with John Blakiston
- Preceded by: Sir Peter Riddel; Thomas Liddell
- Succeeded by: John Blakiston
- In office 1614–1626 Serving with William Jenison; Sir Thomas Ridell; Sir Peter Riddel
- Preceded by: Sir George Selby; Henry Chapman/Chipenham
- Succeeded by: Sir Peter Riddel; Sir Thomas Ridell
Civic offices
Mayor of Newcastle-upon-Tyne
In office 1613–1614
| Preceded by | Francis Anderson |
| Succeeded by | William Warmouth |
Honorary titles
Sheriff of Northumberland
In office 1615–1616
| Preceded by | Sir John Clavering |
| Succeeded by | Sir William Selby |

Personal details
- Born: Henry Anderson; 1582 Newcastle-upon-Tyne, Northumberland
- Died: 1659 (aged 76–77) Newcastle-upon-Tyne, Northumberland
- Party: Royalist
- Spouse(s): Mary Remington; Frances (d.1652); Elizabeth Pinour
- Children: 5
- Parent: Henry Anderson (d.1605)
- Relatives: Sir Francis Anderson (cousin)
- Education: Christ Church, Oxford; Gray's Inn
- Occupation: Politician

Sir Henry Anderson (1582–1659) was an English Royalist landowner and politician who represented Newcastle-upon-Tyne once as Mayor and twice as MP in the House of Commons between 1614 and 1643 and was also High Sheriff of Northumberland.

== Early life ==
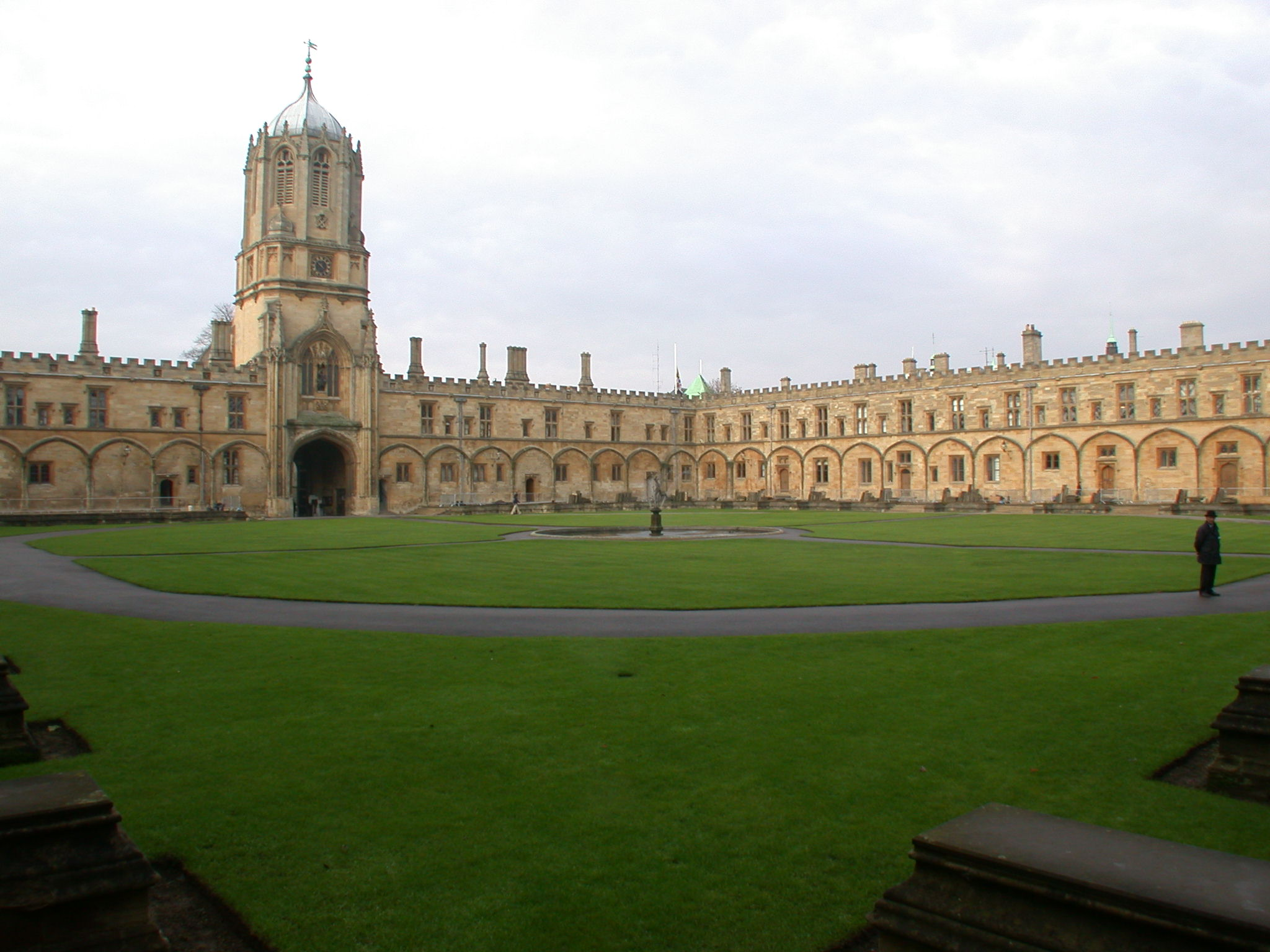
Christ Church, Oxford

Anderson was the son of Henry Anderson (d.1605) of Newcastle-upon-Tyne, Northumberland, and his second wife Fortune Collingwood, daughter of Sir Cuthbert Collingwood of Eslington, Northumberland. His distant cousin was the Royalist Sir Francis Anderson.

He matriculated at Christ Church, Oxford on 24 November 1599, aged 17, when he was of Long Cowton, Yorkshire. He later studied at Gray's Inn.

== Career ==
He was of London when he was knighted at the house of Sir Thomas Hasilrig at Holmby Alderton (4 August 1608). He was Mayor of Newcastle-upon-Tyne (1613–14). In 1614, Anderson was elected Member of Parliament for Newcastle-upon-Tyne (re-elected in 1621, 1624, 1625 and 1626) and was High Sheriff of Northumberland (1615–16). Anderson sold his lands in Tyneside in the later 1620s and settled on an estate at Long Cowton, Yorkshire.

In 1637, he gained an audience with Charles I (through Henry Rich, 1st Earl of Holland and Sir Thomas Jermyn) who he tried to persuade to abandon his policy of Ship Money but the king was angered and rebuked him for his bold manner.

In November 1640, Anderson was re-elected MP for Newcastle-upon-Tyne in the Long Parliament and sat until he was removed for supporting the king on 4 September 1643. During the English Civil War, Anderson was imprisoned for distributing royalist propaganda in 1649 and his debts ensured he remained in prison for the rest of his life. He died between 7 March and 29 June 1659.

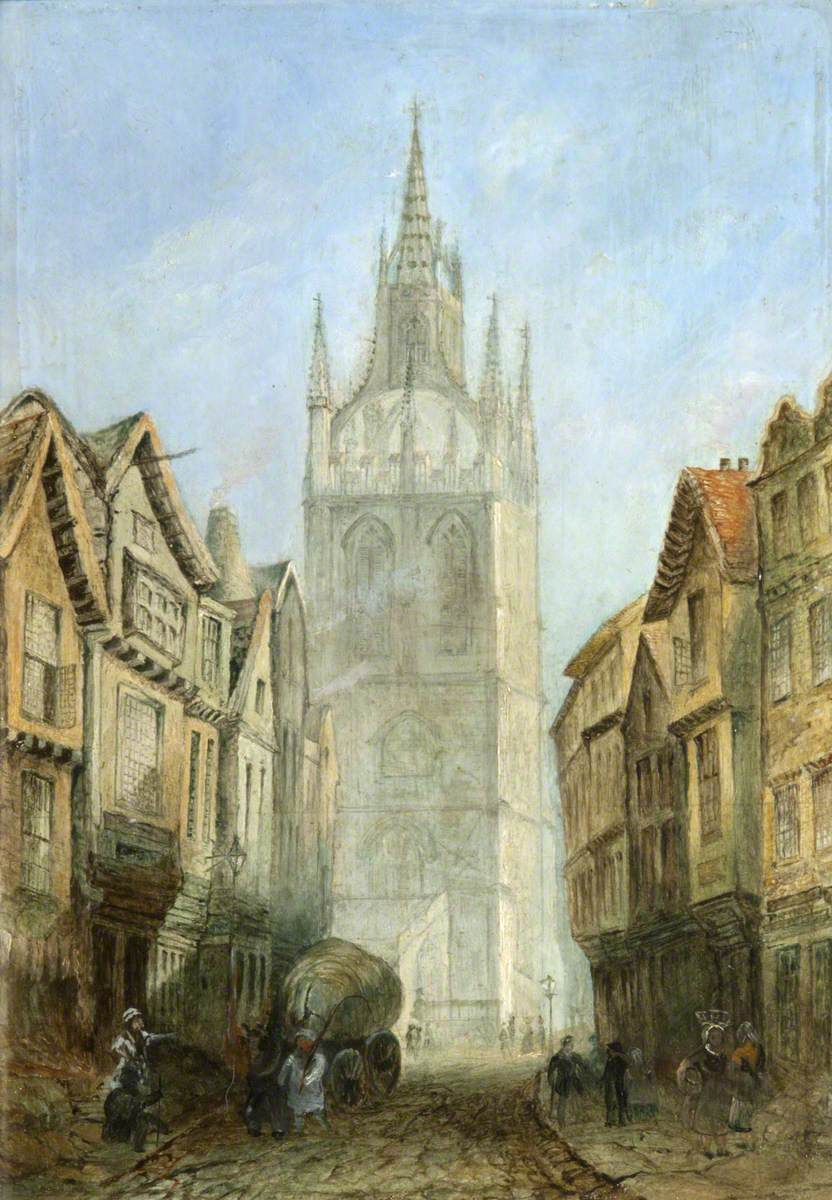
Middle Street, Newcastle

== Family ==
Anderson married Mary Remington, daughter of Richard Remington of Lockington, Yorkshire, and they had four sons (including Richard) and one daughter. Anderson married for the second time to Frances (d. 1652), and married for the third time to Elizabeth Pinour, widow, the daughter of Constance Hopkins.

== Arms ==
Coat of arms of Henry Anderson

Notes
The arms of the Andersons of Newcastle-upon-Tyne
Crest
A bird's head erased Sable, gutté Or, in the beak an arrow point downwards Argent.
Escutcheon
Quarterly: 1 and 4: Gules, three trees Argent; 2 and 3: Or, on a chevron Gules between three birds' heads erased Sable, as many acorns slipped Argent, on a canton Sable three martlets Argent.

Parliament of England
| Preceded by George Selby; Henry Chipenham | Member of Parliament for Newcastle upon Tyne; 1614–1626; With: William Jenison 1614; Sir Thomas Ridell 1621–1622; Sir Peter Riddel 1624–1626 | Succeeded by Sir Peter Riddel; Sir Thomas Ridell |
| Preceded by Sir Peter Riddel; Thomas Liddell | Member of Parliament for Newcastle upon Tyne; 1640–1643; With: John Blakiston | Succeeded by John Blakiston |
Civic offices
| Preceded by Francis Anderson | Mayor of Newcastle-upon-Tyne; 1613-14 | Succeeded by William Warmouth |
Honorary titles
| Preceded by Sir John Clavering | Sheriff of Northumberland; 1615-16 | Succeeded by Sir William Selby |
