= Archibald Eliot Haswell Miller =

Scottish painter, illustrator and curator (1887–1979)

- Born: 10 June 1887; Glasgow, Scotland
- Died: 25 March 1979 (aged 91); Kington Magna, England

Archibald Eliot Haswell Miller (10 June 1887 – 25 March 1979) was a Scottish painter, illustrator and curator. Born in Glasgow, after teaching at the Glasgow School of Art from 1910 to 1930 he went on to be keeper and then deputy director of the National Galleries of Scotland at Edinburgh from 1930 to 1952. Examples of his artwork are in the collections of the Imperial War Museum, Glasgow Museums and Hunterian Museum and Art Gallery.

== Education ==
Miller studied at The Glasgow School of Art under Maurice Greiffenhagen and Jean Delville (1906 -1909) and also travelled to study in Paris, Vienna, Munich and Berlin. He is commemorated in The Glasgow School of Art's World War One Roll of Honour, where he is listed as a captain in the Highland Light Infantry. He was decorated with a Military Cross.

== Professional life ==
Haswell Miller taught at Glasgow School of Art 1910 and 1930. Between 1930 and 1952 he was keeper and then deputy director of the National Galleries of Scotland, Edinburgh. His work was exhibited at the Royal Academy and also at the Royal Scottish Academy. He was elected a member of the Royal Scottish Society of Painters in Watercolour in 1924.

As a painter he specialised military portraits, landscapes and architectural subjects. His work is in the collections of The Imperial War Museum, Glasgow Museum and Art Galleries and The Hunterian Museum and Art Gallery,

GLAHA 55598 GLAHA 55606 GLAHA 55611

== Family ==
A. E. Haswell Miller was married to the artist Elizabeth Josephine Cameron, later known as Josephine Haswell Miller. He lived in Edinburgh, but latterly in Kington Magna, Dorset. A. E. Haswell Miller died in 1979.
