= Josephine Haswell Miller =

British painter (1890–1975)

- Born: Elizabeth Josephine Cameron; 1 October 1890; Glasgow, Scotland
- Died: 1975 1975 (aged 84–85); Dorset, England
- Education: Glasgow School of Art
- Known for: Painting

Josephine Haswell Miller (1 October 1890 – 1975) was a Scottish artist, who studied and later taught at the Glasgow School of Art, and exhibited at the Royal Scottish Academy (RSA).

== Biography ==
Born Elizabeth Josephine Cameron in 1890 in Glasgow to Alan and Helen Cameron. Miller attended Woodside School and then the Glasgow School of Art from 1905 to 1914, where she studied painting and design under Maurice Greiffenhagen and Robert Anning Bell. As a student, Miller painted the mural Science for Possilpark Library. In her final year at the Glasgow School of Art, Miller won the Haldane travelling scholarship which enabled her to study in Paris and later in London with Walter Sickert.

Miller exhibited with the Glasgow Society of Lady Artists from 1914, was awarded the society's Lauder Prize in 1922 and was later made an honorary member.

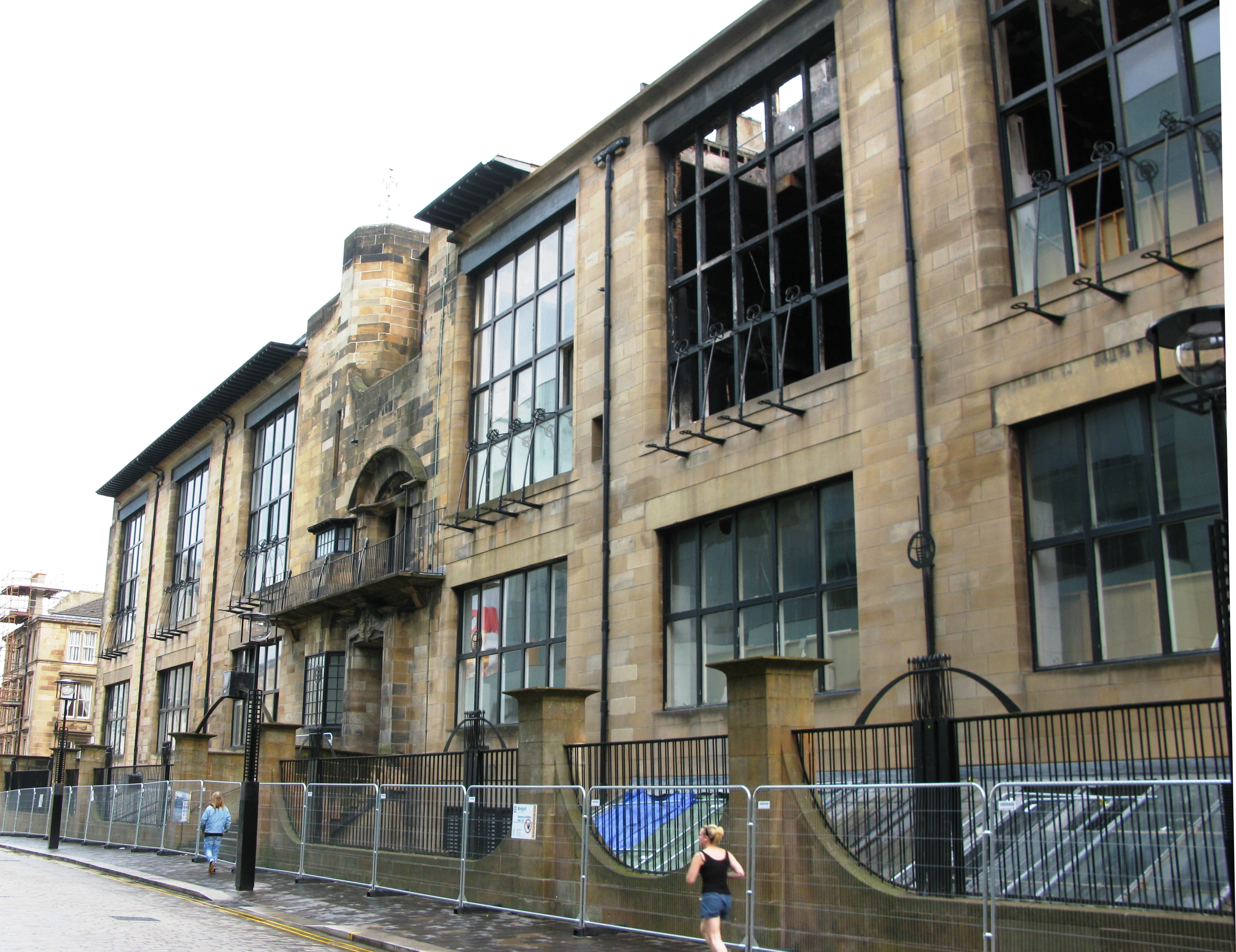
Glasgow School of Art, where Josephine Miller studied and later taught.

Miller married Archibald Eliot Haswell Miller, a military artist and teacher at Glasgow School of Art, in 1916, and the two had a daughter, Sylvia. After their wedding, Miller joined her husband as a member of Glasgow School of Art's teaching staff in 1919, and also worked commercially for Daly's department store in Glasgow, creating fashion drawings and advertisements. In 1923, she and her husband held a joint exhibition. She taught etching and printmaking at the Glasgow School of Art from 1924 to 1932. In 1924 Josephine was elected to the Society of Scottish Artists and in 1938 became the first woman elected an Associate member of the Royal Scottish Academy. When Josephine's husband was appointed Keeper of the Scottish National Portrait Gallery in about 1930, the family moved to Edinburgh. In 1941, Miller became a governor of Edinburgh College of Art. She painted murals in the canteen at the Rosyth Naval Base in 1941 with Mary Armour and Anne Redpath.

In 1952, following Archibald Miller's retirement, the family moved to Dorset. Her RSA pension was withdrawn three years after her departure from Scotland, and she was also debarred from becoming an Academician, however Josephine continued to exhibit at the RSA until her death in 1975.

== Art ==
Miller worked in oils and watercolours, and would paint still lifes of flowers, or scenes from her travels to Europe, which also provided subjects for etchings. Miller is known to have been fiercely self-critical and to have destroyed much of her own work. One of her most famous works, Memories of the Sea, was exhibited at the Royal Academy in 1937. The painting was inspired by the artist's residence at Hailes Cottage in Kingsknowe near Edinburgh. The painting, realised in cool tonalities, is inspired by marine imagery.
