= John Blakiston =

English politician and regicide (c.1603–1649)

John Blakiston (c. 1603–1649), was a member of the English parliament, one of the regicides of King Charles I of England, a prominent mercer and coal merchant, puritan and anti-Episcopalian.

== Biography ==
John Blakiston was born in 1603 in Sedgefield, County Durham, as the third son of Marmaduke Blakiston, Prebendary of York Minster and Durham Cathedral.

In 1626 he married Susan Chamber. He was a fervent financial supporter of the Puritans migrating to America, though he himself never left the country. In 1636 he entered into an ideological dispute with Yeldard Alvey, an Arminian vicar at Newcastle, accusing him of heresy. Alvey emerged victorious from the fray, thanks to the support from Archbishop William Laud. Blakiston was fined and excommunicated.

He served as a member of parliament for Newcastle in the Long Parliament where he voiced republican ideas early on, but did not take up his seat until 1641 due to a contest over the result. In 1645 he was elected Mayor of Newcastle. He was voted an allowance of 4l. a week, from 3 June 1645, until 20 Aug. 1646. According to Noble, he was given the post of coal meter at Newcastle, worth 200l. a year.

He was appointed one of the king's judges, was present at every sitting during the trial. In January 1649, as a commissioner of the High Court of Justice at the trial of King Charles, he was 12th of the 59 signatories on the death warrant of the King.

He died in June 1649. In 1660, following the restoration, his estate was confiscated by the sheriff of Durham.

== In popular culture ==
He's a minor character in Robert Wilton's novel Traitor's Field, published in May 2013 by Corvus, an imprint of Atlantic Books.

== Bibliography ==
- Stephen Foster (1991), The Long Argument: English Puritanism and the Shaping of New England Culture, 1570-1700, UNC Press, ISBN 0-8078-4583-3
