= Ord, Northumberland =

Civil parish in Northumberland, England

Coordinates: 55.757°N 2.025°W

Ord
- Location within Northumberland
- Population: 1,374 (2011 census)
- OS grid reference: NT985515
- Unitary authority: Northumberland
- Ceremonial county: Northumberland
- Region: North East
- Country: England
- Sovereign state: United Kingdom
- Post town: Berwick-upon-Tweed
- Postcode district: TD15
- Police: Northumbria
- Fire: Northumberland
- Ambulance: North East
- UK Parliament: Berwick-upon-Tweed

Ord is a civil parish in Northumberland, England. According to the 2001 census it had a population 1,365, increasing slightly to 1,374 at the 2011 Census. The parish is situated to the south-west of the town of Berwick-upon-Tweed, and includes the settlements of East Ord and Murton. The parish is bound to the north by the River Tweed, and to the south by the Aller Dean.

The parish was created in 1891 from part of the Tweedmouth parish.
