= Haswell, County Durham =

Village in County Durham, England

Coordinates: 54.7834°N 1.4177°W

Haswell
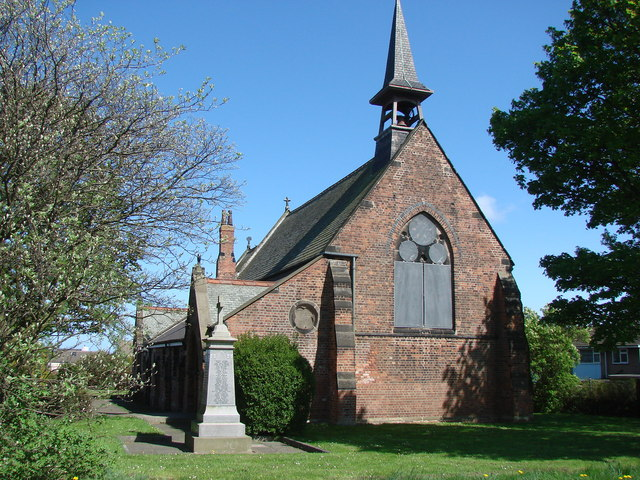
- St Paul's Parish Church, Haswell

- Location within County Durham
- Population: 1,831 (2011)
- OS grid reference: NZ375433
- Unitary authority: County Durham
- Ceremonial county: County Durham
- Region: North East
- Country: England
- Sovereign state: United Kingdom
- Post town: DURHAM
- Postcode district: DH6
- Dialling code: 0191
- Police: Durham
- Fire: County Durham and Darlington
- Ambulance: North East
- UK Parliament: Easington

Haswell is a village in County Durham, in England. It is situated 6 miles (9.7 km) east of the city of Durham, 9 miles (14 km) south of the city of Sunderland and 3.1 miles (5.0 km) north-west of the town of Peterlee.

== History ==
The original settlement of Haswell was located where High Haswell is now on the hilltop before the village's centre moved downhill to its modern location on Salter's Lane. In the 14th century, Haswell's small population was nearly wiped out by the Black Death.

Resting on a limestone escarpment, coal was discovered in the early 19th century and a colliery was sunk by 1831. Haswell became home to the first coal mine in the world with a steel cable down its mine shaft. On 28 September 1844, a blackdamp explosion in the Little Pit, Hutton seam, killed 95 Haswell Coal Company workers, with just four survivors. The colliery closed in 1896, and Haswell's population collapsed by 1901 after the miners left, leaving behind a rural settlement.

== Notable people ==
Haswell was the birthplace of world champion road racing cyclist Tom Simpson, born 30 November 1937, who died aged 29 on Mont Ventoux during the 1967 Tour de France.

== Sources ==
- Atkinson, Frank (1979). The Great Northern Coalfield 1700-1900. Newcastle upon Tyne: Frank Graham. ISBN 0 85983 121 3.
