= Ant–fungus mutualism =

Symbiotic relationship

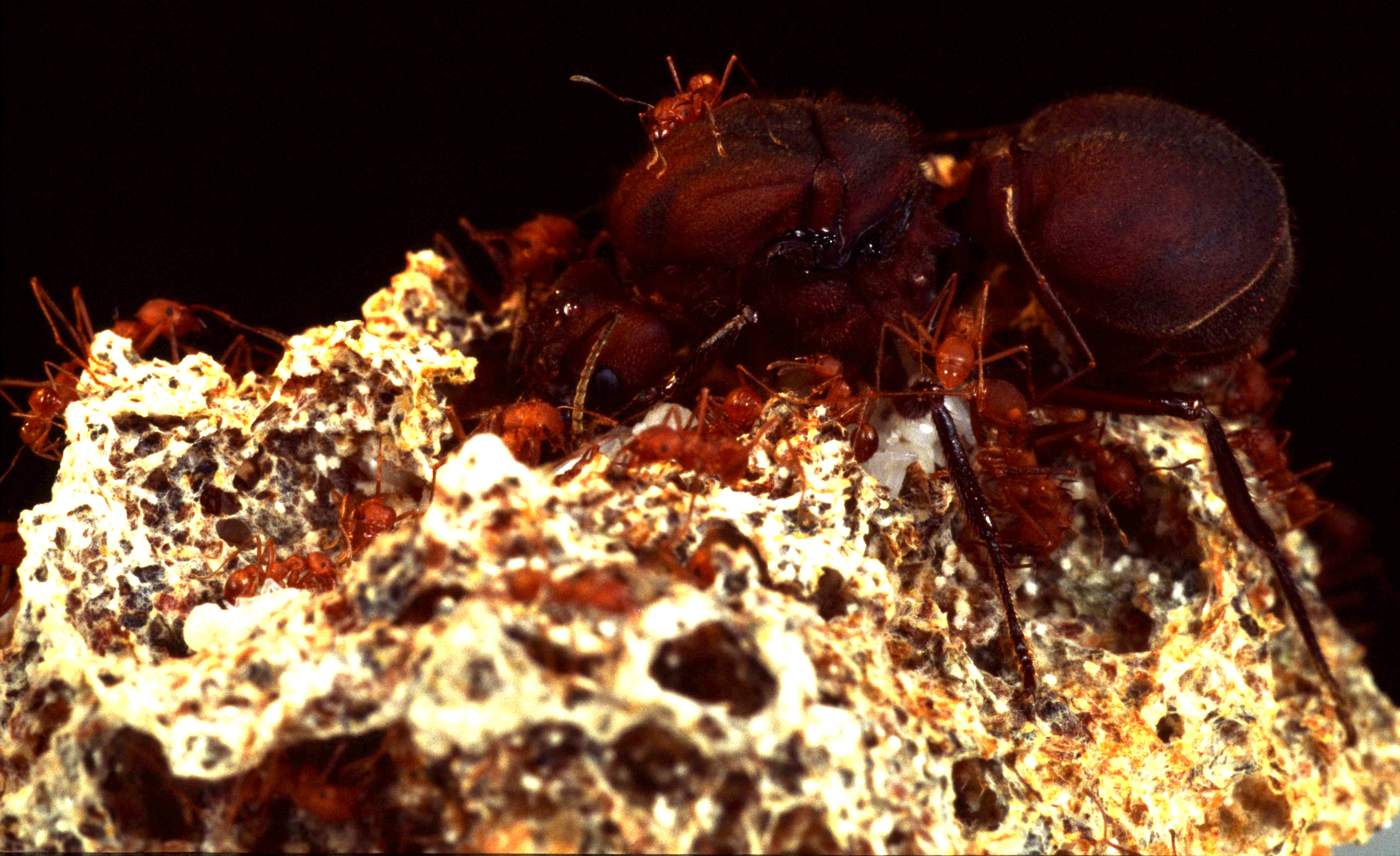
Atta colombica queen

Ant–fungus mutualism is a symbiosis seen between certain ant and fungal species, in which ants actively cultivate fungus much like humans farm crops as a food source. There is evidence of only two instances in which this form of agriculture evolved in ants resulting in a dependence on fungi for food. These instances were the attine ants and some ants that are part of the Megalomyrmex genus. In some species, the ants and fungi are dependent on each other for survival. This type of codependency is prevalent among herbivores who rely on plant material for nutrition. The fungus' ability to convert the plant material into a food source accessible to their host makes them the ideal partner. The leafcutter ant is a well-known example of this symbiosis. Leafcutter ants species can be found in southern South America up to the United States. However, ants are not the only ground-dwelling arthropods which have developed symbioses with fungi. A similar mutualism with fungi is also noted in termites within the subfamily Macrotermitinae which are widely distributed throughout the Old World tropics with the highest diversity in Africa.

== Overview ==
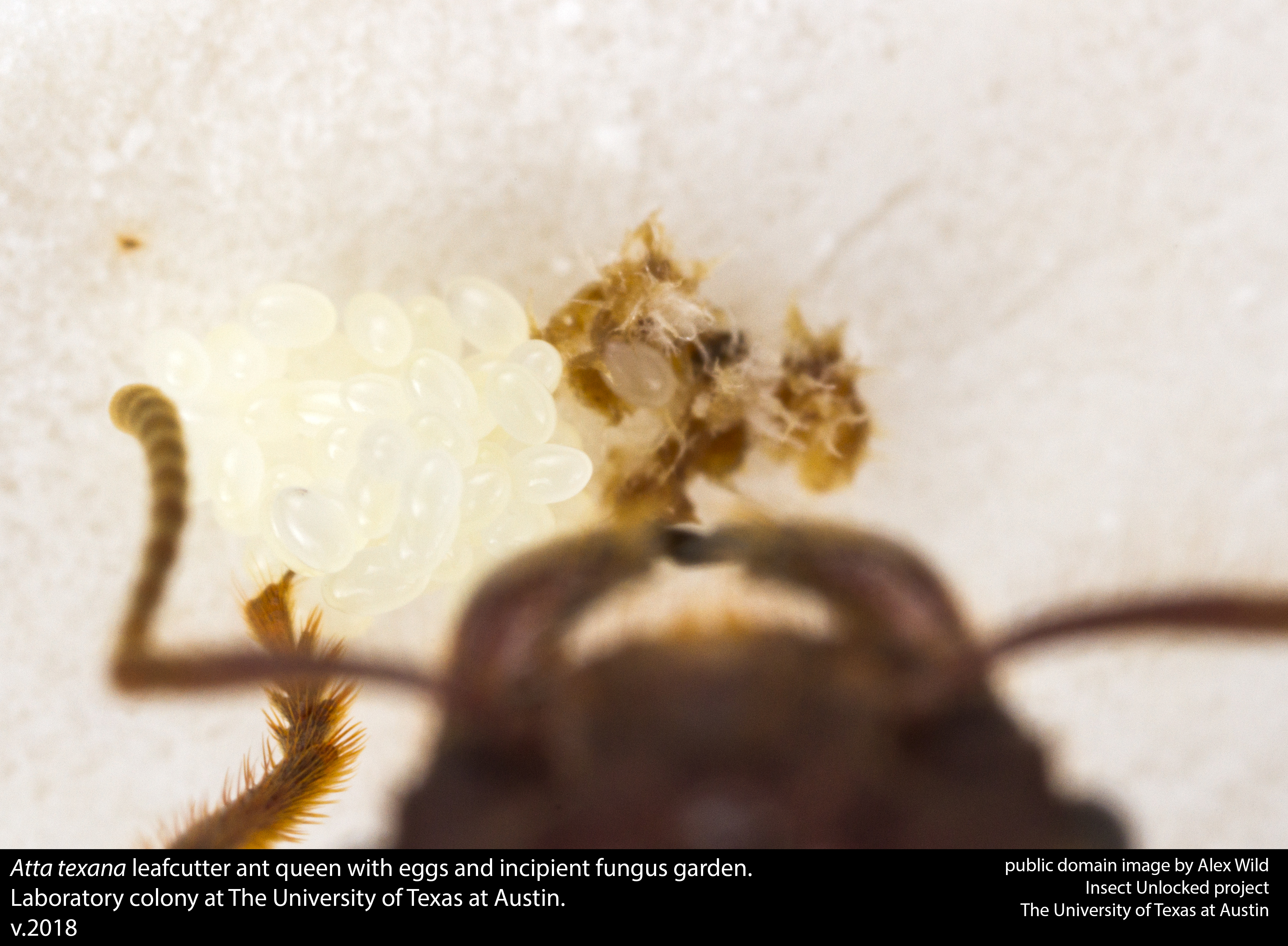
Until the first generation of the new colony is born and matures, the queen will have to cultivate the fungus herself. When a queen is establishing a new colony, she brings a fungal cultivar from her previous colony and lays her eggs around it. Once the eggs mature, she retires from cultivating and continues to lay as many as 20,000 eggs to establish the rest of the colony.

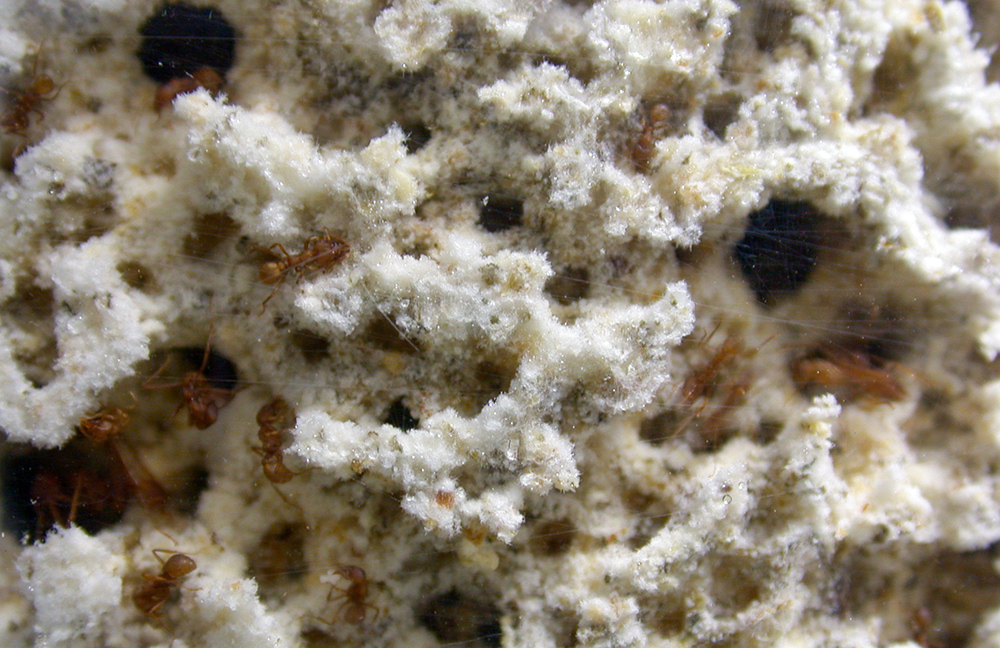
Atta, "higher attine" ants and their cultivar fungus

Fungus-growing ants actively propagate, nurture, and defend Lepiotaceae and other lineages of basidiomycete fungus. In return, the fungus provides nutrients for the ants, which may accumulate in specialized hyphal-tips known as "gongylidia". These growths are synthesized from plant substrates and are rich in lipids and carbohydrates. In some advanced genera the queen ant may take a pellet of the fungus with her when she leaves to start a new colony. There are three castes of female worker ants in Attini colonies which all participate in foraging plant matter to feed the fungal cultivar. The lowest caste, minor, is smallest in size but largest in number and is primarily responsible for maintaining the fungal cultivar for the rest of the colony. The symbiosis between basidiomycete fungi and attine ants involves the fungal pathogen, Escovopsis, and an actinomycetes bacterial symbiont, Pseudonocardia. This indicates that the evolutionary relationship is not restricted between fungus and ants but incorporates a community of symbionts.

== Types ==
There are five main types of agriculture that fungus-growing ants practice: Lower, coral fungi, yeast, generalized higher, and leafcutter agricultural systems. Lower agriculture is the most primitive system and is currently practiced by 80 species in 10 genera. This classification is given in regards to the morphology of the fungus they cultivate for their gardens. Lower agriculture commonly involves smaller nests and they use techniques besides cutting leaves to obtain plant material. Coral-fungus agriculture is practiced by 34 species by a single derived clade within the genus Apterostigma. The coral fungus farmers underwent a switch of cultivars, or the desired farmed fungal tissue culture between 10 and 20 million years ago to a non-leucocoprineaceous fungus, which makes its choice of cultivar different from all other attines. Yeast agriculture is practiced by 18 species of Cyphomyrmex rimosus. The C. rimosus group is hypothesized to have evolved growing fungus in a yeast form between 5 and 25 million years ago. Generalized higher agriculture is practiced by 63 species in two genera and refers to the condition of highly domesticated fungus. The fungi used in higher agriculture cannot survive without its agriculturalists to tend it and has phenotypic changes that allow for increased ease of ant harvesting. Leafcutter agriculture, which is a more highly derived form of higher agriculture, is practiced by 40 species in two genera and has the most recent evolution, originating between 8 and 12 million years ago. Within this system of higher agriculture, leafcutter ants craft the most optimal environment for their fungus by excluding them from the competition. Leaf cutters use living biomass as the substrate to feed their fungi, whereas in all other types of agriculture, the fungus requires dead biomass.

== The attines ==
The ants of the Attini tribe (subfamily Myrmicinae) are obligatory fungicultivists. Before the first obligated cultivars were domesticated, attines kept limited, slow-growing gardens. Attini form twelve genera with over 200 species, which for the most part cultivate Lepiotaceae fungi of the tribe Leucocoprineae. These ants are typically subdivided into the "lower" and "higher" attines. One of the more distinguishing factors between these two subgroups is their respective cultivars and cultivar substrates. Lower attines have less specialized cultivars that more closely resemble Leucocoprineae found in the wild and use "ancestral substrates" composed of plant, wood, arthropod, and flower detritus. The higher attines, on the other hand, use freshly cut grass, leaves, and flowers as their fungi substrate (hence the common name "leafcutter ants") and cultivate highly derived fungi. This behavior of using fresh plant matter in industrial-scale farming evolved 15-20 million years ago. The cultivars of higher attines often have growths called gongylidia -—nutrient-rich structures that have evolved for easy harvesting, ingesting, and feeding to larvae, while simultaneously serving as propagules for the fungi. The higher attine cultivars of gongylidia were domesticated about 30 million years ago. The attine's use of fresh garden substrate for maintaining the gardens marked the start of the obligatory symbiotic relationship. These higher attines utilize the Leucoagaricus gongylophorus fungus, specifically.

The symbiosis between attine ants and Leucoagaricus fungi is not purely beneficial, but obligatory. The fungal cultivar provides the ants with food, but limits their diet to the monoculture gongylidia growth. Without the ants, the L. gongylophorus cultivar monoculture would be highly susceptible to infections. The fungus develops adaptations to its perceived threats by modifying the gongylidia. The gongylidia provide the ants with highly nutritious food, resulting in antifungal feces. This feature benefits the cultivar, limiting the spread of alien microflora such as the fungal parasite Escovopsis.

== Partner fidelity ==
Partner fidelity can be witnessed through vertical gene transmission of fungi when a new colony is begun. First, the queen must mate with several males to inseminate her many eggs before she flies off to a different location to begin a new colony. As she leaves, she takes with her a cluster of mycelium (the vegetative portion of the fungus) and begins a new fungal garden at her resting point using this mycelium. This grows to become the new fungal farm complete with the genes of the original cultivar preserved for another generation of ants. The relationship between attine ants and the Lepiotaceae fungus is so specialized that in many cases, the Lepiotaceae is not found outside of ant colony nests. It is clear that evolutionary pressure has been exerted on these ants to develop an organized system in which they feed the fungus and continue its reproduction.

Studies done (with the concept of the prisoner's dilemma in mind) to test what further drives partner fidelity among species have shown that external factors are an even greater driving force. The effects of cheating ants (ants who did not bring plant biomass for fungal food) had a much smaller effect on the fitness of the relationship than when the fungi cheated by not providing gongylidia. Both effects were exacerbated in the presence of infection by Escovopsis, resulting in close to a 50% loss in fungal biomass. It is clear that the risk of infection from parasites is a driving external factor in keeping these two species loyal to one another. Though external factors play a large role in maintaining fidelity between the mutualists, genetic evidence of vertical transmission of partner fidelity has been found among asexual, fungus-cultivating ant species. Factors such as vertical transmission do not play as strong a role as environmental factors in maintaining fidelity, as cultivar switching among ant species is not a highly uncommon practice.

== Secondary symbiotic relationships ==
There are additional symbiotic relationships that affect fungal agriculture. The fungus Escovopsis is a parasite in fungus-growing ant colonies that can greatly harm the fungal gardens through infection, and the bacterium Pseudonocardia has a mutualistic relationship with ants. The relationship is thought to have been used by the ants for millions of years, co-evolving to produce the right type of antibiotics. Attine ants culture the antibiotic-producing bacterium Pseudonocardia which they use to control Escovopsis. The reason for the lack of antibiotic resistance in Escopovosis due to this long-standing secondary symbiont is unknown. Targeted microbial isolations revealed that Pseudonocardia bacteria are located in specialized structures along the exoskeleton of the ant. Pseudonocardia bacteria reside on the female reproductive ants' integuments, and assist in defending the ants from Escovopsis through the production of these secondary metabolites.

In fact, some species of ants have evolved exocrine glands that apparently nourish the antibiotic-producing bacteria inside them. A black yeast interferes with this mutualism. The yeast has a negative effect on the bacteria that normally produce antibiotics to kill the parasitic Escovopsis, and so may affect the ants' health by allowing the parasite to spread. It has been suggested that the black yeast impedes the growth of Pseudonocardia by using up nutrients produced by the bacteria which indirectly helps the survival and spread of the Escovopsis infection.

== Farming behaviors ==
Attine ants perform a variety of farming behaviors to maintain the fungal colony. The colonies are located in shallow, below-ground nests and often found in natural holes between rocks and roots. To optimize the growth of their fungal cultivar, attine ants open and close tunnels to maintain the ideal temperature and humidity in their below-ground structures for fungus farming. Secretions from leaf-cutter metapleural and labial glands are used by the ants for their fungistatic and bacteriostatic qualities. The application of these secretions across the surface of the fungus inhibit the growth of harmful pathogens. Leaf-cutting ants weed the fungal colony by chewing off sections that are infected by fungal parasites, commonly Escovopsis, and discarding the waste material to prevent the spread of pathogens through the colony.

Studies have shown that other insects use chemical signatures of volatile organic compounds to recognize fungus strains. It is likely that fungus growing ants use the chemical profile of their cultivar to identify microbes they do not want in the garden. Delayed rejection has been observed in leaf-cutting ants in response to plant substrates which were detrimental to the fungal colony. The fungi are able to communicate this to the ants through chemical signaling that the ants receive via their antennal olfactory neuron sensors. The signals are processed and form long-term memory associations, allowing the ants to differentiate between substrates for the cultivar.

== Evolution ==
Given the exclusive New World distribution of the over 200 fungus-growing ant species, this mutualism is thought to have originated in the basin of the Amazon rainforest some 50–66 million years ago. This would be after the K-Pg event and before the Eocene Optimum. During the fallout of the K-Pg event, the ancestor of the attine ants speciated as the resources it depended on as a generalized hunter-gatherer grew scarce. At the same time, the sister group of the attine ants Dacetina developed predatory behavior during the same drive for new resources. The ant-fungus mutualism did not evolve symmetrically. Ants quickly lost the ability to synthesize arginine by losing the argininosuccinate lyase gene, the final step in the arginine biosynthesis pathway. This created an immediate dependency on their cultivars for providing the needed amino acid and is supported by the lack of reversal to hunter-gatherer lifestyles. The species Cyatta abscondita is considered the most recent ancestor of all leaf-cutting ants.

Though the ants are monophyletic, their fungal symbionts are not. They fall roughly into three major groups, only G1 having evolved gongylidia. Those in G3 are paraphyletic, the most heterogeneous, and form the most loose relationships with their cultivators. G1 and G3 species are Lepiotaceous fungi which includes Leucoagaricus gongylophorus, the species cultivated by higher attine ants including Atta and Acromyrmex.

G2 species grow long hyphae that form a protective cover over the nest which is described as a 'veiled garden' with nests being suspended under logs or inside cavities within them and only rarely found in cavities in the ground. Mycelial threads are hypothesized to be woven together by the ants. A forth species, G4 is related but is not observed to be woven into these veiled gardens or suspended. It is cultivated in spongelike masses on the bottom of the garden cavity either under logs or in cavities excavated in the ground. This nest building behaviour is more similar to that of lower attine ants which engage in cultivation of Lepiotaceous fungi belonging to the G3 group. Both species are cultivated by members of the genus Apterostigma with G2 found in nests belonging to the Apterostigma dentigerum subclade and G4 in Apterostigma manni subclade nests. Only one species of Apterostigma, Apterostigma auriculatum was documented as cultivating the G3 fungus.

In 2014 the G2 fungus was classified as Pterula velohortorum and the G4 as Pterula nudihortorum by the American mycologist Bryn Tjader Mason Dentinger. Phylogenetic analysis published in 2020 created the genus Myrmecopterula and reclassified these species as Myrmecopterula velohortorum and Myrmecopterula nudihortorum. These species have not been documented as producing fertile fruiting bodies and are therefore presumed to be entirely reliant on the ants. A third species, Myrmecopterula moniliformis was placed in this genus in 2020 and has been observed to produce both fertile and infertile fruiting bodies meaning it is capable of surviving without the ants. One hypothesis is that it may have descended from a lineage of ant-domesticated fungi which escaped from cultivation to become free-living fungi however it is also still observed as growing on ant nests. Studies now show that fungi belonging to lower attine ants are not obligate mutualists and are capable of free-living. The fungi were earlier thought to be propagated by ants purely through clonal (vegetative) means. However considerable genetic variation in the fungi suggests that this may not be the case.

It is hypothesized that fungi have evolved to make themselves more attractive to ant species through the development of enzymes that allow the ants to access nutrition in the fungal mass. This most likely occurred 25-35 million years ago, when attine ants domesticated their fungal cultivars in dry or seasonally dry locations in Central or North America, allowing for genetic isolation of the fungus. This development is the transition from lower agriculture to higher agriculture. During this period the fungal cultivars lost a series of genes that allowed them to decompose a wide variation of substrates. At the same time they appear to have committed fully to propagation by the vertical transmission practiced by attine ants and at the end of their allopatry were no longer able to sexually reproduce with their free-living cousins or lower-attine counterparts.

A further specialization occurred from the opportunity that this coevolution offered. Up until this point the ant host had been feeding their cultivars primarily with detritus and fecal matter. The shift towards herbivory consisted of certain groups of attine ants (the ancestors of Atta and Acromyrmex) shifting towards fresh plant matter as a substrate for growing their gardens. This shift provided the opportunity for the development of industrial-scale agriculture that we now see in the Atta and Acromyrmex genera.

There is debate in the field on the "tightness" of the coevolution between ants and their fungal cultivars. While the observed vertical transmission of fungal cultivars and strong host-symbiont specificity might suggest a tight coevolutionary relationship, recent phylogenetic analyses suggest this is not the case. Multiple domestications of the same fungus, fungal escape from domestication, or cultivar switching could lead to the observed diffuse coevolutionary pattern. The alternative perspective of a "tight" coevolution points to evidence of instability in horizontal transmission events, while also postulating that the observed differences between the phylogenies of attine ants and their fungal cultivars correspond to speciation events.

== See also ==
- Ants' mutualism with aphids
- Trophobiosis
