= Pterulicium caricis-pendulae =

Scientific classification
- Kingdom: Fungi
- Division: Basidiomycota
- Class: Agaricomycetes
- Order: Agaricales
- Family: Pterulaceae
- Genus: Pterulicium
- Species: P. caricis-pendulae

Binomial name
- Pterulicium caricis-pendulae (Corner) Leal-Dutra, Dentinger & G.W. Griff (2020)

Synonyms
- Pterula caricis-pendulae Corner (1970)

Species of fungus

Pterulicium caricis-pendulae Mycological characteristics
- Smooth hymenium
- Spore print is white
- Ecology is saprotrophic
- Edibility is unknown

Pterulicium caricis-pendulae is a species of mushroom producing fungus in the family Pterulaceae. It has the common name pendulous sedge club.

== Taxonomy ==
It was first described in 1970 by Edred John Henry Corner who classified it as Pterula caricis-pendulae.

In 2020 the Pterulaceae family was reclassified based on phylogenetic analysis and many species were split into Pterula, Myrmecopterula, Pterulicium and Phaeopterula genera. This species was one of them and was reclassified as Pterulicium caricis-pendulae by the mycologists Caio A. Leal-Dutra, Bryn Tjader Mason Dentinger and Gareth W. Griffith in 2020.

== Description ==
Pterulicium caricis-pendulae is a small whitish coral fungus with a delicate branching structure.

Fruit body: 0.5-2mm thin, hairlike coral that is sparsely branched with smooth and shiny pointed tips. Stem: Absent. Flesh: White. Tough and rubbery. Spore print: White. Spores: Elongated ellipsoid and smooth. 5.5-7.5 x 3-4μm. Basidia: 4-spored. Taste: Indistinct. Smell: Indistinct.

== Habitat and distribution ==
This species is not commonly recorded in the United Kingdom and is on the Red List as a near threatened species. It has been found in woodland and marshes growing on decaying debris from the Carex pendula sedge as well as Juncus rushes and Symphytum. It grows solitary or in small trooping groups.

As of October 2022, GBIF has fewer than 20 recorded observations for this species with most being from Europe.

== Etymology ==
The specific epithet caricis-pendulae derives from the Latin 'caricinus' meaning like sedge (Carex) and 'pendulus' meaning hanging.

== Similar species ==
- Pterulicium gracile is described similarly and is distinguished based on microscopic characteristics.
