= Pterulicium gracile =

Scientific classification
- Kingdom: Fungi
- Division: Basidiomycota
- Class: Agaricomycetes
- Order: Agaricales
- Family: Pterulaceae
- Genus: Pterulicium
- Species: P. gracile

Binomial name
- Pterulicium gracile (Corner) Leal-Dutra, Dentinger & G.W. Griff (2020)

Synonyms
- Typhula gracilis Desm. & Berk (1838); Pistillaria gracilis Pat. (1886); Hirsutella gracilis Pat. (1892); Pterula gracilis Corner (1950); Clavaria aculina Quél. (1881); Pistillaria aculina Pat. (1886); Ceratella aculina Pat. (1887); Cnazonaria aculina Donk (1933); Typhula brunaudii Quél. (1885); Clavaria brunaudii Sacc. (1888); Pistillaria brunaudii Costantin & L.M.Dufour (1891); Ceratella brunaudii Mussat (1901); Ceratella ferryi Quél. & Fautrey (1893); Pistillaria ferryi Sacc. (1895); Mucronella rickii Oudem. (1902); Cnazonaria rickii Donk (1933); Ceratellopsis rickii Corner (1950); Pistillaria ferryi subsp. tremula Sacc. & D.Sacc. (1905); Ceratellopsis tremula Corner (1950); Pistillaria aculina subsp. juncicola Bourdot & Galzin (1927)

Species of fungus

Pterulicium gracile Mycological characteristics
- Smooth hymenium
- Spore print is white
- Ecology is saprotrophic
- Edibility is unknown

Pterulicium gracile is a species of mushroom producing fungus in the family Pterulaceae.

== Taxonomy ==
This species has a long and complex taxonomic history owing to there being multiple basionyms during the 1800s each of which was reclassified multiple times before ultimately being merged. Amongst others, it has previously been classified as a Typhula or Clavaria species owing to the similar colour, form and diminutive size members of this genus have. The large number of synonyms this species has a result of all these reclassifications speaks to both how often it was found and the lack of significant distinguishing features to separate it neatly from other coral fungi.

The earliest classification of this species was as Typhula gracilis in 1838 by John Baptiste Henri Joseph Desmazières and Miles Joseph Berkeley so the specific epithet gracilis is the one that was retained.

In 1950 the species was reclassified as Pterula gracilis by the British mycologist Edred John Henry Corner. At the time he considered Ceratellopsis rickii and Ceratellopsis tremula to be distinct species however these are now regarded as synonyms.

In 2020 the Pterulaceae family was reclassified based on phylogenetic analysis and many species were split into Pterula, Myrmecopterula, Pterulicium and Phaeopterula genera. This species was one of them and was reclassified as Pterulicium gracile by the mycologists Caio A. Leal-Dutra, Bryn Tjader Mason Dentinger and Gareth W. Griffith in 2020.

== Description ==
Pterulicium gracile is a small whitish coral fungus with a delicate branching structure.

Fruit body: 2-10mm thin, hairlike coral that is densely crowded and sometimes forks towards the smooth and shiny pointed tips. Stem: 0.5-1mm but may be absent. Flesh: White. Tough and rubbery. Spore print: White. Spores: Elongated ellipsoid and smooth. 5.5-7.5 x 3-4μm. Basidia: 2-spored. Taste: Indistinct. Smell: strong and unpleasant like chemicals.

== Habitat and distribution ==
This species is not commonly recorded in the United Kingdom and is said to be widespread but rarely reported. It has been founded on decaying vegetable matter, leaves and the stems of herbaceous plants in deciduous woodland and marshes. Though it may grow on other plant matter. It grows solitary or in small trooping groups.

As of October 2022, GBIF has fewer than 100 recorded observations for Pterulicium gracile and around 200 for the previous taxon Pterula gracilis. Most of these are from Europe.

== Etymology ==
The specific epithet gracile (originally gracilis) derives from the Latin 'gracilis' meaning graceful.

== Similar species ==
- Pterulicium caricis-pendulae is described similarly and is distinguished based on microscopic characteristics.
