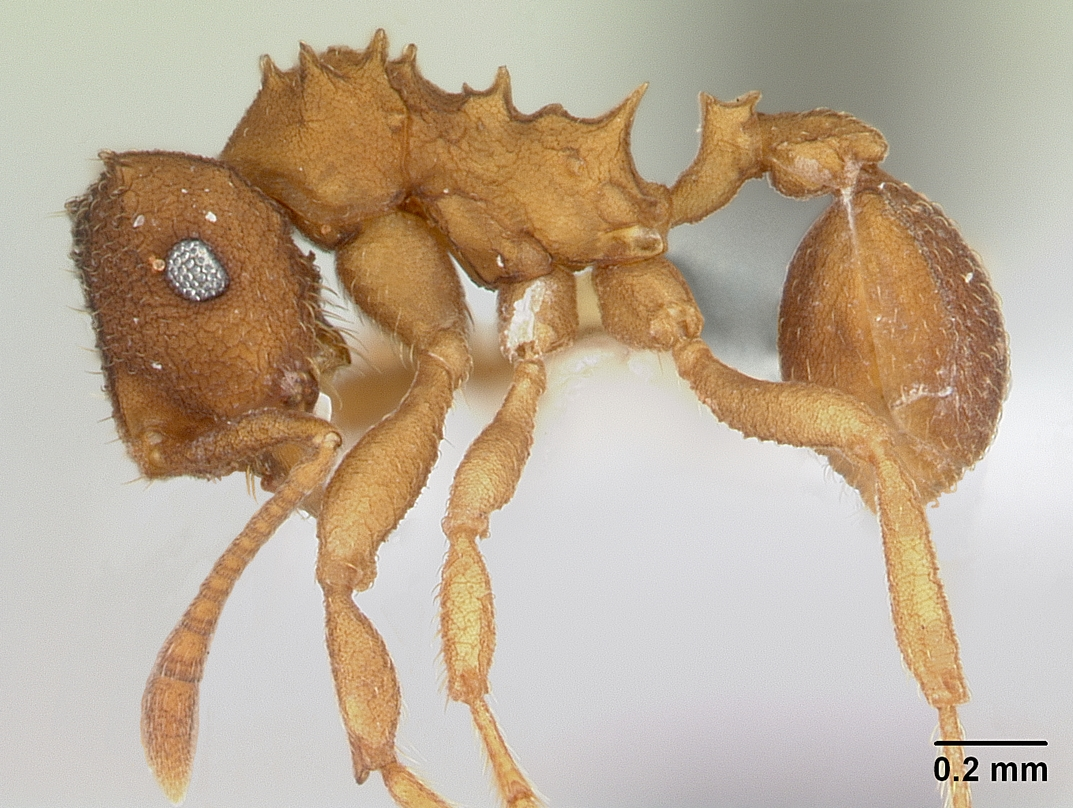
- Specimen of Mycocepurus smithii

Scientific classification
- Kingdom: Animalia
- Phylum: Arthropoda
- Clade: Pancrustacea
- Class: Insecta
- Order: Hymenoptera
- Family: Formicidae
- Subfamily: Myrmicinae
- Genus: Mycocepurus
- Species: M. smithii

Binomial name
- Mycocepurus smithii (Forel, 1893)
- Distribution of Mycocepurus smithii

= Mycocepurus smithii =

Species of ant

Mycocepurus smithii is a species of fungus-growing ant from Latin America. This species is widely distributed geographically and can be found from Mexico in the north to Argentina in the south, as well as on some Caribbean Islands. It lives in a variety of forested habitats and associated open areas. Two studies published in 2009 demonstrated that some populations of the species consist exclusively of females which reproduce via thelytokous parthenogenesis. A detailed study found evidence of sexual reproduction in some populations in the Brazilian Amazon. Accordingly, M. smithii consists of a mosaic of sexually and asexually reproducing populations. In asexual populations all ants in a single colony are female clones of the queen. Inside the colony, the ants cultivate a garden of fungus grown with pieces of dead vegetable matter, dead insects, and insect droppings.

== Description ==
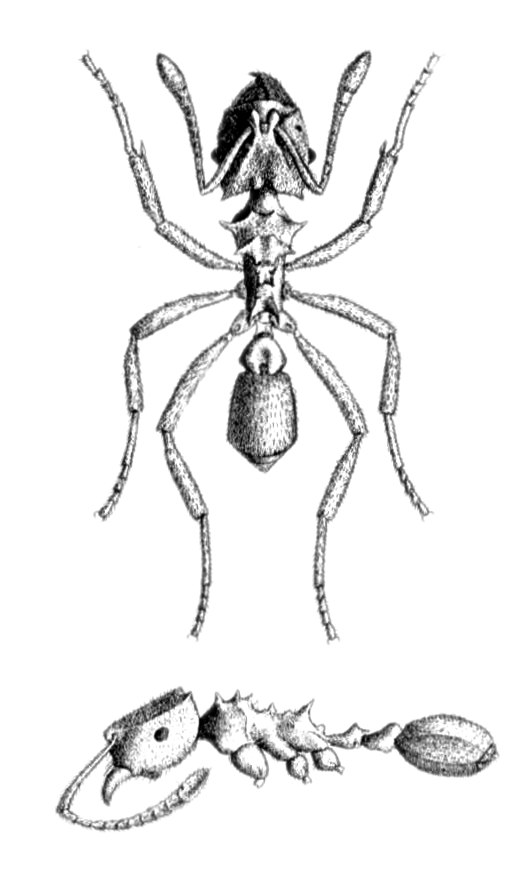
Mycocepurus smithii plate

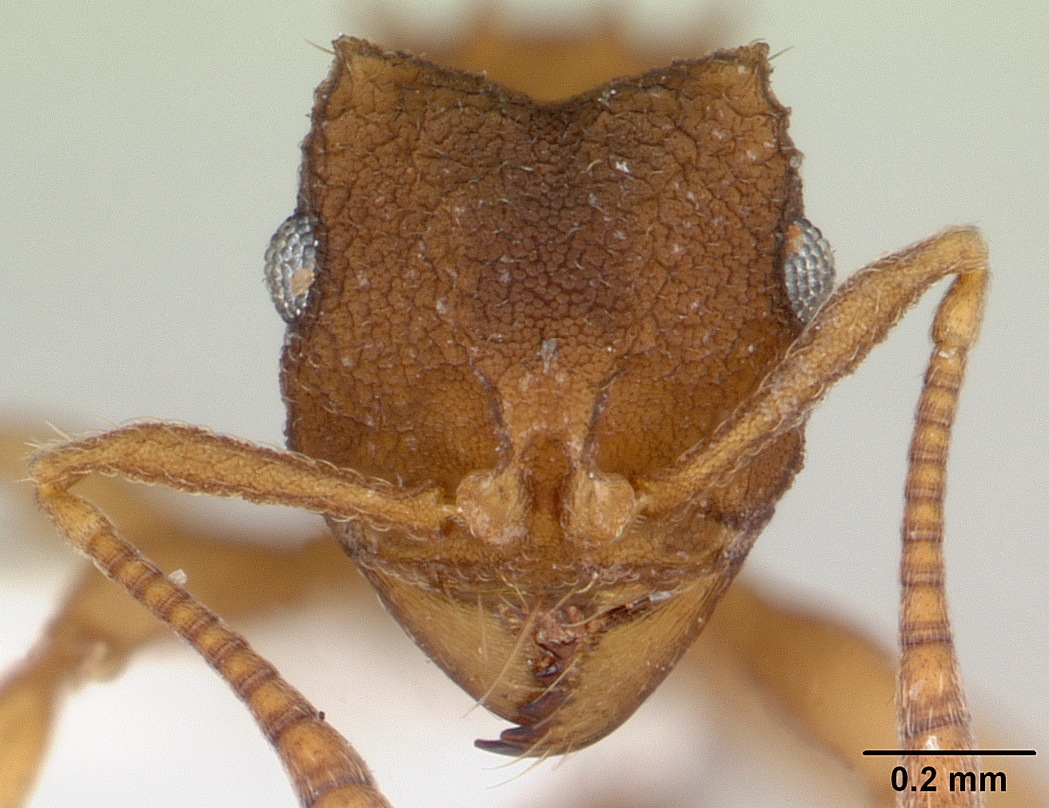
Close up of a head of a Mycocepurus smithii

Ants of the genus Mycocepurus are distinctly recognizable for the crown-like cluster of spines on their promesonotum, the fused mesonotum and pronotum on the front of their mesosoma or midsection. Mycocepurus smithii has sharp, protruding propodeal (posterior of the alitrunk) spines unlike M. obsoletus whose propodeal spines are blunt. Workers also do not have developed promesonotal spines in the center of their crown, which separates M. smithii from M. goeldii and similar species.

== Reproduction ==
Initially, M. smithii was thought to only reproduce asexually because no evidence of male individuals had been found. This led to M. smithii being recognized as the first fungus-growing ant species to reproduce via thelytokous parthenogenesis, where females, the workers and reproductive queens, are produced asexually. The cytogenetic mechanism of thelytoky is either apomixis (mitotic parthenogenesis) or automixis with central fusion and low recombination rates. Automixis with central fusion is the cytogenetic mechanism that was recorded in other asexual ant species. Nests with multiple dealated queens are often found, suggesting that M. smithii is a polygynous species. This appears to be a case of secondary polygyny, and the queens may be daughters of the foundress.

A detailed study of many M. smithii populations across their geographic distribution range (Mexico to Argentina) showed that some M. smithii populations in the Brazilian Amazon reproduce sexually. This was demonstrated using highly variable genetic markers. Sperm was also found stored in the spermathecas of queens. Sexual reproduction was suggested as a mechanism for maintaining the genetic diversity seen in this species. In summary, M. smithii is not purely asexual, but instead consists of a "mosaic" of sexual and asexual populations. Phylogenetic reconstructions and the biology of the species suggest that these sexual populations gave rise to the asexual ones. The mechanism behind the shift to asexuality is still unknown. However, antibiotic assays and genetic screenings suggest that it is not an endosymbiont such as Wolbachia causing the asexuality. In fact, a comparative analysis showed that Wolbachia endosymbionts do not seem to cause asexuality in ants in general.

== Nest architecture ==
The nests and colonies of M. smithii were studied in great detail in Puerto Rico and Brazil. On the surface, M. smithii nests can be recognized by their nest mounds consisting of excavated soil and clay. A nest entrance of roughly 1.2 mm in diameter is located in the center of each nest mound. Large M. smithii nests, which are presumably older, can contain up to 7 or so chambers. Some fungus chambers are shallow whereas others can be found in great depths, as deep as 2 meters. The abandoned chambers are used to deposit waste from the fungus garden and loose soil from chamber construction. The number of nest chambers tends to increase as colonies grow older. Because M. smithii queens are capable of asexual reproduction, it is believed that colonies can also grow by budding in addition to independent colony foundation. Colonies that grow by budding can result in large colony networks.

Workers of M. smithii ants maintain narrow tunnels (diameter of 1.3 mm), which do not allow two ants to pass each other in the tunnel (head size is around 0.7 mm for workers and 0.9 mm for queens). The tunnels also have a number of slightly larger sections (about 3.6 mm diameter), which would allow passing while also facilitating information exchange. Narrow tunnels are presumably easier (energetically cheaper) to construct and may also aide in leveling the humidity or temperature of the colony or preventing predatory intrusions. In general, M. smithii colonies are smaller than the colonies of M. goeldii.

== Fungal cultivation ==
When founding a new colony, young queens either shed their wings prior to excavating the nest or just inside. They then excavate a tunnel to a depth of roughly 10 cm (4 in) and create a primary chamber. The dealate, or wingless, queen then carries the wings into the primary chamber and inserts them into the chamber ceiling where the surface of the wings is used as a platform for growing an incipient fungus garden. She will also forage around the nest entrance for caterpillar droppings to feed the fungus garden. The female fore wings of all so-called Paleoattini (the genera Mycocepurus, Apterostigma, and Myrmicocrypta) have a crescent-shaped spot lacking any veins, hairs, and pigmentation, and is thought to provide an "easy to clean" platform for the fungus garden. Queens of the socially parasitic species Mycocepurus castrator do not found their colonies independently, and the clear spot is absent from their wings. This indirectly supports the idea that the wing spot has a function during the early colony founding and fungus cultivation stage of independently founding Mycocepurus queens. As the colony matures, workers develop and then tend to the fungus garden, feeding it dried leaves, caterpillar droppings, and other debris from the leaf-litter.

One trait of M. smithii cultivation is that, unlike higher attines, they use a wide diversity of fungal lineages for their gardens. Lineages of M. smithii have undergone many cultivar shifts over time. This tendency to shift cultivars is hypothesized to be a mechanism for helping to offset some of the costs of asexuality. Also unlike other fungus-growing ants M. smithii has a microbiome that is distinct from the surrounding soil. A Brazilian population of M. smithii has a fungal cultivar with gongylidia-like structures. This is unusual, because gongylidia are the nutrient rich food bodies produced by the fungi of leaf-cutting ants – and leaf-cutting ants are rather distant relatives of Mycocepurus.
