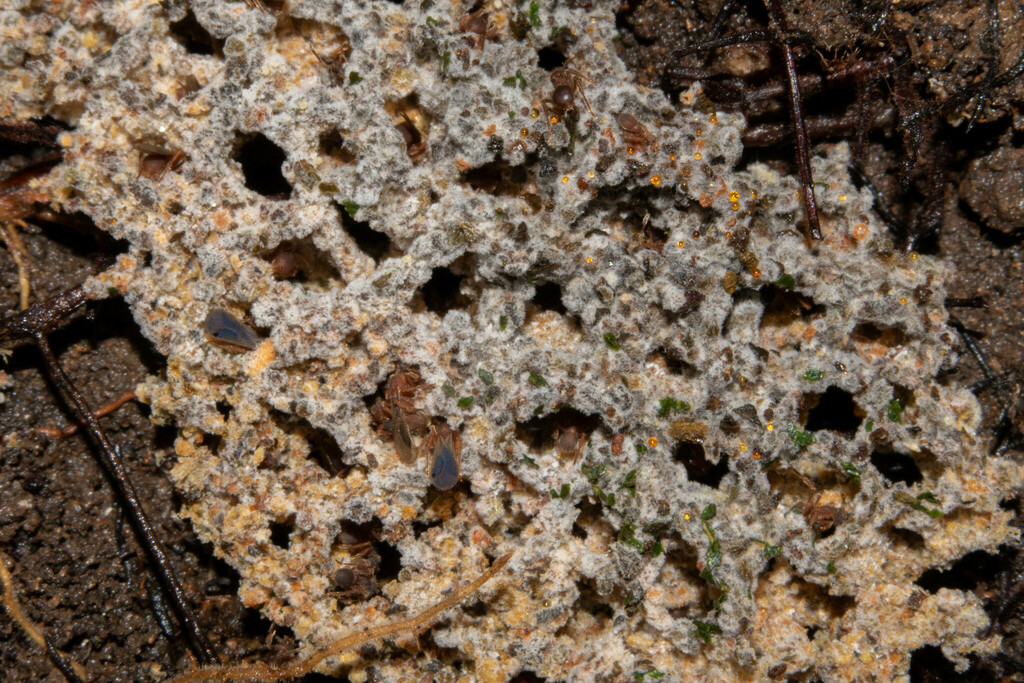

Scientific classification
- Kingdom: Fungi
- Division: Basidiomycota
- Class: Agaricomycetes
- Order: Agaricales
- Family: Pterulaceae
- Genus: Myrmecopterula
- Species: M. nudihortorum

Binomial name
- Myrmecopterula nudihortorum (Dentinger) Leal-Dutra, Dentinger & G.W. Griff (2020)

Synonyms
- Pterula nudihortorum Dentinger (2014)

= Myrmecopterula nudihortorum =

Species of fungus

Myrmecopterula nudihortorum is a species of fungus in the family Pterulaceae. It is associated with fungi cultivating ants of the genus Apterostigma.

== Taxonomy ==
M. nudihortorum was originally classified as Pterula nudihortorum by the American mycologist Bryn Tjader Mason Dentinger in 2014. Before being formally classified it was referred to in studies on fungus growing ants as ant cultivar G4 and was found in ant nests belonging to the Apterostigma manni subclade.

It was placed in the new genus Myrmecopterula by the mycologists Caio A. Leal-Dutra, Bryn Tjader Mason Dentinger and Gareth W. Griffith in 2020.

== Description ==
Unlike M. velohortorum (G2) which is cultivated in veiled hanging gardens, M. nudihortorum is cultivated in spongelike masses on the bottom of the garden cavity either under logs or in cavities excavated in the ground. The garden is not enveloped in or suspended by a woven veil. This nest building behaviour is more similar to that of lower attine ants which engage in cultivation of Lepiotaceous fungi belonging to the G3 group. However, only one species of Apterostigma, Apterostigma auriculatum was documented as cultivating the G3 fungus.

== Similar species ==
Myrmecopterula moniliformis and Myrmecopterula velohortorum are the only other named species belonging to the genus Myrmecopterula. These are also associated with cultivation by Apterostigma ants. Four other unnamed and poorly documented Myrmecopterula species are known.
