= Myrmecopterula velohortorum =

Scientific classification
- Kingdom: Fungi
- Division: Basidiomycota
- Class: Agaricomycetes
- Order: Agaricales
- Family: Pterulaceae
- Genus: Myrmecopterula
- Species: M. velohortorum

Binomial name
- Myrmecopterula velohortorum (Dentinger) Leal-Dutra, Dentinger & G.W. Griff (2020)

Synonyms
- Pterula velohortorum Dentinger (2014)

Species of fungus

Myrmecopterula velohortorum is a species of fungus in the family Pterulaceae. It is associated with fungi cultivating ants of the genus Apterostigma.

== Taxonomy ==
M. velohortorum was originally classified as Pterula velohortorum by the American mycologist Bryn Tjader Mason Dentinger in 2014. Before being formally classified it was referred to in studies on fungus growing ants as ant cultivar G2 and was found in ant nests belonging to the Apterostigma dentigerum subclade.

It was placed in the new genus Myrmecopterula by the mycologists Caio A. Leal-Dutra, Bryn Tjader Mason Dentinger and Gareth W. Griffith in 2020.

== Description ==
M. velohortorum is cultivated in hanging 'veiled gardens' where the mycelium forms a thin envelope which surrounds the fungal garden. Gardens are found hanging under logs or inside cavities within them or rarely found in cavities in the ground. A single hole may exist in the veil serving as the entrance to the nest. It is hypothesized that M. velohortorum descended from M. nudihortorum with the two species then taking different evolutionary paths due to co-evolving with ants engaged in varying behaviors. Such as the weaving of mycelial threads to produce the veil which the ants are hypothesized to engage in.

== Similar species ==
Myrmecopterula moniliformis and Myrmecopterula nudihortorum are the only other named species belonging to the genus Myrmecopterula. These are also associated with cultivation by Apterostigma ants. Four other unnamed and poorly documented Myrmecopterula species are known.
