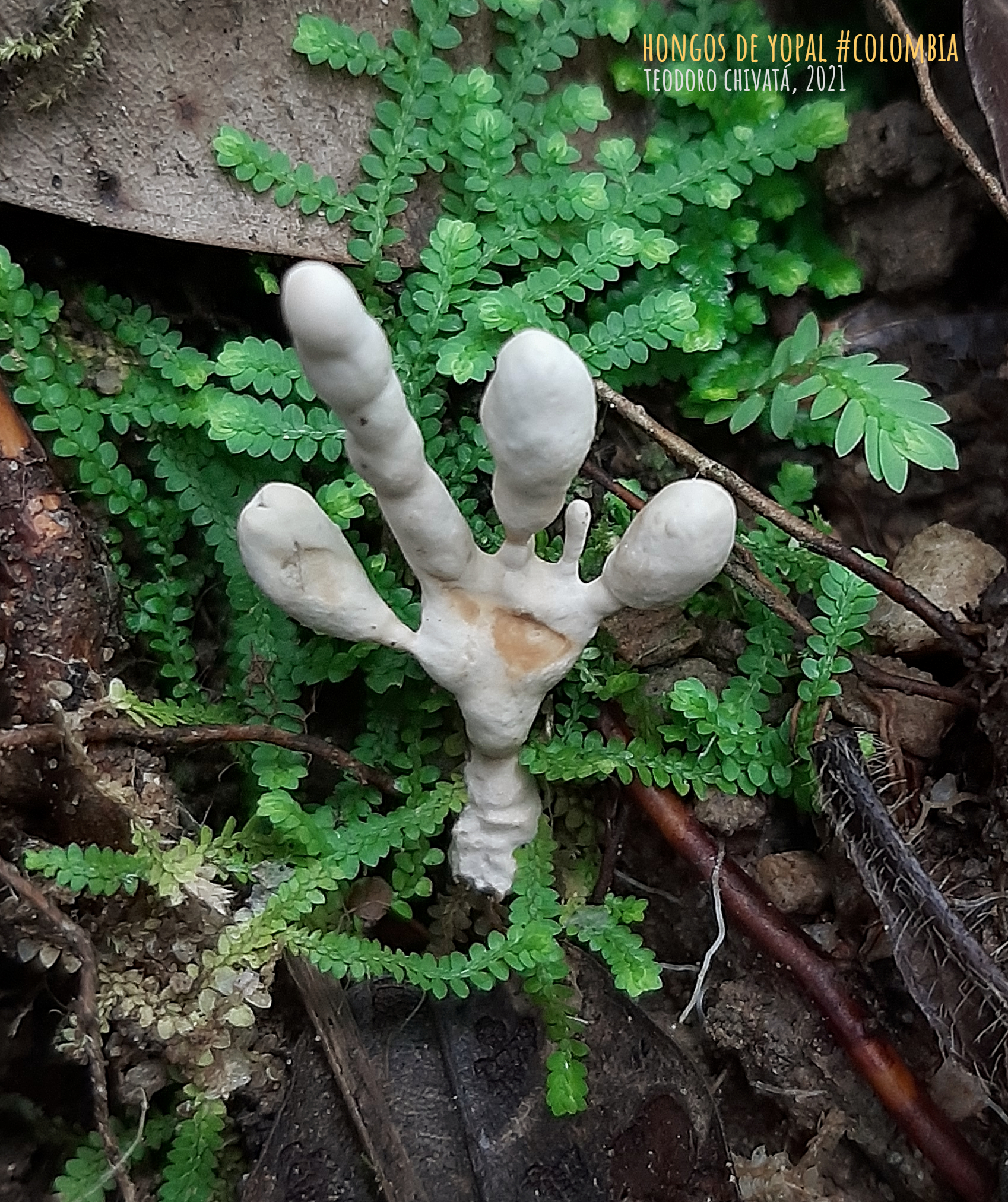
- Myrmecopterula moniliformis with infertile bead like fruiting bodies

Scientific classification
- Kingdom: Fungi
- Division: Basidiomycota
- Class: Agaricomycetes
- Order: Agaricales
- Family: Pterulaceae
- Genus: Myrmecopterula
- Species: M. moniliformis

Binomial name
- Myrmecopterula moniliformis (Henn.) Leal-Dutra, Dentinger & G.W. Griff (2020)

Synonyms
- Lachnocladium moniliforme Henn. (1904); Pterula moniliformis Corner (1952); Thelephora clavarioides Torrend (1914)

= Myrmecopterula moniliformis =

Species of fungus

Myrmecopterula moniliformis is a species of fungus in the family Pterulaceae and is the type species of the genus Myrmecopterula. It is associated with fungi cultivating ants of the genus Apterostigma.

== Taxonomy ==
M. moniliformis was originally classified as Lachnocladium moniliforme by the German mycologist Paul Christoph Hennings in 1904. It was classified as Thelephora clavarioides by the Portuguese mycologist Camille Torrend in 1914. It was reclassified as Pterula moniliformis by the English mycologist Edred John Henry Corner in 1952.

The genus Myrmecopterula was created in 2020 by the mycologists Leal-Dutra, Bryn Tjader Mason Dentinger & G.W. Griff when a major new reclassification took place of the Pterulaceae family based on phylogenetic analysis.

== Description ==
M. moniliformis produces two distinct forms of mushrooms. The first type resemble irregular strings of beads similar in appearance to some rhizomes produced by plants. These are sterile and lack an active hymenium to produce spores. The second type are fertile branching coral structures which are more typical of mushrooms produced by other species in the Pterulaceae family. These forms may grow separately or together with fertile coral forms branching off from the infertile beads. The presence of fertile mushrooms means that M. moniliformis is capable of reproducing and surviving without the ants which separates it from the other two named species in this genus M. nudihortorum and M. velohortorum which appear to be reliant on ant domestication and have not been documented as producing fertile fruiting bodies.

One hypothesis for the presence of fertile fruiting bodies in M. moniliformis is that it may have descended from a lineage of ant-domesticated fungi which escaped from cultivation to become free-living fungi. The presence of the sterile mushrooms may be a genetic relic from previous cultivation as this mutation is detrimental to non-domesticated fungi.

== Etymology ==
Myrmecopterula is derived from the Greek Myrmex meaning ant as in Myrmecology, the study of ants. Monile is Latin for necklace and liformis is a Latin suffix for shape or form so 'necklace shaped'. This is a reference to the bead like shapes formed by the infertile fruiting bodies.

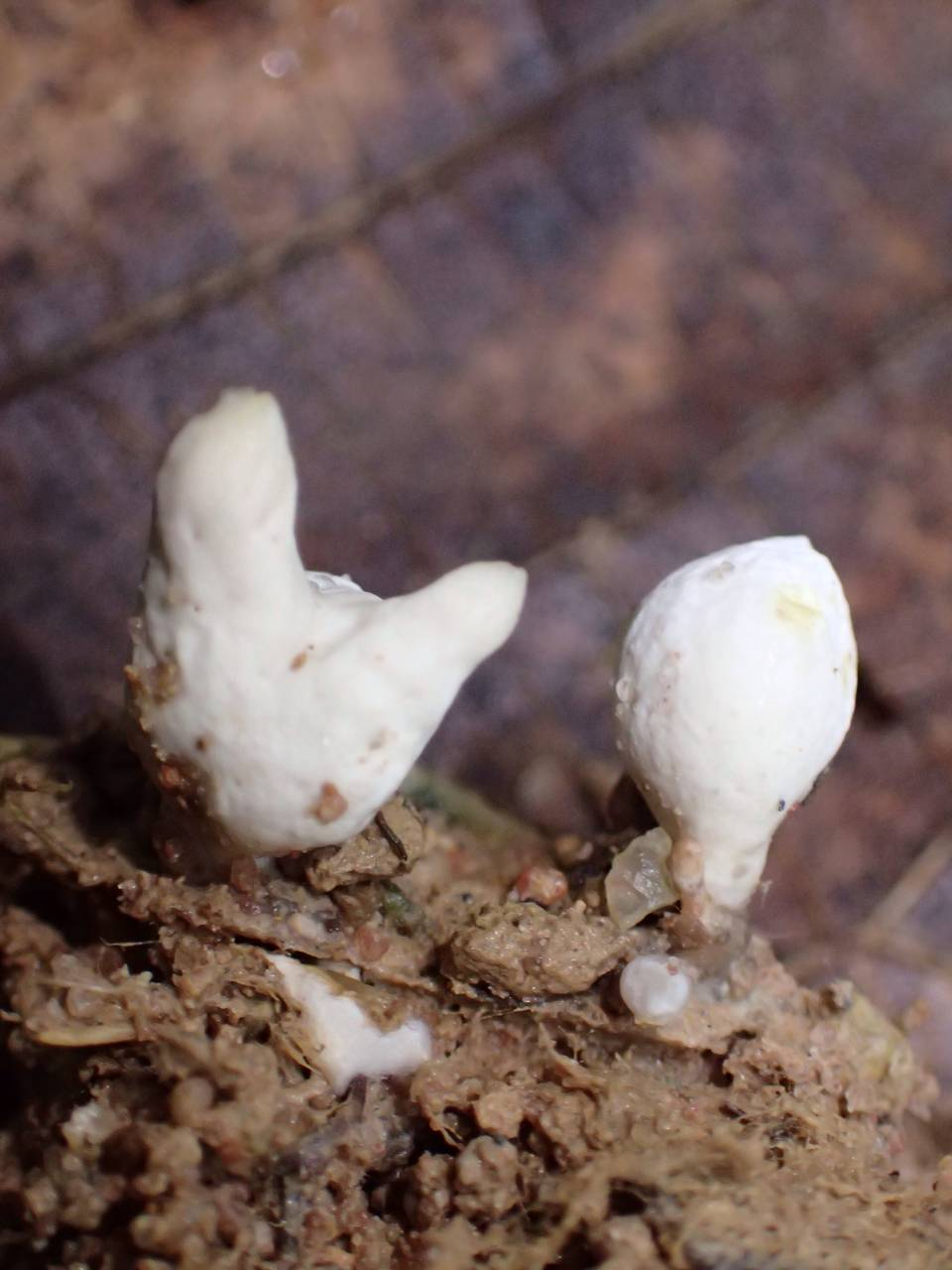
Myrmecopterula moniliformis with small, sterile bead like mushrooms

== Similar species ==
Myrmecopterula nudihortorum and Myrmecopterula velohortorum are the only other named species belonging to the genus Myrmecopterula.These are also associated with cultivation by Apterostigma ants. Four other unnamed and poorly documented Myrmecopterula species are known.

== Habitat and distribution ==
Myrmecopterula species are found in the neotropics of South America and are usually found growing on top of living or dead ant nests or being cultivated by ants.

Some species of Myrmecopterula grow from soil whilst others appear to grow from wood however closer inspection reveals that rather than using the wood itself as a substrate they are instead found growing from loose debris within cavities in the wood. This substrate is sometimes similar in appearance to that of the fungal gardens of Apterostigma pilosum group ants, which have been documented cultivating Myrmecopterula species.

M. moniliformis is documented as growing from soil but has also been observed emerging from active and inactive ant nests. It is hypothesized that this species may be involved in residual decomposition of substrates in abandoned ant nests or even act as a mycoparasite of the cultivated fungus.

The Apterostigma pilosum species itself has a distribution that covers parts of South America, Central America and Mexico this helps to understand the potential distribution of Myrmecopterula species. Due to some species of this genus being reliant upon ants and not producing mushrooms, observations are uncommon and would depend on observing the nests themselves. However, as M. moniliformis produces both fertile and infertile mushrooms and can grow without the ants observations of fruiting bodies can be made which place the distribution around Peru, Brazil, Colombia, Costa Rica and Bolivia
