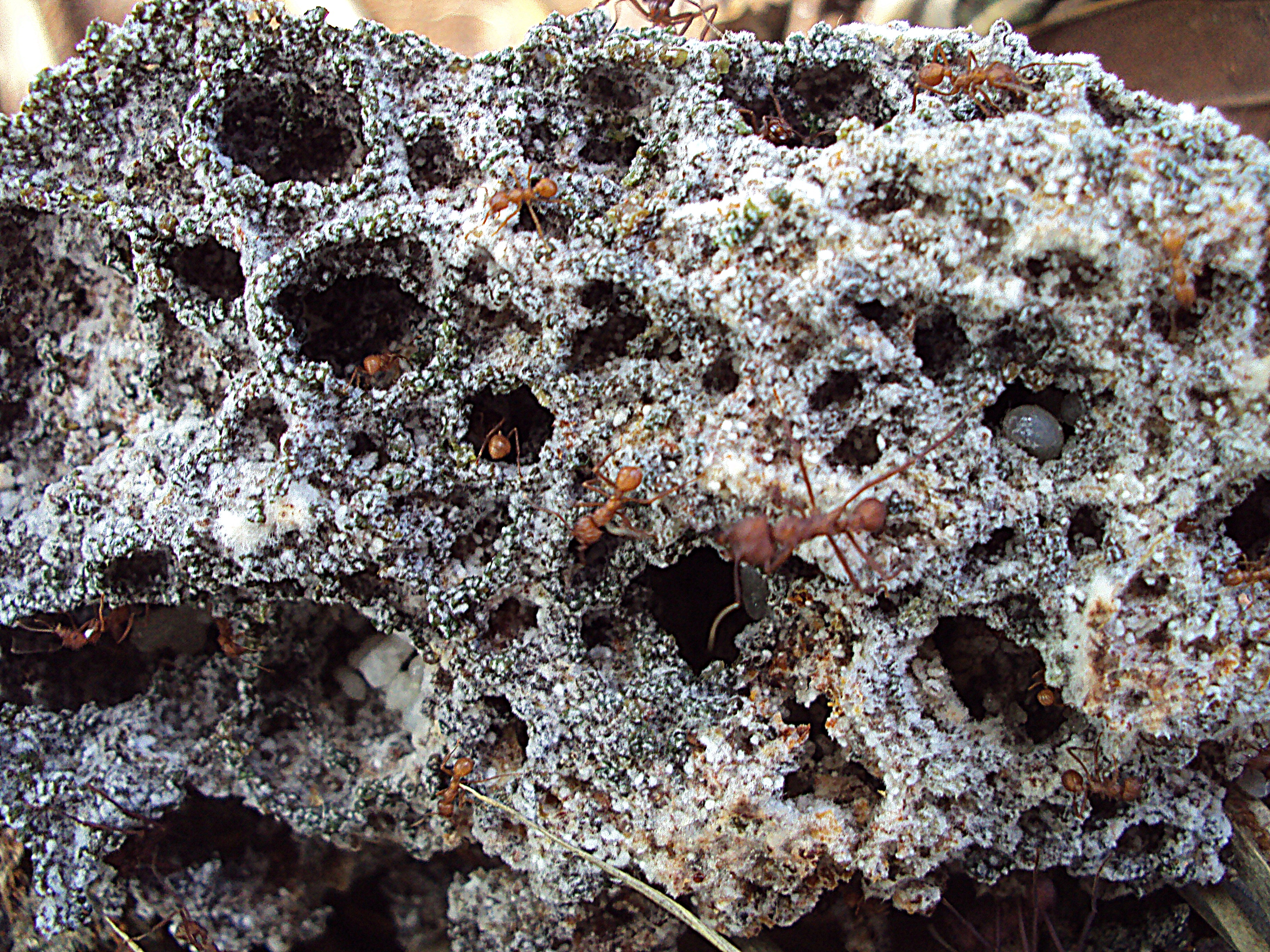

Scientific classification
- Kingdom: Fungi
- Division: Basidiomycota
- Class: Agaricomycetes
- Order: Agaricales
- Family: Agaricaceae
- Genus: Leucocoprinus
- Species: L. gongylophorus

Binomial name
- Leucocoprinus gongylophorus (Alfred Möller) Heim (1957)

Synonyms
- Rozites gongylophorus Möller (1893); Pholiota gongylophora Sacc. (1895); Leucoagaricus gongylophorus (R.Heim) Singer (1986); Attamyces bromatificus Kreisel (1972)

= Leucocoprinus gongylophorus =

Species of fungus

Leucocoprinus gongylophorus is a fungus in the family Agaricaceae which is cultivated by certain leafcutter ants. Like other species of fungi cultivated by ants, L. gongylophorus produces gongylidia, nutrient-rich hyphal swellings upon which the ants feed. Production of mushrooms occurs only once ants abandon the nest. L. gongylophorus is farmed by leaf cutter ant species belonging to the genera Atta and Acromyrmex, amongst others.

== Description ==
L. gongylophorus is completely dependent on ants for survival with workers feeding it cut plant matter and new queens carrying a piece of mycelium in their infrabuccal pocket (a specialised structure within the mouth) in order to found a new colony. For both its source of nutrition and mechanism of spreading it is reliant on the ants. The species has co-evolved with ants so thoroughly that it can no longer rely upon producing mushrooms to emit spores as a viable survival mechanism as it has lost the ability to produce sexual spores. The mutualistic relationship also includes a third species as Pseudonocardia bacteria coat the exoskeleton of the ants and produce antibiotics which protect the fungal garden from mycoparasitic microfungi like members of the Escovopsis genus. Without this antibiotic production the L. gongylophorus fungi on which the ants rely could be destroyed and take the whole nest with it. Leafcutter ant species may exhibit specially modified exoskeletons better capable of housing beneficial bacteria with which the fungal garden is inoculated as the ants tend to it. A fourth hypothesized beneficial symbiont exists in the form of Phialophora black yeast which grow on the cuticle of the ants and which may fulfill a beneficial saprophytic role. Including the parasitic Escovopsis microfungi or micromycetes this means a leafcutter ant colony may in fact be a symbiotic relationship between five species. The fungal lineage of L. gongylophorus may have been continually propagated for over 23 million years which helps explain why it is now entirely reliant on the ants.

L. gongylophorus produces a diverse array of enzymes to facilitate lignocellulose degradation in ant gardens. As leafcutter ants can have such a profound effect on their environment and account for about 25% of plant consumption in their forest ecosystems this means L. gongylophorus may be the primary driver of plant biomass degradation in this ecosystem. The sheer scale of the ants' farming can see 10-15% of leaves in a colony's foraging range being cut and fed to the fungi which results in significant carbon dioxide emissions from L. gongylophorus as this plant biomass is broken down. Nest openings can have CO_{2} emissions 100,000 times greater than the surrounding soils with nests and their surrounding soil emitting 15-60% more CO_{2} than soil without nests. Emissions were observable for more than two years after nests were abandoned with nests contributing an estimated total of 0.2-0.7% of the ecosystem's soil emissions. Due to the enhanced rate of breakdown of the plant biomass facilitated by the fungus compared to the slower natural degradation of leaves that fall on the surface, leafcutter ants and their symbiotic fungi partners may play a surprisingly significant role in the ecosystem's ability to sequester carbon.

This species has become so dependent on the ants to survive that the production of mature fruiting bodies is not often recorded. In the wild it is heavily suppressed by the ants due to their harvesting of the immature mushrooms. In Møller's 1893 study he described the mushrooms of Rozites gongylophorus growing from a nest removed from the wild as follows:

Cap: Up to 16 cm in diameter. Stem and cap: Up to 24 cm in height. Stem: Up to 4 cm diameter at the base and 2 cm at the annulus. Spore print: Tinted with a clear ochre colour (possibly due to discolouration with age since Leucoagaricus species typically have white spores).

In the 1977 publication Studies on Fungi Cultivated by Ants attempts were made to culture 37 fungi samples obtained from the nests of various fungus farming ants. This study succeeded in producing mushrooms on an oatmeal medium from samples acquired from the nests of Myrmicocrypta buenzlii, Mycetophylax conformis, Cyphomyrmex costatus and Apterostigma auriculatum which were described as appearing similar to Møller's observation. However whilst these lower attine ants do farm other Leucocoprinus species, they do not farm the highly specialised L. gongylophorus. The cultures taken from Atta and Acromyrmex nests either produced gongylidia or only mycelium.

Later studies have observed mushrooms from Atta and Acromyrmex nests growing in the lab or in wild nests during excavations.

== Taxonomy ==
Originally classified as Rozites gongylophorus by the German botanist and mycologist Friedrich Alfred Gustav Jobst Møller in 1893 who described it as an ant fungus associated with Atta discigera (since reclassified as Acromyrmex disciger) leafcutter ants in Brazil.

It was reclassified as Leucocoprinus gongylophorus by French mycologist Roger Heim in 1957. Heim obtained samples of sterile ant fungi from French Guiana and Panama from Atta ant species which were compared with illustrations and descriptions of an ant fungus obtained from Cyphomyrmex costatus ants in Trinidad. Based on this study the fungus was transferred to the Leucocoprinus genus. It was later transferred to Leucoagaricus by the German mycologist Rolf Singer in 1986. More recent studies based upon DNA sequence data fail to differentiate the genera Leucoagaricus and Leucocoprinus. Consequently, the type of Leucoagaricus was transferred to Leucocoprinus and Leucoagaricus becomes a synonym of Leucocoprinus, the older of the two generic names. As a result, the name Leucocoprinus gongylophorus becomes the correct name.

It was also classified as Pholiota gongylophora by Italian botanist and mycologist Pier Andrea Saccardo in 1895 and Attamyces bromatificus by German mycologist Hanns Kreisel in 1972 however these species were merged with L. gongylophorus. Attamyces was a monotypic genus described by Kreisel after he found the fungus fruiting on the nest of the fungus-growing ants Atta insularis in Cuba. The specific epithet bromatificus refers to bromatia, which are swollen tips on the hyphae that the ants use as food. Bromatia are also called gongylidia with 'bromatia' seldom used in modern descriptions so this word could now be considered archaic.

== Etymology ==
Leucocoprinus gets its name from the Greek Leuco meaning white or bright and the Latin or Greek Coprinus refers to its look-alike genus Coprinus. Gongylophorus derives from the Greek gongylo meaning rounded and Greek phorus meaning bearing or carrying.

== Similar species ==
Termitomyces is a genus of mushrooms also belonging to the order Agaricales which is cultivated by various species belonging to the subfamily of termites, Macrotermitinae. Whilst not immediately related to species cultivated by leafcutter ants they are noteworthy as another insect-fungus partnership.

Myrmecopterula is a genus of coral fungi belonging to the order Agaricales which is cultivated by Apterostigma ants.

== See also ==
- List of Leucoagaricus species
