= Escovopsis aspergilloides =

Scientific classification
- Kingdom: Fungi
- Division: Ascomycota
- Class: Sordariomycetes
- Order: Hypocreales
- Family: Hypocreaceae
- Genus: Escovopsis
- Species: E. aspergilloides

Binomial name
- Escovopsis aspergilloides Seifert, Samson & Chapela (1995)

Species of fungus

Escovopsis aspergilloides is a species of fungus that was rediscovered in 1995 by mycologists Keith A. Seifert, Robert A. Samson and Ignacio Chapela. Escovopsis aspergilloides co-exist in a symbiotic relationship with attini ants - fungus-growing ants. The highly evolved, ancient ant-fungus mutualism has become a model system in the study of symbiosis. In spite of this, the genus Escovopsis was not proposed until 1990 and the first two species were not formally described until the 1990s: E. weberi by Muchovej and Della Lucia in 1990 E. aspergilloides by Seifert, Samson and Chapela in 1995.

== Discovery ==
E. aspergilloides was first discovered in 1893 by Alfred Moeller (Möller) in Blumenau on the island of Santa Catharina, Brazil - home of the German expatriate and naturalist, Fritz Müller - whose biography Moeller wrote. Alfred Moeller was undertaking a detailed study of local fungi for the Berlin Academy. His two-year field work in 1890 and 1891 resulted in his elaborate publication about attine ants and fungus entitled "The mushroom garden of some South American ants" about several fungus species in ant gardens.

== Ant-fungus mutualism ==
There are 257 species of ants that constitute the tribe Attini. These leaf-cutting ants and fungus survive in an ant–fungus mutualism - an obligate symbiosis - in which neither can exist without the other. Ants grow the fungus - the basidiomycete cultivar - propagating it, nurturing and defending it - the fungus becomes almost their sole source of food.

== Rediscovery and taxonomy ==
In 1995 Seifert, Samson and Chapela isolated Escovopsis aspergilloides from nests of the Trachymyrmex ruthae - an ant species originally from Trinidad. E. aspergilloides differs from other species in Escovopsis weberi by its "globose vesicles and narrow, ellipsoidal conidia."

American entomologist and myrmecologist Neal A. Weber began publishing his research on ants in 1934 continued to investigate the relationship between ants and fungus gardens for 35 years. Little had been published in the twentieth century about the species Escovopsis and ant gardens prior to his 1966 article "Fungus-growing ants" in the journal Science. Weber pioneered culture methods needed to distinguish the different species of fungus harboured by ants. In 1972 H. Z. Kreisel recognized one of Moeller's unnamed anamorphic fungi in his own research on the leaf-cutting ant Atta insularis and described it as a new genus and species – Phialocladus zsoltii but did not formally describe the genus and the species. In 1990 Muchovej and Della Lucia rediscovered the same fungus and – noting Kreisel's omission – renamed the genus Escovopsis and the species E. weberi in honour of Weber's work.

Three more species of Escovopsis were isolated from ant nests in Brazil by 2015, including Escovopsis moelleri, Escovopsis microspora and Escovopsis lentecrescens.

== See also ==
- Aspergillosis
