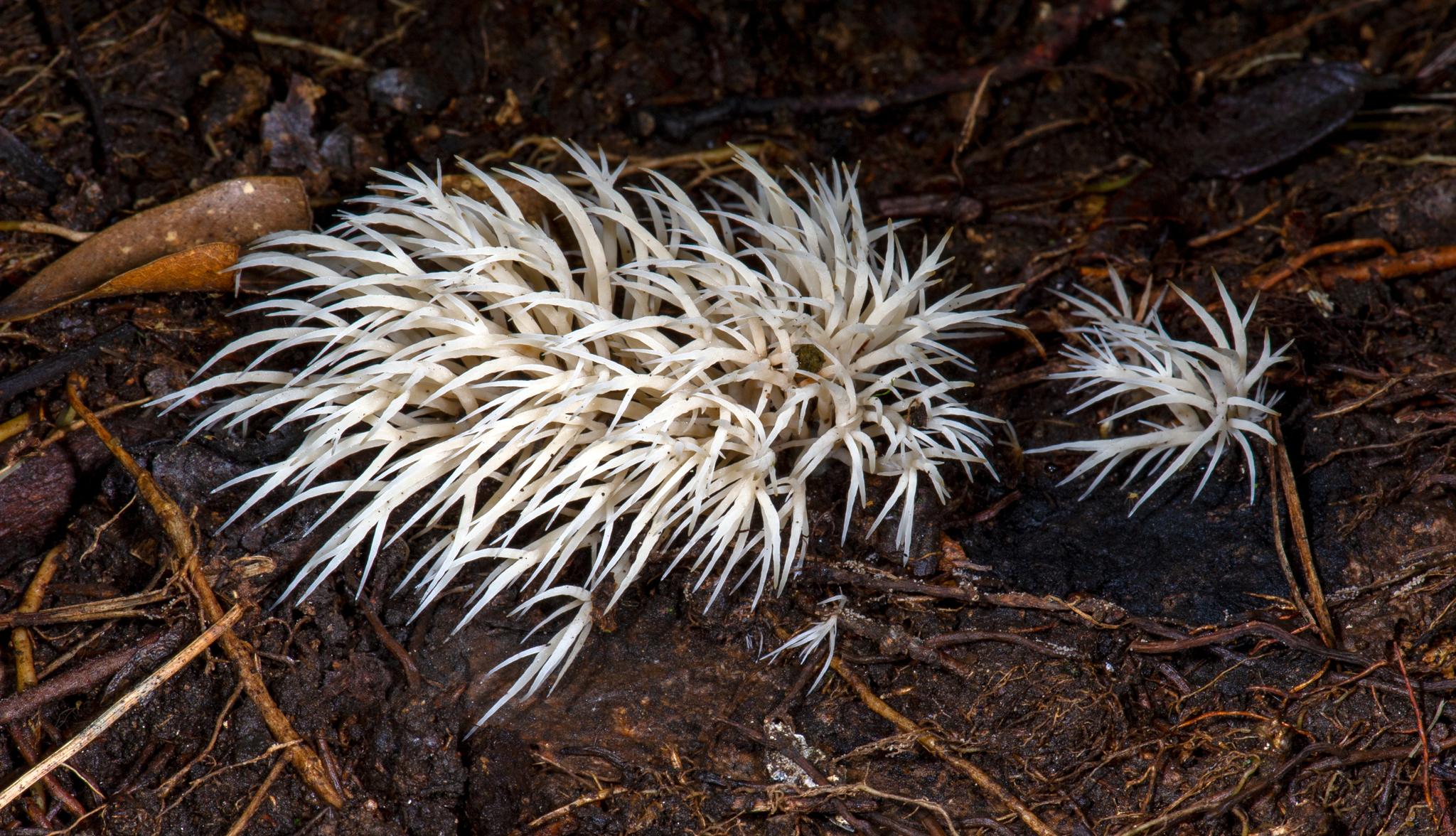

Scientific classification
- Kingdom: Fungi
- Division: Basidiomycota
- Class: Agaricomycetes
- Order: Agaricales
- Family: Pterulaceae
- Genus: Pterulicium; Corner

Type species
- Pterulicium xylogenum (Berk. & Broome) Corner

= Pterulicium =

Genus of fungi

Pterulicium is a genus of fungi in the Pterulaceae family. The genus was previously monotypic, containing the single species Pterulicium xylogenum, found in southeast Asia. However in 2020 a major reclassification of the Pterulaceae family occurred based on phylogenetic analysis and the Pterula genus was split into Pterula, Myrmecopterula, Pterulicium and Phaeopterula by the mycologists Caio A. Leal-Dutra, Bryn Tjader Mason Dentinger and Gareth W. Griffith.

== Species ==
As of July 2022, Species Fungorum accepted 42 species of Pterulicum.

1. Pterulicium argentinum
2. Pterulicium bambusae
3. Pterulicium bromeliphilum
4. Pterulicium brunneosetosum
5. Pterulicium campoi
6. Pterulicium caricis-pendulae
7. Pterulicium crassisporum
8. Pterulicium cystidiatum
9. Pterulicium debile
10. Pterulicium echo
11. Pterulicium epiphylloides
12. Pterulicium epiphyllum
13. Pterulicium fasciculare
14. Pterulicium fluminense
15. Pterulicium gordium
16. Pterulicium gracile
17. Pterulicium incarnatum
18. Pterulicium intermedium
19. Pterulicium laxum
20. Pterulicium lilaceobrunneum
21. Pterulicium longisporum
22. Pterulicium macrosporum
23. Pterulicium majus
24. Pterulicium mangiforme
25. Pterulicium microsporum
26. Pterulicium nanum
27. Pterulicium naviculum
28. Pterulicium oryzae
29. Pterulicium phyllodicola
30. Pterulicium phyllophilum
31. Pterulicium rigidum
32. Pterulicium sclerotiicola
33. Pterulicium secundirameum
34. Pterulicium sprucei
35. Pterulicium subsimplex
36. Pterulicium subtyphuloides
37. Pterulicium sulcisporum
38. Pterulicium tenuissimum
39. Pterulicium typhuloides
40. Pterulicium ulmi
41. Pterulicium velutipes
42. Pterulicium xylogenum
