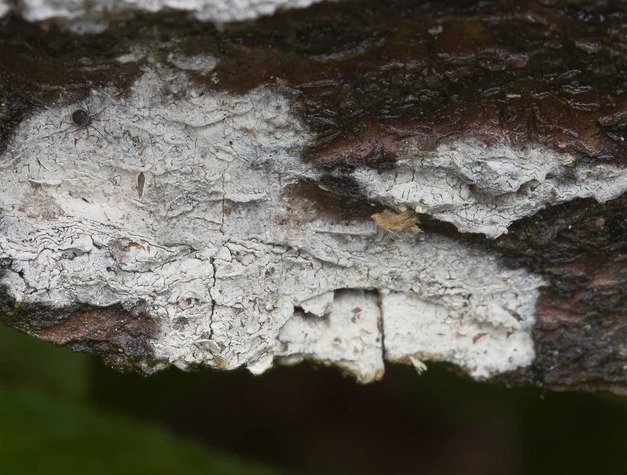
- Coronicium alboglaucum

Scientific classification
- Domain: Eukaryota
- Kingdom: Fungi
- Division: Basidiomycota
- Class: Agaricomycetes
- Order: Agaricales
- Family: Pterulaceae
- Genus: Coronicium; J. Erikss. & Ryvarden

Type species
- Corticium gemmiferum Bourdot & Galzin

Species
- C. alboglaucum C. gemmiferum C. molokaiense C. proximum C. thymicola

= Coronicium =

Genus of fungi

Coronicium is a genus of fungi in the Pterulaceae family. The genus has a widespread distribution in north temperate areas, and contains five species: C. alboglaucum, C. gemmiferum, C. molokaiense, C. proximum, C. thymicola.

== Species ==
As of October 2022, Species Fungorum accepted five species of Coronicium.

- Coronicium alboglaucum
- Coronicium gemmiferum
- Coronicium molokaiense
- Coronicium proximum
- Coronicium thymicola
