= Apterostigma electropilosum =

Apterostigma electropilosum Temporal range: Lutetian

Scientific classification
- Domain: Eukaryota
- Kingdom: Animalia
- Phylum: Arthropoda
- Class: Insecta
- Order: Hymenoptera
- Family: Formicidae
- Subfamily: Myrmicinae
- Genus: Apterostigma
- Species: A. electropilosum

Binomial name
- Apterostigma electropilosum Schultz, 2007

Extinct species of ant

Apterostigma electropilosum is an extinct species of ant in the subfamily Myrmicinae known from a single possibly Miocene fossil found on Hispaniola. A. electropilosum is one of only two species of the ant genus Apterostigma and one of five Attine species to have been described from fossils found in Dominican amber.

== History and classification ==
Apterostigma electropilosum is known from a solitary fossil insect which is an inclusion in a transparent chunk of Dominican amber. The amber was produced by the extinct Hymenaea protera, which formerly grew on Hispaniola, across northern South America and up to southern Mexico. The specimens were collected from an undetermined amber mine in fossil bearing rocks of the Cordillera Septentrional mountains, northern Dominican Republic. The amber dates from at least the Burdigalian stage of the Miocene, based on studying the associated fossil foraminifera and may be as old as the Middle Eocene, based on the associated fossil coccoliths. This age range is due to the host rock being secondary deposits for the amber, and the Miocene the age range is only the youngest that it might be.

The holotype amber specimen, number DR-14-984, is currently preserved in the amber collections of the US National Museum, and is labeled as part of the Smithsonian Institution ant database as number 00443127. The fossil was first studied by entomologist Ted R. Schultz of the National Museum of Natural History with his 2007 type description of the new species being published in the journal Memoirs of the American Entomological Institute. The specific epithet electropilosum is a combination of the Latin electrum meaning "amber" and pilosum, the Apterostigma species group which A. electropilosum it part of.

Prior to the species formal description in 2007, no Apterostigma species were known from the fossil record, however three other Attini species were already known from Dominican Amber, Trachymyrmex primaevus, Cyphomyrmex maya, and Cyphomyrmex taino. Schultz's paper described a second Dominican amber Apterostigma species, A. eowilsoni. Bringing the total Attini fossil record to five species.

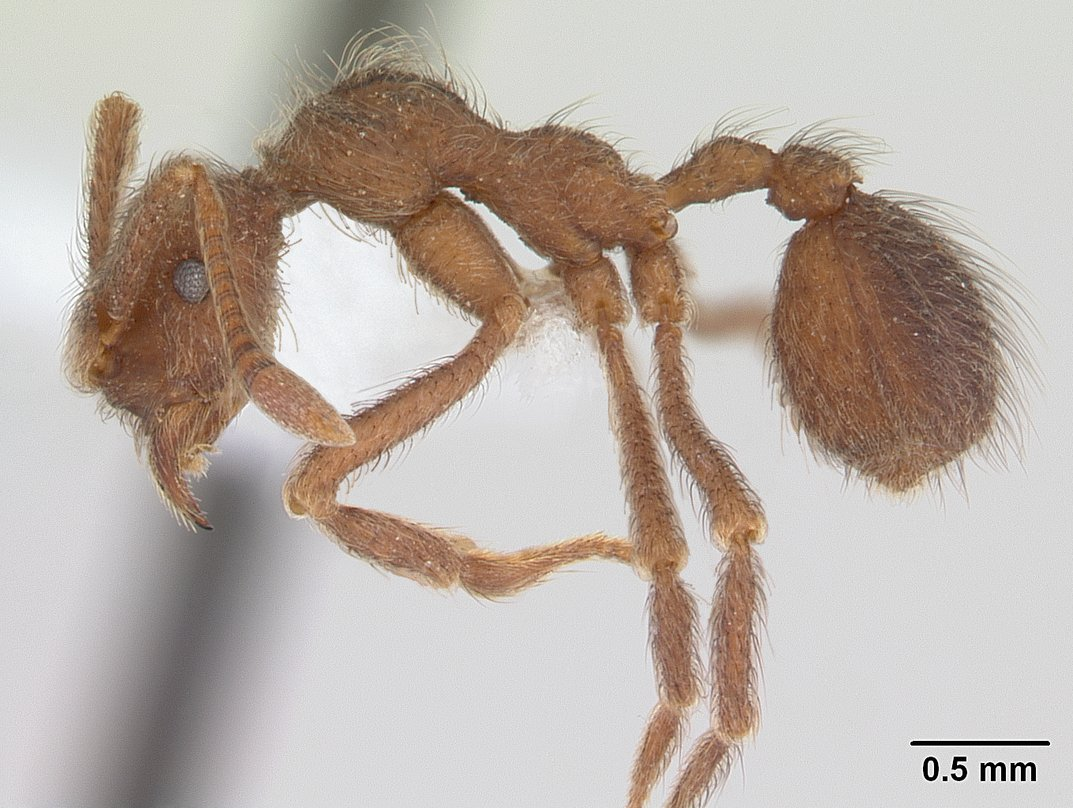
Apterostigma pilosum worker

== Description ==
The Apterostigma electropilosum specimen is well preserved with an estimated Weber's length of 1.37 millimetres (0.054 in) and a head length of 1.06 millimetres (0.042 in). The overall coloration of the species is hard to determine due to a sporadic microscopic coating of fine bubbles, possibly of oil or other liquid from punctures in the integument after entombment by the resin. The body has a fine covering of simple upright setae which reach a total length of 0.15 millimetres (0.0059 in). The head capsule shows a clypeus which is smooth and shiny, a feature seen in the living pilosum group of Apterostigma species. The occiput, rear area of the head capsule, is elongated to a slight neck with a smooth integument surface. The antennae are composed of eleven segments, in which the tip segment is 2.5 times the length of the next segment. The eyes are rounded and bulbous in structure with a circumference of ten ommatidia. While the clypeus structure places A. electropilosum in the pilosum group, the combination of rounded frontal head capsule lobes, mandibles with eleven teeth, and the angle of clypeus border is not seen in any extant species.
