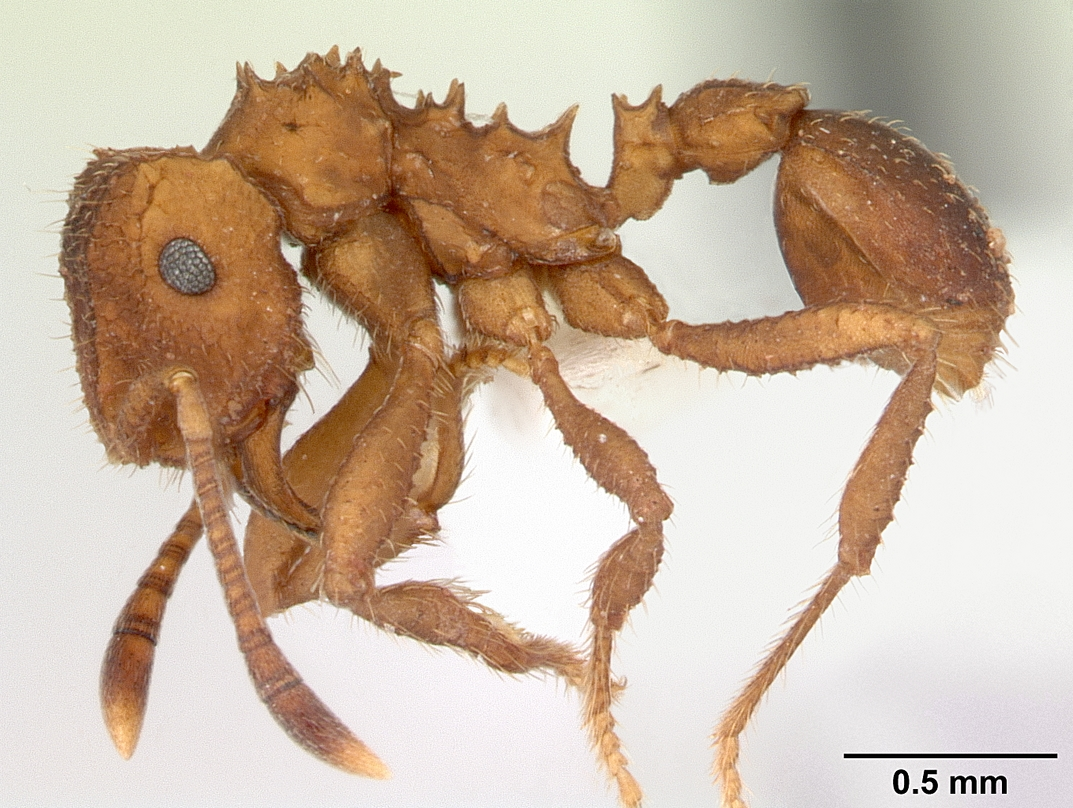
- Mycocepurus goeldii worker

Scientific classification
- Kingdom: Animalia
- Phylum: Arthropoda
- Clade: Pancrustacea
- Class: Insecta
- Order: Hymenoptera
- Family: Formicidae
- Subfamily: Myrmicinae
- Tribe: Attini
- Genus: Mycocepurus; Forel, 1893

Type species
- Atta smithii Forel, 1893

Diversity
- 6 species

Synonyms
- Descolemyrma Kusnezov, 1951

= Mycocepurus =

Genus of ants

Mycocepurus is a Neotropical genus of fungus-growing ants (tribe Attini) in the subfamily Myrmicinae. The genus is known from Mexico, south to Brazil and Argentina. Like other attines, they primarily grow fungi of the tribe Leucocoprini (family Agaricaceae). They use many different substrates for growing their fungi, from dry leaves and caterpillar dung to fruit matter. One of its species, Mycocepurus smithii, which lives in South America, reproduces by cloning – all ants in a colony are clones of the queen. M. castrator is a parasite of M. goeldii.

== Species ==
- Mycocepurus castrator Rabeling & Bacci, 2010
- Mycocepurus curvispinosus MacKay 1998
- Mycocepurus goeldii (Forel, 1893)
- Mycocepurus obsoletus Emery, 1913
- Mycocepurus smithii (Forel, 1893)
- Mycocepurus tardus Weber, 1940
