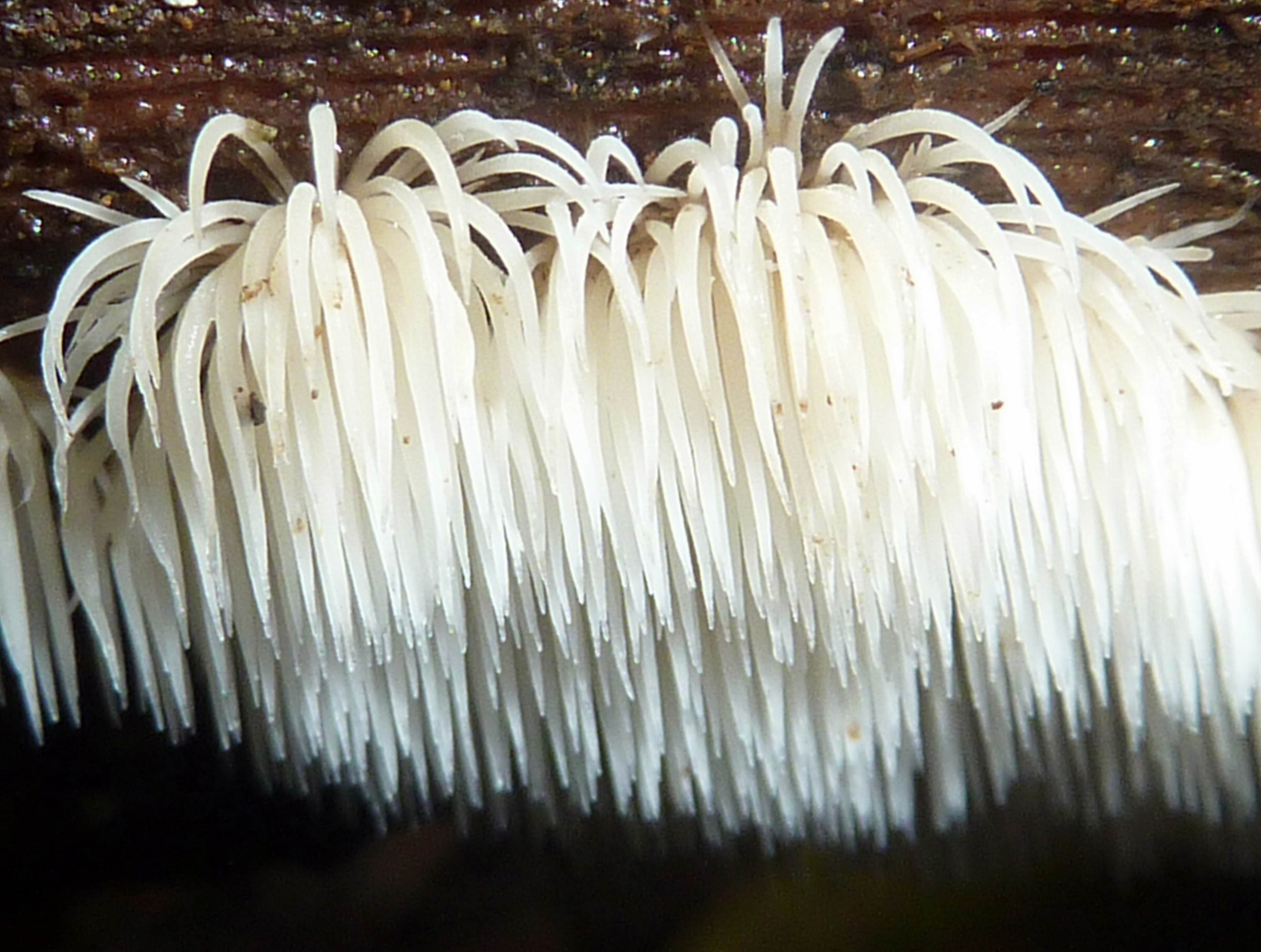
- Deflexula subsimplex

Scientific classification
- Kingdom: Fungi
- Division: Basidiomycota
- Class: Agaricomycetes
- Order: Agaricales
- Family: Pterulaceae
- Genus: Deflexula; Corner (1950)

Type species
- Deflexula fascicularis (Bres. & Pat.) Corner (1950)

= Deflexula =

Genus of fungi

Deflexula is a genus of tooth fungi in the family Pterulaceae.

== Taxonomy ==
The genus was circumscribed by British botanist E.J.H. Corner in his 1950 work "Clavaria and Allied Genera". The type species, Deflexula fascicularis, was originally described in 1901 as Pterula fascicularis by Giacomo Bresadola and Narcisse Théophile Patouillard.

Deflexula was merged with Pterulicium in 2020 and is now an inactive taxon.

== Description ==
The fruit bodies are small, up to 25 mm long. Spores are white in deposit, smooth, spherical to ellipsoidal, with large oil droplets (guttules). The basidia are large and four-spored; cystidia are absent. The hyphal system is dimitic, and the skeletal hyphae have clamp connections.

== Species ==
- Deflexula fascicularis
- Deflexula lilaceobrunnea
- Deflexula major
- Deflexula mangiformis
- Deflexula microspora
- Deflexula pacifica
- Deflexula pennata
- Deflexula sprucei
- Deflexula subsimplex
- Deflexula sulcispora
- Deflexula ulmi

== See also ==
- List of Agaricales genera
