= Apterostigma eowilsoni =

Apterostigma eowilsoni Temporal range: Lutetian

Scientific classification
- Domain: Eukaryota
- Kingdom: Animalia
- Phylum: Arthropoda
- Class: Insecta
- Order: Hymenoptera
- Family: Formicidae
- Subfamily: Myrmicinae
- Genus: Apterostigma
- Species: †A. eowilsoni

Binomial name
- †Apterostigma eowilsoni Schultz, 2007

Extinct species of ant

Apterostigma eowilsoni is an extinct species of ant in the subfamily Myrmicinae known from a single, possibly Miocene fossil found on Hispaniola. A. eowilsoni is one of only two species of the ant genus Apterostigma and one of five attini species to have been described from fossils found in Dominican amber.

== History and classification ==
Apterostigma eowilsoni is known from a solitary fossil insect, which is an inclusion in a transparent chunk of Dominican amber. The amber was produced by the extinct Hymenaea protera, which formerly grew on Hispaniola, across northern South America and up to southern Mexico. The specimens were collected from an undetermined amber mine in fossil bearing rocks of the Cordillera Septentrional mountains, northern Dominican Republic. The amber dates from at least the Burdigalian stage of the Miocene, based on studying the associated fossil foraminifera and may be as old as the Middle Eocene, based on the associated fossil coccoliths. This age range is due to the host rock being secondary deposits for the amber, and the Miocene age range is only the youngest; it might be.

The holotype amber specimen, number DR-16-292, is currently preserved in the amber collections of the US National Museum and is labeled as part of the Smithsonian Institution ant database as number 00443150. The fossil was first studied by entomologist Ted R. Schultz of the National Museum of Natural History, with his 2007 type description of the new species published in the journal Memoirs of the American Entomological Institute. The specific epithet eowilsoni is a patronym honoring Edward Osborne "E. O." Wilson for his long career and years of important myrmecological discovery.

Before the species' formal description in 2007, no Apterostigma species were known from the fossil record; however, three other Attini species were already known from Dominican Amber, Trachymyrmex primaevus, Cyphomyrmex maya, and Cyphomyrmex taino. Schultz's paper described a second Dominican amber Apterostigma species, A. electropilosum. This brings the total Attini fossil record to five species.

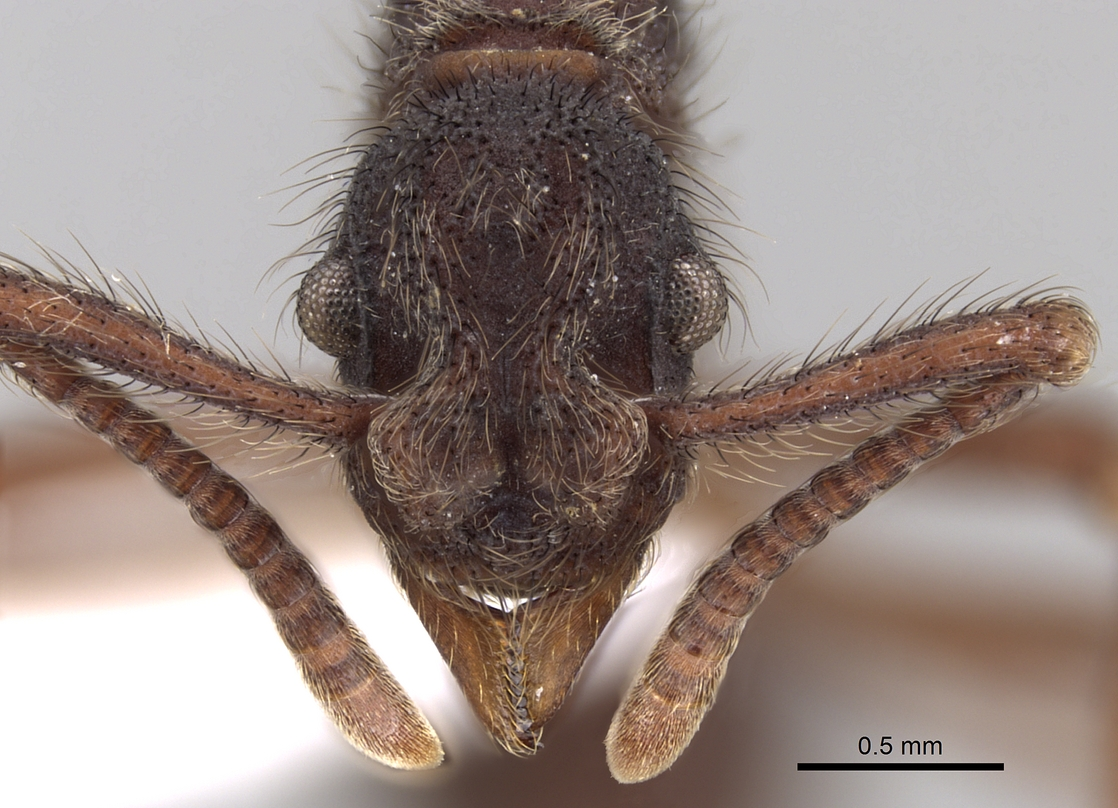
Apterostigma auriculatum worker showing eye placement

== Description ==
The Apterostigma eowilsoni specimen is well preserved with an estimated Weber's length of 1.44 millimetres (0.057 in) and a head length of 0.99 millimetres (0.039 in). The body has a fine covering of simple, upright setae which reach a total length of 0.15 millimetres (0.0059 in). The occiput, the rear area of the head capsule, is short, not forming a neck like that seen in A. electropilosum. The integument of the collar is rugose, with longitudinal stria. The antennae are composed of eleven segments, in which the tip segment is 2.25 times the length of the next segment. The eyes are rounded and bulbous in structure, with a circumference of twelve ommatidia. The bulbous eyes have a half hemisphere structure with ommatidia on the sides and front, while the rear sides are integument. The head capsule shows a smooth and shiny clypeus, a feature seen in the living pilosum group of Apterostigma species. However, the front edge of the clypeus is notably reduced, nearing the absent clypeus border that is a character of the "auriculatum" group. The clypeus structure is most similar to an undescribed pilosum group species collected in Costa Rica, while the eye structure is closest to a "auriculatum" group species A. pariense and A. reburrum. Given the ocular structure, A. eowilsoni is likely to have had excellent stereoscopic vision but poor side vision and been blind in the rear.
