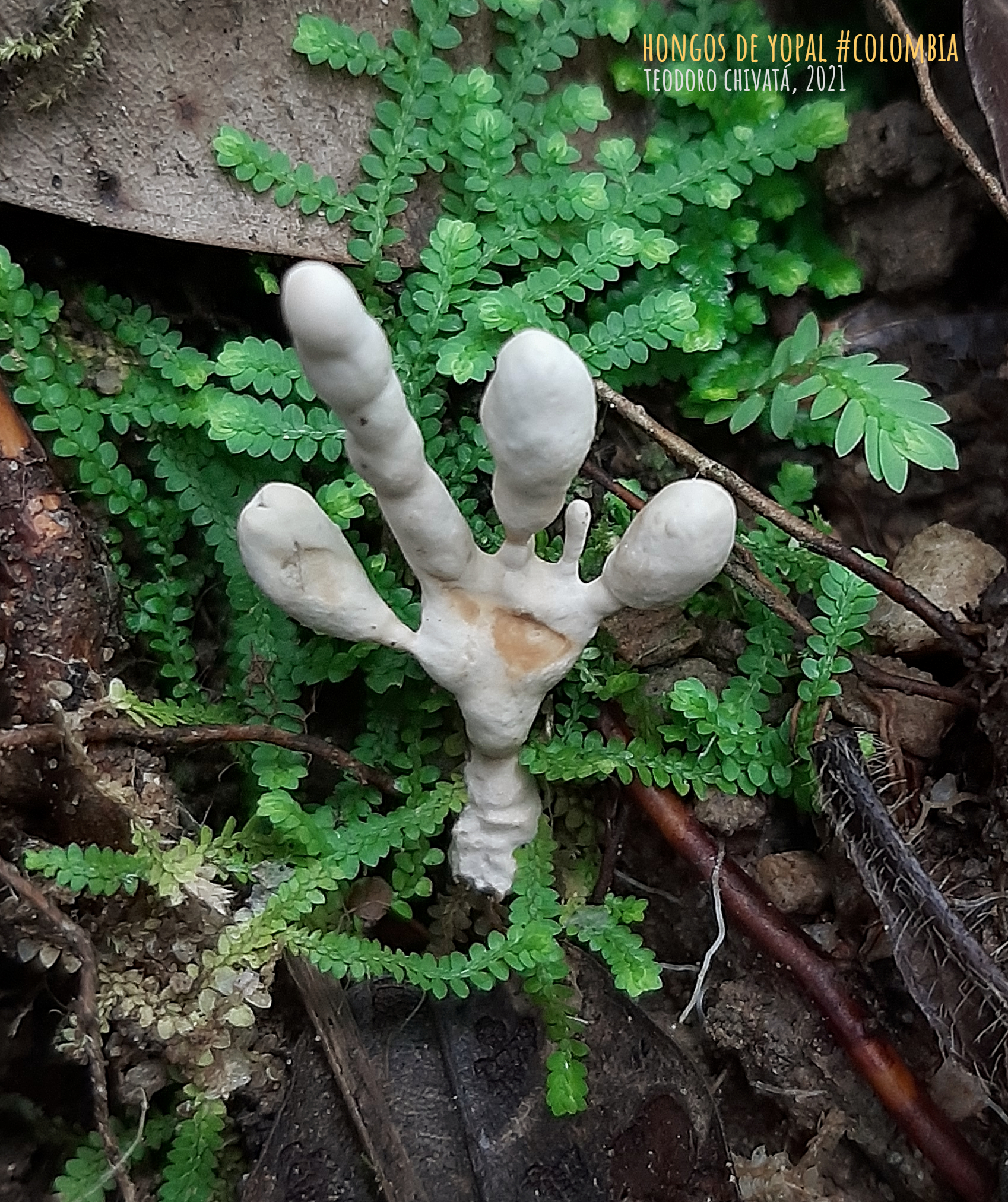
- Myrmecopterula moniliformis with infertile bead like fruiting bodies

Scientific classification
- Kingdom: Fungi
- Division: Basidiomycota
- Class: Agaricomycetes
- Order: Agaricales
- Family: Pterulaceae
- Genus: Myrmecopterula; Leal-Dutra, Dentinger & G.W. Griff. (2020)

Type species
- Myrmecopterula moniliformis (Henn.) Leal-Dutra, Dentinger & G.W. Griff. (2020)

= Myrmecopterula =

Genus of fungi

Myrmecopterula is a genus of fungi in the family Pterulaceae. Basidiocarps are clavarioid and are associated with ant domestication by members of the genus Apterostigma.

== Taxonomy ==
Myrmecopterula was created in 2020 when the Pterulaceae was reclassified based on phylogenetic analysis and split into Pterula, Myrmecopterula, Pterulicium. and Phaeopterula. Myrmecopterula is described as differing from Pterula in the presence of a cotton-like subiculum. In the context of mycology the subiculum is defined as a net, cottony or crust like growth of mycelium from which hyphae or fruiting bodies are produced.

The type species, M. moniliformis was originally classified as Lachnocladium moniliforme by the German mycologist Paul Christoph Hennings in 1904. It was classified as Thelephora clavarioides by the Portuguese mycologist Camille Torrend in 1914. It was reclassified as Pterula moniliformis by the English mycologist Edred John Henry Corner in 1952.

M. nudihortorum and M. velohortorum were originally classified as Pterula species by the American mycologist Bryn Tjader Mason Dentinger in 2014.

These species were ultimately all reclassified as Myrmecopterula by the mycologists Caio A. Leal-Dutra, Bryn Tjader Mason Dentinger and Gareth W. Griffith in 2020.

Prior to being formally classified, Myrmecopterula velohortorum was referred to as ant cultivar G2 in several studies. It was found in ant nests belonging to the Apterostigma dentigerum subclade and was cultivated in hanging 'veiled gardens' where the mycelium formed a thin envelope which surrounded the fungal garden. Gardens are hung under logs or inside cavities within them or rarely found in cavities in the ground. A single hole may exist in the veil serving as the entrance to the nest. It is hypothesized that M. velohortorum descended from M. nudihortorum with the two species then taking different evolutionary paths due to co-evolving with ants engaged in varying behaviors. Such as the weaving of mycelial threads to produce the veil which the ants are hypothesized to engage in.

Myrmecopterula nudihortorum was previously referred to as ant cultivar G4 and was found in ant nests belonging to the Apterostigma manni subclade. It is not cultivated in veiled hanging gardens and rather is cultivated in spongelike masses on the bottom of the garden cavity either under logs or in cavities excavated in the ground. The garden is not suspended by a woven veil. This nest building behaviour is more similar to that of lower attine ants which engage in cultivation of Lepiotaceous fungi belonging to the G3 group. Only one species of Apterostigma, Apterostigma auriculatum was documented as cultivating the G3 fungus.

== Description ==
As the 'myrme' prefix in the name Myrmecopterula would suggest, these species are associated with fungus farming ants found in the neotropics of South America. Myrmex means ants in Greek and Myrmecology is the study of ants.

The most common fungus known to be cultivated by leafcutter ants is Leucoagaricus gongylophorus (G1) with little documentation existing about other cultivated species. L. gongylophorus is cultivated by Atta and Acromyrmex ants, amongst others. Myrmecopterula fungi however are cultivated by Apterostigma ants. Unlike L. gongylophorus, which is no longer capable of spreading via spores, some Myrmecopterula species may produce sterile or fertile fruiting bodies and may therefore not be as entirely reliant upon the ants.

M. moniliformis produces two distinct forms of mushrooms. The first type resemble irregular strings of beads similar in appearance to some rhizomes produced by plants. These are sterile and lack an active hymenium to produce spores. The second type are fertile branching coral structures which may grow independently or attached to the sterile bead like structures. These coral like forms are more typical of mushrooms produced by other species in the Pterulaceae family. The presence of fertile mushrooms means that M. moniliformis is capable of reproducing and surviving without the ants.

M. nudihortorum and M. velohortorum have not been documented as producing fertile fruiting bodies. One explanation may be that mushroom production is actively suppressed by the ants as is seen in L. gongylophorus which only produces mushrooms when nests are abandoned however active suppression has not been documented in Myrmecopterula species. This may indicate that M. nudihortorum and M. velohortorum have been rendered incapable of producing fertile bodies as a result of prolonged domestication by ants.

One hypothesis for the presence of fertile fruiting bodies in M. moniliformis is that it may have descended from a lineage of ant-domesticated fungi which escaped from cultivation to become free-living fungi. It is still observed as growing on ant nests. The presence of the sterile mushrooms may be a genetic hangover from previous cultivation as this mutation is detrimental to non-domesticated fungi.

== Habitat and distribution ==
Myrmecopterula species are found in the neotropics of South America and are associated with ants of the Apterostigma genus. Species are usually found growing on top of living or dead ant nests or being cultivated by ants.

Some species of Myrmecopterula grow from soil whilst others appear to grow from wood however closer inspection reveals that rather than using the wood itself as a substrate they are instead found growing from loose debris within cavities in the wood. This substrate is sometimes similar in appearance to that of the fungal gardens of Apterostigma pilosum group ants, which have been documented cultivating Myrmecopterula species.

Apterostigma species have a distribution which covers South America with some species extending into Central America and Mexico this helps to understand the potential distribution of Myrmecopterula species. Due to some species of this genus being reliant upon ants and not producing mushrooms, observations are uncommon and would depend on observing the nests themselves. However as M. moniliformis produces both fertile and infertile mushrooms and can grow without the ants, observations of fruiting bodies can be made which place the distribution around Peru, Brazil, Colombia, Costa Rica and Bolivia. This may help inform the potential distribution of other Myrmecopterula species.

== Etymology ==
Myrmecopterula derives its name from the Greek Myrmex for ants and Pterula, the genus it formally belonged to.

== Species ==
At present three Myrmecopterula species have been named. These are also associated with cultivation by Apterostigma ants. Four other, unnamed and less well documented species are known.

- Myrmecopterula moniliformis
- Myrmecopterula nudihortorum
- Myrmecopterula velohortorum
