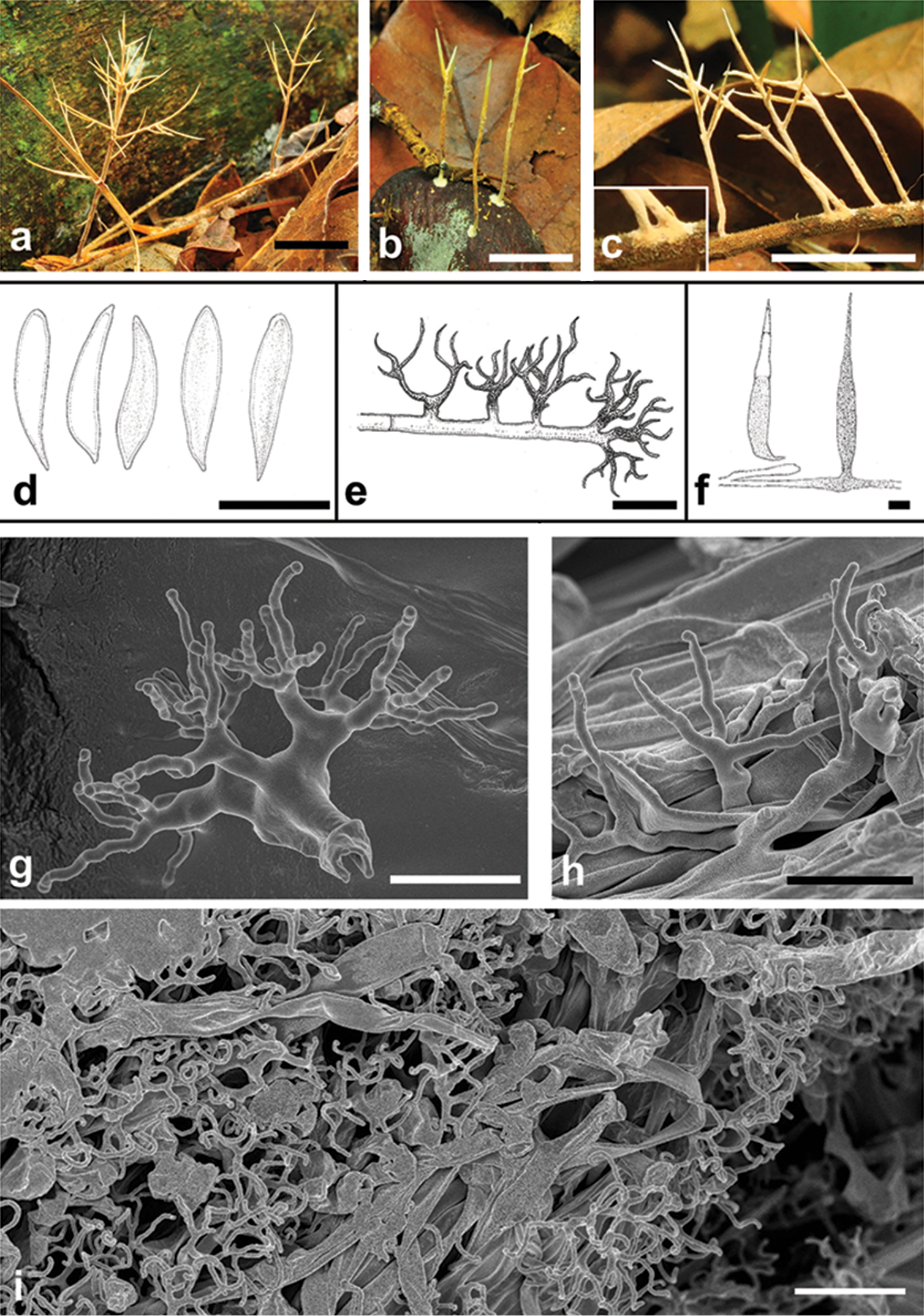
- Parapterulicium subarbusculum

Scientific classification
- Kingdom: Fungi
- Division: Basidiomycota
- Class: Agaricomycetes
- Order: Russulales
- Genus: Parapterulicium; Corner

Type species
- Parapterulicium subarbusculum Corner

Species
- P. simplex P. subarbusculum

= Parapterulicium =

Genus of fungi

Parapterulicium is a genus of fungi in the order Russulales. The genus contains two species found in Brazil and Argentina.

== Taxonomy ==
Parapterulicium octopodites was reclassified as Baltazaria octopodites in 2018.

== Species ==
- Parapterulicium simplex
- Parapterulicium subarbusculum
