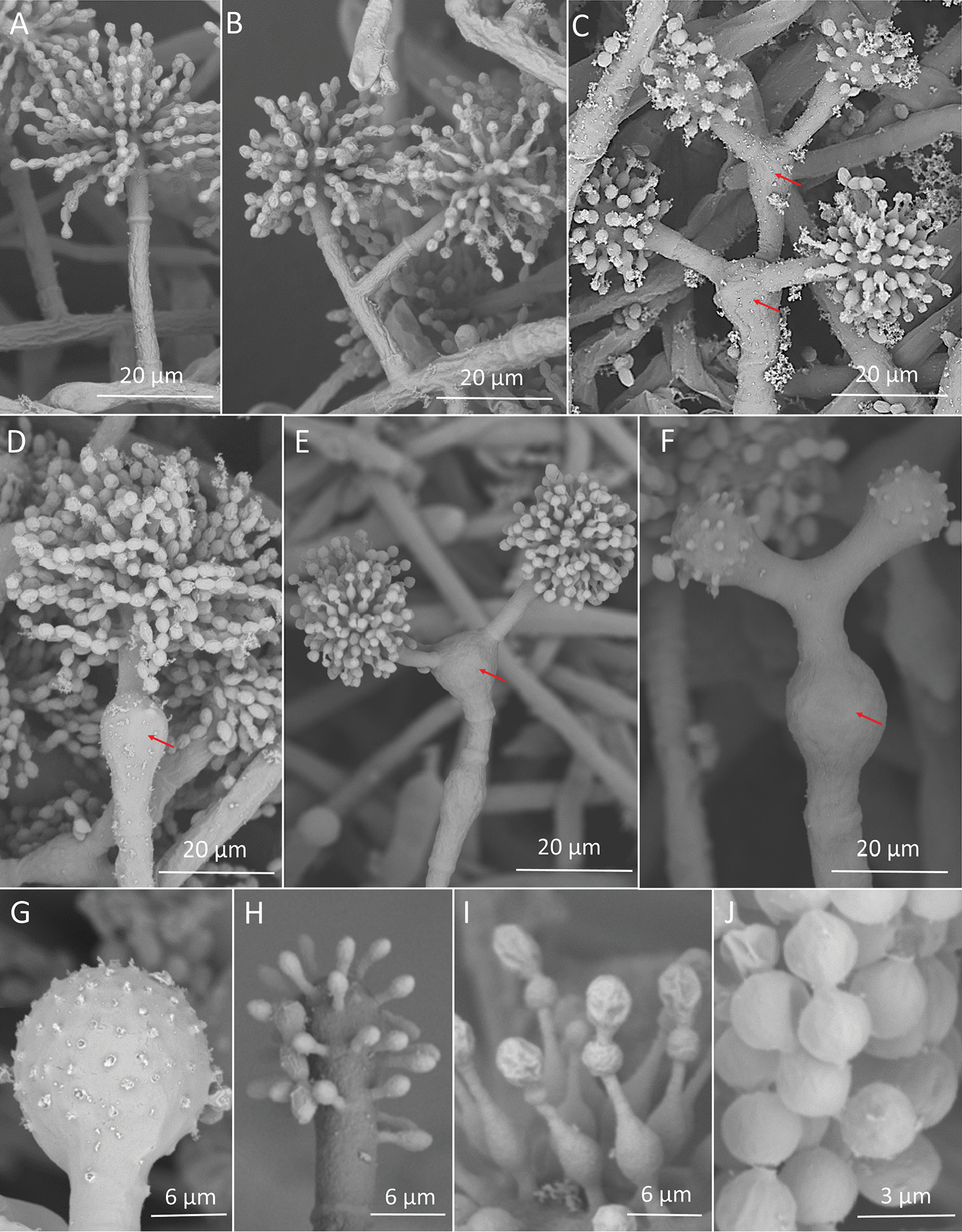
- Escovopsis multiformis SEM images A, B Conidiophores mono- and polycephalous without “swollen cells” C–F Conidiophores mono- and polycephalous with “swollen cells” (red arrows) G, H Vesicles I Phialides J Conidia

Scientific classification
- Kingdom: Fungi
- Division: Ascomycota
- Class: Sordariomycetes
- Order: Hypocreales
- Family: Hypocreaceae
- Genus: Escovopsis; J.J.Muchovej & Della Lucia (1990)

Type species
- Escovopsis weberi J.J.Muchovej & Della Lucia (1990)

Species
- E. aspergilloides E. clavata E. kreiselii E. lentecrescens E. microspora E. moelleri E. multiformis E. trichodermoides E. weberi

Synonyms
- Phialocladus Kreisel (1972)

= Escovopsis =

Genus of fungi

Escovopsis is a genus of seven formally acknowledged parasitic microfungus species that rely on other fungi to be their hosts. This genus formally circumscribed with a single identified species in 1990; in 2013 three other species were added.

In an early 2015 published study, scientists collected five species of Escovopsis from both genera of fungus-growing ants, Atta and Acromyrmex, four of which came from ant colonies in Brazil and the fifth of which came from Trinidad. These Escovopsis species included E. moelleri, E. microspora, E. weberi, E. lentecrescens, and E. aspergilloides. The research revealed another Escovopsis species (E. trichodermoides) isolated and derived from the lower attine ant, Mycocepurus goeldii. It was determined to be a species independent of the other five species because of its complex branch system and varying conidiophores, which lack typical swelling.

A separate study published in January 2015 also looked at the lower attine ant, Mycetophylax morschi, in Brazil and found four strains for the Escovopsis. The scientists that conducted this research also noticed distinguishable features of the Escovopsis such as the type and physicality of the conidiophores and conidiogenous cells and the DNA sequences. They named the species Escovopsis kreiselii.

== Parasitism ==
This genus describes a parasitic fungus capable of horizontally transmitting between colonies, which can affect any of the 47 species of ants commonly known as the leafcutter ants, which are widespread in parts of the Americas. The fungus transmits itself between colonies by utilizing infected external material. Only two species of the pathogenic Escovopsis have been formally made known, although the other rising species and Escovopsis in general is known to act destructively toward the symbiotic relationship between the ant colonies and their fungus gardens. It was only established as a symbiont of this ant-fungus mutualism proceeding studies that consistently isolated the fungus. However, the leafcutter ants have a defense mechanism against the parasitic fungus, an antifungal actinobacteria from the genus Pseudonocardia.

A study conducted at the University of Costa Rica, San Pedro de Montes de Oca produced results that indicated how strains of Escovopsis in Costa Rica are "better suited" to invade and induce their parasitic effects on the ant colonies (specifically from the Attini tribe and genera Atta and Acromyrmex) than selectively bred fungus. This was concluded from the fact that the Escovopsis strains created several clusters or clades, some more virulent than others, while the fungal cultivar only created a single cluster or clade. This means that the ants in the colonies would be able to reduce, eliminate, and defend against the fungal cultivar much easier and quicker than it would be able to for Escovopsis strains. According to the scientists that undertook the study, the coevolved Escovopsis can be used as a biocontrol agent for the population of these leafcutter ants, which are considered agricultural pests in these areas.

Leafcutter ants communicate through exchanges of chemicals and secrete chemicals made from actinomycete bacteria in order to protect their colonies. The Atta colonies have a hierarchal system of workers and use chemical secretions through metapleural glands, which are capable of producing much phenylacetic acid, an antimicrobial agent. A study demonstrated how the smallest worker ants were able to lower growth rates of Escovopsis spores that were placed into the ants’ fungus garden with this phenylacetic acid. Bioassays showed that Escovopsis from leafcutter ants is not as affected by the acid than that from more basic fungus-growing ants, meaning that there is a need to control the growth of the parasitic Escovopsis fungus because of its virulence as a potential pathogen.
