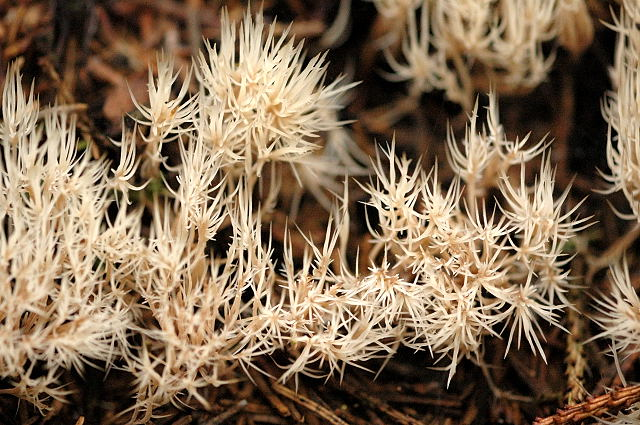
- Pterula subulata

Scientific classification
- Kingdom: Fungi
- Division: Basidiomycota
- Class: Agaricomycetes
- Order: Agaricales
- Family: Pterulaceae
- Genus: Pterula; Fr. (1825)

Type species
- Pterula plumosa (Schwein.) Fr.

= Pterula =

Genus of fungi

Pterula is a genus of fungi in the Pterulaceae family. The genus has a widespread distribution, especially in tropical regions, and contains about 50 species. One such species, Pterula sp. 82168, has yielded potential antifungal antibiotic properties.

== Taxonomy ==
A major reclassification of the Pterulaceae family occurred in occurred in 2020 and Pterula was reclassified based on phylogenetic analysis and split into Pterula, Myrmecopterula, Pterulicium and Phaeopterula genera by the mycologists Caio A. Leal-Dutra, Bryn Tjader Mason Dentinger and Gareth W. Griffith.

== Species ==
As of July 2022, Species Fungorum accepted 67 species of Pterula.

1. Pterula abietis
2. Pterula aciculiformis
3. Pterula actinaeformis
4. Pterula adustipes
5. Pterula arborea
6. Pterula bresadolana
7. Pterula brunneola
8. Pterula capillaris
9. Pterula carpophila
10. Pterula commersonii
11. Pterula complanata
12. Pterula crispa
13. Pterula culmicola
14. Pterula decaryi
15. Pterula decumbens
16. Pterula dilatata
17. Pterula divaricata
18. Pterula exserta
19. Pterula falcatula
20. Pterula fastigiata
21. Pterula filaris
22. Pterula fructicola
23. Pterula frutica
24. Pterula fulvescens
25. Pterula fusispora
26. Pterula grandis
27. Pterula himalayensis
28. Pterula hirsuta
29. Pterula hyphoides
30. Pterula importata
31. Pterula incisa
32. Pterula indica
33. Pterula janseniana
34. Pterula juruensis
35. Pterula landolphiae
36. Pterula lecomtei
37. Pterula loretensis
38. Pterula mannii
39. Pterula millei
40. Pterula multifida
41. Pterula parvispora
42. Pterula penicellata
43. Pterula penniseti
44. Pterula plumosa
45. Pterula plumosoides
46. Pterula pteridicola
47. Pterula pterulicioides
48. Pterula pungensis
49. Pterula pusilla
50. Pterula ramosa
51. Pterula robusta
52. Pterula setacea
53. Pterula setosa
54. Pterula simplex
55. Pterula squarrosa
56. Pterula subplumosa
57. Pterula subulata
58. Pterula subuliformis
59. Pterula taxa
60. Pterula thindii
61. Pterula timorensis
62. Pterula togoensis
63. Pterula uleana
64. Pterula vanderystii
65. Pterula verticillata
66. Pterula vinacea
67. Pterula winkleriana
