= Mycocepurus castrator =

Scientific classification
- Domain: Eukaryota
- Kingdom: Animalia
- Phylum: Arthropoda
- Class: Insecta
- Order: Hymenoptera
- Family: Formicidae
- Subfamily: Myrmicinae
- Tribe: Attini
- Genus: Mycocepurus
- Species: M. castrator

Binomial name
- Mycocepurus castrator Rabeling & Bacci, 2010

Species of ant

Mycocepurus castrator is a species of parasitic ant, in the genus Mycocepurus, native to Brazil. Described in 2010, the species is a workerless and obligate parasite of the related ant Mycocepurus goeldii. It is known only from Rio Claro, Brazil, and has only been found in nests of M. goeldii.

M. castrator and its host are closely related and diverged recently, around 37,000 years ago. They evolved in the same geographic region, making the parasite–host pair an example of sympatric speciation. The species is the first inquiline known among the lower attines.

== Etymology ==
Because M. goeldii nests that host M. castrator appear to only produce sterile workers, the species has been named "castrator" in reference to that.

== Description ==
M. castrator is a relatively minuscule species, with the average wing length being about 1.07–1.23 millimeters. The head is rectangular in shape, measuring about 0.6 millimeters across the face. The antennae consist of 11 segments. The species has stout, sharp, propodeal spines. The body, which ranges between light and dark reddish-brown, is thinly covered in setae. The body surface is shiny and patterned with tiny hexagonal structures.

Unlike most species of Mycocepurus, males and females are physically similar. Distinguishing characteristics include the mandibles; the mandible terminates in a tooth in females, but does not do so in males. The first gastric tergite is only slightly concave in males, but markedly so in females. Finally, males' wings are medium to dark brown.

The species is not believed to have a worker caste.

== Habitat and distribution ==
M. castrator has only been observed in nests on the grounds of the São Paulo State University in Rio Claro, São Paulo, Brazil. It has only been found in nests of M. goeldii, which is a widely distributed species, known from Brazil to northern Argentina. Like many other inquilines, M. castrator has small and isolated populations.

== Natural history ==
Described in 2010, M. castrator is a social obligate parasite and the first inquiline known among the lower attines. The sex ratio for the species is skewed strongly toward females, with a ratio of about 11 to 1. The species is host-tolerant, with dealate queens of the species being found in the same nest chambers as queens of M. goeldii. However, it also inhibits its host's reproduction, preventing the production of fertile offspring.

== Behavior ==
=== Interaction with host species ===
M. goeldii workers will feed M. castrator queens in a process called trophallaxis. The two species will also engage in grooming each other, with dealate M. castrator queens frequently climbing on top of M. goeldii workers and queens.

Host workers have also been observed to attack and kill parasite queens.

== Reproduction ==
M. castrator is polygynous (nests consisting of multiple queens). The species mates inside the nest, as opposed to engaging in a nuptial flight like most ants. During mating, males and females copulate seemingly at random, with copulation lasting 18 to 27 seconds on average. Female alates begin to lose their wings three hours after mating, after which they congregate and engage in social grooming. Males begin to die twelve hours after mating.

== Relationship to Mycocepurus goeldii ==
M. castrator is directly descended from M. goeldii, its host. Such relationships are not uncommon among social parasites, as recognized by Emery's rule. Less common are cases like M. castrator's, where two species diverge without the benefit of geographic isolation, known as sympatric speciation. Rabeling et al. (2014) analyzed divergence of mitochondrial versus nuclear DNA, finding that the nuclear alleles bore more similarities than the mitochondrial alleles. This led them to rule out the possibility of recent interbreeding, and conclude that sympatric speciation had occurred. The two species are believed to have diverged around 37,000 years ago, during the late Pleistocene.
