= Gongylidia =

Swellings of fungus cultivated by fungus-growing ants

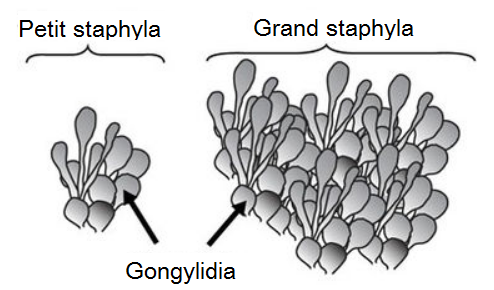
French depiction of gongylidia and staphylae in different sizes

Gongylidia (singular gongylidium) are hyphal swellings of fungus cultivated by higher-attine genera of fungus-growing ants. This fungus no longer exists naturally outside the ant colonies.

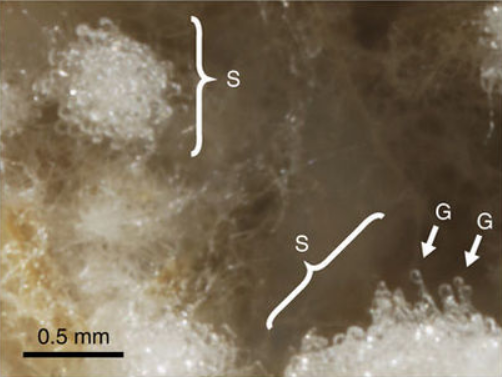
Photograph of gongylidia (G) and staphylae (S) in a fungal garden taken care of by Acromyrmex echinatior

Developing larvae feed on the gongylidia and distributed throughout the colony to feed workers, soldiers, and the queen. They are ellipsoid, about 30–50 micrometres in diameter, rich in lipids and carbohydrates derived from the leaves, and are produced in clusters (called staphylae).

== See also ==
- Pearl body
- Leucoagaricus gongylophorus
