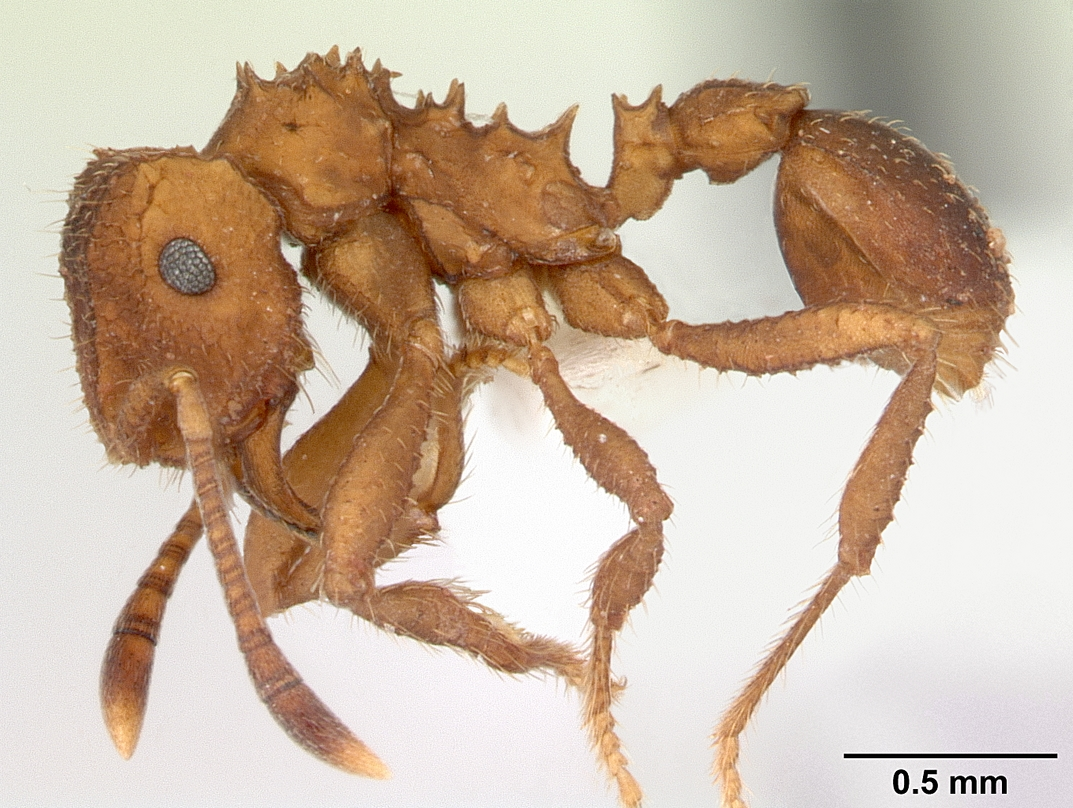
- M. goeldii worker

Scientific classification
- Domain: Eukaryota
- Kingdom: Animalia
- Phylum: Arthropoda
- Class: Insecta
- Order: Hymenoptera
- Family: Formicidae
- Subfamily: Myrmicinae
- Genus: Mycocepurus
- Species: M. goeldii

Binomial name
- Mycocepurus goeldii (Forel, 1893)

= Mycocepurus goeldii =

Species of ant

Mycocepurus goeldii is a species of ant in the genus Mycocepurus.

The species is parasitised by a closely related species, Mycocepurus castrator. The two diverged recently, around 37,000 years ago, and evolved in the same geographic region, making the parasite–host pair an example of sympatric speciation.

M. castrator is directly descended from M. goeldii, its host. Such relationships are not uncommon among social parasites, as recognized by Emery's rule. Less common are cases like M. castrator's, where two species diverge without the benefit of geographic isolation, known as sympatric speciation. Rabeling et al. (2014) analyzed divergence of mitochondrial versus nuclear DNA, finding that the nuclear alleles bore more similarities than the mitochondrial alleles. This led them to rule out the possibility of recent interbreeding, and conclude that sympatric speciation had occurred. The two species are believed to have diverged around 37,000 years ago, during the late Pleistocene.

In 2023 a study on fungus cultivated by lower attine ants described the fungal species cultivated by Mycocepurus goeldii as Leucocoprinus attinorum.
