= Phaeopterula =

Scientific classification
- Kingdom: Fungi
- Division: Basidiomycota
- Class: Agaricomycetes
- Order: Agaricales
- Family: Pterulaceae
- Genus: Phaeopterula; Henn. (1905)

Type species
- Phaeopterula hirsuta (Henn.) Sacc. & D. Sacc.

Genus of fungi

Phaeopterula is a genus of fungi in the family Pterulaceae. Basidiocarps are clavarioid and resemble species of Pterula.

== Taxonomy ==
This genus was originally described by the German mycologist Paul Christoph Hennings in 1905 but most subsequent mycologists considered it a synonym of Pterula. The genus was resurrected in 2020 when a major reclassification of the Pterulaceae based on phylogenetic analysis split the family into four genera: Pterula, Myrmecopterula, Pterulicium, and Phaeopterula. Three former Pterula species were added to Phaeopterula.

== Species ==
As of October 2022, Species Fungorum accepted five species of Phaeopterula.

- Phaeopterula anomala
- Phaeopterula hirsuta
- Phaeopterula juruensis
- Phaeopterula stipata
- Phaeopterula taxiformis
