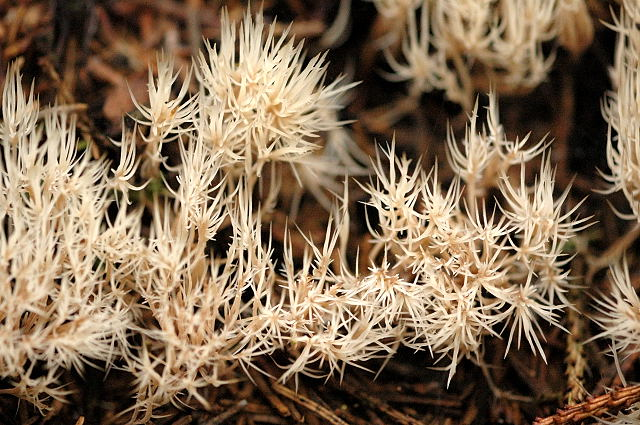
- Pterula subulata

Scientific classification
- Kingdom: Fungi
- Division: Basidiomycota
- Class: Agaricomycetes
- Order: Agaricales
- Family: Pterulaceae; Corner (1970)

Type genus
- Pterula Fr. (1825)

Genera
- Allantula; Coronicium; Merulicium; Myrmecopterula; Phaeopterula; Pterula; Pterulicium

= Pterulaceae =

Family of fungi

The Pterulaceae are a family of fungi in the order Agaricales. According to a 2008 estimate, the family contained 99 species previously distributed among 12 genera. More recent data from molecular phylogenetic reconstruction showed that members of the genus Parapterulicium are unrelated to Pterulaceae and also polyphyletic. A new genus Baltazaria was created and both genera were moved to Russulales, to families Lachnocladiaceae and Peniophoraceae respectively.

A major reappraisal of Pterulaceae was recently published by Leal-Dutra et al., creating the new genus Myrmecopterula, to encompass those species cultivated by Apterostigma ants in the neotropics, and resurrecting the genus Phaeopterula to accommodate species with darker basidiomes. The genus Deflexula was merged into Pterulicium. Additionally, the genera Aphanobasidium, Radulomyces and Radulotubus were removed to a new family, Radulomycetaceae.

== See also ==
- List of Agaricales families
