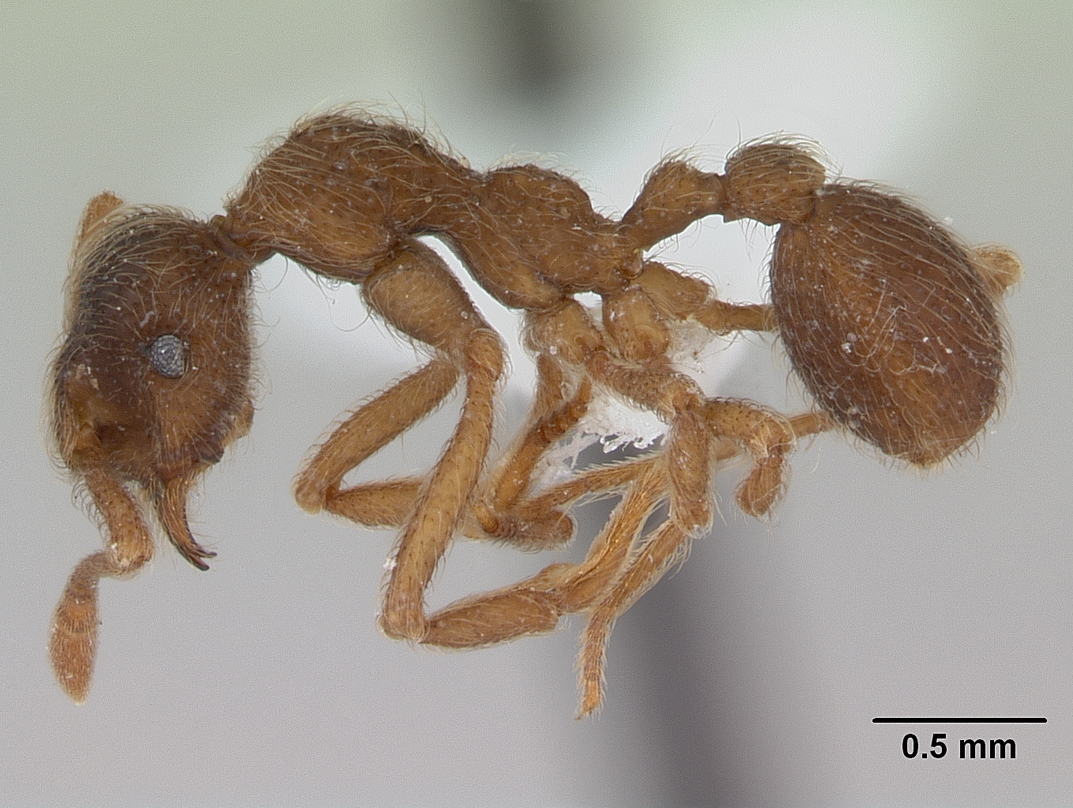
- Apterostigma pilosum worker

Scientific classification
- Kingdom: Animalia
- Phylum: Arthropoda
- Class: Insecta
- Order: Hymenoptera
- Family: Formicidae
- Subfamily: Myrmicinae
- Tribe: Attini
- Genus: Apterostigma; Mayr, 1865

Type species
- Apterostigma pilosum Mayr, 1865

Diversity
- 46 species

= Apterostigma =

Apterostigma Temporal range: Burdigalian - Present

Genus of ants

Apterostigma is a genus of New World ants of the subfamily Myrmicinae. Two species have been described from fossils preserved in Dominican amber, while the others are extant. They are fungus-growing ants, though, unlike the majority of other species in Attini who grow Lepiotaceae, some species have begun cultivating Tricholomataceae.

== History ==
The genus Apterostigma was described by Gustav Mayr (1865), from winged male and female specimens collected in southern Brazil. It is a New World ant belonging to the Attina Subtribe (fungivorous ants), since they maintain the ant-fungus mutualism, where various species belonging to this subfamily use fungi from the Lepiotaceae family. The fungus decomposes the litter (vegetable material collected by the ants, used as a substrate), however, this is not the case of the genus Apterostigma, since it has been found that it cultivates a pterulaceous fungus of the Tricholomataceae family, which is given as a substrate. woody matter and insect excretions, along with some bits of leaf litter.

== Diagnosis ==
=== Worker ===
Head elongated, without isolated spines or denticles; Ventrally the eye is bordered by a convexity, the vertex extending into a sheet that delimits the occipital zone and forms a neck of variable length and width. the pronotum presents an anterior transverse edge, the cervical edge; the mesonotum presents a pair of thick longitudinal and parallel ridges of variable development and elevation; occasionally the propodeum presents a pair of isolated spines or denticles, although in some species the mesonotal ridges may form anterior triangular lobes. Both the petiole and the post-petiole lack denticles or dorsal tubercles. the first tergus of the gaster presents on each side a longitudinal edge of variable development; the gaster generally presents a finely granulated cuticle, sometimes rough; with roughness or small piliferous papillae; never with prominent denticles or tubercles. Body hairs consisting of flexible hairs, apically pointed, always arching or basally curved, occasionally silky, sometimes wiry; never straight, spatuliform, or squamiform.

== Description ==
Head long; generally devoid of spines or denticles, except for some species with two low tubercles on the forehead and between the eyes. With the head in frontal view, the posteromedian profile generally presents a low emargination or at least a flat area; the posterolateral profile may be evenly convex or have a semi-hexagonal posterior profile to the eyes; a straight and vertical section posterior to each eye separated by a rounded angle from another straight and inclined section, which in turn is separated by a rounded angle, or sometimes a ridge, from the posteromedian emargination.

Frontal lobes in frontal view totally cover the condyle and antennal fossa, may have a rounded lateral profile or be divided by sharp angles or curves into subquadrate or triangular shapes. The lobes are separated by a narrow longitudinal groove or depression, the interlobular depression. Posteriorly, the lateral profiles of the lobes converge and join the frontal ridges, which diverge posteriorly and laterally border the dorsomedian depression, a slightly concavity.

Depth. Just between the base of the frontal ridges there is usually a thin, short longitudinal ridge, the interlobular ridge. The frontal ridges are of variable development and length, generally not extending posteriorly beyond an ocular diameter at the same level as the posterior ocular edge. A fine transverse ridge may be present between the supra-ocular ridge and the frontal ridge, and there is usually a convexity or conical ridge where they intersect. Occasionally there are two short longitudinal ridges between the posterior edge of the dorsomedian depression and the apex.

Clipeo with its front profile mainly convex, but also transverse or concave; a narrow anterior stripe of shiny cuticle with fine transverse striations is often present; anteromedian seta absent. The clipeo rises posteromedially to form a convexity bordered posteriorly by the frontal lobes; occasionally the frontoclypeal suture is evident. Compound eyes always present, in lateral view reniform or ellipsoidal, occasionally nearly circular. Eyes bordered dorsally by a shallow groove, the edge opposite the eye often forming part of a short longitudinal ridge, or supra-ocular ridge. Ventrally the eye is bordered by a convexity, sometimes higher than the eye itself, the subocular prominence. Antennae 11 segments; the scape reaches or exceeds the posterior border of the apex.

== Distribution ==
The distribution of this genus, like the other Attinos, occurs in Central and South America, estimated to be from southern Mexico (approx. Veracruz) to northern Argentina (including certain parts of Buenos Aires).

As we already mentioned, these are only from America, so they correspond to the Neotropical region, to be more specific they can be found in the Mexican, Brazilian subregion, and in a few parts of the Andean, as well as in the Patagonian.

The presence of this genus in the Patagonian region was unknown, but new records in the province of Córdoba prove the presence of this genus in all subregions of Argentina.

== Species ==
- Apterostigma acre Lattke, 1997
- Apterostigma ancilonodum Lattke, 1997
- Apterostigma andense Lattke, 1997
- Apterostigma angustum Lattke, 1997
- Apterostigma auriculatum Wheeler, 1925
- Apterostigma avium Lattke, 1997
- Apterostigma bolivianum Weber, 1938
- Apterostigma bruchi Santschi, 1919
- Apterostigma callipygium Lattke, 1997
- Apterostigma calverti Wheeler, 1911
- Apterostigma carinatum Lattke, 1997
- Apterostigma chocoense Lattke, 1997
- Apterostigma collare Emery, 1896
- Apterostigma convexum Lattke, 1997
- Apterostigma dentigerum Wheeler, 1925
- Apterostigma depressum Lattke, 1997
- Apterostigma dorotheae Weber, 1937
- †Apterostigma electropilosum Schultz, 2007
- †Apterostigma eowilsoni Schultz, 2007
- Apterostigma epinotale Weber, 1937
- Apterostigma goniodes Lattke, 1997
- Apterostigma ierense Weber, 1937
- Apterostigma jubatum Wheeler, 1925
- Apterostigma madidiense Weber, 1938
- Apterostigma manni Weber, 1938
- Apterostigma mayri Forel, 1893
- Apterostigma megacephala Lattke, 1999
- Apterostigma mexicanum Lattke, 1997
- Apterostigma moelleri Forel, 1892
- Apterostigma pariense Lattke, 1997
- Apterostigma peruvianum Wheeler, 1925
- Apterostigma pilosum Mayr, 1865
- Apterostigma reburrum Lattke, 1997
- Apterostigma robustum Emery, 1896
- Apterostigma scutellare Forel, 1885
- Apterostigma serratum Lattke, 1997
- Apterostigma spiculum Lattke, 1997
- Apterostigma steigeri Santschi, 1911
- Apterostigma tachirense Lattke, 1997
- Apterostigma tholiforme Lattke, 1997
- Apterostigma tramitis Weber, 1940
- Apterostigma trapeziforme Lattke, 1997
- Apterostigma tropicoxa Lattke, 1997
- Apterostigma turgidum Lattke, 1997
- Apterostigma urichii Forel, 1893
- Apterostigma wasmannii Forel, 1892

== Habits ==
Some species build their nests on the abaxial face of the leaf, or between the leaves (tree layer), others prefer to nest in wood, which may or may not be in a state of decomposition or simply nest on the ground.

They form small colonies which not usually exceed 100 individuals.

Their nests are veiled (covered by a veil), frequently in their natural state they can be seen in a disordered way, it is thought that this can happen because these types of nests are very fragile, and with little alteration accidentally makes these break, or with a pull to a root to spoil it, within each species the shape of the nests are varied, although these are not a good character for their identification.

It has been verified that during periods of drought a large proportion of Apterostigma (pilosum) nests grow the veil so that it closes, it is believed that this may occur because in dry/very hot seasons there is a greater need for the veil as a protector, in certain cases colonies were observed migrating to slightly more humid areas (in case they were too exposed), and in humid seasons, incomplete veils can be seen mostly.
