= Bryn Dentinger =

American biologist & mycologist

- Born: Duluth, Minnesota, U.S.
- Other name: Bryn Tjader Mason Dentinger
- Education: Macalester College; University of Minnesota
- Occupation: Mycologist
- Employer(s): University of Utah; Natural History Museum of Utah
- Website: dentingerlab.org

Bryn Dentinger is an American biologist and mycologist. He is an associate professor of biology at the University of Utah and is the curator of mycology for the Natural History Museum of Utah (NHMU).

Dentinger and colleages are known for having published the largest study to date in 2024 of the evolution of Psilocybe mushrooms, the major genus of psilocybin-containing mushrooms.

Dentinger is said to be one of the world's leading experts on bolete mushrooms. His doctoral student Colin Domnauer is studying the hallucinogenic bolete mushroom Lanmaoa asiatica, and Dentinger's lab is attempting to isolate the hallucinogenic constituents of this enigmatic organism.

== See also ==
- List of mycologists
