= Trevelyan =

Trevelyan, or its variant Trevillian, is a Welsh and Cornish name derived from a place-name which originally meant "farmstead 'trev' or Tref (town in Welsh) of Elyan".

== People with the surname ==
- Alf Trevillian (1877–1954), Australian Rules footballer for St. Kilda FC
- Anne-Marie Trevelyan (born 1969), British Conservative Party politician, Member of Parliament (MP) for Berwick upon Tweed
- Sir Charles Trevelyan, 1st Baronet, 2nd creation (1807–1886), British civil servant
- Sir Charles Trevelyan, 3rd Baronet, 2nd creation (1870–1958), British Member of Parliament
- Francis Trevelyan Buckland (1826–1880), English surgeon, zoologist, popular author and natural historian
- George Macaulay Trevelyan (1876–1962), British historian and university administrator
- Sir George Trevelyan, 3rd Baronet, 1st creation (1707–1768)
- Sir George Trevelyan, 2nd Baronet, 2nd creation (1838–1928), British statesman and historian, as George Otto Trevelyan
- Sir George Trevelyan, 4th Baronet, 2nd creation (1906–1996), British new age spiritualist
- Humphrey Trevelyan, Baron Trevelyan (1905–1985), British diplomat and author
- John Trevelyan (disambiguation), several people
- Julian Trevelyan (1910–1988), English artist and poet
- Julian Trevelyan (pianist) (born 1998), British concert pianist
- Laura Trevelyan (born 1968), BBC journalist
- Mary Caroline Moorman (1905–1994) née Trevelyan, English historian
- Maverick Trevillian (born 2011), better known as the 6-7 kid
- R. C. Trevelyan (1872–1951), English poet and translator
- Raleigh Trevelyan (1923–2014), British author, editor and publisher
- Robert Trevelyan (cricketer) (born 1970), English first-class cricketer
- Sir Walter Calverley Trevelyan, 6th Baronet, 1st creation (1797–1879)
- Walter Trevelyan (1821–1894), English first-class cricketer and barrister

=== Characters ===
- Alec Trevelyan, a character in the James Bond movie GoldenEye
- Dr. Francis Trevelyan, a character in The Spy with a Cold Nose
- Dr. Trevelyan, a character in "The Adventure of the Resident Patient" by Arthur Conan Doyle
- Captain Trevelyan, a character in The Sittaford Mystery by Agatha Christie
- Louis Trevelyan, a character in He Knew He Was Right by Anthony Trollope
- Christian Trevelyan Grey, a character in Fifty Shades of Grey by EL James
- Kurt Trevelyan, a character in Halo: Ghosts of Onyx by Eric Nylund
- Trevelyan, a character who escaped the inundation of the sea when Lyonesse was engulfed
- Inquisitor Trevelyan, a potential player character in Dragon Age: Inquisition
- Colley Trevelyan, a character in "Sparrows in the Scullery" by Barbara Brooks Wallace
- Armand Trevelyan, a character in Isaac Asimov's novella "Profession"
- Maxim Trevelyan, character in The Mister by E. L. James

== People with the forename ==
- Trevelyan Richards, coxswain of the RNLI lifeboat during the Penlee lifeboat disaster

== Other uses ==
- Trevelyan baronets
- Trevelyan College, Durham, England
- Trevelyan, an 1833 novel by Caroline Lucy Scott
- Trevelyan's char (Salvelinus colii), a cold-water fish

== See also ==
- Louise Trevillyan
- Trevelin
