= John Trevelyan =

John Trevelyan may refer to:

- Sir John Trevelyan, 2nd Baronet (1670–1755), British MP
- Sir John Trevelyan, 4th Baronet (1735–1828), British MP
- John Trevelyan (censor) (1903–1986), Secretary of the Board of the British Board of Film Censors
- John Trevelyan (chess player) (born 1948), Welsh chess player

== See also ==
- Trevelyan (disambiguation)
- The Trevelyan baronets of Nettlecombe
