= Mary Trevelyan =

British activist

Mary Trevelyan CBE (22 January 1897 – 10 January 1983) was a British activist who was warden of the Student Movement House then founder and governor of International Students House, London, and founder of the Goats Club for foreign students. Trevelyan worked to solve the problems of overseas students in London, to help them establish the best possible memory of Britain and the British people, and to promote international friendship amongst these students which could be continued even after they left Britain. Trevelyan was appointed as both an OBE and later promoted to CBE.

== Early life and career ==
Mary Trevelyan was born on 22 January 1897, the eldest of four daughters and two sons born to the Reverend George Philip Trevelyan (1858–1937)- a descendant of Sir John Trevelyan, 4th Baronet, of an ancient Cornish family- and Monica Evelyn Juliet, daughter of Rev. Sidney Phillips, of Worcester. Her brothers were the film censor John Trevelyan and the colonial administrator and writer Humphrey Trevelyan, Baron Trevelyan. She was educated at Grovely College Boscombe and the Royal College of Music, London. She was founder and Governor of the International Students' House, London, Warden Student Movement House, first Advisor to Overseas Students London U 1949–65 in 1932. In the New Year Honours 1956 Trevelyan was appointed an Officer of The Most Excellent Order of the British Empire and on 31 May 1968 was promoted to Commander of The Most Excellent Order of the British Empire. Trevelyan was appointed organist and choir trainer at St Barnabas, Oxford. She later joined the music staff at Radley and Marlborough Colleges.

== Student Movement House (SMH) ==
After a private tour of India and Ceylon, Trevelyan returned to Britain in 1932 and began searching for work. She had intended to return to a musical profession but began to wonder if she could help groups of Indian students she noticed on the streets 'looking lost in the wintry rain'. From 1932 to 1946, Mary Trevelyan was the warden of Student Movement House, first on Russell Square then nearby at Gower Street,. In 1936 and 1937 she travelled extensively to investigate the problems encountered by students from Far Eastern countries returning home from Europe and America. She also visited the International Houses of the USA. The journey convinced her of the need for a similar organisation in London as the overseas student population continued to grow. By the beginning of 1942, membership of SMH had increased to a total of 1,183 and by 1944 to 1,200 from 54 countries.

In 1944, after nearly 12 years as Warden of the House, Mary felt the need for a break and resigned from her position. Mary went on to work with the YMCA in France and in 1945 she spent her time organising a reception centre for returning prisoners of war, outside Brussels. From 1946 to 1948 she accepted an invitation to become Head of the Field survey bureau in the UNESCO Department of Reconstruction in Paris. She spent part of this time visiting and making surveys on priority needs in education after the war in Burma, Malaya, Singapore, Hong Kong, North Borneo and the Philippines.

From 1938 to 1957 she was friend and companion of T. S. Eliot. Trevelyan wanted to marry him, and left a detailed memoir.

== Goats Club ==
On her return to London in 1948, Mary Trevelyan was invited by the then Principal of the University of London to become the first adviser to Overseas Students at the University of London, a post she held until 1965. During this period she played a major part in the founding of the London Conference on Overseas Students. She also founded the Goats Club in 1956 as a weekly, inter-collegiate, international gathering of students. The Duke of Grafton, Hugh FitzRoy later became the president of the club.

== International Students House, London ==
By 1956 there were over 36,000 overseas students in London alone and Trevelyan saw an urgent need for an International House. By 1962 Trevelyan and a group of supporters formed a charitable trust and began building International Students House in Park Crescent. The Queen Mother, who had maintained a strong interest in Trevelyan's work, promised to consider patronizing an established Trust and to support the project. In May 1962 International Students Trust was incorporated as a non-profit limited liability company without share capital and was registered with the Charity Commissioners. Trevelyan oversaw the opening of 'the House' in May 1965 and was its first director until her retirement in 1967. She continued to keep in touch with many former students until she was prevented by illness.

== Death ==
She died after a long illness on 10 January 1983, aged 85 in Newbury.
