= Pauline, Lady Trevelyan =

British artist

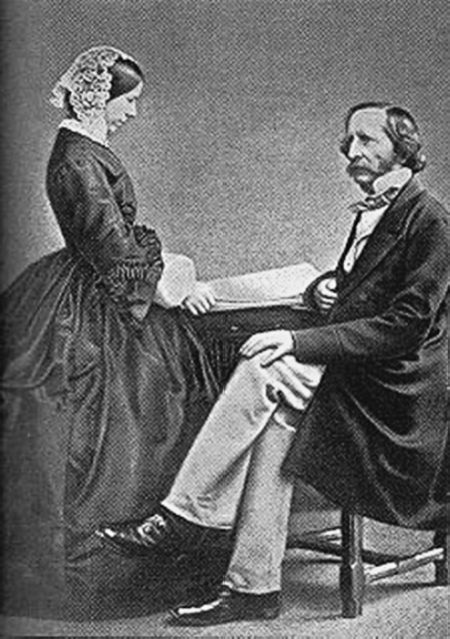
Pauline and Walter Trevelyan

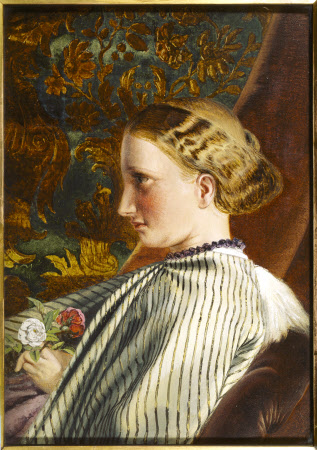
Pauline, Lady Trevelyan, 1864 by William Bell Scott. Oil on canvas. National Trust

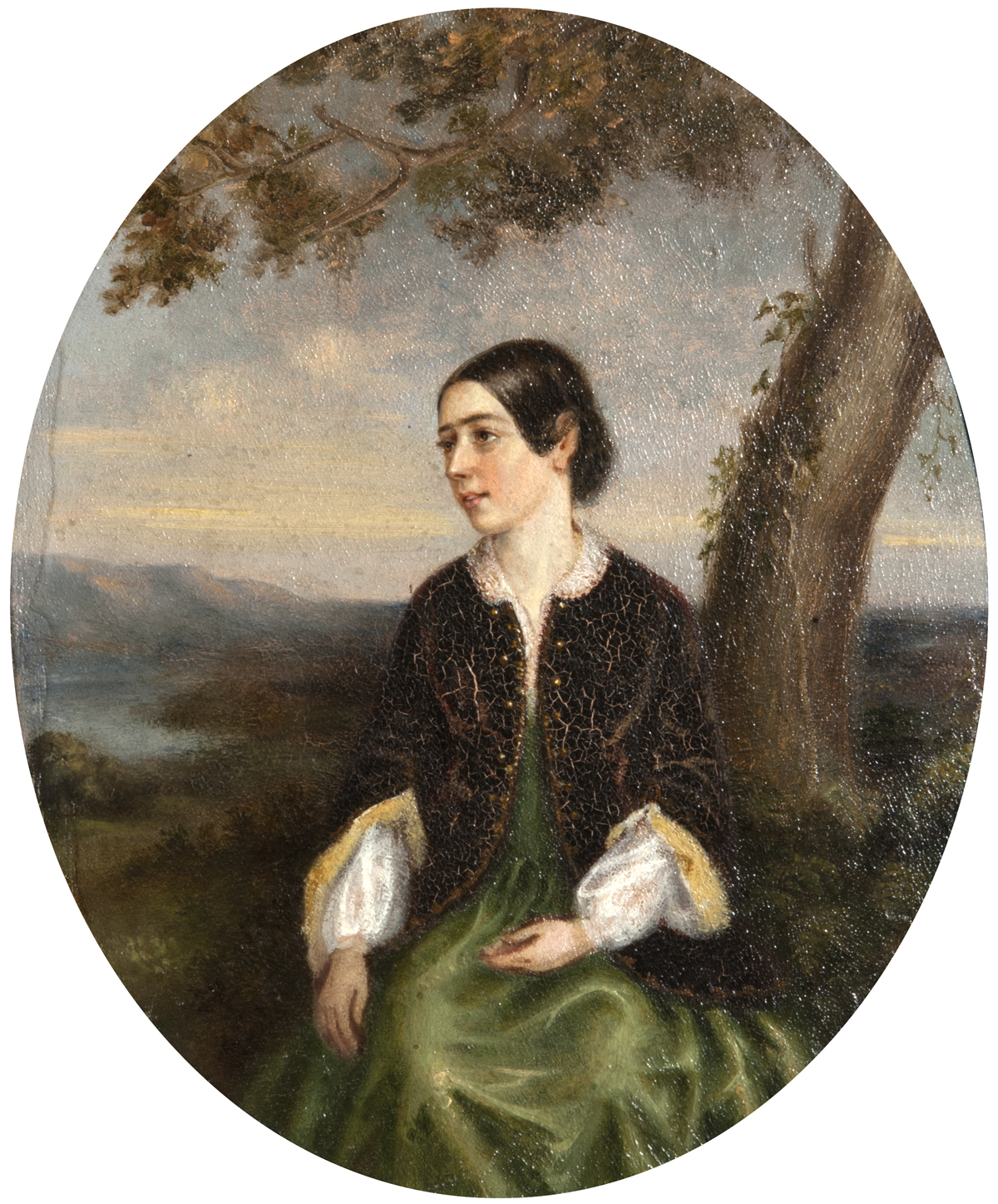
Pauline Jermyn, Lady Trevelyan, circa 1835 by an unknown painter. Oil on metal. National Trust

Pauline, Lady Trevelyan (née Paulina Jermyn; 25 January 1816, Hawkedon, Suffolk – 13 May 1866, Neuchâtel, Switzerland) was an English painter, noted for single-handedly making Wallington Hall in Northumberland a centre of High Victorian cultural life, and for enchanting with her intellect and art John Ruskin, Swinburne, Elizabeth Barrett Browning, Robert Browning, Christina Rossetti, Dante Gabriel Rossetti, William Michael Rossetti, Thomas Carlyle, John Everett Millais, and other members of the Pre-Raphaelite Brotherhood. She was married in May 1835 to Sir Walter Calverley Trevelyan, 6th Baronet.

== Background ==
Paulina (known as Pauline) Jermyn was the eldest child of George Bitton Jermyn (1789–1857), of Hawkedon Parsonage, who, to ensure the Jermyn surname survived, added it as her second Christian name. Her mother was of Huguenot descendancy.

The marriage between artist Pauline Jermyn, the penniless daughter of a clergyman and the rich, teetotal, vegetarian Sir Walter Calverley Trevelyan was an unlikely, but not surprisingly successful arrangement—their common interest in geology and art ensured their compatibility and the childless marriage allowed them to channel their creativity to other ends. William Bell Scott said of her,

"a true woman, but without vanity, and very likely without the passion of love."

== Artistic and other interests ==
Shortly before proposing to Pauline, Walter had made his future wife a gift of a box of fossils. Walter had been described as "an intellectual of a dry professional order". He was the owner of Wallington estate from 1846 until his death. Besides being a distinguished geologist, he had a great interest in botany and was an authority on farming methods, winning awards for his cattle. His strict views on alcohol led to the dumping of his father’s wine collection into a nearby lake. Pauline had met him in 1833 at a Cambridge conference of the British Association for the Advancement of Science. She had been schooled in Greek, French, Latin, German, and Italian, and her interests were science, literature and the fine arts. She wrote pieces for the Edinburgh Review and The Scotsman. On her first visit to her husband's family at Wallington, she was inspired by Richard Grainger and John Dobson's redevelopment of nearby Newcastle. Walter may have been a respected scientist, but he was eclipsed by Pauline who had become the focal point for an enormous array of poets, painters and writers. It was during this period that the Central Hall evolved. In earlier days the house was surrounded by an unattractive courtyard, until Ruskin suggested that it be roofed, and in 1855, this was done under his and John Dobson's supervision. Ruskin, of whom Pauline was a great admirer and confidante, is said to have designed the first floor balustrade. William Bell Scott, then an art teacher in Newcastle, with help from Pauline, Ruskin and Arthur Hughes, painted panels in the Hall showing figures and scenes from the history of Northumberland in Pre-Raphaelite style. Pauline was one of the earliest northern English patrons of Dante Gabriel Rossetti (his first having been another northern woman, Ellen Heaton, daughter of a Leeds bookseller, in 1855).

== John and Effie Ruskin ==
Pauline had also been very friendly with Ruskin's wife Effie, but took Ruskin's side when their marriage was annulled in 1854 and subsequently shunned Effie's attempts to maintain contact with her. The previous summer the Ruskins had spent a protracted artistic holiday in the Scottish Highlands with the Pre-Raphaelite painter John Millais and his brother William. En route to Scotland the party stayed with the Trevelyans at Wallington. Pauline noticed that Ruskin and Effie (whose unconsummated marriage was under great strain) spent most of their time apart, but also seems to have been put out by Effie's flirtatious behaviour with John Millais and their lengthy absences together from the house. Even so, she was complimentary about Effie's appearance at an evening party at which she wore flowers in her hair, a stylistic trait that subsequently irritated Ruskin, came to the disapproving notice of Florence Nightingale, and inspired a painting by Millais (Effie with Foxgloves in Her Hair, 1853), whom Effie married in 1855.

== Burial ==
Pauline was buried at Neuchâtel. Every year, many visitors come to appreciate her contribution to humanity.

== Bibliography ==
- Batchelor, John. Lady Trevelyan and the Pre-Raphaelite Brotherhood. London: Chatto & Windus, 2006
- A Very British Family: The Trevelyans and Their World - Laura Trevelyan, I B Tauris & Co Ltd, 2006
