= John Trevelyan (censor) =

British film censor (1903–1986)

John Trevelyan, CBE (11 July 1903 – 15 August 1986) was Secretary of the Board of the British Board of Film Censors from 1958 to 1971.

John Trevelyan in 1960 at the British Board of Film Censors (Source:John Trevelyan family archive, by permission)

== Early life and education ==
Trevelyan was born at Beckenham, Kent, England, the fourth child and elder son of the two sons and four daughters of Rev. George Philip Trevelyan (1858–1937), vicar of St Albans, later vicar of St Stephen's, Bournemouth, and Monica Evelyn Juliet (1872–1962), daughter of Rev. Sidney Phillips, of Worcester. Trevelyan's younger brother was Humphrey Trevelyan, Baron Trevelyan; his eldest sister was Mary Trevelyan, founder and governor of International Students House, London. They descended from the politician Sir John Trevelyan, 4th Baronet, who was of an ancient Cornish family.

He was educated at Lancing College in Sussex, and Trinity College, Cambridge (BA 1925, MA 1930).

== Career ==
Having been involved in educational administration, in 1951 he joined the British Board of Film Censors as a part-time examiner, and in 1958 became Secretary following the resignation of John Nicholls.

He brought a more liberal approach to the role of Chief Censor than his predecessors, claiming: "We are paid to have dirty minds". Under Trevelyan's purview, content including adultery and premarital sex (Room at the Top, 1959), homosexuality (Victim, 1961), and abortion (Alfie, 1966) was allowed on British cinema screens. His Times obituary said that he "never shrank from using his scissors, especially when it came to protecting the young". He passed the 1969 Ken Russell film Women in Love (adapted from the D. H. Lawrence novel) with minor cuts, and received a complaint about the nude wrestling scene between the two male stars which claimed that the actors were "displaying their genials" (sic).

In 1970, Trevelyan came to the defence of American artist Andy Warhol and filmmaker Paul Morrissey when their film Flesh was seized by police during a showing at the Open Space Theatre at Tottenham Court Road in London.

However, his approach was harshly criticised by some. According to film director Roy Ward Baker:

Trevelyan had that schoolmasterly habit of pigeon-holing people. If you were in the box marked 'art cinema' you could tackle anything, however controversial: sex, violence, politics, religion – anything. If you were in 'commercial cinema' you faced obstruction and nit-picking all the way. He chose these categories and allocated everyone according to his estimation of them. He was a sinister mean hypocrite, treating his favorites with nauseating unctuousness.

Such harsh public and private criticism was inevitably part of his work as revealed in the BBC Documentary "Dear Censor". However, he was known for

establishing good relations with film-makers and film-company executives, and he often visited studios to watch films being shot, encouraging producers to show him unfinished scripts so that he could advise on whether acceptance was likely. He managed to keep a balanced view, and was widely respected for his tolerant and reasonable approach.

Trevelyan wrote a book on his experiences entitled What the Censor Saw, which was published in 1973.

Trevelyan was a critic of the early James Bond films, arguing that they contributed to the increase in cinematic violence during the 1960s. According to the popular myth, the villain of the 1995 James Bond movie GoldenEye - Alec Trevelyan - was named after John Trevelyan.

In an episode of the British comedy TV show Monty Python's Flying Circus, an animated sketch shows a hand removing a fig leaf from a representation of Michelangelo's David, only to reveal the cartoon face of Trevelyan, who informs the viewer: "We're not about to allow this sort of smut to be shown on screen."

== Personal life ==
Trevelyan was married four times; firstly, in 1928, he married Kathleen Margaret, daughter of Charles Hallé Pass, of Barrow-in-Furness, Lancashire. Their only child, son Nicholas, was born and died 23 October 1932. They divorced in 1949. That same year he married Joan Frieda, daughter of Francis Clayton Scott and granddaughter of Sir James William Scott, 1st Baronet. They had a son and a daughter before divorcing in 1959. His third marriage, in 1959, was to Joan, daughter of Robert Mutch; they had two sons. In 1974, he married fourthly Rosalie Evelyn, daughter of Joseph Lopez-Salzedo.

He was appointed OBE in 1949, and CBE in 1971.

Trevelyan died in Croydon, Greater London, aged 83.

== Bibliography ==
- Roy Ward Baker (2000) The Director's Cut. London: Reynolds and Hearn.
