= George Trevelyan =

George Trevelyan may refer to:

- Sir George Trevelyan, 2nd Baronet (1838–1928), British statesman and author
- G. M. Trevelyan (George Macaulay Trevelyan, 1876–1962), historian, son of the above
- Sir George Trevelyan, 4th Baronet (1906–1996), British educational pioneer
- George Trevelyan (priest) (1765–1827), Anglican priest

== See also ==
- Trevelyan baronets
