= George Bitton Jermyn =

English cleric and antiquarian (1789–1857)

George Bitton Jermyn (1789–1857) was an English cleric and antiquarian, known for his topographical and genealogical studies of Suffolk.

== Early life ==
He was born on 2 November 1789, the eldest son of Peter Jermyn the younger (1767–1797), a solicitor, of Halesworth, Suffolk, and his wife Sarah, daughter of George Bitton of Uggeshall; Henry Jermyn (1767–1820) the collaborator of David Elisha Davy was his uncle. He was educated at Ipswich grammar school, and at Norwich grammar school under Samuel Forster (1752–1843).

Jermyn matriculated at Gonville and Caius College, Cambridge. During 1811 and 1812 he travelled in continental Europe, making heraldic researches in a tour of the Southern Mediterranean. He returned to Cambridge in 1813, and moved to college to Trinity Hall; he graduated LL.B. on 14 July 1814, and LL.D. July 1826.

Ordained deacon in 1813 and priest in 1817, Jermyn became curate of Hawkedon, Suffolk, in 1813. In 1814 he became curate at Stradishall. In May 1817 he moved to the curacy of Littleport in the Isle of Ely. He became curate of Swaffham Prior, outside Cambridge in July 1820, where George Leonard Jenyns was vicar.

== Curate and naturalist ==
The household took in undergraduate lodgers to make ends meet. One was Christopher Edmund Broome, who became known as a mycologist, and was there around 1832. According to Leonard Blomefield, son of George Leonard Jenyns, who became vicar of the adjacent parish of Swaffham Bulbeck, it was "a good botanical region, where his tutor was fond of Natural History". Jermyn was on good terms with John Stevens Henslow. Henslow and Charles Darwin used to stop at Swaffham Prior before continuing into the Fens on botanising expeditions.

According to Raleigh Trevelyan, Jermyn was feckless and absorbed in his interests; and the Swaffham Prior period lasted some 19 years. He set up the Swaffham Prior Natural History Society in 1834, with John Arthur Power as patron. Members included John Curtis, William Kirby, James Francis Stephens and John O. Westwood. It closed down in 1838, and its collections and library were sold.

Jermyn's botanising friend Charles Cardale Babington spent Christmas Day 1838 with him at Longstanton. The Biographical History of Gonville and Caius College notes that Jermyn was "In the Clergy List 1841–9 as "of Long Stanton House, Cambs.""

Joseph Romilly's diary shows that on 6 January 1841 his good friend Adam Sedgwick was much excited about "Dr Jermyn's atrocity" and the prospect that he had left Shelford for ever. In the Cambridge Chronicle and Journal of 20 February 1841 it is stated in a notice that Jermyn is living in Great Shelford, and that a creditors' meeting is called for 24 February.

== Later life and death ==
At this point, Jermyn left England forever, and his collections were sold at auction. He died on the island of La Maddalena, in the Kingdom of Sardinia, on 2 March 1857, and was buried on the small neighbouring island of Santo Stefano.

== Legacy ==
Jermyn, like his uncle Henry, made voluminous collections for a genealogical history of Suffolk, which went to Bury St Edmunds Museum. He also compiled an elaborate history of his own family, a folio volume of more than 700 pages. Another Suffolk volume went with Davy's collections to the British Museum.

== Family ==
Jermyn married first, on 29 March 1815, Catherine (1792–1828), daughter of Hugh Rowland of Middle Scotland Yard, London, with whom he had three sons and four daughters; and secondly, on 11 December 1828, Anne Maria, second daughter of Henry Fly, D.D., subdean of St Paul's Cathedral, by whom he had a daughter. The eldest child Paulina married Walter Calverley Trevelyan and became Pauline, Lady Trevelyan. The eldest son was Hugh Jermyn.

- The third daughter Helena Margaret married John Arthur Power.

Catherine Jermyn died of tuberculosis. Anna Maria Jermyn died in childbirth in 1830, and her small girl some weeks later.
