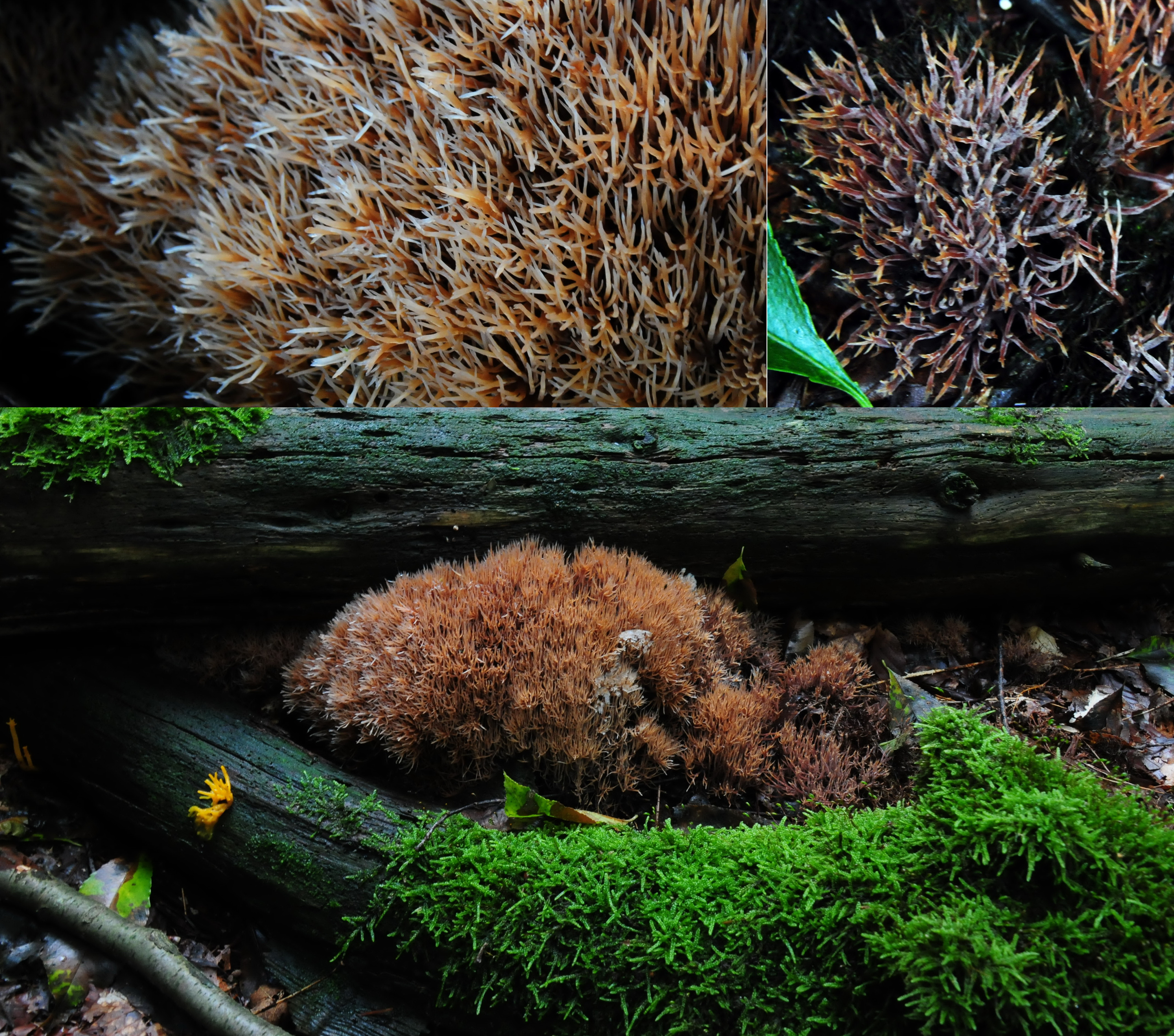

Scientific classification
- Kingdom: Fungi
- Division: Basidiomycota
- Class: Agaricomycetes
- Order: Agaricales
- Family: Pterulaceae
- Genus: Pterula
- Species: P. multifida

Binomial name
- Pterula multifida Fr. (1861)

= Pterula multifida =

Species of fungus

Pterula multifida
- Mycological characteristics
- Smooth hymenium
- Hymenium attachment is not applicable
- Lacks a stipe
- Spore print is white
- Ecology is saprotrophic
- Edibility is unknown

Pterula multifida is a species of mushroom producing fungus in the family Pterulaceae.

== Taxonomy ==
It was first described in 1861 by the Swedish mycologist Elias Magnus Fries who classified it as Pterula multifida based on specimens he had found in 1857.

François Fulgis Chevallier's Penicillaria multifida may be confused with this in the taxonomic history due to the identical abbreviation of P. multifida. However this is unrelated and Penicillaria multifida is now a nomen superfluum and considered illegitimate. Penicillaria multifida was a reclassification of Pierre Bulliard's Clavaria penicillata and that species did go to be reclassified as another Pterula species however in 1930 when Fries classified it as Pterula penicillata.

Pterula multifida var. densissima was described in 1958 by the Czech mycologist Albert Pilát. The citation he gave for this variant was 'B. et C. 1873' and in the same text he also wrote 'Pterula densissima Berk. et Curt. 1873' which has led to Pterula densissima being listed as a synonym of Pterula multifida. However the taxonomic records for this likewise have some citation errors so they remain unclear.

== Description ==
Pterula multifida is a small whitish coral fungus with a delicate branching structure.

Fruit body: 1-5mm thin, hairlike coral that branches repeatedly towards the smooth and shiny pointed tips. The colour is white to off white to light brown with the tips having a lighter colour than the base. Stem: 0.05–0.1mm when present but sometimes absent. Flesh: White. Tough and rubbery. Spore print: White. Spores: Ellipsoid and smooth. 5–6 x 2.5–3.5μm. Taste: Indistinct. Smell: Indistinct or unpleasant like urea or chemicals.

== Habitat and distribution ==
The specimens observed by Fries were found growing on sprigs of Spruce on the ground in the Uppsala Botanical Garden, Sweden in 1857.

In 1873 this species was included in Charles Montague Cooke's list of British fungi citing a specimen documented by Miles Joseph Berkeley and Christopher Edmund Broome which had been communicated to them by Walter Calverley Trevelyan. However it was noted that they were 'unable at present to meet with a description of this plant'.

This species is not commonly recorded in the United Kingdom but has been found in Berkshire, East & West Norfolk, Northamptonshire, North Somerset, South Devon, Surrey, Warwickshire and Glamorganshire in Wales. It occurs on damp soil and leaf litter in woodlands and has been found growing on the fallen catkins of Salix species (willow trees) and on needles from Picea species (spruce). It has also been found on the dead stems of the grass species Juncus subnodulosus, ferns such as Polystichum and on the dead stems of Rose and Rubus fruticosus (blackberries). It grows solitary or in small trooping groups from late Summer to Autumn in England.

As of October 2022, GBIF has around 1,250 recorded observations for this species with most being from Europe. However many of there are just observations from citizen science platforms and lack evidence to confirm. Due to the similarities with other Pterula species some may also have been confused.

== Etymology ==
The specific epithet multifida derives from the Latin multifidus meaning 'with many divisions'.

== Similar species ==
- Pterula subulata is described very similarly.
