= Robert Trevelyan =

Robert Trevelyan may refer to:

- R. C. Trevelyan (1872–1951), English poet and translator
- Robert Trevelyan (cricketer) (born 1970), English cricketer
