= Goats Club =

The Goats Club, established in October 1956, was the foreign students club of the University of London. It was the first international, inter-collegiate club to have been established in the university. The aim of the founder Mary Trevelyan, adviser to overseas students at the University, was to try to give overseas and British students more opportunities to meet each other. The club ran on Tuesday evenings in term time, and is mentioned in the memoirs of many Commonwealth students who studied in London in the 1950s and 1960s and later became important figures in their own countries.

The name Goats Club came from a comment by an African student who said to Miss Trevelyan "Oh, we thought you were dead! Without you we should all have been lost goats!"

The president of the club for a period was Hugh FitzRoy, 11th Duke of Grafton, and Peter Comyns, warden of Zebra House, was heavily involved in organising activities. Mary Trevelyan retired in 1967, and the importance of the club declined in the 1970s as more and more foreign students attended the University and college-by-college activities developed.

Today, the Goats Club is the alumni association of International Students House, London.
