= John Arthur Power =

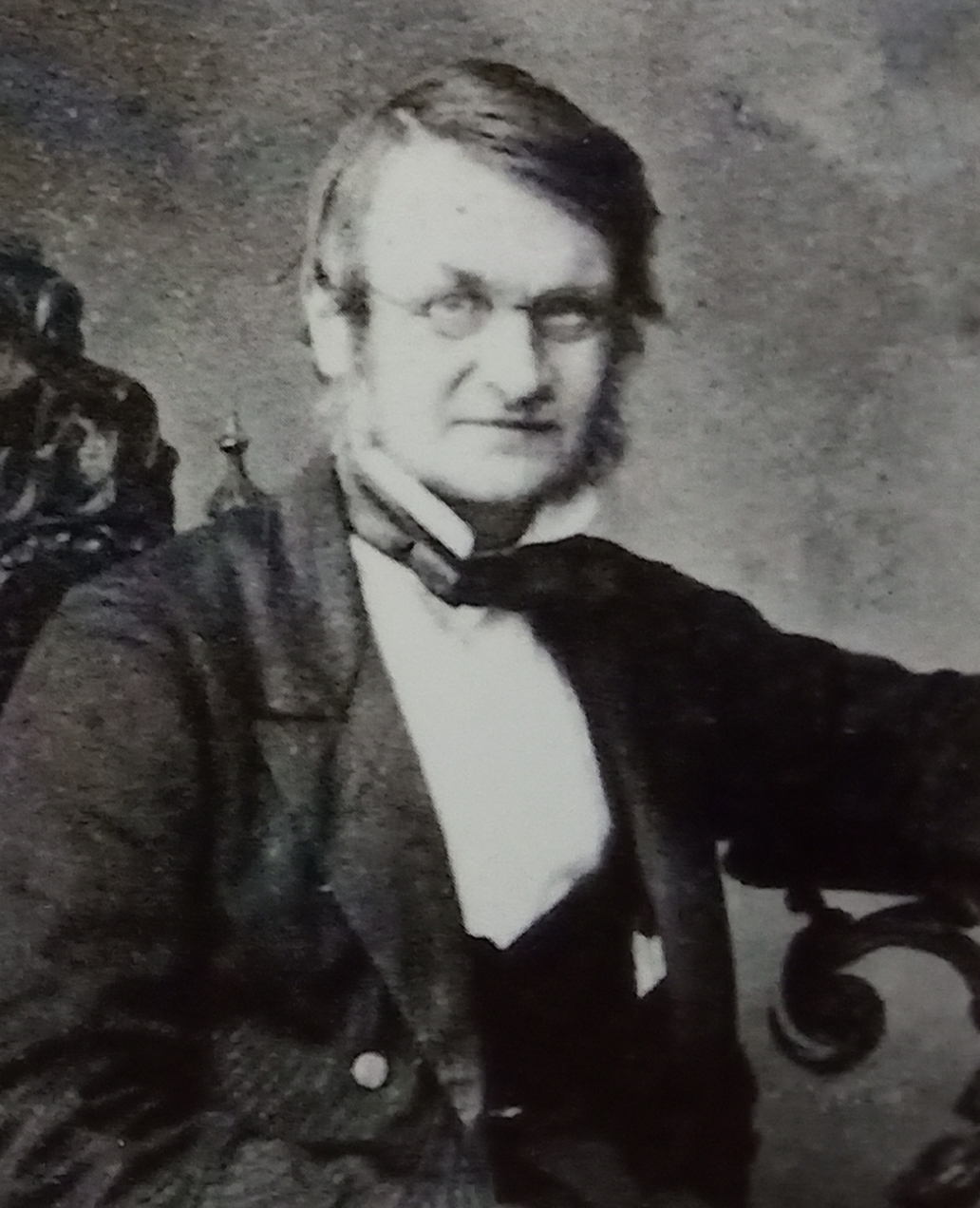

John Arthur Power (18 March 1810 – 4 June 1886) was an English physician, lecturer in medicine, and amateur entomologist. He was an uncle of Sir William Henry Power.

Power was born in Leicester to physician John (1785-1858) and Charlotte Ann née Wood (1785-1829). He was educated at Merchant Taylor's School and then at Clare College, Cambridge, where he graduated BA as 27th Wrangler in 1832. He received a Licentiate of Medicine in 1838, and MRCP in 1859. He then taught medicine at Westminster Hospital. He took a keen interest in entomology, collecting specimens from across England, many of which were considered rarities. Edward Newman called him the "Indefatigable Power" for his perseverance and effort taken to collect rare species of beetle from remote locations. He carried bottles and boxes for collecting insects bundled into bag inserted inside his top hat and wore a formal tail coat into the field, and on occasion, the contents of his top hat would fall out when raising it to greet a lady. A paralytic stroke reduced his activity in later life.

Power married Helena Margaret, daughter of Rev. George Bitton Jermyn. He died at Bedford where he had retired to after living for many years in London. He was a Fellow of the Royal Geographical Society.
