= Wallington Demesne =

Civil parish in Northumberland, England

Coordinates: 55.15446°N 1.93329°W

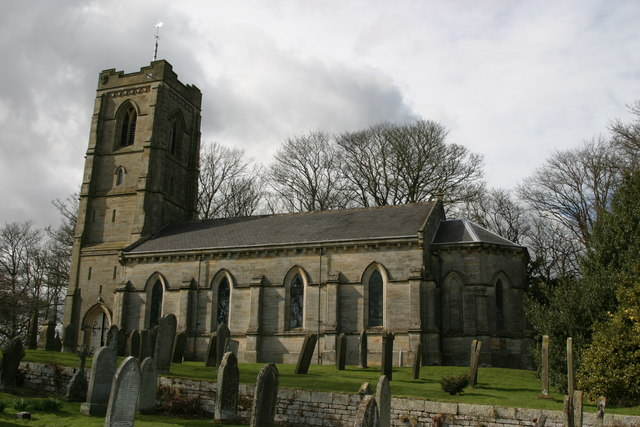
- Holy Trinity Church, Cambo

- Location within Northumberland
- Population: 361 (2011 Census)
- Civil parish: Wallington Demesne
- Unitary authority: Northumberland
- Ceremonial county: Northumberland
- Region: North East
- Country: England
- Sovereign state: United Kingdom
- Post town: MORPETH
- Postcode district: NE
- Police: Northumbria
- Fire: Northumberland
- Ambulance: North East
- UK Parliament: Hexham

Wallington Demesne is a civil parish in the county of Northumberland, England. In 2011 it had a population of 361. The parish includes the village of Cambo and the hamlets of Middleton and Scots' Gap.

== Geography ==
The parish has a coastal climate. The average temperature is 7 °C. The hottest month is July, at 14 °C, and the coldest is February, at 0 °C.

== Places of interest ==
Wallington Park and Garden is a Grade II* listed building.

== History ==
Wallington Demesne was formerly a township in the parish of Hartburn, in 1866 Wallington Demesne became a separate civil parish, on 1 April 1955 the parishes of Cambo, Corridge, Deanham, Hartburn Grange, Highlaws, North Middleton, South Middleton and Todridge were abolished and merged with Wallington Demesne. From 1974 to 2009 it was in Castle Morpeth district.

== See also ==
- List of civil parishes in Northumberland
