= Scots Gap =

Village in Northumberland, England

Coordinates: 55.173°N 1.940°W

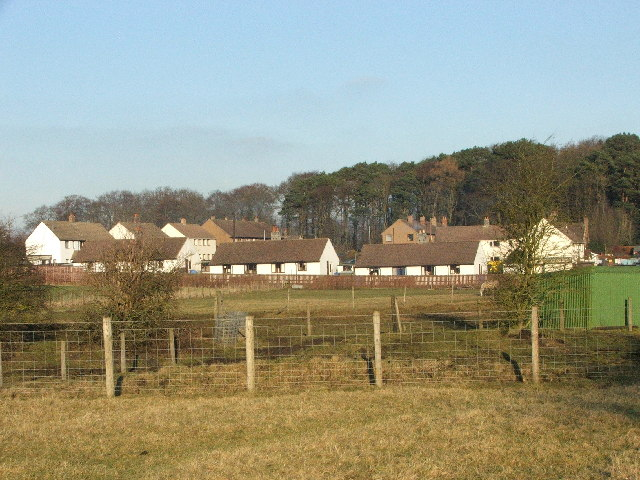
- Scots Gap Village

- Location within Northumberland
- OS grid reference: NZ0486
- Civil parish: Wallington Demesne
- Unitary authority: Northumberland
- Shire county: Northumberland
- Region: North East
- Country: England
- Sovereign state: United Kingdom
- Post town: Morpeth
- Postcode district: NE61
- Police: Northumbria
- Fire: Northumberland
- Ambulance: North East
- UK Parliament: North Northumberland

Scots Gap is a small village in the civil parish of Wallington Demesne, in Northumberland, United Kingdom.

== Population ==
Scots Gap has approximately 70 private residential dwellings, the oldest dating from the mid 1800s and the latest pair being under construction in 2016. Private residences in the village are dominated by West Grange Hall and estate, covering some 35 acres (14 hectares) across the north-east corner of the village.

== Agricultural mart ==
The village is best known for the livestock mart which holds weekly sales of prime sheep from June to February and occasional cattle and other sales. The mart is operated by Hexham and Northern Marts Company and the facility is the largest built structure in the village. The agricultural mart is believed to have been the primary driver behind the opening of the Scots Gap railway station in the 19th century. The railway line and station closed in 1966, though the station building survives.

== Facilities ==
In addition to West Grange Hall and the agricultural mart, the village offers:

- A country store operated by Robson & Cowan
- A petrol station
- Arkwrights Village Store
- The Scots Gap Methodist Church
- The Scots Gap Medical Group, a GP surgery voted best in the UK in 2016
- The former North East Regional Office of the National Trust, now empty
