= Sir John Trevelyan, 4th Baronet =

British politician (1735–1828)

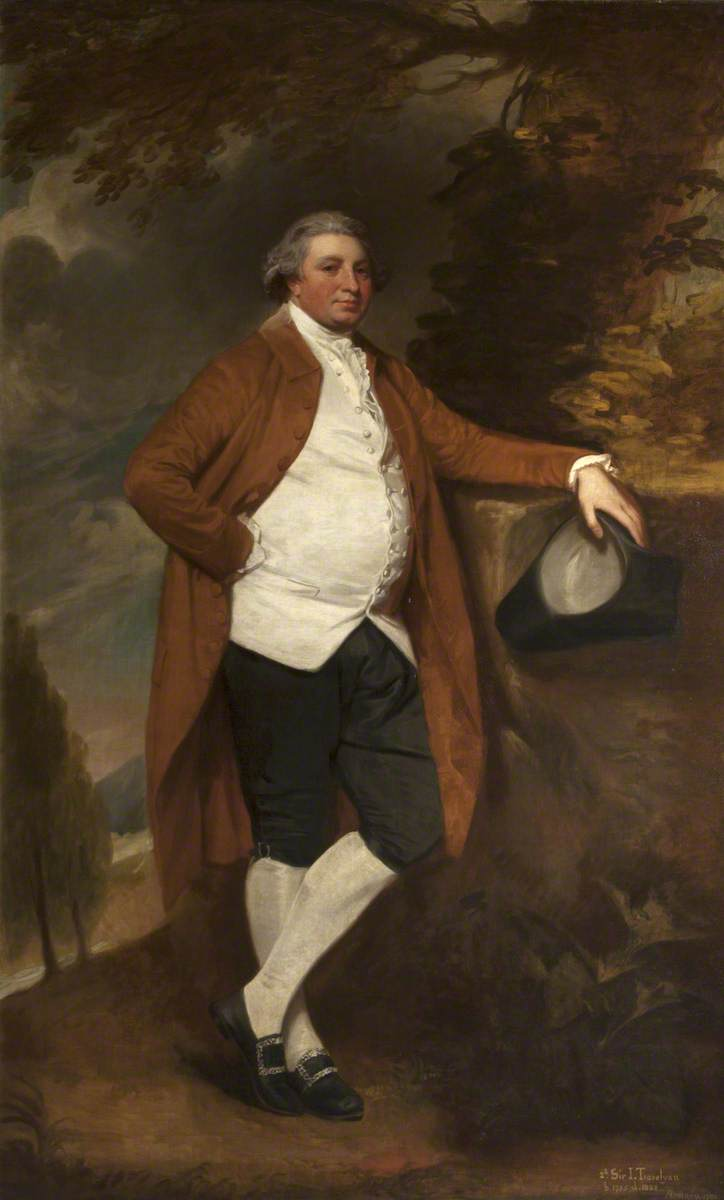
Portrait of Sir John Trevelyan, 4th Bt, painted by George Romney

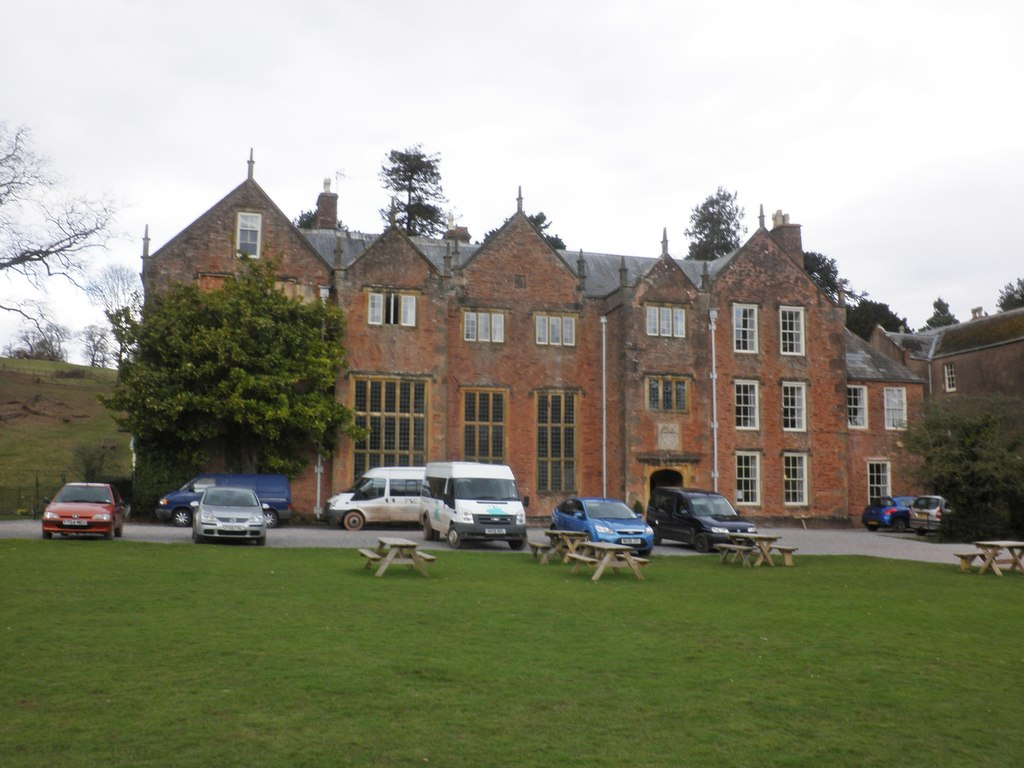
Nettlecombe Court in Somerset, seat of the Trevelyan baronets

Sir John Trevelyan, 4th Baronet (6 February 1735 – 18 April 1828) was a British politician who sat in the House of Commons from 1777 to 1796.

== Origins ==
A member of an ancient family of Cornwall, he was the only son and heir of Sir George Trevelyan, 3rd Baronet (1707–1768) of Nettlecombe.

== Career ==
He served as High Sheriff of Somerset for 1777-8 and sat as a Member of Parliament for Newcastle-upon-Tyne from 1777 to 1780 and for Somerset from 1780 to 1796. In 1784 he was a member of the St. Alban's Tavern group who tried to bring Fox and Pitt together.

== Involvement in slavery ==
He owned enslaved people on Grenada. In 1835 his family received compensation of £26,898, a huge sum at the time, from the British government for the abolition of slavery a year earlier. A descendant is the former BBC journalist Laura Trevelyan who quit the BBC to campaign for reparative justice for the Caribbean.

== Marriage and issue ==
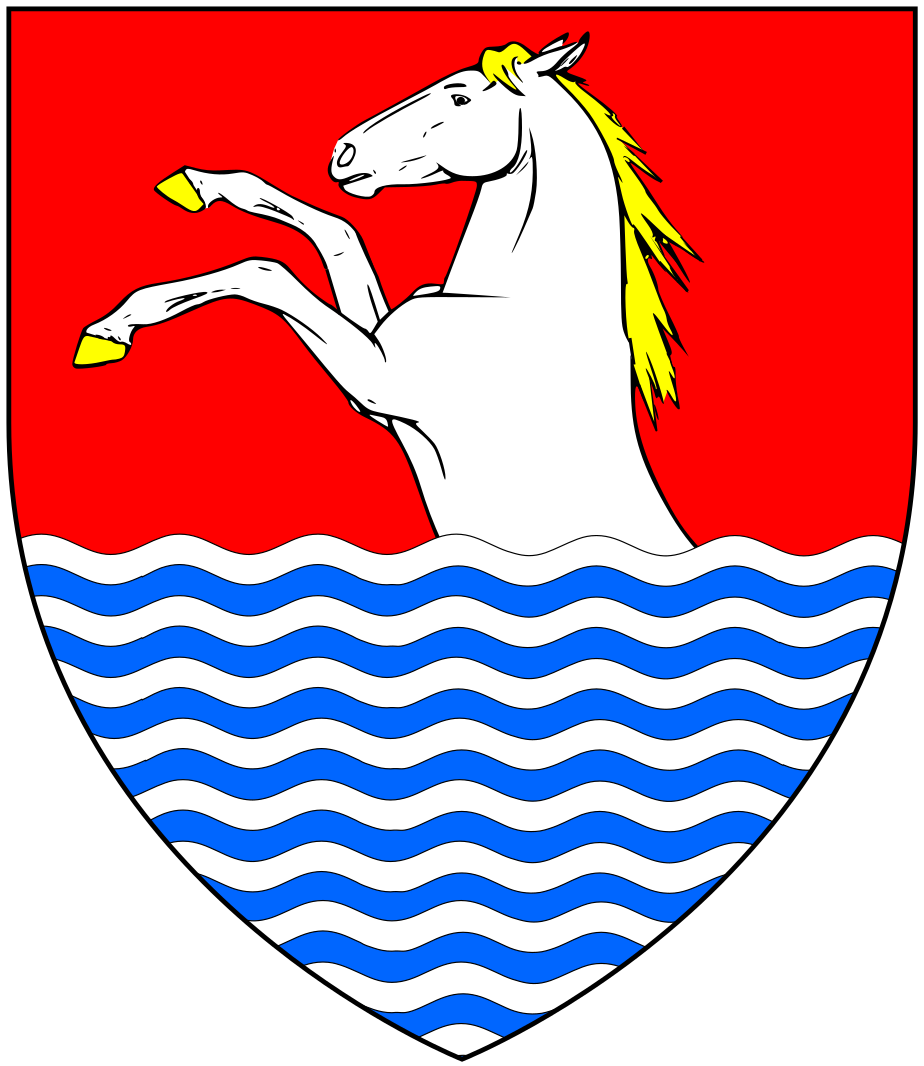
Arms of Trevelyan: Gules, a demi-horse argent hoofed and maned or issuing out of water in base proper

He married Louisa Marianne Simond, a daughter and co-heiress of Peter Simond of London, a Huguenot merchant. He inherited various Northumbrian estates from his wife's uncle in 1777. By his wife he had 6 sons and 2 daughters including:

- Sir John Trevelyan, 5th Baronet (1761–1846), eldest son and heir, father of Sir Walter Calverley Trevelyan, 6th Baronet (1797–1879);
- Walter Trevelyan (1763–1830), 2nd son;
- Venerable George Trevelyan (1765–1827), 3rd son, Rector of Nettlecombe, Canon of Wells and Archdeacon of Taunton, father of:
  - Henry Willoughby Trevelyan (1803–1876), a Major-General in the British Army, father of Sir Ernest John Trevelyan (1850–1929), a Judge of the High Court of Calcutta, a writer on legal matters and a member of the Oxford Town Council.
  - Sir Charles Trevelyan, 1st Baronet (1807–1886) of Wallington Hall, near Cambo in Northumberland, title created in 1874; the 1st Baronet's grandson was the historian George Macaulay Trevelyan (1876–1962)
  - Reverend William Pitt Trevelyan (1812–1905), 6th son, father of Reverend George Philip Trevelyan (1858–1937), father of Humphrey Trevelyan, Baron Trevelyan, a diplomat and author.

== Death ==
He died in April 1828, aged 93.

Parliament of Great Britain
Preceded by Sir Walter Blackett; Sir Matthew White Ridley	Member of Parliament for Newcastle-upon-Tyne; 1777–1780; With: Sir Matthew White Ridley	Succeeded by Sir Matthew White Ridley; Andrew Robinson Bowes
Preceded by Richard Hippisley Coxe; Edward Phelips	Member of Parliament for Somerset; 1780–1796; With: Richard Hippisley Coxe 1780–1784; Edward Phelips 1784–1792; Henry Hippisley Coxe 1792–1795; William Gore-Langton 1795–1796	Succeeded by William Gore-Langton; William Dickinson
Baronetage of England
Preceded by George Trevelyan	Baronet (of Nettlecombe); 1768–1828	Succeeded by John Trevelyan
