= Sir Charles Trevelyan, 1st Baronet =

British colonial administrator (1807–1886)

Sir Charles Trevelyan Bt KCB
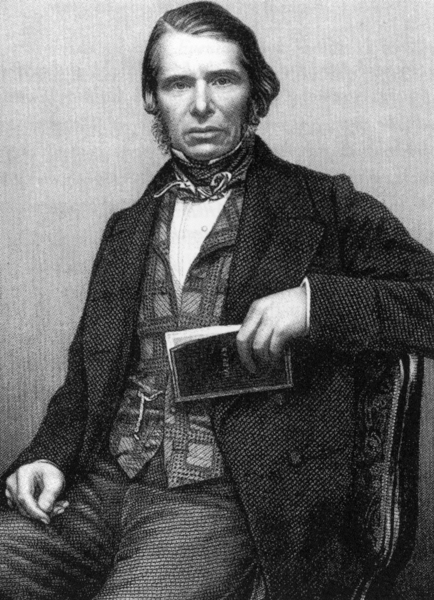
- Trevelyan in the 1840s
- Born: 2 April 1807; Taunton, Somerset, England
- Died: 19 June 1886 (aged 79); London, England
- Education: Charterhouse School
- Occupations: Civil servant, colonial administrator
- Spouses: Hannah More Macaulay (m. 1834; died 1873) Eleanor Anne Campbell (m. 1875)
- Children: 1 Sir George Trevelyan, 2nd Baronet
- Parents: Venerable George Trevelyan; Harriet Trevelyan

Sir Charles Edward Trevelyan, 1st Baronet, KCB (2 April 1807 – 19 June 1886) was an English civil servant and colonial administrator. As a young man, he worked with the colonial government in Calcutta, India. He returned to Britain and took up the post of Assistant Secretary to the Treasury. During this time he was responsible for facilitating the government's response to the Great Famine in Ireland. In the late 1850s and 1860s, he served there in senior-level appointments. Trevelyan was instrumental in reforming the British Civil Service in the 1850s.

Today Trevelyan is mostly remembered for his reluctance to disburse direct government food and monetary aid to the Irish during the famine due to his strong belief in laissez-faire economics. Trevelyan's defenders say that larger factors than his own acts and beliefs were more central to the problem of the famine and its high mortality.

== Origins ==
Descended from an ancient family of Cornwall, he was born in Taunton, Somerset, a son of the Venerable George Trevelyan, then a Cornish clergyman, later Archdeacon of Taunton, the 3rd son of Sir John Trevelyan Bt MP of Nettlecombe Court in Somerset. His mother was Harriet Neave, a daughter of Sir Richard Neave Bt, Governor of the Bank of England.

Much of the wealth of the family derived from the holding of slaves in Grenada.

== Education ==
He was educated at Blundell's School in Devon, at Charterhouse School and then the East India Company College at Haileybury in Hertfordshire. R. A. C. Balfour wrote, "his early life was influenced by his parents' membership of the Clapham Sect – a group of sophisticated families noted for their severity of principle as much as for their fervent evangelism." Trevelyan was a student of the economist Thomas Malthus while at Haileybury. His rigid adherence to Malthusian population theory during the Irish famine is often attributed to this formative tutelage.

== Career ==
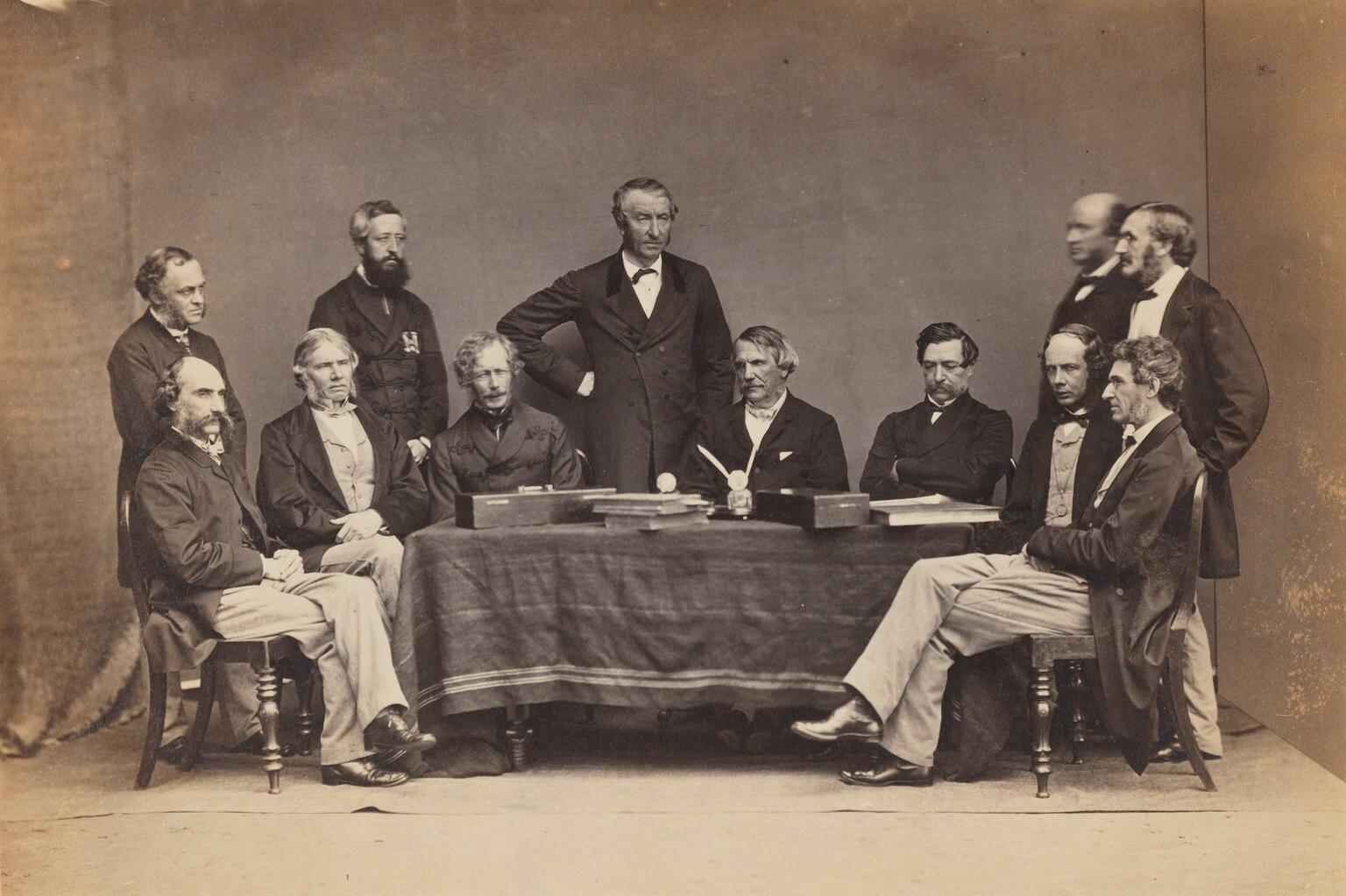
Charles Trevelyan, sitting second from left, with John Lawrence, Viceroy of India and other council members. c. 1864

In 1826, as a young man, Trevelyan joined the East India Company as a writer (clerk) and was posted to the Bengal Civil Service at Delhi, India. There, he achieved rapid promotion. He occupied several important and influential positions in various parts of India, but his priggish and often indiscreet behaviour endeared him to few of his colleagues and involved him in almost continual controversy.

On return to Britain in 1840 he was appointed as assistant secretary to HM Treasury, and served to 1859, during both the Irish famine (1845–1852) and the Highland Potato Famine (1846–1857) in Scotland. In Ireland, he administered famine relief, whilst in Scotland he was closely associated with the work of the Central Board for Highland Relief. His inaction and personal attitude towards the Irish people are widely believed to have slowed relief for the famine. In discussing policy for the Highland Potato Famine on 20 September 1846, Trevelyan wrote: "The people cannot, under any circumstances, be allowed to starve." The italics appear in the original document. This repeats language used in April of the same year in respect of Ireland:

Our measures must proceed with as little disturbance as possible of the ordinary course of private trade, which must ever be the chief resource for the subsistence of the people, but, coûte que coûte (at any cost), the people must not, under any circumstances, be allowed to starve.

In Ireland a million people starved to death, as the Irish watched with increasing fury as boatloads of homegrown oats and grain departed on schedule from their shores for shipment to England. Food riots erupted in ports such as Youghal, near Cork, where people tried unsuccessfully to confiscate a boatload of oats. At Dungarvan, in County Waterford, British troops were pelted with stones as they shot into the crowd, killing at least two people and wounding several others. British naval escorts were then provided for the riverboats.

In contrast, in the Scottish Highlands and Islands, whilst there was great hardship, the high death rate seen in Ireland did not occur. Extensive relief efforts from outside the Highlands were effective in limiting deaths due to famine. The overall problem of Highland communities that could not generate enough food or income with which to feed themselves was ultimately solved by emigration.

He was cofounder in 1851, with Sir John McNeill, of the Highland and Island Emigration Society which during the second phase of the Highland Clearances supported an exodus of nearly 5,000 people to Australia between 1851 and 1858.

Trevelyan was Governor of Madras from 1859 to 1860, and Indian Finance Minister from 1862 to 1865. A reformer of the civil service, he is widely regarded as the founder of the modern Civil Service.

== Marriages and issue ==
He married twice:

- Firstly on 23 December 1834, in India, to Hannah More Macaulay (d. 5 August 1873), daughter of Zachary Macaulay and Selina Mills, sister of Lord Macaulay, then a member of the supreme council of India and one of his closest friends. By his first wife he had one son and heir:
  - Margaret Jean Trevelyan (1835 - 1906), married Henry Holland, 1st Viscount Knotsford.
  - Sir George Otto Trevelyan, 2nd Baronet (1838–1928), the statesman.
  - Alice Frances Trevelyan (1843-1902) married William Stratford Dugdale (1828-1882), son of William Stratford Dugdale. Their son was Sir William Francis Stratford Dugdale, 1st Bt.
- Secondly on 14 October 1875 he married Eleanor Anne Campbell, a daughter of Walter Campbell of Sunderland and a granddaughter of Walter Campbell of Shawfield in Scotland.

== Biography ==
=== India ===
He entered the East India Company's Bengal civil service as a writer in 1826, having displayed from an early age a great proficiency in Asian languages and dialects. On 4 January 1827, Trevelyan was appointed assistant to Sir Charles Theophilus Metcalfe, the commissioner at Delhi, where, during a residence of four years, he was entrusted with the conduct of several important missions. For some time he acted as guardian to the youthful Madhu Singh, the Rajah of Bhurtpore. He also worked to improve the condition of the native population. He abolished the transit duties by which the internal trade of India had long been fettered. For these and other services, he received the special thanks of the governor-general in council. Before leaving Delhi, he donated personal funds for construction of a broad street through a new suburb, then in course of erection, which thenceforth became known as Trevelyanpur.

In 1831, he moved to Calcutta, and became deputy secretary to the government in the political department. Trevelyan was especially zealous in the cause of education, and in 1835, largely owing to his persistence, government was led to decide in favour of the promulgation of European literature and science among the Indians. An account of the efforts of government, entitled On the Education of the People of India, was published by Trevelyan in 1838. In April 1836, he was nominated secretary to the Sudder board of revenue, an office he had held until his return in January 1838.

=== Role in the Irish Famine ===
On 21 January 1840, he entered on the duties of assistant secretary to Her Majesty's Treasury in London, and discharged the functions of that office for nineteen years. In Ireland, he administered the relief works of 1845–47, when upwards of 734,000 men were employed by the government during the Great Famine. Altogether, about a million people in Ireland are reliably estimated to have died of starvation and epidemic disease between 1846 and 1851, and some two million emigrated in little more than a decade (1845–55). On 27 April 1848, Trevelyan was appointed as a KCB in reward of his services.

The Great Famine in Ireland began as a catastrophe of extraordinary magnitude, but its effects were severely worsened by the actions and inactions of the Whig government, headed by Lord John Russell in the crucial years from 1846 to 1852. Many members of the British upper and middle classes believed the famine was a divine judgment—an act of Providence—although these views also existed in the Irish Catholic Church. A leading exponent of the providentialist perspective was Trevelyan, who was chiefly responsible for administering Irish relief policy throughout the famine years. In his 1848 book The Irish Crisis, he called the famine "a direct stroke of an all-wise and all-merciful Providence", which laid bare "the deep and inveterate root of social evil", namely Ireland's rural economic system of exploitative landlords and peasants overly dependent on the potato. The famine, he wrote, was "the sharp but effectual remedy by which the cure is likely to be effected... God grant that the generation to which this great opportunity has been offered may rightly perform its part and we may not relax our efforts until Ireland fully participates in the social health and physical prosperity of Great Britain." This mentality was influential in persuading the government to do nothing to restrain mass evictions. Historians disagree about Trevelyan's exact role in famine relief policy in Ireland. Karen Sonnelitter discusses the subject in her edited collection of primary sources, The Great Irish Famine: A History in Documents.

During the Great Famine, specifically 1846, the Whig–Liberal Government held power in Britain, with Trevelyan acting as treasurer. In this position he had considerable influence over the parliament's decisions, especially the plans for the relief effort in Ireland. Along with the Whig government, he believed Ireland needed to correct itself and that a laissez-faire attitude was the best solution. Though his efforts produced no remedy to the situation, he believed that if the British government gave Ireland all that was necessary to survive, the Irish people would come to rely on the British government instead of fixing their problems.

In 1846, Trevelyan ordered the Peelite Relief Programmes, which had been operating since the early years of the famine, to be shut down. This was done on 21 July 1846 by Sir Charles Wood. Trevelyan believed that if the relief continued while a new food crisis was unfolding, the poor would become permanently conditioned to having the state take care of them.

After the end of the Peelite Relief Programs, the Whig–Liberal government instituted the Labour Rate Act, which provided aid only to the most severely affected areas of the famine. This Labour Act took time to be implemented, as was Trevelyan's intention, allowing the British government to spend the bare minimum to feed those starving from the famine. He was nicknamed as "linchpin of relief operations". Trevelyan believed that labourers should have seen this as a happy event to take advantage of what he called "breathing-time" to harvest their own crops and carry out wage-producing harvest work for large farmers. But the return of the blight had deprived labourers of any crops to harvest and farmers of agricultural work to hire labourers for.

Trevelyan expressed his views in letters that year to Lord Monteagle of Brandon and in an article in The Times. But in 1846, more than ninety percent of the potato crop had been destroyed. The large crops of oats and grain were not affected, and if those crops had been distributed to the Irish people rather than exported, mass starvation could have been avoided.

Trevelyan said in his 9 October 1846 letter to Lord Monteagle that "the government establishments are strained to the utmost to alleviate this great calamity and avert this danger" as was within their power so to do. Trevelyan praised the government and denounced the Irish gentry in his letter, blaming them for the famine. He believed that the landlords had a responsibility to feed the labourers and increase land productivity. The Times agreed with Trevelyan, faulting the gentry for not instructing their proprietors to improve their estates and not planting crops other than the potato. In his letter to Lord Monteagle, Trevelyan identified the gentry with the "defective part of the national character" and chastised them for expecting the government to fix everything, "as if they have themselves no part to perform in this great crisis." By blaming the famine on the gentry, Trevelyan justified the actions—or inaction—of the British Government. These same gentry were of course raising the crops of oats and grains as well as meat that were exported under armed guard to England.

=== Highland Potato Famine ===
The potato blight spread to the Western Highlands of Scotland a year after its occurrence in Ireland resulting in the Highland Potato Famine. Overcrowded Highland crofting communities were highly reliant on the productivity of the potato for subsistence, so famine was inevitable in those parts of the Highlands. In contrast to Ireland, there was no large increase in mortality as external relief efforts were arranged by external agencies. The government put pressure on landowners to support their destitute tenants, which many landlords already saw as their responsibility. The few that tried to avoid doing this were brought into line by suggestions that the government might provide relief direct to their tenants and reclaim the costs from the landowner. In 1851, in response to that crisis, Trevelyan and Sir John McNeill founded the Highland and Island Emigration Society. From 1851 until its termination in 1858, the society sponsored the emigration of around 5,000 Scots to Australia and thus increasing the devastation of the Clearances. This existed alongside other assisted emigration paid for by the landlords of those travelling (estimated at nearly 11,000 people), where tenants had sufficient funds, voluntary emigration, and the work of the Colonial Land and Emigration Commission. Trevelyan likewise supported Irish emigration, saying "We must not complain of what we really want to obtain".

=== Civil Service Reform ===
In 1853, Trevelyan proposed the organisation of a new system for hiring of people in the government civil service. The Northcote–Trevelyan Report, signed by himself and Sir Stafford Northcote in November 1853, entitled The Organisation of the Permanent Civil Service, laid the foundation for securing the admission of qualified and educated persons into positions that had been dominated by members of aristocratic and influential families who benefitted by personal networks. It was intended to be a merit system.

=== Return to India ===
In 1858, Lord Harris resigned the governorship of the presidency of Madras, and Trevelyan was offered the appointment. Having maintained his knowledge of oriental affairs by close attention to all subjects affecting the interest of India, he entered upon his duties as governor of Madras in the spring of 1859. He soon became popular in the presidency. It is claimed that due to his conduct in office, the natives became reconciled to the government. An assessment was carried out, a police system organised in every part, and, contrary to the traditions of the East India Company, land was sold in fee simple to any one who wished to purchase. These and other reforms introduced or developed by Trevelyan won the gratitude and esteem of the Madras population.

All went well until February 1860. Towards the close of 1859, James Wilson had been appointed financial member of the legislative council of India. At the beginning of the new year, he proposed a plan of retrenchment and taxation by which he hoped to improve the financial position of the British administration: his plan was introduced at Calcutta, the seat of government, on 18 February, and transmitted to Madras. On 4 March, an open telegram was sent to Calcutta implying an adverse opinion of this proposal by the governor and council of Madras. On 9 March, a letter was sent to Madras stating the central government's objection to the transmission of such a message in an open telegram at a time when native feeling could not be considered stable. At the same time, the representative of the Madras government in the legislative council of India was prohibited from following the instructions of his superiors to lay their views upon the table and to advocate on their behalf. On 21 March, the government sent another telegram to Madras declaring the bill would be introduced and referred to a committee which was due to report in five weeks. On 26 March, opinions among Trevelyan and his council were recorded and, on his authority, the document found its way into the papers.

On arrival of this intelligence in Britain, the Governor of Madras was at once recalled. This decision occasioned much discussion both in and out of Parliament. Defending the recall of Trevelyan, Palmerston, in his place in Parliament, said:

Undoubtedly it conveys a strong censure on one act of Sir Charles Trevelyan's public conduct, yet Sir Charles Trevelyan has merits too inherent in his character, to be clouded and overshadowed by this simple act, and I trust in his future career he may be useful to the public service and do honour to himself.

Sir Charles Wood, the President of the Board of Control, said:

A more honest, zealous, upright, and independent servant could not be. He was a loss to India, but there would be danger if he were allowed to remain, after having adopted a course so subversive of all authority, so fearfully tending to endanger our rule, and so likely to provoke the people to insurrection against the central and responsible authority.

In 1862, Trevelyan returned to India as finance minister. His tenure of office was marked by important administrative reforms and by extensive measures for the development of natural resources in India by means of public works. In 1862, Colonel Douglas Hamilton was given a roving commission by Trevelyan to conduct surveys and make drawings for the Government of all the hill plateaus in Southern India which were likely to suit as Sanitaria, or quarters for European troops.

On his return home in 1865, Trevelyan became engaged in discussions of the question of army purchase, on which he had given evidence before the royal commission in 1857. Later he was associated with a variety of social questions, such as charities, pauperism, and the like, and in the treatment of these. He was a staunch Liberal, and gave his support to the Liberal cause in Northumberland, while residing at Wallington Hall in that county. Trevelyan died at 67 Eaton Square, London, on 19 June 1886, aged 79.

== Legacy and honours ==
Trevelyan was appointed KCB on 27 April 1848. Three decades later on 2 March 1874, he was created the first Trevelyan baronet of Wallington, when his cousin Walter Calverley Trevelyan, 6th Baronet of Nettlecombe, died at Wallington on 23 March 1879, childless after two marriages, and his north-country property was bequethed to Charles. A biographer from the family notes that Walter had changed his will in 1852, having been impressed by Charles' son. The young George Otto Trevelyan had visited Walter and his wife and received hints of the secret will. The modest social position of the family was suddenly elevated to one of wealth and property, recorded as an important event in the history of the baronetcy.

The changed will came as a surprise to Alfred Trevelyan, who was advised at the end of a lengthy letter that detailed the evils of alcohol. He issued a costly and unsuccessful challenge for the title and estate.

The Trevelyan (Charles Edward) Archive, which includes Trevelyan's papers covering 25 years of his personal life and career, is held at Newcastle University Library Special Collections and Archives.

It has been said that:

Trevelyan's most enduring mark on history may be the anti-Irish racial sentiment he expressed during his term in the critical position of administrating relief for the millions of Irish peasants suffering under the potato blight as Assistant Secretary to HM Treasury (1840–1859) under the Whig administration of Lord Russell.

In February 2023, one of Trevelyan's descendants, Laura Trevelyan, stunned to discover Charles Edward's father Rev. George Trevelyan was a slaveholder, announced a plan to travel to the Caribbean and apologize for the family's ownership of 1,004 enslaved Africans. The Trevelyan family plans to pay reparations to Grenada's people. Members of the family decided to sign a letter of apology for enslaving captive Africans on six sugar plantations in Grenada. The Trevelyan family received compensation from the British government in 1835 for the abolition of slavery a year earlier.

== Publications ==
In addition to works mentioned, Trevelyan wrote the following:

- The Application of the Roman Alphabet to all the Oriental Languages, 1834; 3rd ed. 1858.
- A Report upon the Inland Customs and Town Duties of the Bengal Presidency, 1834.
- The Irish Crisis, 1848; 2nd ed. 1880.
- The Army Purchase Question and Report and Evidence of the Royal Commission considered, 1858.
- The Purchase System in the British Army, 1867; 2nd ed. 1867.
- The British Army in 1868, 1868; 4th ed. 1868.
- A Standing or a Popular Army, 1869.
- Three Letters on the Devonshire Labourer, 1869.
- From Pesth to Brindisi, being Notes of a Tour, 1871; 2nd ed. 1876.
- The Compromise offered by Canada in reference to the reprinting of English Books, 1872.
- Christianity and Hinduism contrasted, 1882.

Trevelyan's letters to the Times, with the signature of Indophilus, were collected with Additional Notes in 1857; 3rd edit. 1858. Several of his addresses, letters, and speeches were also published.

In conjunction with his cousin, Sir Walter Calverley Trevelyan, he edited the Trevelyan Papers (Camden Society 1856, 1862, 1872).

== Popular culture ==
- Anthony Trollope admitted that Trevelyan was the model for Sir Gregory Hardlines in his novel The Three Clerks (1858).
- Charles Dickens likely based the nepotistic aristocrat Tite Barnacle, a character in his novel Little Dorrit, on Trevelyan. Barnacle controls the "Circumlocution Office", where everything goes round in circles, and nothing ever gets done.
- The Irish-American rock band Black 47, in their song of the same name from their 1992 album Fire of Freedom, refer to Trevelyan, as well as Queen Victoria and Lord Russell, as being among those responsible for the famine.
- Trevelyan is referred to in the modern Irish folk song "The Fields of Athenry" by Pete St. John, about the Great Irish Famine: "Michael, they have taken you away / because you stole Trevelyan's corn / so the young might see the morn / now a prison ship lies waiting in the bay." Because of Trevelyan's policies, the Irish consider him one of the most detested figures in their history, along with Oliver Cromwell, who conquered the country in the 17th century.

== Notes ==
Attribution

- This article incorporates text from a publication now in the public domain: "Trevelyan, Charles Edward". Dictionary of National Biography. London: Smith, Elder & Co. 1885–1900.

Baronetage of the United Kingdom
New title	Baronet (of Wallington); 1874–1886	Succeeded by George Otto Trevelyan
