= West Grange Hall =

Coordinates: 55°10′30″N 1°56′16″W

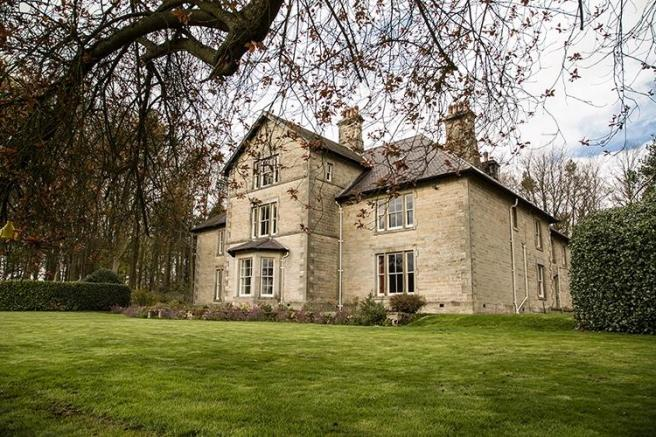
West Grange Hall, 2016

West Grange Hall is an English country house and estate in the village of Scots Gap, Northumberland, built between 1863 and 1896 and originally part of the Wallington Estate.

== History ==
West Grange Hall was built between 1863 and 1896 and was constructed for the Land Agent of the Trevelyan family of nearby Wallington Hall. The main house is a stone and quoin Victorian country house under a slate mansard roof. The property shares many internal architectural features with Wallington Hall including what appear to be early prototypes of detailed architrave, balanced doors and ornate fireplaces that can be clearly seen as similar to the grander house. The Wallington Estate was gifted to the Nation by Sir Charles Philips Trevelyan in 1942. The exact transfer of ownership of West Grange Hall is unclear, but recent sales particulars show that the Hall was used by the Royal Air Force during World War II. In the 1950s the estate was purchased by Major Michael Lycett CBE and Lady Wendy Lycett. The Hall and Estate were acquired in 2016 by local businessman Stephen Purvis, seeing the start of a major renovation and expansion of the estate.

== Grounds and Estate ==
West Grange Hall is surrounded by 35 acres of parkland, woodland and gardens. A livery stable forms part of the estate and the largest area of parkland is used by horses from the yard. West Grange Hall has a large courtyard which includes stables, workshops, a coach house, a 3-bedroom cottage and separate staff apartments.
