= Northcote–Trevelyan Report =

1854 British report on the Civil Service

The Northcote–Trevelyan Report was a document prepared by Stafford H. Northcote (later to be Chancellor of the Exchequer) and C.E. Trevelyan (then Permanent Secretary to the Treasury) about the British Civil Service. Commissioned in 1853 and published in February 1854, the report catalysed the development of His Majesty's Civil Service in the United Kingdom. Influenced by the Chinese Imperial Examinations, it recommended that entry to the Civil Service be solely on merit, to be enforced through the use of examinations. The report, which included suggestions solicited from Benjamin Jowett on the format of the proposed examinations, was formally titled Report on the Organisation of the Permanent Civil Service, Together with a Letter from the Rev. B. Jowett.

The report is generally regarded as the founding document of the British Civil Service. Peter Hennessy said it enshrined the service with the "core values of integrity, propriety, objectivity and appointment on merit, able to transfer its loyalty and expertise from one elected government to the next". Recognising that, at the time, public administration was suffering “both in internal efficiency and in public estimation", it formed the basis for the principle of an impartial Civil Service.

== Sources ==
Primary

- Report on the Organisation of the Permanent Civil Service, Together with a Letter from the Rev. B. Jowett . Parliamentary papers. Vol. HC 1854 xxvii (1713) 1. London: HMSO. 1854 – via Wikisource.
