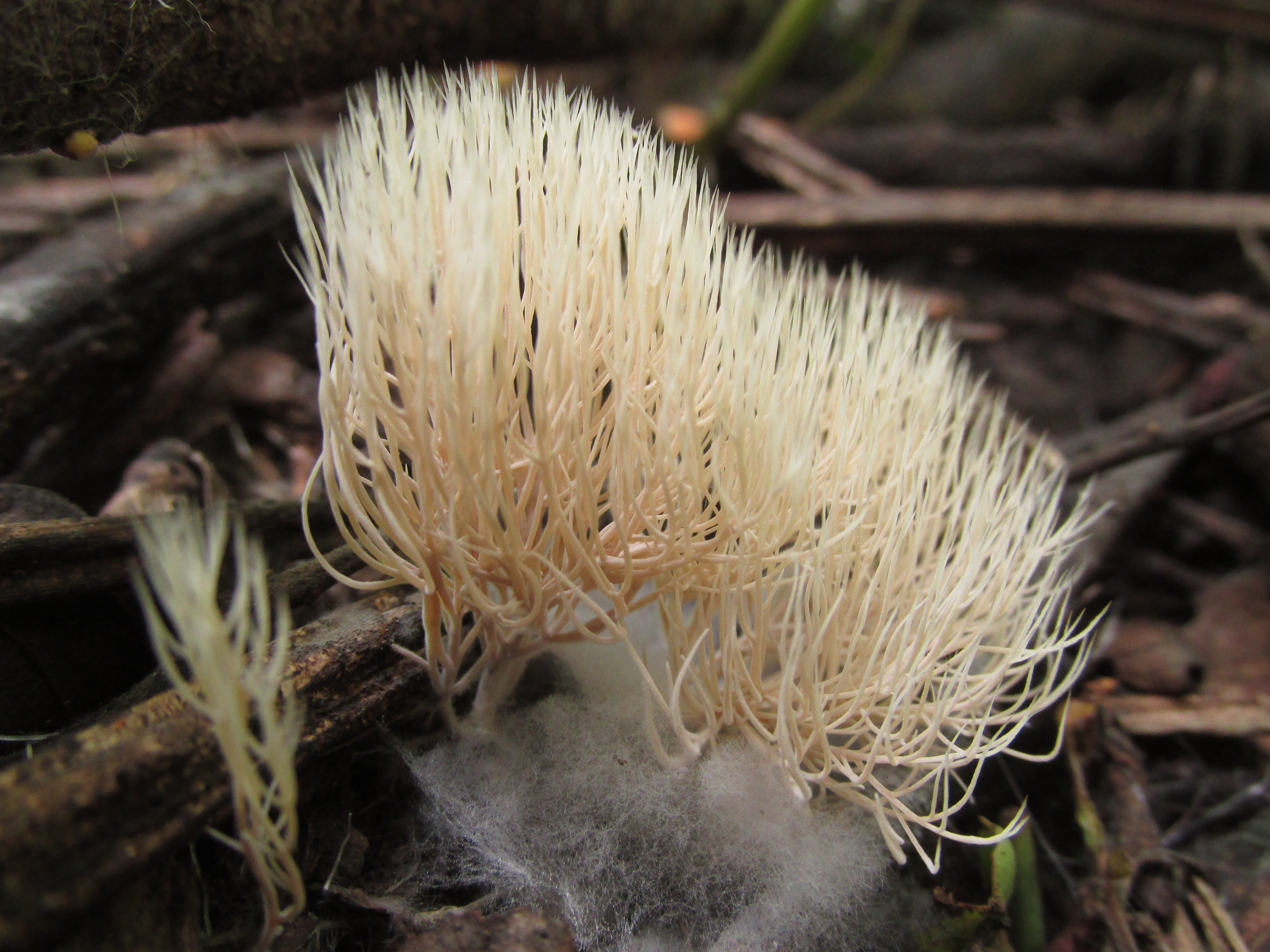

Scientific classification
- Kingdom: Fungi
- Division: Basidiomycota
- Class: Agaricomycetes
- Order: Agaricales
- Family: Pterulaceae
- Genus: Pterula
- Species: P. subulata

Binomial name
- Pterula subulata Fr. (1830)

Synonyms
- Anthina subulata Fr. (1829); Merisma subulatum Lév. (1846)

= Pterula subulata =

Species of fungus

Pterula subulata Mycological characteristics
- Smooth hymenium
- Hymenium attachment is not applicable
- Lacks a stipe
- Spore print is white
- Ecology is saprotrophic
- Edibility is unknown

Pterula subulata is a species of mushroom producing fungus in the family Pterulaceae. It has the common name angel hair coral.

== Taxonomy ==
It was first described in 1829 by the Swedish mycologist Elias Magnus Fries who classified it as Anthina (Pterula) subulata awaiting the publication of his 1830 text which would formally move it to Pterula subulata.

In 1846 the French mycologist Joseph-Henri Léveillé classified it as Merisma subulatum however this change was not adopted and the current name remains Pterula subulata.

== Description ==
Pterula subulata is a small whitish coral fungus with a delicate branching structure.

Fruit body: 3-6mm thin, hairlike coral that branches repeatedly towards the smooth and shiny pointed tips. The colour is white to off white to light brown with the tips having a lighter colour than the base. Stem: 1-2mm when present but sometimes absent. Flesh: White. Tough and rubbery. Spore print: White. Spores: Ellipsoid and smooth. 5–6 x 2.5–3.5μm. Taste: Indistinct. Smell: Indistinct.

== Habitat and distribution ==
This species is not commonly recorded in the United Kingdom but has been found in Bedfordshire, Cambridgeshire and South Somerset and was observed growing on soil in damp woodland.

It is found on soil in damp woodland where it grows solitary or in small trooping groups probably all through the year.

As of October 2022, GBIF has fewer than 200 recorded observations for this species with most being from Europe. However many of these observations are from iNaturalist and other citizen science platforms so may not be verified and could have been mistaken for another Pterula species.

== Etymology ==
The specific epithet subulata derives from the Latin subulatus meaning awl or needle shaped.

== Similar species ==
- Pterula multifida is described very similarly.
