= Laura Trevelyan =

British-American journalist (born 1968)

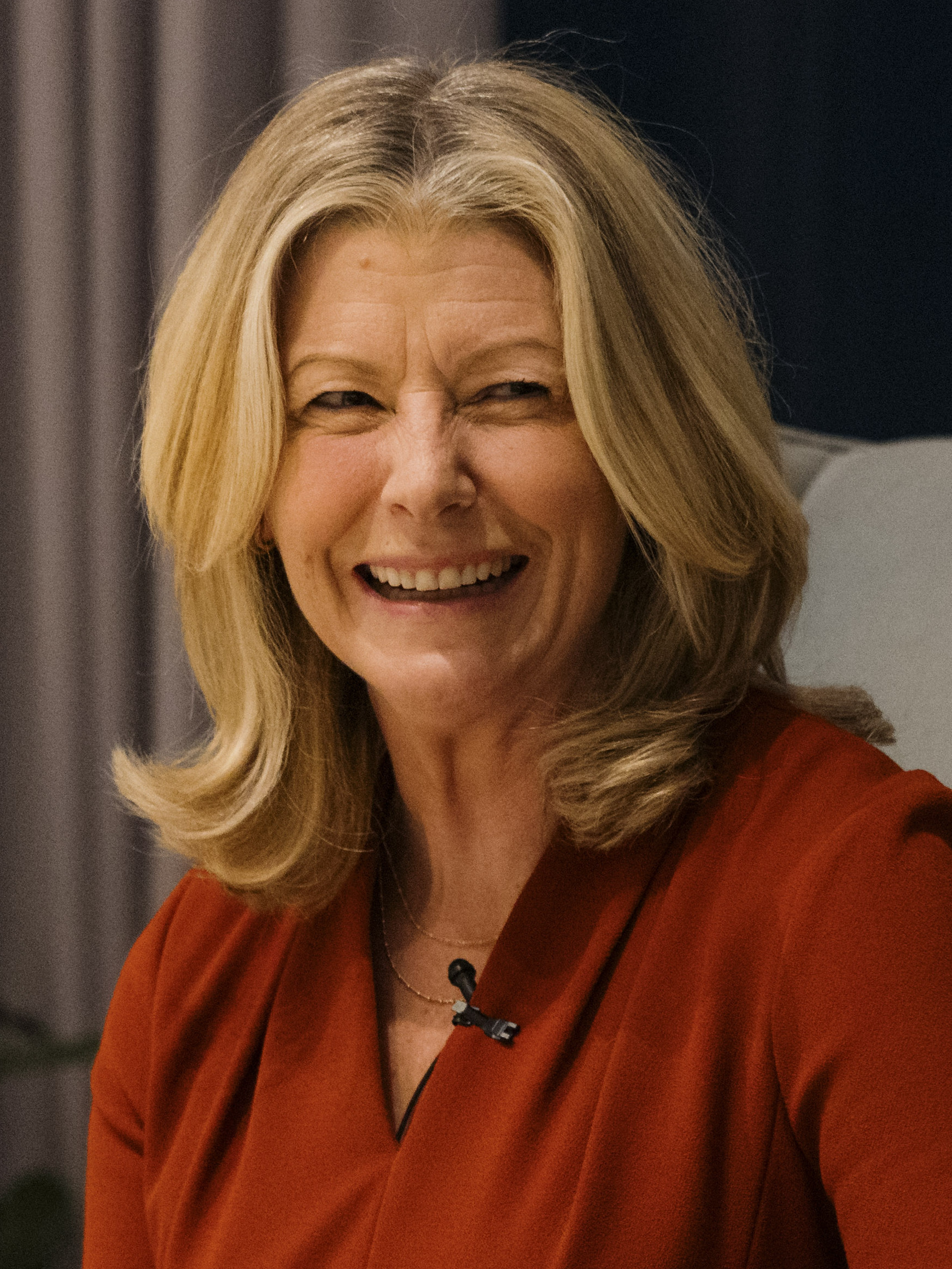
- Trevelyan in 2026

Chancellor of Cardiff University
- Incumbent
- Assumed office 19 February 2025
- Preceded by: Jenny Randerson

Personal details
- Born: Laura Kate Trevelyan; 21 August 1968 (age 58) Islington, London, United Kingdom
- Spouse: James Goldston (m. 1998)
- Children: 3
- Education: Bristol University (BA Politics 1990); University of Wales College, Cardiff (PGDip Journalism 1991)
- Occupation: Newsreader, anchor and correspondent

Laura Kate Trevelyan (born 21 August 1968) is a British-American journalist who worked for the BBC for 30 years. She served as an On the Record reporter, United Nations correspondent (2006–2009), and New York correspondent (2009–2012), before anchoring BBC World News America (2012–2023).

== Early life and education ==
Trevelyan was born on 21 August 1968. She was educated at Parliament Hill School in North London and was a member of her local Air Cadet unit (which she later described as being a "wonderful experience" and a positive influence on her later life). Trevelyan graduated with a first-class degree in Politics from Bristol University. She gained a postgraduate diploma in Journalism from the Cardiff School of Journalism in 1991.

== Career ==
Trevelyan began her career as a general reporter for London Newspaper Group in 1991, on titles including the Hammersmith Chronicle. She then joined Channel 4 as a researcher on A Week in Politics in 1992.

Trevelyan moved to the BBC in 1993, initially taking roles as a researcher for Breakfast News and as an assistant producer for Newsnight, before becoming a reporter for On the Record in 1994, where she covered the IRA ceasefire and Northern Ireland peace process. In 1998, Trevelyan shifted her focus to political reporting, covering Westminster, the 2001 general election and the run-up to the invasion of Iraq. She was a political correspondent for BBC News from 1999 and was based in London until her move to the US in 2004 to cover the presidential election, which coincided with her husband James Goldston's move to the US, to become a Senior Producer at ABC News in New York, after he left his role at ITV as an executive producer.

From 2006 to 2009, Trevelyan covered the United Nations, travelling to Darfur, Congo, Burma, and Sri Lanka, and was the first journalist to interview Secretary-General Ban Ki-moon. From 2009 to 2012, she was a BBC correspondent based in New York. After three years as the BBC's New York correspondent, Trevelyan joined BBC World News America as an anchor/correspondent.

In 2022, after uncovering her family's links to slavery in the Caribbean, Trevelyan made a documentary for the BBC World Service called Grenada: Confronting the past in 2022.

In March 2023, Trevelyan announced she would be stepping down from her position at the BBC after "thirty incredible years" to advocate for the Caribbean's reparatory justice agenda. Acting BBC executive Paul Royall thanked her for her "outstanding" contributions to the BBC. In 2025, Trevelyan was appointed Chancellor of Cardiff University, a ceremonial and ambassadorial role.

== Reparations advocacy ==
Trevelyan's ancestors owned more than 1,000 slaves spread across six sugar plantations on Grenada, despite never setting foot on the Caribbean island. After the 1833 abolition of slavery in the British Empire, slave owners were compensated by the government for the loss of their property; the Trevelyans received £34,000 (equivalent to £3,820,831 in 2025). In the wake of a cancelled visit to Grenada by the Earl and Countess of Wessex in April 2022, Trevelyan described this as "rank unfairness fuelling calls for more than expressions of profound sorrow from the UK government and the royal family that slavery ever happened".

After contemplating how best to make amends, in February 2023 the Trevelyans went in person to make an official apology to the people of Grenada, meeting with Prime Minister Dickon Mitchell. They also donated £100,000 in voluntary reparations, which went towards education projects, via CARICOM.

In April 2023, Laura Trevelyan co-founded Heirs of Slavery, a group of descendants of people who had profited from British transatlantic slavery and wanted to make amends. Other members include David Lascelles, 8th Earl of Harewood; Charles Gladstone, who is descended from prime minister William Gladstone; and journalist Alex Renton. The group has called on the British Prime Minister and King Charles to make a formal apology on behalf of the United Kingdom.

== Other roles ==
As of 2021, Trevelyan was a member of the Council on Foreign Relations.

== Books ==
Outside journalism, she has written the book A Very British Family: The Trevelyans and Their World, published in 2006, on the history of the Trevelyan family including her ancestor Sir Charles Trevelyan, 1st Baronet.

Her second book, The Winchester: The Gun That Built An American Dynasty, explores the family behind America's most famous firearm and was released in September 2016.

== Personal life ==
Trevelyan is married to James Goldston, former president of ABC News. They have three sons and live in Brooklyn Heights, New York. Live, on the BBC's coverage of the 2016 US Presidential Election, Trevelyan said she was about to become a US citizen; she was sworn in on 9 November, the day after Donald Trump won the presidential race.

In May 2023, Trevelyan stated that if the Irish government asked her family to pay compensation over the Irish famine they would consider the request, after accepting that her great, great, great-grandfather Sir Charles Trevelyan was among those who "failed their people" while governing Ireland during the famine.
