= Hawkedon =

Village in Suffolk, England

Coordinates: 52.145°N 0.627°E

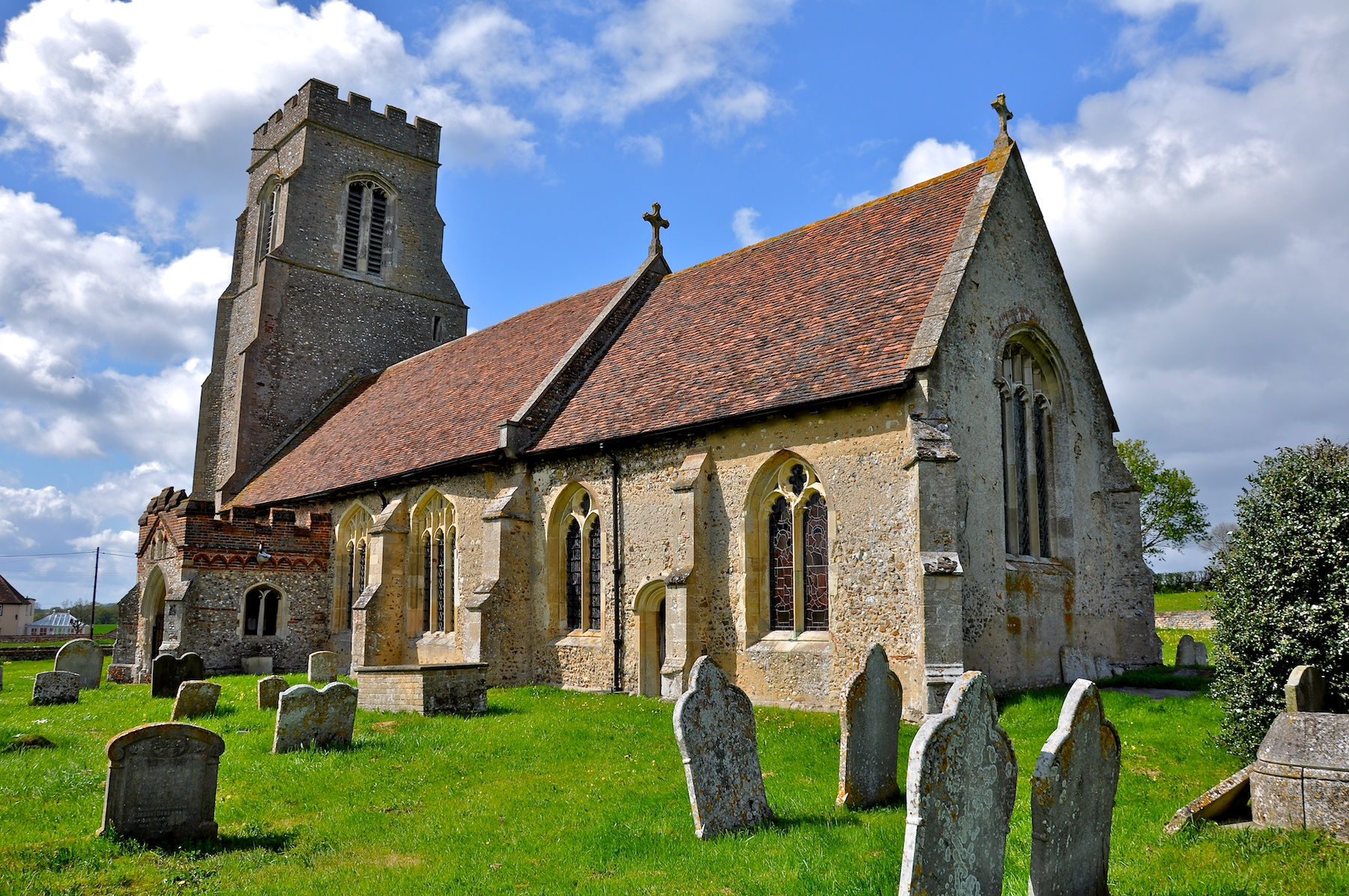
- St Mary's Church, Hawkedon

- Location within Suffolk
- Population: 120 (2005); 134 (2011)
- District: West Suffolk
- Shire county: Suffolk
- Region: East
- Country: England
- Sovereign state: United Kingdom
- Post town: Bury St Edmunds
- Postcode district: IP29
- Police: Suffolk
- Fire: Suffolk
- Ambulance: East of England

Hawkedon is a village and civil parish in the West Suffolk district of Suffolk in eastern England. Located around 7 miles (11 km) south-south-west of Bury St Edmunds, the parish also contains the hamlet of Thurston End, and in 2005 had a population of 120. The majority of the village is classed as a conservation area.

== Etymology ==
The name means 'hill of the hawks', derived from the Old English hafoc meaning hawk (in the genitive plural), and the Old English dūn meaning hill.

== History ==
The village is recorded in the Domesday Book of 1086 with a population of 24 households in 1086; 10 freemen, 7 smallholders, 5 slaves, & 2 villagers.

In 1870–72, John Marius Wilson's Imperial Gazetteer of England and Wales described the village as:

HAWKEDON, a parish in Sudbury district, Suffolk; 5½ miles NNE of Clare r. station, and 10 NW by N of Sudbury. Post town, Stansfield, under Sudbury. Acres, 1,461. Real property, £2,049. Population, 321. Houses, 67. Hawkedon Hall belongs to J. E. Hale, Esq.; and Thurston Hall, to H. J. Oakes, Esq. The living is a rectory in the diocese of Ely. Value, £400. Patron, H. J. Oakes, Esq. The church is ancient, with a tower; and contains an ancient font, and several brasses and monuments. There is a national school.

In 1887, John Bartholomew also wrote an entry on Hawkedon in the Gazetteer of the British Isles with a much shorter description:

Hawkedon, parish, W. Suffolk, 5½ miles NE. of Clare, 1461 acres, population 278; P.O.

== Buildings ==
There are many other medieval and listed properties in the parish, notably the Grade I Swan Hall and Thurston End Hall (both fine timber-framed 16th-century houses). The village also has a 1935 listed K6 telephone box to the west of the pub. There is a total of 19 listed buildings in the parish.

Although there are now no shops, there is a 15th-century pub called The Queen's Head (formerly known as the Queen Inn).

=== Church ===
The 15th-century church, St Mary's is very unusual in that it is placed on the green. It is reputed to be the only church in Suffolk located in this way. It is a Grade I listed building, and includes a painted panel depicting St Dorothy and a square font with carved panels thought to date from the 12th-century.

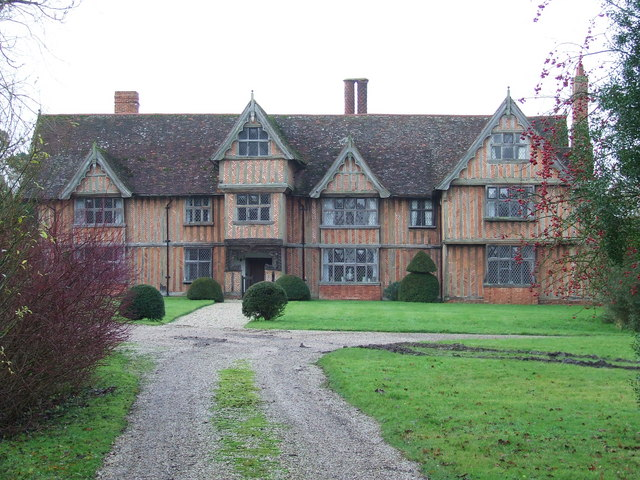
Grade I-listed Thurston End Hall, Hawkedon (from geograph.org.uk)

== Notable residents ==
Lady Pauline Trevelyan (1816-1866); painter & socialite.

== External sources ==
- Hawkedon Vision of Britain
