= Wallington Hall =

Grade I listed historic house museum in Northumberland, England

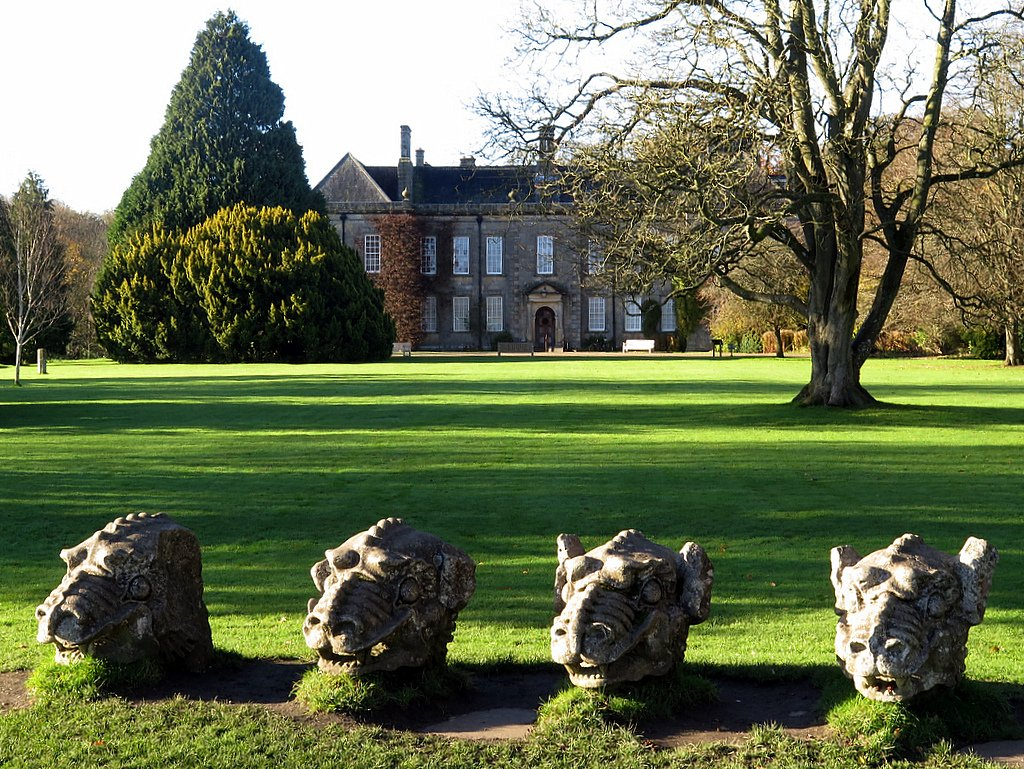

- Location within Northumberland
- 55°09′07″N 1°57′25″W
- Type: Country house
- Location: Cambo
- OS grid reference: NZ 02880 84191

History
- Built: 1688
- Rebuilt: 1735–1745

Site notes
- Area: Northumberland
- Architect: Daniel Garret
- Architectural style: Palladian
- Owner: National Trust

Listed Building – Grade I
- Official name: Wallington Hall
- Designated: 6 May 1952
- Reference no.: 1042869

Wallington is a country house and gardens located about 12 miles (19 km) west of Morpeth, Northumberland, England, about 1.2 miles (1.9 km) south-southeast the village of Cambo. It has been owned by the National Trust since 1942, after it was donated complete with the estate and farms by Sir Charles Philips Trevelyan, 3rd Baronet, the first donation of its kind. It is a Grade I listed building.

== History ==
The estate was owned by the Fenwick family from 1475 until Sir John Fenwick, 3rd Baronet had financial problems and opted to sell his properties to the Blacketts in 1688. He sold the rump of the family estates and Wallington Hall to Sir William Blackett for £4000 and an annuity of £2000 a year. The annuity was to be paid for his lifetime and that of his wife, Mary Fenwick. Blackett was happy with the deal as he discovered lead on the land and became wealthy.

The hall house was rebuilt, demolishing the ancient pele tower, although the cellars of the early medieval house remain. The house was substantially rebuilt again, in Palladian style, for Sir Walter Calverley-Blackett, 2nd Baronet by architect Daniel Garret, before passing to the Trevelyan family in 1777.

In 1870 a hoard comprising 26 different objects was found on the Wallington Hall estate

After Pauline Jermyn married the naturalist Sir Walter Calverley Trevelyan, they began hosting literary and scientific figures at the Hall. As a cultural centre, Wallington visitors included members of the Pre-Raphaelite Brotherhood.

Sir Charles Trevelyan, 3rd Baronet inherited the property from his father, Sir George Trevelyan, 2nd Baronet, in 1928. He was a leading member of Liberal and Labour governments in the late 1920s. Charles was married to "Molly", Lady Mary Trevelyan.

== Description ==
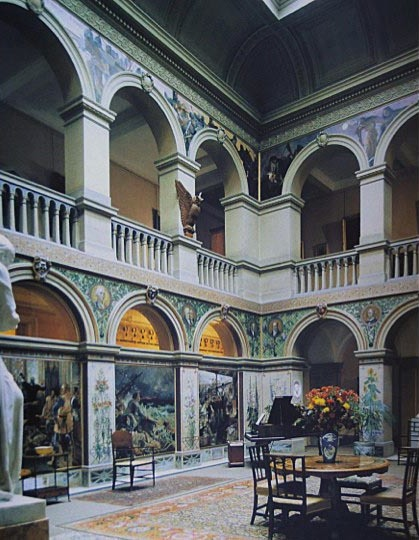
The central hall showing some of Scott's murals

The house is set in 100 acres (40 ha) of rolling parkland, which includes a wooded dene (valley), ornamental lakes, lawns, and a recently refurbished walled garden.

The ceilings in the dining and drawing rooms are decorated in the rococo style by the Italian artist, Pietro Lafranchini. Attractions inside the house include the desk where Thomas Babington Macaulay, brother-in-law of Sir Charles Trevelyan, wrote his History of England, a large collection of antique dollshouses, and eight murals in the central hall depicting the history of Northumberland, painted by William Bell Scott.

The National Trust also own the estate of which the house is a part; the produce from these farms, as well as others in the region, was sold in a farm shop on site. The farm shop closed in 2012.

== Wildlife ==
In July 2023, a family of beavers was released in a 24 ha (59 acres) enclosure on a tributary of the Hart Burn in the centre of the estate. This is the third release of beavers at a National Trust property.

In November 2023, the Vincent Wildlife Trust announced Wallington estate as one of their three Haven Sites for the Martens on the Move project. This project aims to encourage the natural recovery of pine marten populations through community action across England, Scotland and Wales. The project is facilitated by a £1.2 million grant from the National Lottery Heritage Fund.

These initiatives are part of a long term project, called Wilder Wallington, to reintroduce native species of plants and animals to the estate and to encourage the restoring of peat and wetlands and other nature recovery schemes. One aim is to plant one million trees by 2030; some 115,000 have already been planted. Other animals being considered for reintroduction are water voles.

== See also ==
- West Grange Hall

== Sources ==
- Grundy, John (2022). History of Northumberland. Newcastle upon Tyne: Tyne Bridge Publishing. ISBN 9781838280970.
