= Humphrey Trevelyan, Baron Trevelyan =

British colonial administrator, diplomat and writer

The Right Honourable Lord Trevelyan KG GCMG CIE OBE
- 1967 photograph, by Godfrey Argent

British Ambassador to the Soviet Union
- In office 1962–1965
- Preceded by: Sir Frank Roberts
- Succeeded by: Sir Geoffrey Harrison

High Commissioner for Aden and the Protectorate of South Arabia
- In office 1967–1967
- Preceded by: Sir Richard Gordon Turnbull
- Succeeded by: Office abolished

Personal details
- Born: 27 November 1905 Hindhead, Surrey, England
- Died: 9 February 1985 (aged 79)

Humphrey Trevelyan, Baron Trevelyan, KG, GCMG, CIE, OBE (27 November 1905 – 9 February 1985) was a British colonial administrator, diplomat and writer. Having begun his career in the Indian Civil Service and Indian Political Service, he transferred to HM Diplomatic Service upon Indian independence in 1947, and had a distinguished career during which he held several important ambassadorships.

== Biography ==
Trevelyan was born at the parsonage, Hindhead, Surrey, the younger son of the Reverend George Trevelyan, great-grandson of George Trevelyan, Archdeacon of Taunton, third son of Sir John Trevelyan, 4th Baronet. His elder brother John Trevelyan was the Secretary of the Board of the British Board of Film Censors. The historian George Macaulay Trevelyan was a second cousin.

He was educated at Lancing and Jesus College, Cambridge, where he read Classics. After Cambridge, Trevelyan joined the Indian Civil Service in 1929, transferring to the Indian Political Service in 1932.

He served in India until independence in 1947, then transferred to HM Diplomatic Service. He held many key diplomatic posts, including chargé d'affaires in Beijing after the Revolution, ambassador to Egypt at the time of the Suez Crisis, a development with which he was clearly uncomfortable, ambassador to Iraq at the time of the 1961 Kuwait crisis, Iraq's first attempt to annex Kuwait, and ambassador to the Soviet Union. On his retirement in 1965, he was offered the post of Permanent Under-Secretary of State for Foreign Affairs, which he declined in order that a younger man should be appointed.

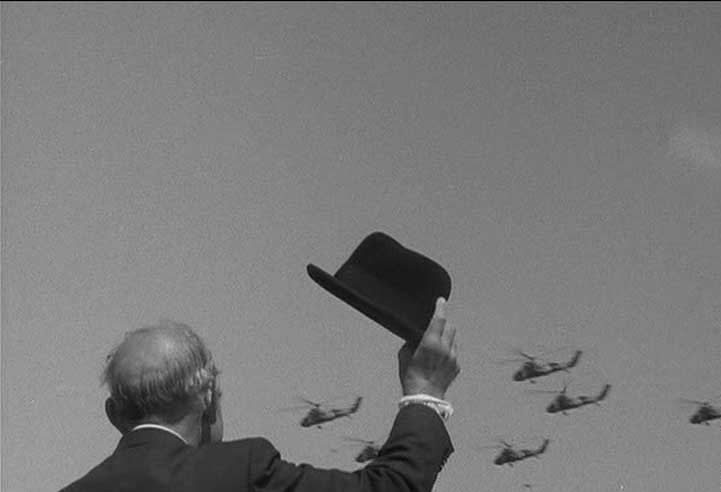
Humphrey Trevelyan, the then-High Commissioner of Aden, waving to departing British Helicopters in 30 November 1967

He completed forty years of public service as the last high commissioner of Aden, having been coaxed out of retirement by Foreign Secretary George Brown, where he wound up British protection and oversaw the British withdrawal from what had been the Aden Protectorate and became South Yemen.

While Ambassador to Iraq, he held the customary position of vice-president of the British School of Archaeology in Iraq. Unlike his predecessors, he took an active interest, visiting excavations and offering hospitality when needed. After leaving Iraq, he remained a member of the council. In 1982, he was elected president in succession to Seton Lloyd. However, ill health meant his resigned the following year, and was succeeded by Barbara Parker-Mallowan.

Trevelyan wrote a number of books about his career, including The Middle East in Revolution (1970) and The India We Left (1972). He also wrote a memoir Public and Private (1980).

On 12 February 1968, he was awarded a life peerage with the title Baron Trevelyan, of Saint Veep in the County of Cornwall. He was introduced to the House of Lords on 21 February 1968.

Trevelyan married Violet Margaret "Peggy" Bartholomew (1913-2009), only daughter of General Sir William Henry Bartholomew, in 1937; they had two daughters. The younger, Catherine, a publisher, married the broadcaster and historian Robert Kee, and was appointed OBE in 1977.

== Arms ==
Coat of arms of Humphrey Trevelyan, Baron Trevelyan, KG, GCMG, CIE, OBE
| Coronet An Baron's Coronet Crest Two arms embowed counter embowed vested Azure cuffed Argent holding in the hands proper a bezant. Escutcheon Gules issuant from a base barry wavy of six Argent and Azure a demi horse Argent crined and unguled Or. Supporters Two dolphins Azure finned and flippered Gules each crowned with a baron's coronet proper. Motto TYME TRYETH TROTH |

== See also ==
- Trevelyan baronets for earlier history of the family

Diplomatic posts
| Preceded by Leo Lamb | British Chargé d'affaires ad interim to the People's Republic of China; 1953–1955 | Succeeded by Con O'Neill |
| Preceded by Sir Ralph Stevenson | British Ambassador to Egypt; 1955–1956 | Suspended Suez Crisis Title next held by Colin Crowe as Chargé d'affaires |
| Preceded by Sir Michael Wright | British Ambassador to Iraq; 1958–1961 | Succeeded by Sir Roger Allen |
| Preceded by Sir Frank Roberts | British Ambassador to the Soviet Union; 1962–1965 | Succeeded by Sir Geoffrey Harrison |
| Preceded by Sir Richard Gordon Turnbull | High Commissioner of Aden; 1967 | Post abolished |
