= Robert Trevelyan (cricketer) =

English cricketer (born 1970)

Personal information
- Full name: Robert William Dixey Trevelyan
- Born: 28 November 1970 (age 55); Folkestone, Kent, England
- Batting: Right-handed
- Role: Wicket-keeper

Domestic team information
- Years: Team
- 1990: Oxford University

Career statistics
Competition	First-class
Matches	3
Runs scored	0
Batting average	0.00
100s/50s	–/–
Top score	0
Catches/stumpings	2/–
- Source: Cricinfo, 10 April 2020

Robert William Dixey Trevelyan (born 28 November 1970) is an English former first-class cricketer

The son of The Reverend Robert James Willam Irvine Trevelyan and Felicity Jane Gibson, he was born at Folkestone in November 1970. He later studied at Pembroke College, Oxford where he played first-class cricket for Oxford University in 1990. Trevelyan's three appearances came against county opponents in the form of Glamorgan and Nottinghamshire, in addition to playing against Cambridge University in The University Match. Playing as a wicket-keeper, he failed to score any runs in his three matches.
