= Cambo, Northumberland =

Village in Northumberland, England

Coordinates: 55.164°N 1.962°W

Cambo
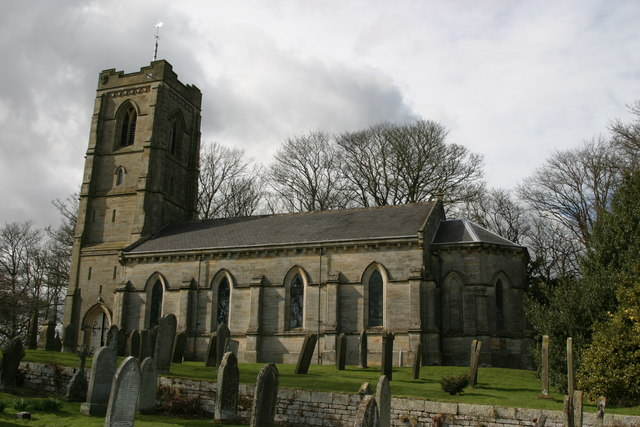
- Holy Trinity Church

- Location within Northumberland
- OS grid reference: NZ025855
- Civil parish: Wallington Demesne
- Unitary authority: Northumberland
- Ceremonial county: Northumberland
- Region: North East
- Country: England
- Sovereign state: United Kingdom
- Post town: MORPETH
- Postcode district: NE61
- Dialling code: 01670
- Police: Northumbria
- Fire: Northumberland
- Ambulance: North East
- UK Parliament: Hexham

Cambo is a village and former civil parish, now in the parish of Wallington Demesne, in Northumberland, England. It is about 11 miles (18 km) to the west of the county town of Morpeth at the junction of the B6342 and B6343 roads. The village was gifted along with the Wallington Estate to the National Trust by Sir Charles Philips Trevelyan in 1942, the first donation of its kind. It remains a National Trust village. In 1951 the parish had a population of 60.

There is a village school, Cambo First School, which had 46 pupils in September 2020 aged 4-9 years. There is a church, a village hall and a community orchard in the village.

== Governance ==
Cambo was formerly a township and chapelry in Hartburn parish, from 1866 Cambo was a civil parish in its own right until it was abolished on 1 April 1955 and merged with Wallington Demesne.

== Notable people ==
Capability Brown, the 18th-century landscape gardener, was educated at the village school. He was born at nearby Kirkharle.
