= International Students House, London =

Set of lodgings in London, England

Coordinates: 51.5236°N 0.1449°W

International Students House
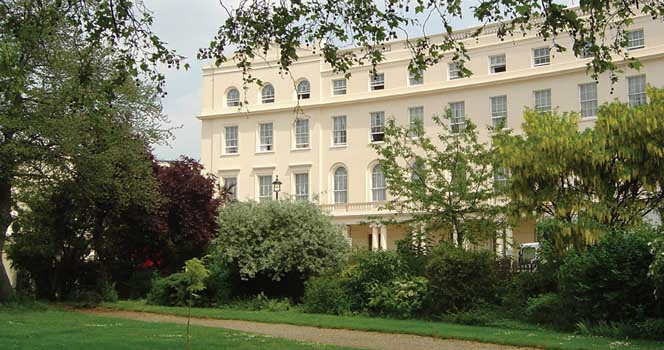
- Founded: 1917; 109 years ago
- Founder: Mary Trevelyan
- Type: Accommodation and related assistance to study
- Purpose: Education and international collaboration
- Location(s): 229 Great Portland Street (directly backing on to Park Crescent), London, United Kingdom and 4–10 York Terrace East, London
- Region served: Worldwide
- Website: ish.org.uk

International Students House, London (colloquially shortened to ISH) is a set of lodgings for international and British students in London. It permanently occupies one large building in streets that face Park Crescent which in turn across a square green faces the park itself.

It operates as a financially self-supporting registered charity under a board of trustees.

Approximately ten students apply for every place. Selection is distinct from that of London's colleges and universities where selection must also be gained. It is on the basis of a student's "demonstrated willingness to participate and become involved in the life of the House." Each year, the House admits Fulbright scholars and students attending places of advanced learning including King's College London, LSE, Imperial College London, UCL, SOAS, London Business School, The Royal Academy of Music, RADA, Goldsmiths, The Architectural Association School of Architecture and BPP Law School, among others.

Annually, the House, together with its partners, awards residential scholarships with a value of more than £800,000. ISH also has 70,000 non-resident members, making up a large proportion of the international students in London.

== History ==
=== Student Movement House ===
Student Movement House at 32 Russell Square (in the Bloomsbury district of London) was founded in 1917 as a social centre and hostel by the Student Christian Movement of Great Britain and Ireland. The House was founded with legacies from three of its members who had been killed in World War I, and it was dedicated on 26 November 1917 as a memorial to British students who died in the war. The House was founded with the original intention of creating accommodation for Belgian and Russian refugee students but became a centre used by students from all countries.

The House served as an important space for Bloomsbury's Black population during the interwar period and was well-known as a place where African and West Indian students would not experience discrimination. In 1932, C.L.R. James described Student Movement House as "a club for London students, white and coloured, but with its chief aim giving coloured students in London the opportunity to meet together".

Mary Trevelyan was appointed as Warden in 1933 and in 1938, the House relocated to Gower Street. The Gower Street building was left intact but leaning due to bombing in the London Blitz.

=== Park Crescent ===
The first building at 1–6 Park Crescent (known as GPS because of its entrance at 229 Great Portland Street) was acquired and rebuilt. It was opened in May 1965 by the Trust's Patron, Her Majesty Queen Elizabeth The Queen Mother. In 1968, a series of buildings designed by John Nash on York Terrace East also in the South Regent's Park neighbourhood (seven minutes walk from GPS) were acquired and rebuilt. They were subsequently named Mary Trevelyan Hall and opened in 1971. The House also built an underground garage in York Terrace East as part of the development.

These four buildings combine to make up International Students House, providing more than 700 beds (including 56 flats for students with families), three bars, a restaurant, internet access points, a fitness centre and public meeting rooms.

In 1985, the original Trust was separated into two sister charities, operating in parallel, with the International Students Trust managing the investment portfolios and International Students House owning and operating the residences and the activities.

As of 2010, ISH students represent more than 110 nations, and ISH has more than 70,000 non-resident student members.

ISH accepts UK students as well as international students to live or participate. The four main areas of operation are housing, provision of social facilities and activities, welfare and advice support and the provision of residential scholarships, which together with the House's partners represents a £800,000 plus annual programme which that received a Commendation in The Charity Awards 2002.

The House operates as a financially self-supporting charity with a diverse number of self-generated income streams. The House employs a total of around 130 staff who between them can speak at least 20 languages. ISH has been a recognised "Investor in People" since 1997, achieved "Customer First" recognition in 2009 and most recently obtained the Investor in People Gold Award in December 2011.

== Stated mission ==
- To help students to achieve the academic, personal and leadership aims that have brought them to the United Kingdom;
- To provide the best possible opportunities for overseas students to experience the many facets of life in the UK and to give them a deeper understanding of British society;
- To give British students an opportunity to broaden their horizons through friendship with people from widely differing backgrounds and cultures; and
- By these means to make an effective contribution to better international relations.

== See also ==
- Cité internationale universitaire, Paris
- Goodenough College, London
- International Student House of Washington, D.C.
- International House of New York
- International House Berkeley
- John F. Kennedy Memorial, London
