= Walter Calverley Trevelyan =

British naturalist and geologist (1797–1879)

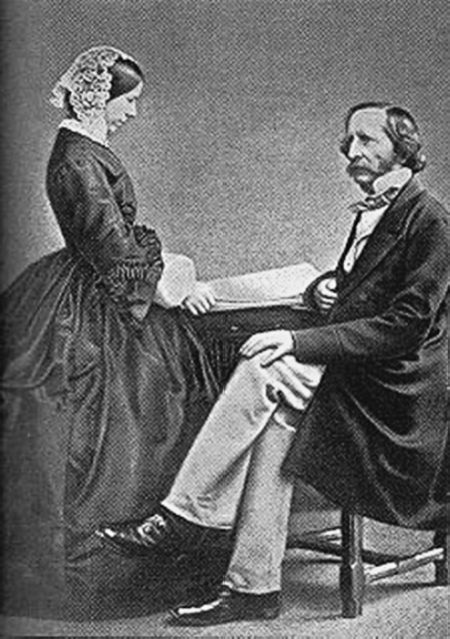
Pauline & Walter Trevelyan

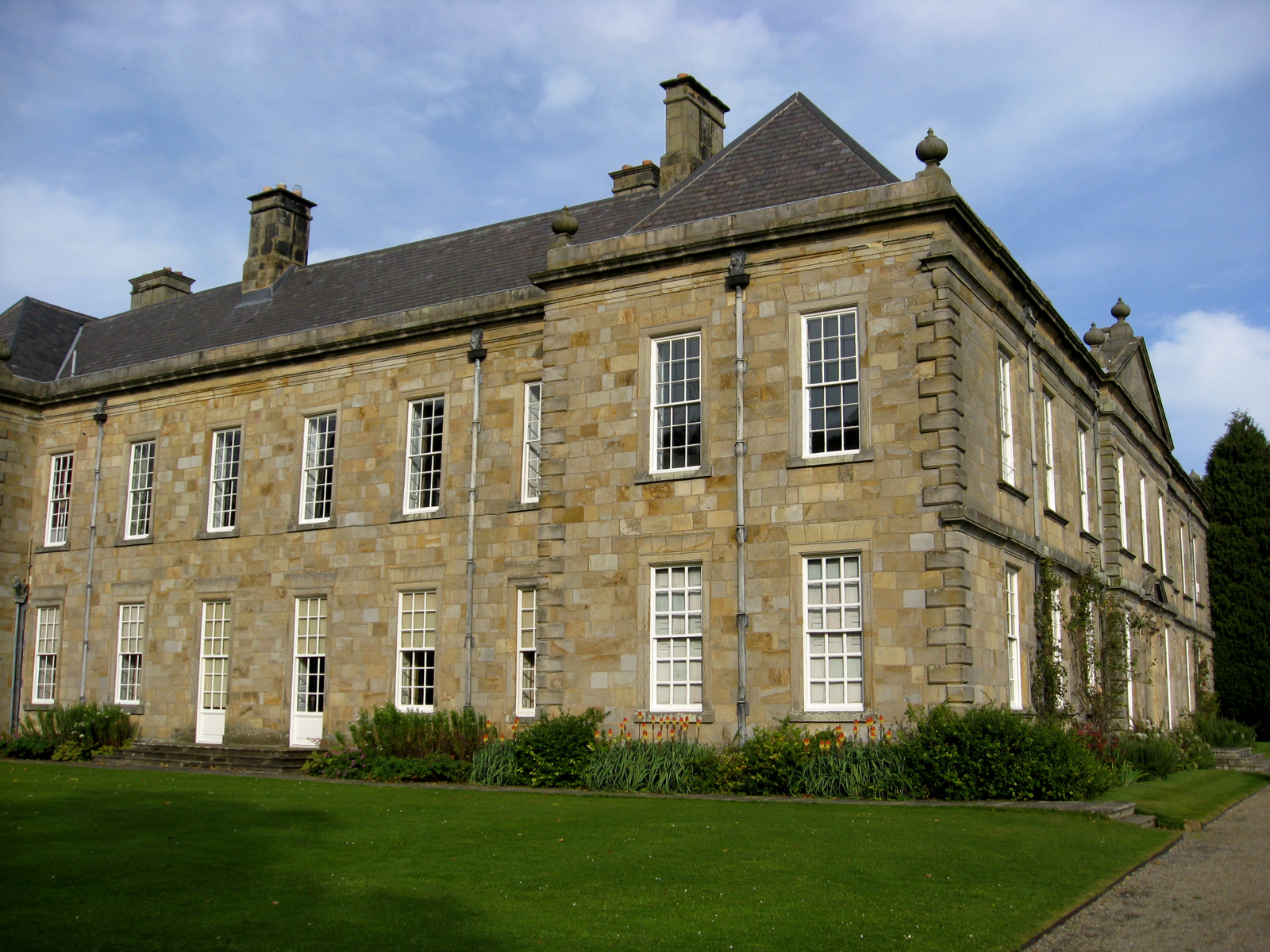
Wallington Hall

Sir Walter Calverley Trevelyan, 6th Baronet FGS FRSE (31 March 1797 – 23 March 1879) was an English naturalist and geologist.

== Life ==
He was born in 1797 in Newcastle-upon-Tyne, the eldest son of Sir John Trevelyan, fifth baronet, of Nettlecombe, Somerset, by his wife Maria Wilson, daughter of Sir Thomas Spencer Wilson of Charlton, Kent. The family was, and is, Cornish, deriving its name from Tre-Velian or Trevelyan, near Fowey.

He was educated at Harrow School. He matriculated at University College, Oxford, on 26 April 1816, graduating B.A. in 1820 and M.A. in 1822. In the former year he proceeded to Edinburgh to continue the scientific studies which he had begun at Oxford.

In 1821 he visited the Faroe Islands, and published in the Edinburgh New Philosophical Journal (1835, vol. xviii.) an account of his observations, which he reprinted in 1837 for private circulation. Between 1835 and 1846 he travelled much in the south of Europe, but in the latter year succeeded to the title and family estates in Somerset, Devon, Cornwall, and Northumberland. These were greatly improved during his tenure, for he was a generous landlord and a public-spirited agriculturist, much noted for his herd of short-horned cattle.

He was elected a fellow of the Geological Society (FGS) in 1817, and was also elected a fellow of the Royal Society of Edinburgh (FRSE) in 1822, and of the Society of Antiquaries in 1854. For some years he was president of the United Kingdom Alliance. Botany and geology were his favourite sciences, but he had also an excellent knowledge of antiquities, and was a liberal supporter of all efforts for the augmentation of knowledge, among others of the erection of the museum buildings at Oxford. He was a liberal patron of the fine arts, and formed at Wallington Hall a good collection of curious books and of specimens illustrative of natural history and ethnology. In conjunction with his cousin, Sir Charles Edward Trevelyan, he edited the Trevelyan Papers (Camden Soc. 1856, 1862, 1872), to the third part of which a valuable introductory notice is prefixed. He published, according to the Royal Society's catalogue, fifteen papers on scientific subjects, the majority dealing with geological topics in the north of England.

His botanical specimens are stored at the herbaria of Great North Museum: Hancock, Royal Botanic Garden Edinburgh, Kew Gardens, and Glasgow's Kelvingrove Art Gallery and Museum.

He died at Wallington Hall on 23 March 1879.

== Family ==
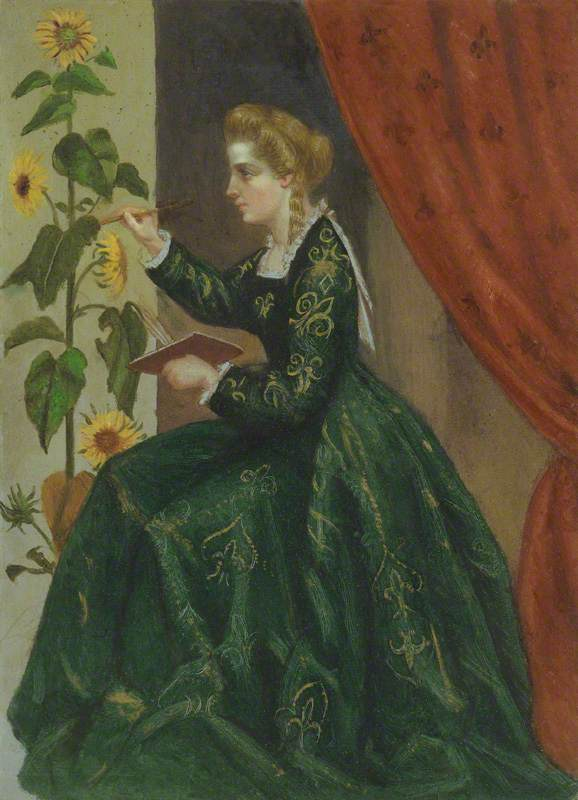
Portrait painted by Pauline Trevelyan and Laura Capel Lofft in c.1862.

He was twice married: firstly, on 21 May 1835, to Pauline Jermyn (d.1866), daughter of George Bitton Jermyn; secondly, on 11 July 1867, to Laura Capel, daughter of Capel Lofft, of Troston Hall in Suffolk. Laura was described by her half-sister: 'She was brought up in Italy, and is quite an artist, and a most beautiful copyist.' As both marriages were childless, the title descended to his nephew, Sir Alfred Wilson Trevelyan (1831–1891), seventh baronet, but he left the north-country property to his cousin, Sir Charles Edward Trevelyan.

His will came as a surprise to Alfred, being advised at the end of a lengthy letter on the evils of alcohol. Alfred then issued a costly but unsuccessful challenge for the title and estate. A biographer from the family notes that Walter changed his will in 1852, being impressed by his cousin's son; the young George Otto had been one of the couple's visitors and received hints of the secret will. Coming from the modest family of a civil servant, Charles was suddenly elevated to a position of wealth and position.

A medallion head is introduced into the decorations of the hall at Wallington; a portrait in oils, painted by an Italian artist about 1845, is at Nettlecombe, and a small watercolour (by Millais) is in the possession of the widow of Sir A. W. Trevelyan.

Baronetage of England
Preceded by John Trevelyan	Baronet (of Nettlecombe); 1846–1879	Succeeded by Alfred Trevelyan
