= George Trevelyan (priest) =

George Trevelyan (17 December 1765 – 13 October 1827) was an Anglican priest in the late 18th and early 19th centuries.

Trevelyan was the son of Sir John Trevelyan Bt MP. He was educated at St Alban Hall, Oxford, matriculating in 1789, graduating BCL in 1797, and was ordained in 1797. He held livings at Nettlecombe, Somerset, Treborough and Huish Champflower. He was Archdeacon of Bath from 1815 to 1817; and Archdeacon of Taunton from then until his death.
