= Trevelyan baronets =

Baronetcy in the Baronetage of the United Kingdom

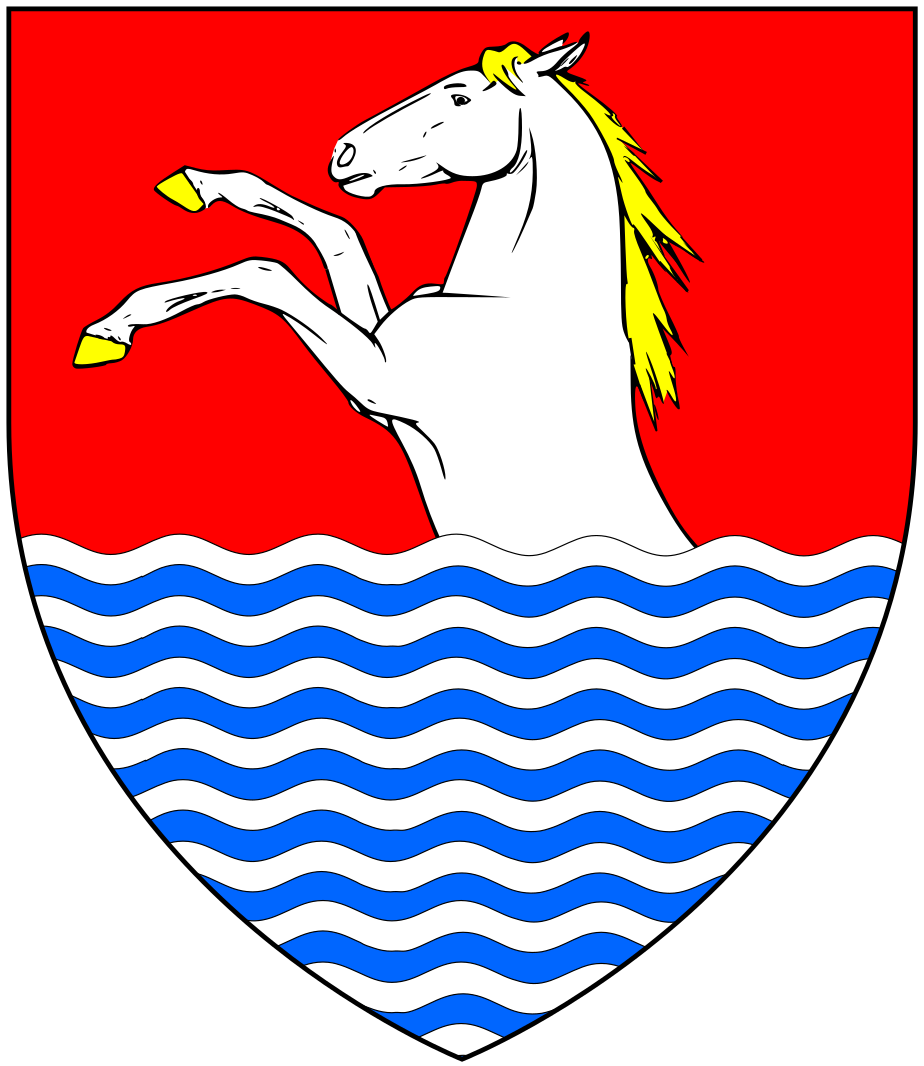
Arms of Trevelyan: Gules, a demi-horse argent hoofed and maned or issuing out of water in base proper

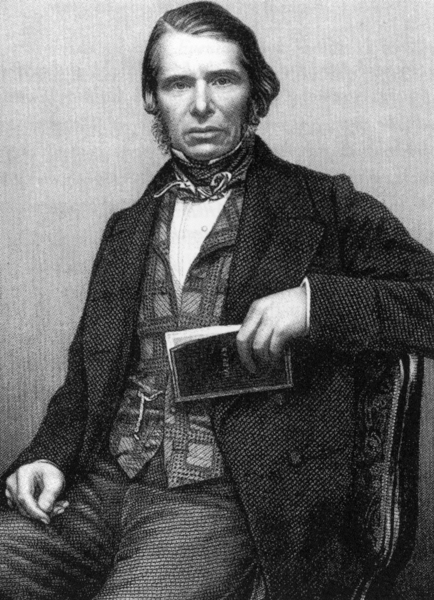
Sir Charles Trevelyan, 1st Baronet, of Wallington

There have been two baronetcies created for members of the Trevelyan family (pronounced "Trevillian"), one in the Baronetage of England and one in the Baronetage of the United Kingdom. As of 2014, both creations are extant.

== Origins ==
The family derived its surname from the manor of Trevelyan in the parish of St Veep, Cornwall, situated in the ancient hundred of West Wivel, called Trewellen in the Domesday Book of 1086, and shown in the British Ordnance Survey map of 1890 as located about one mile east of Penpoll. A different manor named Trevelien in 1086 (now named Trevillyn) is in the adjacent hundred of Powder.

The Trevilian, later Trevelyan Baronetcy, of Nettlecombe in the County of Somerset, was created in the Baronetage of England on 24 January 1662 for George Trevilian.

- The 1st Baronet was the son of George Trevilian, a member of the Somerset gentry and a supporter of the Royalist cause in the Civil War.
- The 2nd Baronet sat as a Member of Parliament for Somerset and for Minehead. He changed the spelling of the family surname to Trevelyan.
- The 4th Baronet was a Member of Parliament for Newcastle-upon-Tyne and for Somerset.
- The 8th Baronet served as High Sheriff of Cornwall for 1906-7.
- As of 28 February 2014 the present Baronet has not successfully proven his succession and is therefore not on the Official Roll of the Baronetage, with the baronetcy considered dormant since 1976.

Prominent members of the senior branch included: George Trevelyan (third son of the 4th Baronet), Archdeacon of Taunton in Somerset. His third son Henry Willoughby Trevelyan was a Major-General in the British Army. His younger son Sir Ernest John Trevelyan (1850–1929) was a Judge of the High Court of Calcutta, a writer on legal matters and a member of the Oxford Town Council. Humphrey Trevelyan, Baron Trevelyan, son of the Reverend George Philip Trevelyan, son of the Reverend William Pitt Trevelyan, sixth son of the aforementioned the Venerable George Trevelyan, was a diplomat and author. See below.

The Trevelyan Baronetcy, of Wallington in the County of Northumberland, was created in the Baronetage of the United Kingdom on 13 March 1874 for the civil servant and colonial administrator Sir Charles Trevelyan, 1st Baronet. The estate of Wallington was inherited by Sir George Trevelyan, 3rd Baronet (1707–1768) from his wife Julia Calverley, daughter of Sir Walter Calverley, 1st Baronet, and his wife Julia Blackett, heiress of Wallington Castle, rebuilt by the Blacketts in the 1689s, who purchased it from the Fenwick family. The family seat is Wallington Hall, near Cambo in Northumberland.

- The 1st Baronet was the son of the aforementioned Venerable George Trevelyan, third son of the fourth Baronet of the 1662 creation (see above).
- The 2nd Baronet, George Otto Trevelyan, was a historian and Liberal politician.
  - R. C. Trevelyan, second son of the 2nd Baronet, was a poet and dramatist. His son Julian Trevelyan was a painter.
  - G. M. Trevelyan, third son of the 2nd Baronet, was a distinguished historian. Trevelyan College, Durham is named after G. M. Trevelyan, and derives its coat of arms from that of the Trevelyan family.
- The 3rd Baronet, Charles Phillips Trevelyan, was a Liberal, and later Labour politician.
- The 4th Baronet, George Lowthian Trevelyan, was a teacher, craftsman in wood and New Age thinker.

The release of historical records has shown that much of the wealth of the family derived from the holding of slaves in Grenada. In 2023, at least 42 members of the Trevelyan family signed a formal apology to victims of slavery, and donated a fund to pay voluntary reparations.

== Trevilian, later Trevelyan baronets, of Nettlecombe (1662) ==
- Sir George Trevilian, 1st Baronet (c. 1635–1671)
- Sir John Trevelyan, 2nd Baronet (1670–1755)
- Sir George Trevelyan, 3rd Baronet (1707–1768)
- Sir John Trevelyan, 4th Baronet (1735–1828)
- Sir John Trevelyan, 5th Baronet (1761–1846)
- Sir Walter Calverley Trevelyan, 6th Baronet (1797–1879)
- Sir Alfred Wilson Trevelyan, 7th Baronet (1831–1891)
- Sir Walter John Trevelyan, 8th Baronet (1866–1931)
- Sir Willoughby John Trevelyan, 9th Baronet (1902–1976)
- Sir Norman Irving Trevelyan, 10th Baronet (1915–1996)
- Sir Edward Norman Trevelyan, 11th Baronet (born 1955)

The heir apparent is the present holder's only son Reed Edward Trevelyan (born 1996).

== Trevelyan baronets, of Wallington (1874) ==
- Sir Charles Edward Trevelyan, 1st Baronet (1807–1886)
- Sir George Otto Trevelyan, 2nd Baronet (1838–1928)
- Sir Charles Philips Trevelyan, 3rd Baronet (1870–1958)
- Sir George Lowthian Trevelyan, 4th Baronet (1906–1996)
- Sir Geoffrey Washington Trevelyan, 5th Baronet (1920–2011)
- Sir Peter John Trevelyan, 6th Baronet (born 1948)

The heir apparent is the present holder's only son Julian Miles Trevelyan (born 1998).
