= Sir George Trevelyan, 4th Baronet =

British educational pioneer

The Right Honourable Sir George Trevelyan Bt
- Born: 5 November 1906; London, England
- Died: 9 February 1996 (aged 89)
- Education: Sidcot School
- Alma mater: Trinity College, Cambridge
- Occupations: Educator, new age thinker, public speaker
- Title: 4th Trevelyan Baronet (1958–1996)
- Parents: Charles Trevelyan (father); Mary Bell (mother)
- Relatives: Sir Hugh Bell (grandfather); Florence Bell (grandmother)
- Awards: Right Livelihood Award (1982)

Sir George Lowthian Trevelyan, 4th Baronet (5 November 1906 – 9 February 1996) was a British educational pioneer who was prominent in the New Age movement. In 1942, after listening to a lecture by Dr Walter Stein, a student of Rudolf Steiner, he transitioned from being agnostic to a new age spiritual thinker, and even studied anthroposophy in the coming years. He first became a history teacher at Gordonstoun School, pioneering radical education methods. After World War II, in 1948, he became the Warden at Attingham Park, a pioneering adult education college in Shropshire, from which he retired in 1971 to found the Wrekin Trust, an educational charity. He was subsequently associated with the Soil Association, the Findhorn Foundation, the Teilhard de Chardin Society and the Essene Network. In the last 15 years of his life he was the focus of many lecture tours and meetings. He also wrote numerous books, including A Vision of the Aquarian Age (1977), Operation Redemption (1981), Summons to a High Crusade (1985) and finally Exploration into God (1991). He was awarded the Right Livelihood Award in 1982 for "educating the adult spirit to a new non-materialistic vision of human nature."

== Early life and education ==
Trevelyan was the eldest child of Sir Charles Trevelyan, 3rd Baronet, and Mary Katherine Bell, a younger half-sister of Gertrude Bell and the daughter of Sir Thomas Bell, 2nd Baronet. He was proud of this ancestry, which he imagined linked him to Sir Trevillian, one of King Arthur's knights, who swam ashore on horseback when Lyonesse finally sank. Legend says that Sir Trevillian emerged with a mighty effort from the waves and landed safely on the dry land of Cornwall. He grew up in his family's Northumberland home, Wallington Hall, which his father gave to the National Trust, effectively disinheriting Trevelyan. He studied at Sidcot School, a Quaker school in Somerset.

In 1925, he went to read history at Trinity College, Cambridge, in accordance with family tradition. Whilst there he began his 42-year-long association with the famous 'Trevelyan Man Hunt', an extraordinary annual event which involved a chase on foot over the wild Lakeland fells, with human 'hunters' hunting after human 'hares'. This energetic event was started in 1898 by Trevlyan's historian uncle G. M. Trevelyan and the Geoffrey Winthrop Young, and still continues today, as a kind of hide and seek game without dogs or weapons.

== Career ==
After leaving Cambridge, Trevelyan went on to teach at Gordonstoun, which at that time was a school pioneering a radical education. Later, he became involved as a teacher of the Alexander Technique for postural integration, and apprenticed himself to a furniture designer and master craftsman in wood, Peter Waals, working at Waals' workshop in the Cotswold hills. Trevelyan himself made many fine pieces of furniture, including a bed in which he finally died, as he wished.

In 1931, Trevelyan took the first class F. Matthias Alexander gave for future teachers of the Alexander Technique.

In 1942, after hearing a lecture given by Dr Walter Stein, a student of Rudolf Steiner, Trevelyan discovered a spiritual world-view. During his lifetime he explored beliefs in angels, the calming effects of crystals and the power of ley lines, alongside organic farming and communal living.

In 1947, after his wartime military service, Trevelyan was appointed Warden and Principal of Attingham Park, an adult training college in Shropshire, where he carried out his pioneering work in the teaching of spiritual knowledge as adult education. The courses ranged from chamber music and drama onto esoteric subjects such as 'Finding the Inner Teacher' and 'Holistic Vision'. The latter attracting large numbers of participants, many of them from other countries as well as Britain. The college was jointly sponsored by the local authority, Shropshire County Council, and the University of Birmingham, both of whom looked askance at Trevelyan's attraction towards the mystical; and so it took immense moral courage, for instance, for him to present a course on 'Death and Becoming', a subject that was in those days virtually taboo.

He was involved in the establishment of the Findhorn Foundation, the Gatekeeper Trust, and through his friendship with Wellesley Tudor Pole, the Chalice Well and the Lamplighter Movement.

In 1971, he set up the Wrekin Trust to promote spiritual education and knowledge

In 1982, he was a recipient of the Right Livelihood Award.

== Personal life ==
He married Helen Lindsay-Smith (died 1994) in 1940, and the couple had an adopted daughter.

== Bibliography ==
- Twelve Seats at the Round Table (written with Edward Matchett) (1976, Neville Spearman)
- The Active Eye in Architecture (1977, Wrekin Trust, also illustrated by Trevelyan. Now available online only)
- A Tent in Which To Pass A Summer Night (written with Belle Valerie Gaunt) (1977, Coventure)
- A Vision of the Aquarian Age (1977, Coventure UK and 1984, Stillpoint USA, now available online only)
- Magic Casements – The Use of Poetry in the Expanding of Consciousness (1980, Coventure and republished 1996, Gateway Books, now available online only). Includes poems by various authors, and much of the Trevelyan text previously published in A Tent in Which To Pass A Summer's Night
- Operation Redemption: A Vision Of Hope In An Age Of Turmoil (1981, Turnstone)
- The Pattern of Initiation in the Evolution of Human Consciousness (written with Peter Dawkins). (Francis Bacon Research Trust, 1981).
- Summons to a High Crusade (1986, Findhorn Press: 12 of Trevelyan's lectures at the Findhorn Foundation)
- Exploration into God: A Personal Quest For Spiritual Unity (1991, Gateway Books, now available online only)
- Aquarian Redemption: A Trilogy (1994, Stillpoint. Slipcase bound edition collecting together A Vision Of The Aquarian Age, Operation Redemption & Exploration Into God)
- Sir George Trevelyan And The New Spiritual Awakening (biography of Trevelyan by Frances Farrer, 2002, Floris Books)
- Awakening Consciousness (selected lectures of Trevelyan compiled by Keith Armstrong, 2008, Godstow Press)

Baronetage of the United Kingdom
Preceded by Charles Trevelyan	Baronet (of Wallington); 1958–1996	Succeeded by Geoffrey Washington Trevelyan
