= George Ramsden =

George Ramsden may refer to:

- J. George Ramsden, municipal politician in Toronto, Ontario, Canada
- George Taylor Ramsden, British member of parliament
