= Florence Bell (writer) =

British writer and playwright

Dame Florence Bell DBE JP
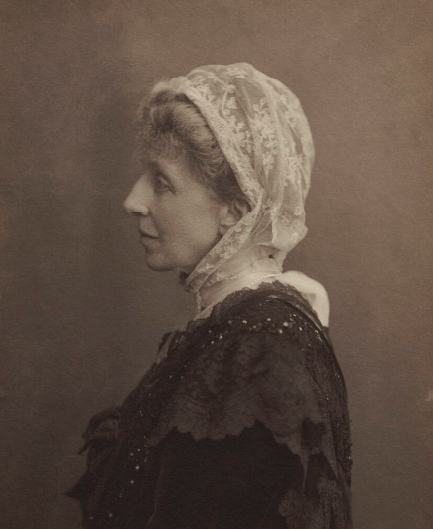
- by "J. Weston & Son" 1910s
- Born: Florence Eveleen Eleanore Olliffe; 9 September 1851; Paris, France
- Died: 16 May 1930 (aged 78); Chelsea, London, England
- Occupations: Writer, playwright
- Spouse: Sir Hugh Bell, 2nd Baronet (m. 1876)
- Writing career
- Period: 20th century
- Genres: Plays, fiction

Dame Florence Eveleen Eleanore, Lady Bell, DBE, JP (née Olliffe; 9 September 1851 – 16 May 1930) was a British writer and playwright. She was a daughter of the Irish physician Joseph Francis Olliffe.

== Biography ==
Bell was born in Paris, France in 1851, the youngest of four children of Irish-born Joseph Francis Olliffe (later Sir Joseph Olliffe) and Laura Cubitt. She was the second wife of Sir Hugh Bell, 2nd Baronet, of Rounton Grange, and was styled Lady Bell. The couple had three children:

- Hugh Lowthian Bell (21 October 1878 – 2 February 1926)
- Florence Elsa Bell (c. 1880 – 3 May 1971, married Admiral Sir Herbert Richmond)
- Mary Katherine Bell, OBE (c. 1882 - 8 October 1966, married Charles Philips Trevelyan)

Bell was the stepmother to her husband's children from his first marriage: British explorer and key political figure in the Middle East, Gertrude Bell (1868–1926) and Maurice, 3rd Baronet (1871–1944).

In 1918 she was appointed as Dame Commander of the Order of the British Empire (DBE). She died on 16 May 1930 at her home, 95 Sloane Street, Chelsea.

== Works ==
- Alan's Wife (with Elizabeth Robins, 1893)
- A Collection of Plays and Monologues for the Drawing Room
- At the Works: Study of a Manufacturing Town, Middlesbrough (1907)
- The Heart of Yorkshire (1923) a pageant play, written as part of the fundraising efforts towards the restoration of York Minster's Five Sisters window
- The Letters of Gertrude Bell, Volume 1 (1927)
- The Letters of Gertrude Bell, Volume 2 (1927)
- French Without Tears: Book I
- French Without Tears: Book II
- French Without Tears: Book III
- Petit theâtre des enfants: twelve tiny french plays for children
- ’Chantez, mes enfants! Chansons populaires mimées et sans gestes, rondes, etc avec accompagnement de piano choisies et arrangées par Lady Bell’ 1918
