= Charles Trevelyan =

Charles Trevelyan may refer to:

- Sir Charles Trevelyan, 1st Baronet (1807–1886), civil servant and governor of Madras
- Sir Charles Trevelyan, 3rd Baronet (1870–1958), his grandson, member of parliament
