= Mary Trevelyan (Lady) =

British political hostess and voluntary worker

Mary Trevelyan OBE
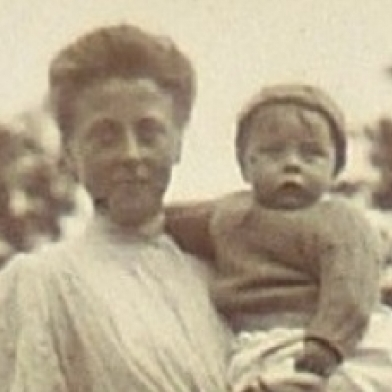
- in 1907
- Born: Mary Katherine Bell; 12 October 1881; Kirkleatham, England
- Died: 8 October 1966 (aged 84); Newcastle upon Tyne, England
- Known for: political hostess and voluntary worker
- Spouse: Sir Charles Trevelyan, 3rd Baronet (m. 1904; died 1958)
- Children: 7, including George
- Parents: Sir Hugh Bell (father); Florence Olliffe (mother)
- Relatives: Gertrude Bell (half-sister); Sir Maurice Bell (half-brother); Admiral Herbert Richmond (brother-in-law)

Mary "Molly" Katherine, Lady Trevelyan, OBE (née Bell; 12 October 1881 – 8 October 1966) was an English political hostess and voluntary worker. She was an active member of several organisations and she was on the founding committee of the Council for the Preservation of Rural England.

== Life ==
Trevelyan was born in Kirkleatham in 1881. She was the last child of Sir (Thomas) Hugh Bell, second baronet and his second wife, Florence Bell (born Oliffe). Her father who was an ironmaster had been married before and he had two children including the explorer and diplomat Gertrude Bell. Her mother was a playwright and writer who wrote for adults and children including the children's "Cat and Fiddle Book".

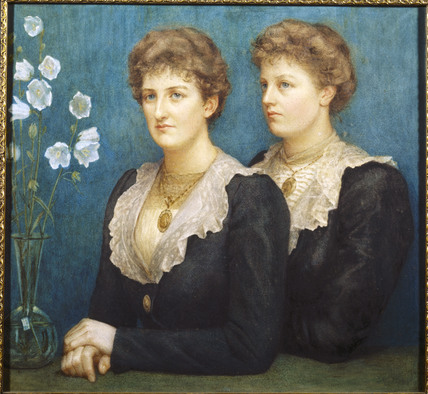
Elsa and Mary Bell (later Lady Trevelyan) by Caroline Grosvenor

In 1899, Caroline Grosvenor created a portrait of her and her younger sister Florence (Elsa). The watercolour is still at Wallington Hall.

In 1904, she became the President of the Northumberland Women's Liberal Association. She was a supporter of women's suffrage, and involved with the Girl Guides and the Associated Country Women of the World.

She began a diary in 1898 and she kept these until 1917 as these are extant. In 1904 she recorded her marriage to Charles Trevelyan including an itemised list of gifts and givers that was published in the newspaper.

When the Council for the Preservation of Rural England was created in 1926. She joined the CPRE's first committee helping to create descriptions of the organisations aims and objectives. The CPRE had been formed by a number of groups and this included the W.I. Trevelyan sat on the National Federation of Women's Institutes committee and she became their representative and a CPRE founding committee member.

In 1928, her father in law died and they moved into Wallington Hall. In 1938 she had a terrace created at the west end of the hall's garden. She recorded in her diary in 1939 that the tradition at Christmas was that the whole family would begin the day in their double bed at Wallingham before going to the main hall where simple presents would be laid out in age order. The Christmas lunch was prepared by the servants with her husband carving the turkey.

In 1942, her socialist husband donated Wallington Hall, complete with its large estate of farm land, to the National Trust.

== Death and legacy ==
She died in 1966. The Trevelyan papers are held by Newcastle University including her diaries and her extensive photograph albums.
