= Look at the world =

Choral composition by John Rutter

- Harvest anthem by John Rutter
- Text: by John Rutter
- Language: English
- Composed: 1996
- Published: 1996
- Duration: 4.5 minutes
- Scoring: Mixed-voice or children's choir with keyboard or orchestra

"Look at the world" is a sacred choral composition by John Rutter, a harvest anthem to his own words. He offered versions for children's choir in unison or a mixed-voice choir, with keyboard or orchestra. It was commissioned by the Council for the Protection of Rural England. The work was published by Oxford University Press in 1996.

== History ==
Rutter set "Look at the world" as a harvest anthem to his own lyrics in 1996. He responded to a commission from the Council for the Protection of Rural England, meant to be "a widely-usable choral song or anthem on the theme of the environment and our responsibility towards it". It was meant to celebrate the organisation's 70th anniversary. He scored it for either a children's choir in unison or a four-part mixed choir, accompanied by a keyboard instrument or orchestra. The anthem was published by Oxford University Press in 1996. In 2021, a version for a small ensemble of flute, oboe, harp and organ appeared.

== Music ==
The anthem is in set in 2/2, marked "Brightly" It begins in C major, but modulates twice and ends in D major. It begins with eight measures of instrumental introduction, with broken chords in constant flowing eighth-notes. It is in four stanzas and a refrain, beginning "Praise to thee, O Lord of all creation". In the mixed-voice version, only the refrain is in harmony for all four voices, while the stanzas are assigned to varying voices. The third stanza is in B major, and the final stanza in D major. The duration is given as 4.5 minutes.

== Recordings ==
The anthem was recorded for a 2003 collection of Rutter's Mass of the Children and other sacred music, by the Cambridge Singers and the City of London Sinfonia conducted by the composer. It was recorded for a 2010 collection, A Song in Season of works by Rutter composed since 1996 and mostly not previously recorded, with the composer conducting the Cambridge Singers and the Royal Philharmonic Orchestra. A reviewer from Gramophone described it as "overtly innocent".
