= Maurice Bell =

Maurice or Morris Bell may refer to:

- Sir Maurice Bell, 3rd Baronet (1871–1944), British soldier
- Morris Frederick Bell (1849–1929), American architect

== See also ==
- Bell (surname)
