= Joseph Olliffe =

Joseph Olliffe may refer to:

- Joseph Benjamin Olliffe (1835–1930), Australian politician
- Joseph Francis Olliffe (1808–1869), British physician
