= Mary-Ann Ochota =

British broadcaster and anthropologist

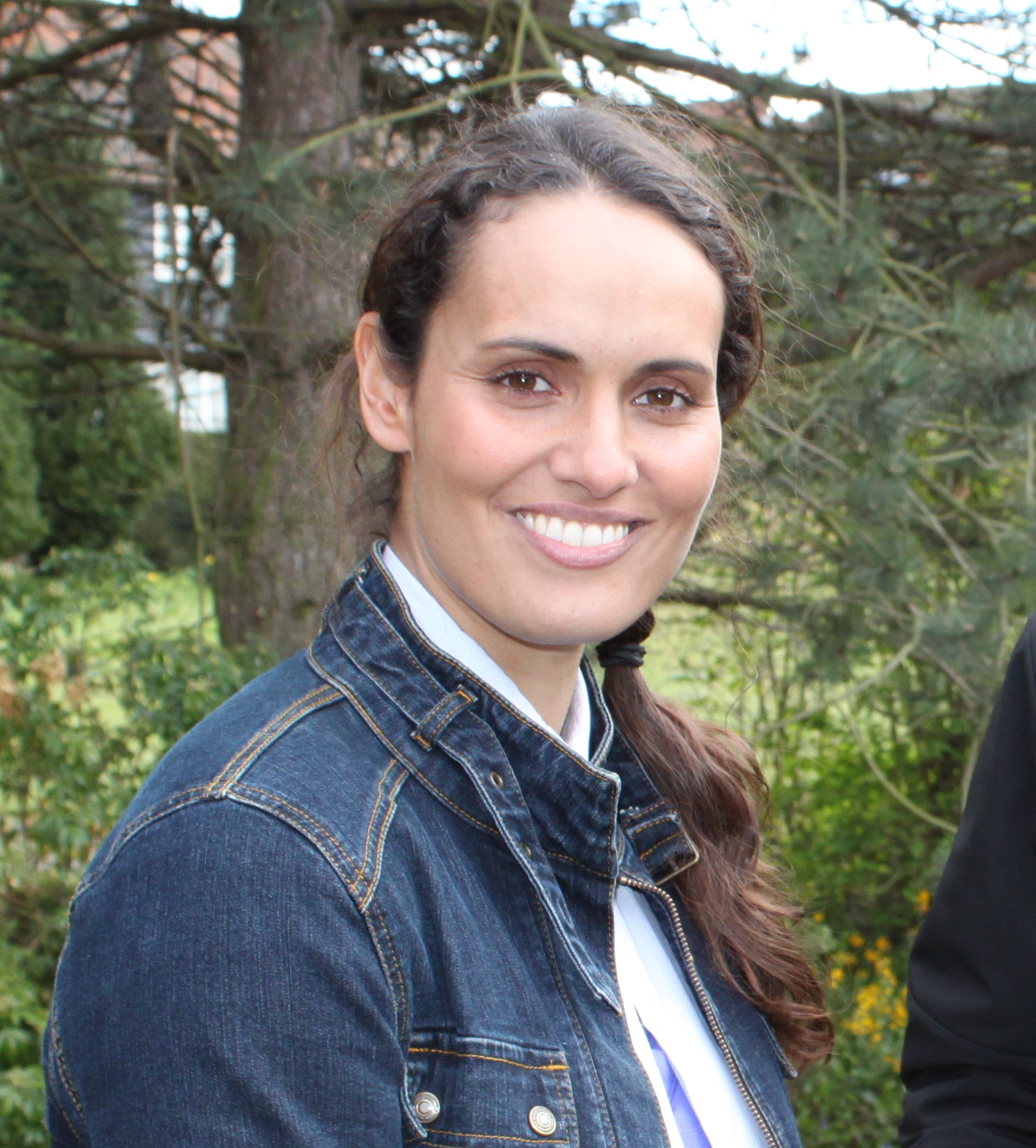
- Ochota in 2012
- Born: 8 May 1981 (age 45); Wincham, England, UK
- Education: Sir John Deane's College, Northwich, Cheshire; Emmanuel College, Cambridge (BA)
- Occupations: TV presenter, writer and anthropologist
- Years active: 2007–present
- Notable work: TV presenter: Time Team; Mystic Britain. Author: Hidden Histories: A Spotter's Guide to the British Landscape (2016), Secret Britain: Unearthing Our Mysterious Past (2020)
- Spouse: Joe Craig (m. 2008)
- Children: 2
- Website: maryannochota.com

Mary-Ann Ochota (Polish pronunciation: [ɔˈxɔta] O-hot-ah; born 8 May 1981) is a British broadcaster specialising in anthropology, archaeology, social history and adventure factual television.

She is a Fellow of the Royal Geographical Society.

== Early life ==
Ochota was raised in Wincham, Northwich, Cheshire, to an Indian mother and a Polish father. She studied at the sixth-form college of Sir John Deane's College.

In 2002, she took a BA in Archaeology and Anthropology from Emmanuel College, Cambridge, specialising in Social Anthropology. She represented her college in the 2013 University Challenge Christmas Special, reaching the final, against Gonville and Caius College, Cambridge.

In 2008, she married children's author Joe Craig.

== Presenting on TV ==
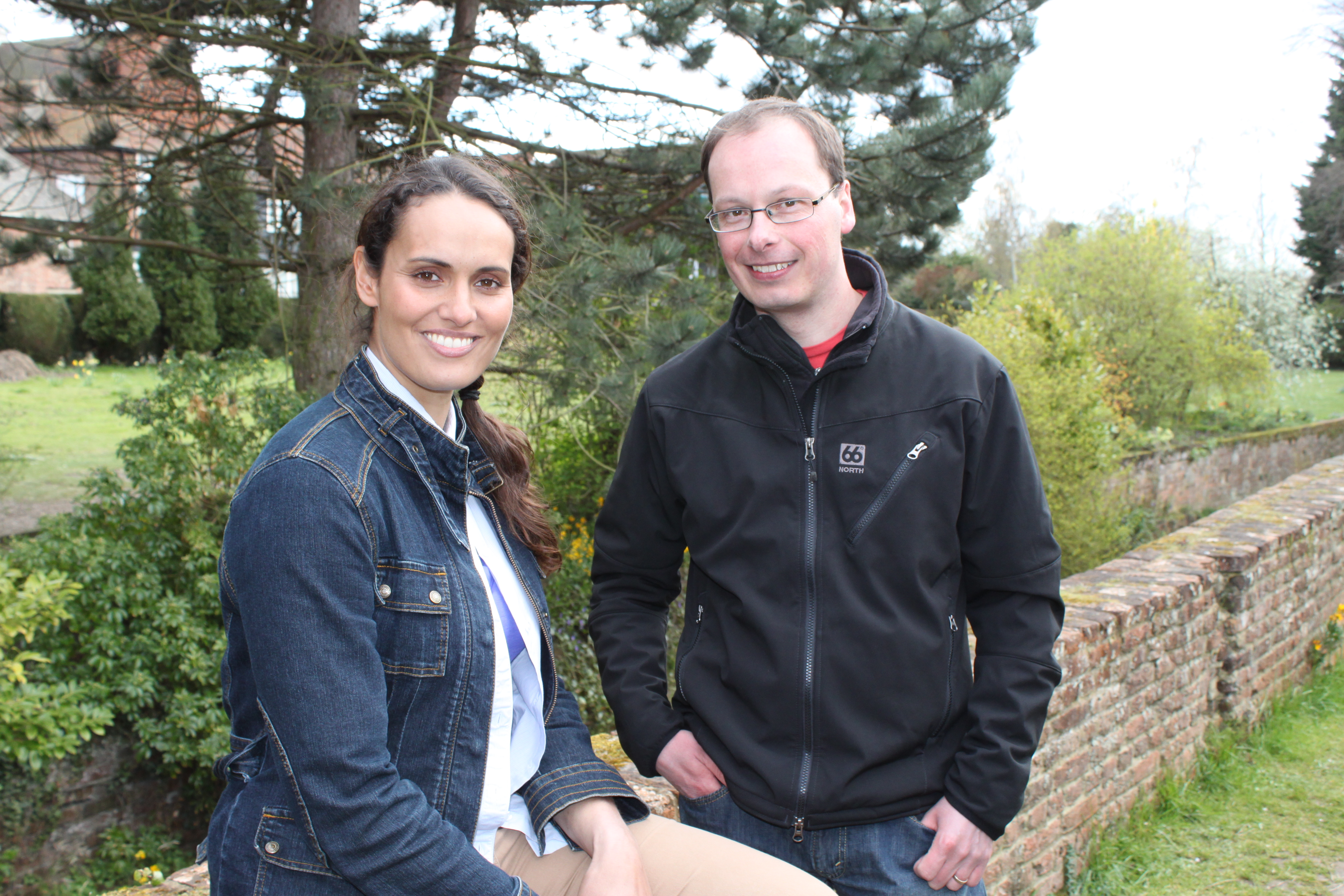
Ochota (left) with Michael Lewis during the filming of Britain's Secret Treasures, 2012

Ochota reported for Channel 4's foreign affairs documentary strand, Unreported World. Her first film for the series, India's Slumkid Reporters, was broadcast in September 2013; her second, Kickboxing Kids, was broadcast in 2014.

She contributed to series 1 and 2 of the ITV archaeology programme Britain's Secret Treasures presenting the history of artefacts including the Pegsdon Mirror, Putney "Brothel" Token, Stone Priory Seal Matrix, Lincoln Roman Statue, Canterbury Pilgrim Badges and the wreck of HMS Colossus.

In Britain's Secret Homes (ITV, 2013), she presented the stories of life at Creswell Crags, Derbyshire; St Mungo's Home for Working Girls, London; the Knap of Howar, Orkney, and the Broch of Mousa, Shetland.

Ochota presented the three-part series Raised Wild for Animal Planet (broadcast as Feral Children in the UK), investigating cases of "feral" children, defined as children either raised by or with animals, or children who had survived for a significant period in the wild. There were three episodes in Season 1, in Uganda, Ukraine and Fiji.

Ochota was the co-presenter for Series 19 (2012) of Channel 4's archaeology show Time Team with Tony Robinson.

In 2016, Ochota presented the series Best of Enemies for German television, in which she travelled around Britain to find out what the British really think about the Germans. The series was aired on the German channel ARD-alpha in English with German subtitles.

In 2017, Ochota presented a six-part BBC series called Britain Afloat travelling the waterways of Britain, discovering how boats have shaped our lives and exploring the regional distinctiveness of boat design and the floating way of life. One episode was featured in TV review show Gogglebox.

Ochota was co-presenter (with Clive Anderson) on the Smithsonian Channel archaeology and history series Mystic Britain (2018–2020). It garnered praise for the witty delivery of serious research. Both series of Mystic Britain were acquired by and shown on Channel 5 in 2023.

In 2023, Ochota featured on BBC1's flagship outdoors show Countryfile, talking about her passion for landscape archaeology and the Ridgeway trail.

Ochota is a regular reviewer on the Sky News weekend paper review.

== Radio and podcasts ==
Ochota's notable radio documentaries for the BBC World Service include A Dirty Secret about global sanitation, Why We Cut Men exploring the history and impact of male circumcision in USA and Uganda,Will the Unicorns of the Sea Fall Silent? about threats to narwhals in the Arctic Ocean, and a three-part series, Walking The Iron Curtain, tracing the history, ecology and modern communities living along the route of the Iron Curtain cold war boundary.

Ochota was also a regular presenter of episodes for the long-running World Service anthropology series The Why Factor exploring aspects of human life including surrogacy, pet ownership, dark tourism, the appeal of dinosaurs, veganism, restaurants and a special episode on The World's Marriage Story, on the eve of Price Harry's marriage to Meghan Markle in 2018.

For BBC Radio 4 Ochota has featured as a correspondent on long-running strand From Our Own Correspondent and has presented radio documentaries including The Lost Sounds Orchestra about sound in the past, and Open Country Exercise Shallow Grave about how archaeology can help military personnel recover from trauma. She produced and presented Open Country Highlands With Horses, joining a group travelling with horses on a modern pilgrimage along St Columba's Way to Iona in west Scotland.

Ochota co-hosted the Audible podcast series Happiness and How to Get It with comedian Charlie George. In it, the two presenters interviewed experts and tried out the practical tips to see whether they worked.

Ochota was co-host of Wiley Science Communication podcast This Study Shows, with physicist Professor Danielle George. The series profiled international scientists, researchers and communicators on how to connect researchers to the world, share information on complex topics, engage the public, and create more impact from their work.

Ochota was a guest on Clive Anderson's interview series, My Seven Wonders where interviewees are invited to select their personal list of Seven Wonders. Ochota's selection included a chocolate bar, a village in the Democratic Republic of Congo, and the Taj Mahal

She has also been interviewed by Sarah Williams for the Tough Girl podcast and featured on Private Passions on BBC Radio 3.

== Writing ==
Ochota writes regularly for newspapers including The Guardian, The Observer and The Daily Telegraph on countryside issues and outdoor activities.

In 2021, Ochota was shortlisted for the "Outdoor Personality of the Year" Award hosted by TGO magazine. Following this recognition, she became a regular columnist for the magazine. She has argued that UK deer populations must be heavily managed, that the UK has low levels of "ecological literacy" and better inclusion in the outdoors must include increasing size ranges of outdoor clothing. Ochota has also called for a "land justice revolution" by expanding the Right to Roam in England and Wales.

In 2023, Ochota won the Outdoor Feature of the Year at the Outdoor Writers and Photographers Guild Awards for a feature on walking the Trotternish Ridge in Skye and recovering confidence after childbirth.

Ochota's first book, published by Headline in 2013, in association with the British Museum and ITV accompanied the TV series of the same name, Britain's Secret Treasures.

Her second book, Hidden Histories: A Spotter's Guide to the British Landscape, was published by Frances Lincoln in 2016 and was shortlisted as a New Statesman Book of the Year.

Her third book, also published by Frances Lincoln, was Secret Britain: Unearthing Our Mysterious Past.

Her fourth book will be published by Pan Macmillan, on the history of humans.

== Outdoor achievements and roles ==
Ochota joined the Clipper Round the World Yacht Race in 2012 on Leg 8, racing Edinburgh Inspiring Capital from Qingdao, China to San Francisco, USA. She sailed as a fully active crew member, and blogged for international adventure magazines while at sea.

Ochota was part of an expedition exploring Australia's Simpson Desert in 2015, joining a team of archaeologists, botanists and zoologists looking for evidence of human settlement and influence. She wrote about the expedition for Geographical magazine.

She has written about her love of the outdoors and adventure activities, including wild camping, orienteering and UK scuba diving.

Ochota served as the British Mountaineering Council Hill Walking Ambassador from 2016 to 2024. In that time, she hosted two series of the BMC podcast Finding Our Way, showcasing people with diverse backgrounds and life experience who are active in walking, climbing and mountaineering. She also featured in a short film as she climbed the Inaccessible Pinnacle on Skye and presented a series of walking guides to the Lake District, Great Walks.

Ochota is a member of the Natural England Landscape Advisory Panel, serving as one of the independent experts advising the board.

Ochota was one of the founders of the local campaign to protect free access to Hatfield Park in Hertfordshire. The stately home owned by Lord Salisbury had, until December 2020, allowed local people to walk in the parkland for free. The Estate announced a new scheme requiring payment for access, which prompted a petition against the charges. The campaign failed and Hatfield Park continues to charge for access. Ochota wrote about her battle against the "paywalling" of green space.

== Charity and honorary roles ==
In July 2024, Ochota was elected President of CPRE, the Countryside Charity. She was previously interviewed by CPRE and described time spent in green space as "a wonder drug".

Ochota served as a trustee of wild places charity John Muir Trust from 2022 to 2023. She wrote about the importance of inclusion and diversity in the outdoors and environment sectors. Following her resignation, she raised public concerns about governance and staff welfare at the charity.

Ochota is the patron of the Ridgeway National Trail, which runs between Ivinghoe Beacon in Buckinghamshire and Avebury in Wiltshire.

Ochota is a life member of the Open Spaces Society.

Ochota is a patron of The Tony Trust, a small grant-giving charity that helps young people afford the cost of Outdoor Activity courses.

Ochota served as a "Loo-Minary" for charity appeal Toilet Twinning, which is run by charity Tearfund. She travelled to the Democratic Republic of Congo to learn more about their work. She wrote about the visit for the BBC website. and for From Our Own Correspondent.

== Other work ==
In her early 20s, Ochota featured as a model in several commercials including Kellogg's Special K.

She has been chair and interviewer at the Institute of Art and Ideas philosophy festival How The Light Gets In in Hay on Wye, and hosted events for British Museum, Science Museum, Royal Institution, British Library and CBI.

Ochota has hosted business programmes for ITN including Cities of the Future and More Than Skin Deep with the British Skin Foundation. She also hosted the ITN Business podcast Business Extra, reflecting on the outcomes of COP28.

Ochota has developed and performed "archaeological storytelling" shows with professional storyteller Jason Buck, telling stories that build on archaeological science, then take a "leap of imagination". Ochota and Buck have performed their shows at venues including the British Museum, Salisbury Museum and Butser Ancient Farm.

In 2021, Ochota was a contestant on Celebrity Pointless. She and team mate Adam Hart Davis won the episode. Ochota gave her winnings to The Tony Trust, of which she is a patron.
