= 1899 Elland by-election =

UK parliamentary by-election

A by-election was held for the British House of Commons in the constituency of Elland on 8 March 1899.

== Vacancy ==
The seat became vacant following the retirement on grounds of ill-health of the sitting Member of Parliament, Thomas Wayman.

== Electoral history ==
Thomas Wayman

General election 1895: Elland
Party	Candidate	Votes	%	±%
Liberal	Thomas Wayman	5,387	51.5	−8.4
Conservative	Arthur Travis Clay	5,081	48.5	+8.4
Majority		306	3.0	−16.8
Turnout		10,468	83.6	+15.3
Liberal hold		Swing	-8.4	

== Candidates ==
The Liberal candidate was Charles Philips Trevelyan, opposed by the Unionist Philip Foster.

== Campaign ==
Important issues in the campaign included the Liberal demands for disestablishment of the Church of England, school building, and payment for Members of Parliament. According to The Times, "One of the Unionist placards told the electorate if they wanted their rates and taxes raised, if they wished to pay members of Parliament, and to build Board schools where they were not required, they must vote for Mr Trevelyan; but if they wanted peace, good trade, and their rates and taxes raised, then they ought to vote for Mr Foster".

== Result ==
When the count, which took just two hours and seven minutes, was completed, the result was as expected: a hold for the Liberal Party, with a majority of around three times what it had been in the last election.

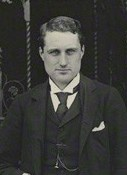
C.P. Trevelyan

Elland by-election, 1899
Party	Candidate	Votes	%	±%
Liberal	Charles Philips Trevelyan	6,041	54.4	+2.9
Conservative	Philip Staveley Foster	5,057	45.6	−2.9
Majority		984	8.8	+5.8
Turnout		11,098	85.9	+2.3
Liberal hold		Swing	+2.9	

Since the Conservative vote was only slightly less than the last time despite an increase of about 4–500 in the electorate, the Liberals claimed this as a sign that "radicalism was growing right through the West Riding".

== Aftermath ==
Trevelyan would go on to hold the seat until the general election of 1900;

General election 1900: Elland
Party	Candidate	Votes	%	±%
Liberal	Charles Philips Trevelyan	6,154	57.7	+3.3
Conservative	Edward Feetham Coates	4,512	42.3	−3.3
Majority		1,642	15.4	+6.6
Turnout		10,666	81.1	−4.8
Liberal hold		Swing	+3.3	

== See also ==
- Elland (UK Parliament constituency)
- List of United Kingdom by-elections
