= Harry Earnshaw (trade unionist) =

British trade union leader (1891–1977)

Harry Earnshaw OBE (25 March 1891 – 2 April 1977) was a British trade union leader who served as Chair of the Labour Party.

Earnshaw was born in Blackburn to Haworth and Alexandra Earnshaw, who worked in the cotton mills. He became active in the Amalgamated Association of Beamers, Twisters and Drawers (Hand and Machine), a small cotton industry trade union based in Lancashire, and was elected as its general secretary in 1940. As its only full-time employee, he acted as its first point of contact, as well as leading the union and representing it on external bodies.

The Beamers were affiliated to the United Textile Factory Workers' Association (UTFWA), and Earnshaw served on its executive for many years. Raymond Streat considered him to be one of the more militant members of the executive, tending to side with Archie Robertson against the more moderate approach of Alfred Roberts.

Earnshaw achieved greatest prominence through his connection with the Labour Party. From 1942 until 1962, he served on the party's National Executive Committee, as the nominee of the UTFWA, and in 1951 he was elected as Chair of the Labour Party. The Observer described him as "serious and diffident, sometimes wrong but always quite selfless, quiet, friendly and charitable... an impressive symbol of all the simple, decent people who believe in the party's mission". In 1947, Earnshaw travelled to Rome with Denis Healey to represent the Labour Party at the annual congress of the Italian Socialist Party. While there, they visited Pope Pius XII. Healey recorded that the Pope told Earnshaw, "you must recognise that you carry a great responsibility", to which Earnshaw responded "aye, Pope, and so do you".

In 1951, Earnshaw was appointed as the General Secretary of the General Federation of Trade Unions, to take up the role the following year, when his sting as Chair of the Labour Party ended. However, he was unable to find affordable accommodation in London, and so withdrew before taking up the post.

Earnshaw was appointed an Officer of the Order of the British Empire (OBE) in the 1953 Coronation Honours.

Trade union offices
Preceded by James Stott	General Secretary of the Amalgamated Association of Beamers, Twisters and Drawers (Hand and Machine); 1940–1961	Succeeded by Alan Green
Party political offices
Preceded by Alice Bacon	Chair of the Labour Party; 1951–1952	Succeeded by Arthur Greenwood
