= Charles Roden Buxton =

British philanthropist and politician

Member of Parliament for Elland
- In office 30 May 1929 – 7 October 1931
- Preceded by: William C. Robinson
- Succeeded by: Thomas Levy

Member of Parliament for Accrington
- In office 15 November 1922 – 16 November 1923
- Preceded by: Ernest Gray
- Succeeded by: J. Hugh Edwards

Member of Parliament for Ashburton
- In office January 1910 – December 1910
- Preceded by: Ernest Morrison-Bell
- Succeeded by: Ernest Morrison-Bell

Personal details
- Born: 27 November 1875 London, England
- Died: 16 December 1942 (aged 67) Peaslake, Surrey, England
- Party: Liberal (until 1917); Labour (from 1917)
- Other political affiliations: Independent Labour Party
- Spouse: Dorothy Frances Jebb (m. 1904)
- Children: 2

Charles Roden Buxton (27 November 1875 – 16 December 1942) was an English philanthropist and radical British Liberal Party politician who later joined the Labour Party. He survived an assassination attempt during a mission to the Balkans in 1914.

== Early life ==
He was born in London, the third son of Sir Thomas Buxton, 3rd Baronet and his wife Lady Victoria Buxton. His elder brother Noel Buxton was a prominent figure in British politics, as was his cousin Sidney Buxton.

He grew up on the family estate in Essex and was educated at Harrow and Trinity College, Cambridge, taking a first in Classics and becoming president of the Cambridge Union. After leaving university he travelled to South Australia, where his father was Governor, as well as other locations in France, the Far East, India and America.

He took up law and was called to the bar in 1902. He gave lectures at Morley College and was principal there from 1902 to 1910. He wrote articles on various subjects and edited the Albany Review from 1906 to 1908.

== Political career ==
He stood as a Liberal candidate in Hertford in 1906 and Ashburton in 1908. Eventually he was elected as a Member of Parliament in Ashburton in 1910 but lost his seat in the second election of that year. In 1914 he, along with his brother Noel, made his way to Bulgaria. They had stopped in Bucharest, Romania in October 1914. While there, an assassination attempt was made on them, by Turkish activist, Hasan Tahsin. He was shot through the lung, but survived. His brother also was wounded in the jaw. Tashsin was captured and sent to prison for five years.

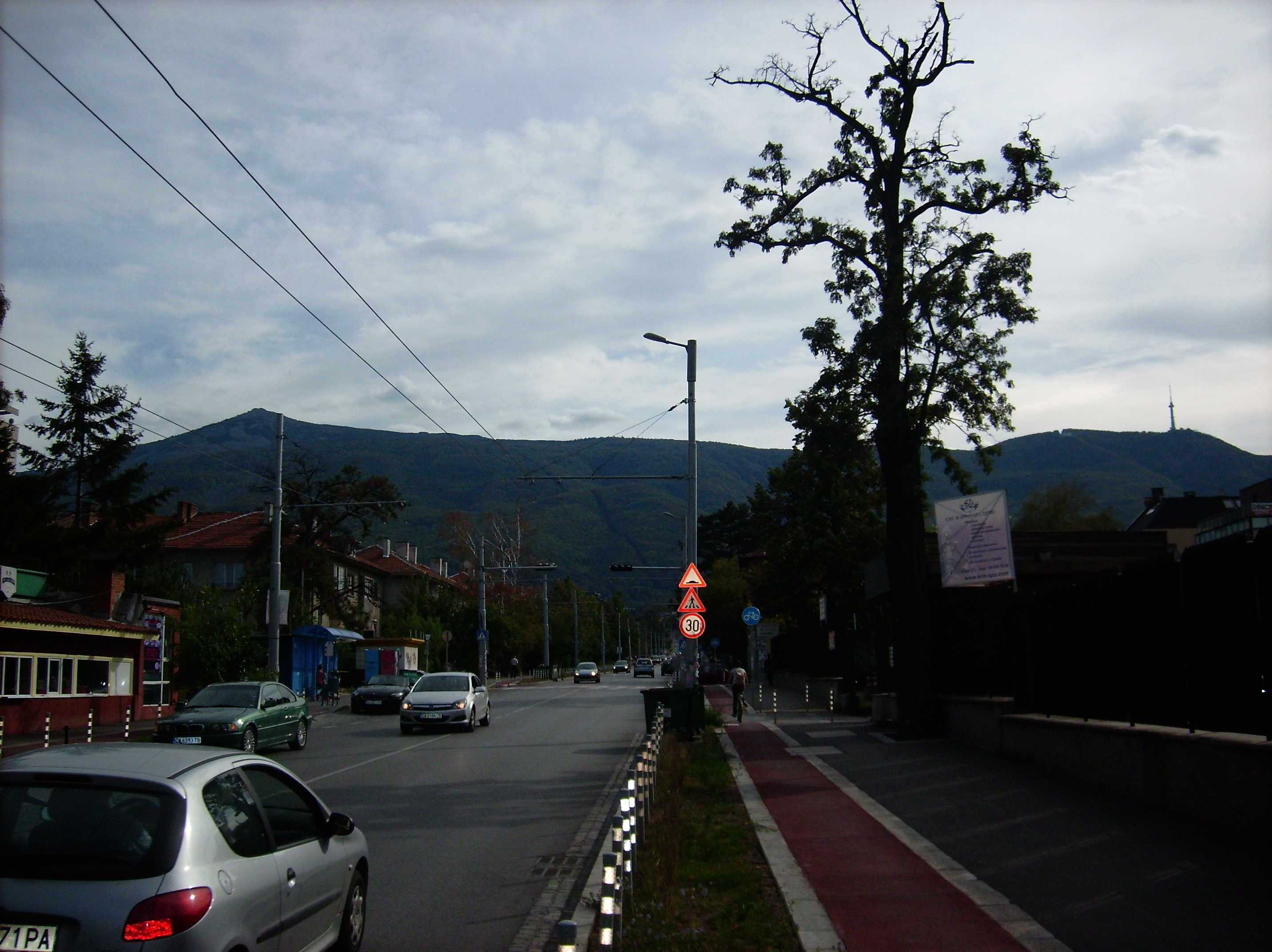
A view of Vitosha from the boulevard named after the brothers Noel & Charles Buxton in Sofia, Bulgaria (42°39.943′N 23°16.521′E)

During the First World War, he was one of the minority arguing for a negotiated peace and was a founder member of the Union of Democratic Control.

In 1917, he left the Liberal Party and joined the Independent Labour Party (ILP). As secretary to the Labour Party's delegation to the Soviet Union in 1920, he was very impressed by what he saw, and wrote a book about it, In A Russian Village (1922).

1918 he contested Accrington for the Labour Party and lost, won the seat in 1922, and lost again in 1923. He won the seat of Elland in 1929, but was defeated in 1931 and 1935.

Buxton was always much more effective behind the scenes, acting as policy advisor on foreign and colonial issues to the Labour Party. He showed particular interest in the rights of indigenous people of Africa, and travelled widely in the continent.

Another of his interests was Esperanto, becoming president of the international society of Quaker Esperantists.

With Dorothy, he became a member of the Society of Friends. They were eager campaigners for peace, and were critical of what they perceived as the unfairness to Germany of the treaty of Versailles. Shortly before the outbreak of World War II they still argued that peace could be attained by responding to German grievances. The outbreak of war was a great disappointment to them both.

On 29 July 1939, Buxton held a private discussion about an Anglo-German agreement with the German embassy counsellor Theodor Kordt. His proposals included ending Britain's negotiations with the Soviet Union. He stated that he represented neither the Labour Party nor the British government. The historian Helmut Metzmacher questioned whether Buxton acted on government instructions or obtained his plan from Horace Wilson.

== Last years and death ==
Charles retired from politics in 1939 and lived in his daughter's house in Peaslake, Surrey, where he died and was buried in 1942. Although he had two children, he left most of his estate to charity.

== Family ==
In 1904 Buxton married Dorothy Frances Jebb. The Jebbs, a well-off family, had a strong social conscience and commitment to public service; her mother, Eglantyne Louisa Jebb, had founded the Home Arts and Industries Association, to promote Arts and Crafts among young people in rural areas, her sister Louisa would help found the Women's Land Army in World War I, and Dorothy and her sister Eglantyne Jebb co-founded the international charity and movement Save the Children.

The Buxtons lived a frugal lifestyle — on their walking tours in the south of England, they were sometimes mistaken for tramps — and moved to Kennington, a working class area of London. They had two children and later moved to Golders Green.

== See also ==
- List of peace activists

== Notes ==
Parliament of the United Kingdom
Preceded by Ernest Morrison-Bell	Member of Parliament for Ashburton; January–December 1910	Succeeded by Ernest Morrison-Bell
Preceded by Ernest Gray	Member of Parliament for Accrington; 1922–1923	Succeeded by J. Hugh Edwards
Preceded by William C. Robinson	Member of Parliament for Elland; 1929–1931	Succeeded by Thomas Levy
Party political offices
Preceded by George Benson	Treasurer of the Independent Labour Party; 1924–1927	Succeeded by Fred Jowett
