= Amalgamated Association of Beamers, Twisters and Drawers (Hand and Machine) =

Former trade union of the United Kingdom

AABTD
- Amalgamated Association of Beamers, Twisters and Drawers (Hand and Machine)
- Members transferred: Manufacturing, Science and Finance
- Founded: 1866
- Dissolved: 2002
- Headquarters: 27 Every Street, Nelson, Lancashire
- Location: United Kingdom
- Members: 5,237 (1907); 1,065 (1980)
- Key people: William Cornforth Robinson (Secretary)
- Affiliations: GFTU, NCTTF, TUC

The Amalgamated Association of Beamers, Twisters and Drawers (Hand and Machine) (AABTD) was a British trade union which existed between 1866 and 2002. It represented skilled workers in the cotton industry who were responsible for preparing warp yarns prior to weaving.

== History ==
The union was founded in 1866 as the Amalgamated Association of Beamers, Twisters and Drawers by the loose amalgamation of several district unions. It was reconstituted in 1889, and officially registered the following year. In 1915, it added "Hand and Machine" to its name. By this time, it had also affiliated to the United Textile Factory Workers' Association.

The union's large number of affiliates included:

Union	Founded	Membership (1907)	Notes
Accrington	1885	101	Merged into Accrington, Church and Oswaldtwistle 1971
Ashton-under-Lyne	1860	171	Merged into Hyde and District in 1967
Bacup and District	1901	85	Merged into Rossendale Valley 1963
Bamber Bridge	1882	66	Merged into Preston 1930s
Barnoldswick	1925	N/A	Dissolved 1970. Earlier union active 1906–1970
Blackburn	1866	706	Merged into Blackburn and Bolton 1971
Bolton	1892	266	Merged into Blackburn and Bolton 1971
Burnley and District	1878	498	Dissolved 1983
Bury	1890	105	Merged into Rochdale and District 1973
Chorley and District	1892	174	Merged into Blackburn and Bolton 1971
Church and Oswaldtwistle	1867	102	Merged into Accrington, Church and Oswaldtwistle 1971
Clayton-le-Moors	1900	41	Dissolved 1920s
Clitheroe and District	1892	70	Dissolved 1940s
Colne and District	1895	214	Dissolved 1983
Darwen	1892	252	Merged into Blackburn and Bolton 1971
Earby and District	1905	33	Dissolved 1960
Farington	1903	N/A	Merged into Preston 1906
Great Harwood	1860	109	Dissolved 1950s
Hadfield and Glossop	1895	56	Merged into Hyde and District 1920s
Haslingden	1886	75	Merged into Rossendale Valley 1963
Heywood	1890	102	Merged into Rochdale and District 1973
Hyde and District	1902	72	Merged into Colne and District 1976
Leigh and Bedford	1890	67	Merged into Bolton 1940s
Littleborough	1893	60	Merged into Rochdale and District 1967
Longridge	1870	31	Merged into Preston 1950s
Macclesfield	1894	30	Dissolved 1920s
Manchester	1865	136	Dissolved 1969
Nelson and District	1893	340	Dissolved 1983
Oldham	1868	109	Dissolved 1963
Padiham	1895	101	Dissolved 1983
Preston	1866	412	Dissolved 1983
Radcliffe	1891	60	Merged into Bury 1972
Ramsbottom	1894	43	Dissolved 1940s
Rawtenstall and District	1891	60	Merged into Rossendale Valley 1963
Rishton	1893	40	Dissolved 1940s
Rochdale and District	1892	157	Merged into Colne and District 1974
Skipton and District	1905	44	Dissolved 1980
Stockport	1906	61	Merged into Hyde and District 1967
Todmorden	1892	201	Dissolved 1983
Wigan and District	1891	60	Merged into Bolton and District 1963

From 1890 until 1932, the union was led by William Cornforth Robinson, a member of the National Executive Committee of the Labour Party, who served two terms as a Member of Parliament. In the 1940s and 1950s, it was led by Harry Earnshaw, also a member of the National Executive Committee.

Although union membership was never large, it remained fairly steady into the 1950s, being 3,924 in 1955. However, it dropped rapidly from the 1960s onwards, as employment in the cotton industry in England declined. Many affiliates merged with each other, with the Blackburn and Bolton Districts of the Amalgamation becoming the largest single affiliate. However, that union was suspended from the Trades Union Congress (TUC) in 1972, as it had registered with the government, in defiance of TUC policy. In response, in 1974, the amalgamation expelled the union, which subsequently collapsed. The following year, the Colne, Nelson and Preston unions began working together with a common general secretary, as the North East Lancashire and Cumbrian District, representing three-fifths of the remaining membership. In 1983, they were dissolved, along with the remaining minor affiliates, and the former North East Lancashire and Cumbrian District took over the leadership of the amalgamation.

By 1980, the union had only 1,065 members, and by 1989 this had declined to just 470, although its members were determined not to merge into a larger union. Given the precipitous decline in membership, it disaffiliated from the Trades Union Congress in 1992, and eventually its remaining members transferred to Manufacturing, Science and Finance in 1998, with the union being formally dissolved in 2002.

== General Secretaries ==
J. Ashton
1890: William C. Robinson
1932: James Stott
1940: Harry Earnshaw
1962: Alan Green
1964: James Bleackley
1968: G. Borrah
1974: F. Sumner
1982: A. Little
1985: Albert H. Edmundson
1991: Tony Brindle
