= Thomas Levy =

British politician (1874–1953)

Thomas Levy (1874 – 14 February 1953) was a British Conservative member of parliament. He was the son of Lewis Levy, from Denmark Hill in south London, and was educated at the City of London School.

In the First World War, he was assistant executive officer of food control, in Bournemouth. During the General Strike of 1919 he was officer in command of transport.

In 1931 he was elected to the House of Commons as a Conservative, as member of parliament (MP) the Elland constituency in Yorkshire, a seat he held in 1935 but lost in the election of 1945.

From 1932 to 1935 he was chairman of the Parliamentary Textiles Committee, and then from 1935 to 1939 of the Parliamentary Tariff Policy Committee. As a backbencher he introduced a bill to reform the firearms laws, which eventually became the Firearms Act 1934.

From 1939 to 1940 he was chairman of the British Wool Advisory Committee. He married in 1901 and had two daughters.

Parliament of the United Kingdom
Preceded by Charles Buxton	Member of Parliament for Elland; 1931–1945	Succeeded by Frederick Cobb
