= Robert Kay (politician) =

English solicitor and politician

Sir Robert Newbald Kay (6 August 1869 – 24 February 1947) was an English solicitor and politician, based in York. He was also Liberal Member of Parliament for Elland from 1923 to 1924, and Lord Mayor of York in 1925.

The second of five children of William Kay and his wife Ann (née Newbald) of Bossall, Kay passed his final Law Society examinations in 1892 and the next year he founded the law firm of Newbald Kay in York which had its offices at Lendal adjacent to the Mansion House, where he lived as Lord Mayor.

Along with his wife Alice May, daughter of the Wesleyan minister, Thomas Thornton Lambert, Kay was a prominent Methodist, being for a time a member of the Methodist Conference and funded the construction of a chapel in Acomb, North Yorkshire.

For his wartime services as Sheriff of York, 1914–1915, and chairman of the local recruiting committee, he was knighted in the 1920 New Year Honours.

He was Lord Mayor of York in 1924/25, and his sheriff was Stanley Slack, headmaster of Elmfield College.

== Elmfield College and Kay's property speculation ==
Around 1929, he became a governor of Elmfield College and was instrumental in closing the college down during the Great Depression. He bought the college estate, demolished the buildings, and sold off the estate off as building plots, having previously worked with H. B. Workman on managing the school's merger and decline.

Kay's maiden speech in the House of Commons also indicated Kay's interest in encouraging people to own their own houses.

His brother, Joseph Hudson Kay (1871–1919), was the Wesleyan minister of Hoyland.

== Footnotes ==
Parliament of the United Kingdom
Preceded by William C. Robinson	Member of Parliament for Elland; 1923–1924	Succeeded by William C. Robinson
