= Elland (constituency) =

Parliamentary constituency in the United Kingdom, 1885–1950

Coordinates: 53.692°N 1.803°W

- Former county constituency for the House of Commons
- County: West Riding of Yorkshire
- Major settlements: Elland, Brighouse

1885–1950
- Created from: Northern West Riding of Yorkshire
- Replaced by: Brighouse and Spenborough, Bradford South, Halifax and Sowerby

Elland was a parliamentary constituency in the West Riding of Yorkshire that existed between 1885 and 1950. It elected one Member of Parliament (MP) to the House of Commons of the United Kingdom, by the first-past-the-post voting system.

Situated between Bradford in the North, Halifax in the West, and Huddersfield to the south, it included the mining town of Brighouse and the wool centre of Elland. With a sizeable Nonconformist population (estimated at 15 per cent in 1922), it was natural Liberal territory, and was a fairly safe Liberal and later Labour seat, falling to the Conservatives only in the 'khaki election' of 1918 and the Labour collapse of 1931. In the 1918 redistribution it lost some territory and it was abolished in 1950. A sizeable part of the area was transferred to the new Brighouse and Spenborough seat.

== Boundaries ==
1885–1918:

1918–1950: The Municipal Borough of Brighouse, the Urban Districts of Clayton, Elland, Greetland, Hipperholme, Queensberry, Shelf, Southowram, and Stainland, and the Rural District of Halifax except the parish of Norland.

== Members of Parliament ==
Election	Member	Party
1885	Thomas Wayman	Liberal
1899 by-election	Charles Trevelyan	Liberal
1918	George Taylor Ramsden	Unionist
1922	William C. Robinson	Labour
1923	Sir Robert Kay	Liberal
1924	William C. Robinson	Labour
1929	Charles Buxton	Labour
1931	Thomas Levy	Conservative
1945	Frederick Cobb	Labour
1950	constituency abolished	

== Elections ==
=== Elections in the 1880s ===
Wayman

General election 1885: Elland
Party	Candidate	Votes	%	±%
Liberal	Thomas Wayman	6,516	65.3	
Conservative	Carne Rasch	3,457	34.7	
Majority		3,059	30.6	
Turnout		9,973	84.2	
Registered electors		11,851		
Liberal win (new seat)				

General election 1886: Elland
Party	Candidate	Votes	%	±%
Liberal	Thomas Wayman	Unopposed		
Liberal hold				

=== Elections in the 1890s ===
General election 1892: Elland
Party	Candidate	Votes	%	±%
Liberal	Thomas Wayman	5,497	59.9	N/A
Conservative	James Hope	3,676	40.1	New
Majority		1,821	19.8	N/A
Turnout		9,173	68.3	N/A
Registered electors		13,437		
Liberal hold		Swing	N/A	

Wayman

General election 1895: Elland
Party	Candidate	Votes	%	±%
Liberal	Thomas Wayman	5,387	51.5	−8.4
Conservative	Arthur Travis Clay	5,081	48.5	+8.4
Majority		306	3.0	−16.8
Turnout		10,468	83.6	+15.3
Registered electors		12,526		
Liberal hold		Swing	-8.4	

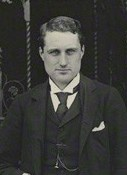
Trevelyan

1899 Elland by-election
Party	Candidate	Votes	%	±%
Liberal	Charles Trevelyan	6,041	54.4	+2.9
Conservative	Philip Foster	5,057	45.6	−2.9
Majority		984	8.8	+5.8
Turnout		11,098	85.9	+2.3
Registered electors		12,926		
Liberal hold		Swing	+2.9	

=== Elections in the 1900s ===
General election 1900: Elland
Party	Candidate	Votes	%	±%
Liberal	Charles Trevelyan	6,154	57.7	+6.2
Conservative	Edward Coates	4,512	42.3	−6.2
Majority		1,642	15.4	+12.4
Turnout		10,666	81.1	−2.5
Registered electors		13,146		
Liberal hold		Swing	+6.2	

General election 1906: Elland
Party	Candidate	Votes	%	±%
Liberal	Charles Trevelyan	7,609	65.8	+8.1
Conservative	Thomas Brooke-Hitching	3,962	34.2	−8.1
Majority		3,647	31.6	+16.2
Turnout		11,571	83.7	+2.6
Registered electors		13,828		
Liberal hold		Swing	+8.1	

=== Elections in the 1910s ===
General election January 1910: Elland
Party	Candidate	Votes	%	±%
Liberal	Charles Trevelyan	7,469	61.4	−4.4
Conservative	George Taylor Ramsden	4,686	38.6	+4.4
Majority		2,783	22.8	−8.8
Turnout		12,155	87.1	+3.4
Liberal hold		Swing	-4.4	

General election December 1910: Elland
Party	Candidate	Votes	%	±%
Liberal	Charles Trevelyan	6,613	59.2	−2.2
Conservative	George Taylor Ramsden	4,549	40.8	+2.2
Majority		2,064	18.4	−4.4
Turnout		11,162	80.0	−7.1
Liberal hold		Swing	-2.2	

General Election 1914–15:

Another General Election was required to take place before the end of 1915. The political parties had been making preparations for an election to take place and by July 1914, the following candidates had been selected;

- Liberal: Charles Trevelyan
- Unionist: George Taylor Ramsden

Trevelyan

General election 1918: Elland
Party		Candidate	Votes	%	±%
C	Unionist	George Taylor Ramsden	8,917	38.4	−2.4
	Liberal	Harry Dawson	7,028	30.4	−28.8
	Labour	Dennis Hardaker	5,923	25.6	New
	Independent Labour	Charles Trevelyan	1,286	5.6	New
Majority			1,889	8.0	N/A
Turnout			23,154	67.0	−13.0
Registered electors			34,584		
	Unionist gain from Liberal		Swing	+13.2	
C indicates candidate endorsed by the coalition government.

=== Elections in the 1920s ===
General election 1922: Elland
Party	Candidate	Votes	%	±%
Labour	William C. Robinson	10,590	36.8	+11.2
National Liberal	Robert Kay	10,160	35.3	+4.9
Unionist	George Taylor Ramsden	8,039	27.9	−10.5
Majority		430	1.5	N/A
Turnout		28,789	81.9	+14.9
Registered electors		35,145		
Labour gain from Unionist		Swing	+3.2	

General election 1923: Elland
Party	Candidate	Votes	%	±%
Liberal	Robert Kay	12,476	50.9	+15.6
Labour	William C. Robinson	12,031	49.1	+12.3
Majority		445	1.8	N/A
Turnout		24,507	70.0	−11.9
Registered electors		35,008		
Liberal gain from Labour		Swing	+1.7	

General election 1924: Elland
Party	Candidate	Votes	%	±%
Labour	William C. Robinson	11,690	39.5	−9.6
Unionist	Albert Braithwaite	11,202	37.8	New
Liberal	Robert Kay	6,713	22.7	−28.2
Majority		488	1.7	N/A
Turnout		29,605	84.1	+14.1
Registered electors		35,214		
Labour gain from Liberal		Swing	+9.3	

Buxton

General election 1929: Elland
Party	Candidate	Votes	%	±%
Labour	Charles Buxton	17,012	43.7	+4.2
Unionist	Sam Howard	11,150	28.7	−9.1
Liberal	William Haughton Sessions	10,734	27.6	+4.9
Majority		5,862	15.0	+13.3
Turnout		38,896	83.6	−0.5
Registered electors		46,499		
Labour hold		Swing	+6.7	

=== Elections in the 1930s ===
General election 1931: Elland
Party	Candidate	Votes	%	±%
Conservative	Thomas Levy	25,378	65.2	+36.5
Labour	Charles Buxton	13,563	34.8	−8.9
Majority		11,815	30.4	N/A
Turnout		38,941	82.5	−1.1
Conservative gain from Labour		Swing	+22.7	

General election 1935: Elland
Party	Candidate	Votes	%	±%
Conservative	Thomas Levy	19,498	52.2	−13.0
Labour	Charles Buxton	17,856	47.8	+13.0
Majority		1,642	4.4	−26.0
Turnout		37,454	77.2	−5.3
Conservative hold		Swing	-13.0	

=== Elections in the 1940s ===
General Election 1939–40: Another General Election was required to take place before the end of 1940. The political parties had been making preparations for an election to take place from 1939 and by the end of this year, the following candidates had been selected:

- Conservative: Thomas Levy
- Labour: Gilbert Mitchison

General election 1945: Elland
Party	Candidate	Votes	%	±%
Labour	Frederick Cobb	19,632	50.3	+2.5
Conservative	Thomas Levy	11,570	29.7	−22.5
Liberal	John Wilson	7,805	20.0	New
Majority		8,062	20.6	N/A
Turnout		39,007	79.9	+2.7
Labour gain from Conservative		Swing	+12.5	

== See also ==
- Elland, a market town in England
- Ellands, a surname
