= William C. Robinson (politician) =

British politician (1861–1931)

Robinson in 1923

William Cornforth Robinson (12 July 1861 – 11 June 1931) was a British Labour Member of Parliament. Born in Carlton, West Riding of Yorkshire, he began work at the age of ten in a mill in Burnley. At the age of 17 he organised a trade union after experiencing a 20-week-long strike. By 1894 he had become the general secretary of the Amalgamated Association of Beamers, Twisters and Drawers, a position he held to the end of his life. He was president of the United Textile Factory Workers Association from 1913 to 1919. For many years he was a member of the Labour Party National Executive.

In 1911 and 1918 he ran for election at Oldham, and again in 1920 in Ashton-under-Lyne. He was elected at Elland in 1922 but lost the seat in 1923. He won it again in 1924 and held it until 1929.

Parliament of the United Kingdom
Preceded by George Taylor Ramsden	Member of Parliament for Elland; 1922–1923	Succeeded by Sir Robert Kay
Preceded by Sir Robert Kay	Member of Parliament for Elland; 1924–1929	Succeeded by Charles Buxton
Party political offices
Preceded by Keir Hardie	Chair of the Labour Party; 1910–1911	Succeeded by Ben Turner
Trade union offices
Preceded by J. Ashton	General Secretary of the Amalgamated Association of Beamers, Twisters and Drawers; 1890 – 1931	Succeeded by James Stott
Preceded by William Mullin	President of the United Textile Factory Workers' Association; 1913 – 1919	Succeeded by Walter Gee
Preceded by Edward L. Poulton and Herbert Smith	Trades Union Congress representative to the American Federation of Labour; 1923; With: Robert Barrie Walker	Succeeded by Charlie Cramp and Alonzo Swales
