= Wrekin Trust =

Former British charity for spiritual education

The Wrekin Trust was a charity (Charity number: 262303) founded by Sir George Trevelyan in 1971, under the active encouragement of Air Marshal Victor Goddard. Its stated purpose is non-sectarian spiritual education. It aims to create "safe meeting spaces for connections, dialogue, learning and social action." The Wrekin Trust is now closed.
