= Joseph Francis Olliffe =

Sir Joseph Francis Olliffe FRCP (1807 – 14 March 1869) was an Irish physician.

== Early life ==
Sir Joseph Olliffe was born in 1807 in Cork, Ireland. His father was Joseph Olliffe (c. 1776 – 1830), a merchant of Cork. His mother was Elizabeth McCarthy (1777 – 10 March 1851), who was the daughter of Charles McCarthy of Sunville, County Limerick. Joseph Oliffe was baptized on July 9, 1807 in St. Mary's parish, Cork, County Cork, Ireland, son of Joseph Oliffe and Eliz. McCarthy.

== Career ==
He was educated in Paris, and graduated Master of Arts at the university in 1829, receiving his Doctor of Medicine in 1840. For some time he acted as tutor in the family of the Count de Fresnoy, but in 1840 he commenced the practice of medicine in Paris. He was a fellow of the Anatomical Society of Paris, and at one period filled the post of president of the Paris Medical Society.

In 1846, Louis-Philippe appointed Olliffe a knight of the Legion of Honour, and he was promoted to the rank of Officer in 1855 by Napoleon III.

In March 1852 he became physician to the British embassy, and on 13 June 1853 was knighted at Buckingham Palace (Knight Bachelor).

The board of trade nominated him a juror for hygiene, pharmacy, surgery, and medicine in the French international exhibition in April 1855; in 1861 he was appointed one of the committee for sanitary appliances in the international exhibition of 1862. He became a fellow of the Royal College of Physicians of London in 1859. He enjoyed for many years a large practice and considerable social position.

== Marriage and issue ==
On 19 April 1841, Sir Joseph married Laura Cubitt, who was born on 2 February 1823 in St Pancras, London, England and died in 1898 in London. She was the second daughter of William Cubitt, Lord Mayor of London; the couple inherited a large fortune from her father. The couple bore two children:

- Mary Emma Olliffe (1845 - 2 April 1897; married Sir Frank Lascelles)
- Florence Eveleen Eleanore Olliffe (1851 - 16 May 1930; married Sir Thomas Hugh Bell, 2nd Baronet and would later become Dame Florence Bell, DBE)

== Later life ==
Sir Joseph Olliffe was the friend and personal physician of Charles de Morny, Duke of Morny, whom he joined in extensive building operations at Deauville, France.

Sir Joseph Olliffe died in Brighton, England on 14 March 1869.

In 1877, Alphonse Daudet published Le Nabab, which included a fictional character named ‘Dr Jenkins’ from Ireland; this was an unflattering picture of Dr Olliffe.

== Charles Dickens ==
Author Charles Dickens was a friend of Sir Joseph Olliffe. The following letter was written:

Gad’s Hill Place, Higham by Rochester, Kent.

Monday Eleventh May 1868

My Dear Olliffe

If the undersigned Individual (newly arrived in this country from the United States of America) can have, through your kind-ness for him, one or two cases of that excellent Hock, his blessing will attend you. He was lately under the hands of a medical friend of yours, Dr Fordyce Barker of New York, a capital fellow, and always speaking of you as much beholden to you. Love to Lady Olliffe and to all at home who remember him.

Ever faithfully yours Charles Dickens

[Transcribed by SMACGUF]
