= George Taylor Ramsden =

British politician

George Taylor Ramsden (6 April 1879 – 9 October 1936) was a British parliamentarian.

Ramsden was educated at Eton College and Trinity Hall, Cambridge. He was chairman and managing director of Thomas Ramsden & Son Ltd., Brewers, of Halifax. In August 1914, upon the outbreak of World War I, he enlisted in the Royal Field Artillery and obtained the rank of Captain in 1919. He was Mayor of Halifax from 1911 to 1912.

As a Conservative, Ramsden stood for election in Elland at the January and December 1910 general elections, losing on both occasions. He was elected as a Coalition Unionist Member of Parliament (MP) for Elland at the 1918 general election, defeating the sitting Liberal member Charles Trevelyan, who was running as an Independent Labour candidate. He lost the seat to Labour in 1922. He died aged 57 in 1936 in his house in Boston Spa, and was survived by his wife Elizabeth.

Parliament of the United Kingdom
Preceded by Charles Philips Trevelyan	Member of Parliament for Elland; 1918–1922	Succeeded by William Cornforth Robinson
