= Herbert Richmond =

Royal Navy Admiral (1871–1946)

Admiral Sir Herbert Richmond KCB FBA
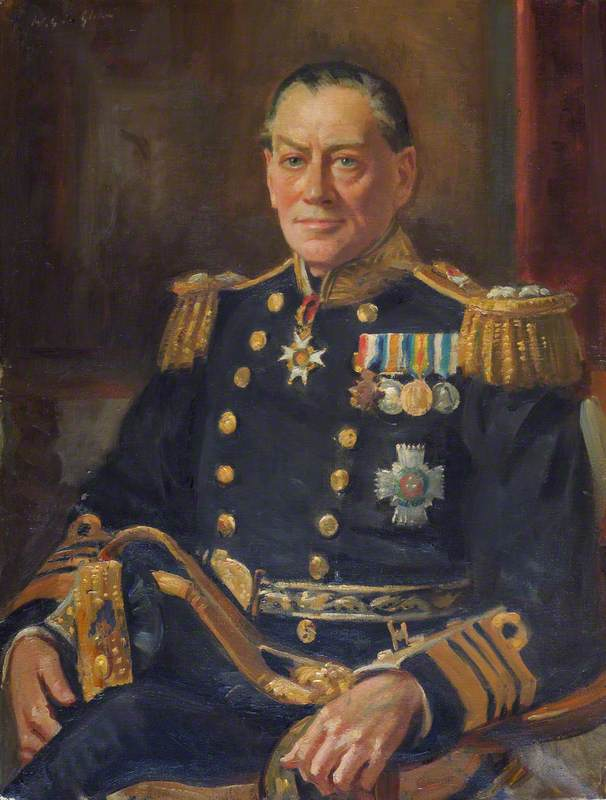
- 1942 portrait by Wilfrid de Glehn

Master of Downing College, Cambridge
- In office 1934–1946
- Preceded by: Albert Seward
- Succeeded by: Lionel Whitby

Personal details
- Born: 15 September 1871 Beavor Lodge, Hammersmith, England
- Died: 15 December 1946 (aged 75) Cambridge, Cambridgeshire, England

Military service
- Allegiance: United Kingdom
- Branch/service: Royal Navy
- Years of service: 1885–1931
- Rank: Admiral
- Commands: Imperial Defence College; East Indies Squadron; Royal Naval College, Greenwich; East Indies Station; HMS Erin; HMS Conqueror; HMS Commonwealth; HMS Vindictive; HMS Furious; HMS Dreadnought
- Battles/wars: First World War
- Awards: Knight Commander of the Order of the Bath

Admiral Sir Herbert William Richmond, KCB, FBA (15 September 1871 – 15 December 1946) was a prominent Royal Navy officer, described as "perhaps the most brilliant naval officer of his generation." He was also a top naval historian, known as the "British Mahan", the leader of the British Royal Navy's intellectual revolution that stressed continuing education especially in naval history as essential to the formation of naval strategy. After serving as a "gadfly" to the British Admiralty, his constructive criticisms causing him to be "denied the role in the formation of policy and the reformations of naval education which his talents warranted", he served as Vere Harmsworth Professor of Imperial and Naval History at Cambridge University from 1934 to 1936, and Master of Downing College, Cambridge from 1934 to 1946.

== Personal life ==
Richmond was the second son of artist Sir William Blake Richmond, son of the portrait painter George Richmond. In July 1907 he married Florence Elsa, elder daughter of the writer Florence Bell and Sir Thomas Hugh Bell. She was half-sister of the diplomat Gertrude Bell.

== Naval career ==
Richmond joined the Royal Navy as a cadet in 1885, serving on the Australian Station and in the Hydrographic Service before qualifying as a torpedo officer in 1897. He began to develop a serious interest in naval history while serving in HMS Empress of India in 1897–98, HMS Ramillies in 1899, and HMS Canopus in 1899–1900, turning himself into a first-rate historian without formal university training.

In 1900–1902 Richmond served in the flagship of the Channel Fleet HMS Majestic. Promoted to commander on 1 January 1903, he was later the same month appointed to the Naval Ordnance Department as an assistant to the Director of Naval Ordnance. In February 1904 he became first officer in HMS Crescent, flagship of the Cape of Good Hope Station. He was assigned to the Admiralty in 1906–08, where he served briefly as naval assistant to Admiral John Fisher, 1st Baron Fisher. In 1907, inspired by the work of civilian naval historian Julian Corbett, Richmond began archive research concerning the naval aspects of the War of the Austrian Succession, which he completed in 1914, but which was not published until 1920 due to the First World War.

Promoted to captain, Richmond commanded HMS Dreadnought from 1909 to 1911, then, in 1911–12, the Torpedo School, training ships HMS Furious and HMS Vindictive. In 1912 he founded the Naval Review in order to promote innovative thought within the Royal Navy.

In 1913 Richmond became assistant director of operations on the Admiralty's Naval Staff, where his frequent memoranda about deficiencies in naval strategy drew the disdain of First Lord of the Admiralty Winston Churchill, and when events proved him right, he was shoveled off as a liaison officer to the Italian Fleet in April 1915, returning from Taranto in September 1915. After this he was given a backwater assignment, command of HMS Commonwealth (part of a pre-dreadnought battle squadron at the Nore) in 1916. After the disappointing 31 May – 1 June 1916 Battle of Jutland resulted in the appointment of his admirer Admiral David Beatty as Grand Fleet CIC in December 1916, assisted by his memorandums that predicted the beginning of unrestricted submarine warfare by Germany beginning 1 February 1917, he received command of HMS Conqueror in the Grand Fleet in April 1917, after which he served as director of staff duties and training in 1918, then commanded HMS Erin in 1919.

In early 1917 Richmond lobbied hard for convoy protection of merchant shipping in the North Sea, but the Admiralty resisted despite mounting losses, waiting until the end of April to experiment. On 17 May 1917 Richmond's friend, Lieutenant Joseph M. Kenworthy had a meeting with British Prime Minister Lloyd George, in which he recommended that Richmond be appointed to his cabinet, to which Lloyd George replied "I have put his name to the Admiralty and they tell me he is only a paper man". On 20 May he met with him again, pressing him to no avail, with Lloyd George saying "If you could put a captain in a sufficiently strong position, Richmond is the man"; nothing came of it.

=== Flag officer ===
Promoted to rear admiral, Richmond was put in charge of the Senior Officers' Course at the Royal Naval College, Greenwich in 1920, which office was merged with the Presidency of the Royal Naval College itself in November 1922. In October 1923 he was assigned as commander-in-chief, East Indies Squadron. Promoted to vice admiral in 1925, he was promoted to Knight Commander of the Order of the Bath (KCB) in the 1926 Birthday Honours. Returning to London in 1927, he became Commandant of the Imperial Defence College. In 1929 he was promoted to admiral and served as president of the International Conference on the Safety of Life at Sea.

== Academic career ==
Following his forced retirement from the Royal Navy in 1931, the University of Cambridge appointed him Vere Harmsworth Professor of Imperial and Naval History, an academic chair he held from 1934 to 1936. In 1934 he was also elected master of Downing College, Cambridge, a post he held until his death in 1946. He delivered the Ford Lectures in English History at Oxford University in 1943 (for the academic year 1943/4). He never published a formal treatise on naval strategy.

In March 1942 Richmond published an article in The Fortnightly Review which charged that the British defeat in the Battle of Singapore in February 1942 was due to "the folly of not providing adequately for the command of the sea in a two-ocean war". In his last book Statesmen and Sea Power (1946), he charged that the defeat was sealed by "the illusion that a Two-Hemisphere Empire can be defended by a One-Hemisphere Navy".

== Impact ==
On 28–29 September 1992 the Naval War College in Newport, Rhode Island gathered naval experts from around the world to examine the works of Richmond and Sir Julian Corbett in the post-Cold War context, resulting in the book Mahan is not Enough (1993), which includes the article "Process: The Realities of Formulating Modern Naval Strategy" by David Alan Rosenberg, showing the importance of leveraging and integrating the expertise of naval historians with naval officers for a full understanding of naval strategy.

== Works ==
- Papers Relating to the Loss of Menorca in 1756 (Navy Records Society, 1913)
- Private Papers of George, Second Earl Spencer, First Lord of the Admiralty, 1794–1801 (2 vols.) (Navy Records Society, 1914)
- The Navy in the War of 1739–48 (Cambridge University Press, 1920)
- Command and Discipline (1927)
- National Policy and Naval Strength and Other Essays by H.W. Richmond; with a foreword by Lord Sydenham of Combe, (New York: Longman, Green and Company, 1928, 1934, 1993)
- The Navy in India, 1763–1783 (1931)
- Economy and Naval Security : A Plea for the Examination of the Problem of the Reduction in the Cost of Naval Armaments on the Lines of Strategy and Policy (Ernest Benn Ltd., 1931)
- Imperial Defence and Capture at Sea in War (1932)
- Naval History and the Citizen: An Inaugural Lecture Delivered before the University on 25 April 1934 (Cambridge University Press, 1934)
- Sea Power in the Modern World (1934)
- The Navy (William Hodge, 1937)
- The Invasion of Britain: An account of plans, attempts & counter-measures from 1586 to 1918 (Methuen & Co., 1941)
- Statesmen and Sea Power The Ford Lectures (1946)
- The Navy as an Instrument of Policy, 1558–1727 Edited by E.A. Hughes. (1953)
- 'How are we going to make war?' Admiral Sir Herbert Richmond and British Far Eastern War Plans by Christopher M. Bell
- Admiral Sir Herbert Richmond by George Macaulay Trevelyan (Cumberledge, 1946)
- The Historical Lessons and Intellectual Rigour of Admiral Sir Herbert William Richmond by Commander Bruce McLennan

Military offices
Preceded by Sir Frederick Tudor	President, Royal Naval College, Greenwich; 1922–1923	Succeeded by Sir George Hope
Preceded by Sir Lewis Clinton-Baker	Commander-in-Chief, East Indies Station; 1923–1925	Succeeded by Walter Ellerton
New title College founded	Commandant of the Imperial Defence College; 1926–1929	Succeeded by W. H. Bartholomew
Academic offices
Preceded by Albert Seward	Master of Downing College, Cambridge; 1936–1947	Succeeded by Lionel Whitby
