= CPRE =

Charity in England

The Campaign to Protect Rural England
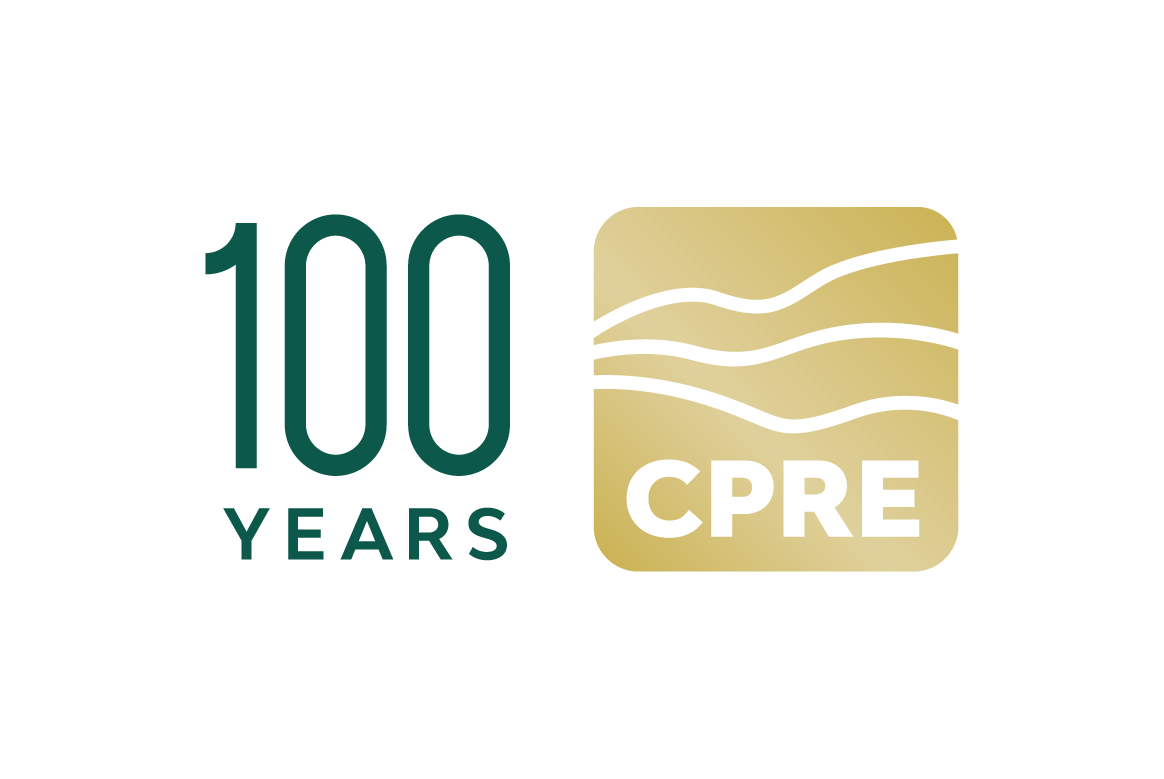
- 100 years of organisation
- Abbreviation: CPRE
- Predecessor: Council for the Preservation of Rural England
- Formation: 1926
- Founder: Sir Patrick Abercrombie
- Type: Charitable organisation
- Registration no.: Registered charity number: 1089685
- Headquarters: 15–21 Provost St, London N1 7NH
- Region served: England
- Members: 40,000
- Patron: King Charles III
- President: Mary-Ann Ochota
- Chair: Simon Murray
- Chief Executive: Roger Mortlock
- Staff: 40
- Volunteers: 1,200
- Website: CPRE

The Campaign to Protect Rural England, formerly known by names such as the Council for the Preservation of Rural England and the CPRE, the countryside charity, is a charity in England. Formed in 1926 by Patrick Abercrombie to limit urban sprawl and ribbon development, CPRE claims to be one of the longest-running environmental groups in the UK. CPRE campaigns for a "sustainable future" for the English countryside. It states it is "a vital but undervalued environmental, economic and social asset to the nation." It aims to "highlight threats and promote positive solutions." It campaigns using its own research to lobby the public and all levels of government.

== History ==
The CPRE was formed following the publication of The Preservation of Rural England by Patrick Abercrombie in 1926. Abercrombie (who was created a Knight Bachelor in 1945) became its Honorary Secretary. The inaugural meeting was held in December 1926 at the London offices of the Royal Institute of British Architects and was addressed by Neville Chamberlain, a future prime minister. Various groups were involved in its formation including the National Trust, the Women's Institute and the Commons Preservation Society. Molly Trevelyan was the WI representative and she served on the founding committee.

The early years

In CPRE's first years, it campaigned for rural planning, for the creation of national parks in especially beautiful areas and used for the recreation of those living in cities, for the reservation of farming belt zones around towns and cities so as to keep fresh produce close to urban markets and against urban sprawl and uncontrolled ribbon development. It also began arguing the case for protecting areas of England's most beautiful countryside, and for setting up green belts to preserve the character of towns and to give town dwellers easy access to the countryside.

In the war years, CPRE was identified as a stakeholder that government ministries were required to consult with over proposed use of land in rural areas for airfields, training camps and war industries.

1941-1960

CPRE campaigning helped lead to the Town and Country Planning Act 1947 and the National Parks and Access to the Countryside Act 1949. There were also CPRE campaigns for subsidies for rural housing and for adequate publicity for planning enquiries. This period also saw the 'Best Kept Village' and 'Keep Britain Tidy' initiatives.

When England's first motorway the M1 was proposed in 1957, CPRE successfully campaigned for it to avoid the heart of Charnwood Forest in Leicestershire (the road was put into a cutting).

1961–1980

CPRE worked on the issues of indestructible plastics, loss of hedgerows, energy infrastructure and the UK coastline. When the M4 was built in 1963 CPRE successfully fought to protect the Berkshire Downs. It also began to seek for tighter control on advertising hoardings along roadsides.

1981–1990

This era saw the creation of protected Areas of Outstanding Natural Beauty, something CPRE had campaigned for along with others. Attention was also paid to campaigns for sustainable energy generation and the use of brownfield land for building. In 1985 in a campaign to reform the EC's Agricultural Structures Directive, CPRE stopped funding for many damaging agricultural activities and secured the first “green” farm payments. In 1988 it helped persuade the Chancellor of the Exchequer to scrap tax incentives favouring blanket conifer plantations in upland areas.

1990 onwards

In 1990 the Government's first ever Environment White Paper accepted the case for hedgerow protection, 20 years after CPRE's campaign was first launched, and in 1997 laws to protect hedgerows finally came into force.

In 1995 CPRE published “tranquillity” maps which show the diminishing areas of the countryside not disturbed by man-made noise, visual intrusion or light pollution. These were updated using a pioneering new methodology in 2006. CPRE also published similar maps focusing solely on light pollution in 2003.

In 1996, English composer John Rutter wrote the words and music for an anthem entitled "Look at the World" in celebration of the 70th anniversary of the CPRE.

In April 2006 CPRE Peak District & South Yorkshire sought to clarify its identity across its vast territory by operating under two distinct identities. Due to its long association with Peak District National Park, the organisation operates as the Friends of the Peak District in the Peak District National Park, High Peak Borough and six parishes of North East Derbyshire (Eckington, Unstone, Holmesfield, Killamarsh, Dronfield, Barlow).

In 2007 CPRE published a series of intrusion maps which are in development which highlighted areas disturbed by the presence of noise and visual intrusion from major infrastructure. The resulting maps show the extent of intrusion in the early 1960s, early 1990s and 2007. They cannot be reproduced.

In July 2024, Mary-Ann Ochota was elected President of the CPRE. She was previously interviewed by CPRE and described time spent in green space as "a wonder drug".

== Campaigns ==
In 2013 there was agreement to place electricity transmission lines underground in some National Parks, something CPRE is still campaigning for.

In 2018 after CPRE's 10-year campaign against drink-container litter, the Government announced that it is considering the introduction of a deposit return scheme to increase recycling rates. It is hoped by CPRE that the scheme will include all single use drink-containers, whether plastic, glass or metal.

According to the main CPRE website, campaigns in 2022 are now grouped under the broad headlines, Dark Skies, Hedgerows, What gets built where, and the Climate Emergency.

Under the Dark Skies heading, in 2013, Star Count was launched. This campaign aimed to stop light pollution by involving the public in star-counting in order to map light pollution across the UK and raise awareness. A related idea is reducing the impact of light pollution, reducing carbon budgets and saving money by pushing councils to adjust street lighting.

Under the What gets built where heading of the website at the time, CPRE included influencing development plans at local, regional and national level. There was also a focus on reducing “clutter” in the form of unnecessary road signs and advertising billboards in the countryside and seeking ways to protect quiet rural roads. Tools to map tranquility in the countryside were being developed for use by local and regional planners. Effort was put into reform of the Common Agricultural Policy and the fight for farmers to be recognised for the work they do in protecting the character of the countryside. Planners are still lobbied to ensure that as many new developments as possible are built on Brownfield (rather than Greenfield) land. In particular CPRE fights for the protection of green belts. There is also emphasis on reducing litter in rural areas across England via local action and events and lobbying government.

Under the Climate emergency heading, support was given to campaigns against 'surface' or opencast mining. CPRE has challenged the government to modify HS2 rail plans to remove all planned out-of-town interchange ("parkway") stations as well as challenging the potential Oxford–Cambridge Expressway. Suggestions have been offered for a range of practical measures to be adopted by central and local government in order to support local food businesses so that they can provide fair and affordable prices. Preliminary work consisted of a five-year research – 'Mapping Local Food Webs' (2007–2012). Campaigns supported farming funding that would stem loss of smaller farms and the diversity they provide (2017). There are campaigns against large-scale fracking operation in the UK, that would destroy large areas of the countryside and exacerbate the global plastic binge (2018).

A photography competition was started in 2016 to celebrate the beauty of Dorset's countryside (2016).

In 2026, campaigns included those on hedgerows, ground and rooftop solar, community energy and new towns.

== Structure ==
CPRE's national office is at 15–21 Provost Street, London, N1 7NH. It also has offices in the eight other regions of England.

In addition there are CPRE branches in each of England's counties and groups in over 200 districts. All but two of the 43 CPRE branches are independent charities of their own. CPRE Durham and CPRE Northumberland are subsidiaries of national CPRE. Each CPRE branch has its own website.

== Publications ==
Members receive a quarterly magazine entitled 'Countryside Voices', and can opt to receive 'Fieldwork' which contains details of campaigns around the UK. Some CPRE branches also produce regular newsletters.

The CPRE promotes a large number of rural attractions such as gardens, houses and museums, by means of its annual Members' Guide. The 2012 Members Guide was supported by the National Farmers Union.

In 2015, CPRE published the 'Warm and Green' report, which shed new light on the scale of the energy problems and the solutions needed to tackle them. During the same year CPRE earned the Bankside Star by contributing significantly to the Together at Christmas gift collection campaign for the homeless, vulnerably housed and elderly people.

In 2025, CPRE published the book '100 years of championing a countryside for all'.

== Influence ==
CPRE has influenced public policy relating to town and country planning in England, most notably in the formation of the National Parks and AONBs in 1949, and of green belts in 1955.

It claims some credit for the slow shift of agricultural policies across Europe away from a price-support philosophy to one of environmental stewardship, a policy shift begun in England. Campaigns against noise and light pollution have been pursued over recent years, and CPRE is now focusing on "tranquillity" as a key aspect of the countryside which CPRE wants to see protected in England's planning policies.

CPRE joined the 10:10 project in 2010 in a bid to reduce their carbon footprint. One year later it announced that it had reduced their carbon emissions (according to 10:10's criteria) by 12%.

== Criticisms and countercriticisms ==
In the UK, there are competing demands on the use of land for biodiversity, food production, housing, recreation, health and well-being. Movements of populations and climate change exacerbate the pressure of these demands. It is thus to be expected that tensions will arise between and among food producers, residents, planners, builders, industrialists, environmentalists and others. Points of view vary significantly and CPRE thus has its critics.

Some critics characterise CPRE as being:

- A proponent of a drawbridge mentality (i.e. "I've moved to the countryside but I don't want others to do likewise") This is sometimes characterised as betraying a NIMBY approach. CPRE counters this by saying that what is needed in rural areas is low-cost rental accommodation or genuinely affordable homes.
- Motivated by Luddite nostalgia. This remark by Nick Boles, Tory planning minister, was countered by Sir Andrew Motion, the president of CPRE at the time, saying, "On just about every level what he said was wrong. Start at the level of fact: he said 9% of our countryside is bricked over; by CPRE reckoning it is actually already more like 12%. And that doesn't take into account the collateral effects of development. About 50% of our land is already compromised in some way or other."
- A supporter of exclusionary planning practices to keep low-income residents out of rural areas.

CPRE has changed its positions on issues over time. For example, in December 2008 George Monbiot of The Guardian interviewed the then CPRE head, Shaun Spiers, about the organisation's opposition to wind farms but not opencast coal mines. George Monbiot asked why he couldn't find any opposition of the CPRE to surface coal mining over the past five years, and pointed out that the negative effects that coal mines cause by removing the soil from large areas are much greater than the negative effects wind energy might have on the countryside. However, perhaps as a result of this pressure, in 2010, campaigning against inappropriate mineral extraction by opencast mining started to be featured under the 'Climate change and natural resources' section of CPRE's website.

In 2011, the CPRE argued that not enough public consultation had been done on HS2 though a 5-month public consultation was currently being run at the time.

The CPRE has been accused by some of exaggerating the threat to rural England and of being alarmist by warning that the Green Belt is in danger of being 'concreted over'. According to a right-wing think tank, the Institute for Economic Affairs, only about one-tenth of the English surface area, (rather than the Green Belt) is 'developed' in the broadest sense; about half of this 'development' consists of domestic gardens, leaving only one-twentieth which is really 'under concrete' (including roads, railways, car parks, etc.). It is nevertheless the case that in 2017/18, 8.9 km^{2} of previously undeveloped Green Belt land changed to a developed use, of which 2.9 km^{2} turned into residential use.

Figures from the British YIMBY movement have criticised the CPRE, accusing it of denying the British housing crisis and significantly underestimating housing need in high-cost areas to justify the inviolability of the Greenbelt. YIMBYs have claimed that this policy denies both rural and urban communities the housing that, if planned correctly, they would want to build. The alleged success of CPRE's campaign to restrict housing on the rural-urban fringe has led John Myers, co-founder of London YIMBY, to describe it as 'the NRA of the UK' (referring to the National Rifle Association of America, rather than the unrelated British NRA). A CPRE report admits more housing is needed but challenges the government statistics on numbers, stating they are based on aspiration rather than observed need.

Criticism has also been targeted at the CPRE's emphasis on the use of brownfield sites over greenfield sites as a first choice for building, accusing it of overstating their ability to meet Britain's housing need. According to the YIMBY movement, this is a distraction from the necessary infill development in and around major urban centres, which is claimed to offer significantly more potential to meet housing need inside urban areas. In October 2020 however, a CPRE report revealed that there is enough brownfield land for 1.3 million new homes and over half a million already have planning permission.

In 2024, CPRE Hertfordshire were criticised by one Hertfordshire local authority about the accuracy of information in the charity's published analysis of a draft Local Plan. Concerns were publicly raised by the local authority that such misinformation could detrimentally affect residents’ abilities to provide a well-informed response to its Draft Local Plan as part of its ongoing consultation.

== CPRE people ==
- Patron: King Charles III
- President: Mary-Ann Ochota
- Chief Executive: Roger Mortlock

Other CPRE people

- Neville Chamberlain – life member, spoke at the launch of CPRE in 1926
- Sir Guy Dawber – first President 1926
- Sir Herbert J G Griffin – General Secretary 1926–1965
- Michael Francis Eden, 7th Baron Henley – President 1973–1977
- Sir Colin Buchanan – President 1980–1985
- David Puttnam, Baron Puttnam – President 1985–1992
- Jonathan Dimbleby – President 1992–1997
- Prunella Scales – President 1997–2002
- Sir Max Hastings – President 2002–2007
- Bill Bryson – President 2007–2012
- Andrew Motion – President 2012–2016
- Emma Bridgewater CBE – President 2016–2023
- Mary-Ann Ochota – President 2024–present

== See also ==
- Campaign for the Protection of Rural Wales
