= Thomas Wayman =

For the polo player, see Tommy Wayman

Thomas Wayman

Thomas Wayman (26 October 1833 – 8 February 1901) was an English politician.

He was educated in private schools in Halifax. He carried on business as a wool-stapler until 1892. He was Mayor of Halifax from 1872 to 1874 and served as a Justice of the Peace in the borough. He was Liberal MP for nearby Elland from 1885 until he retired due to ill-health in 1899. He retired to Banbury, Oxfordshire, and died there on 8 February 1901, aged 67.

Parliament of the United Kingdom
New constituency	Member of Parliament for Elland; 1885–1899	Succeeded by Charles Philips Trevelyan
