= Toilet Twinning =

Charitable project to improve global sanitation

Toilet Twinning is an initiative which invites people to "twin" their own toilet with latrines in poor communities (an analogy with the twin towns and sister cities movement). This is a way of raising funds to enable people in the poorest nations to have clean water and a proper toilet, and to learn about hygiene. Toilet Twinners receive a certificate, containing a photo of the twinned latrine, its location and GPS coordinates.

Toilet Twinning used to be a partnership between two international charities, Christian Outreach for Relief & Development (Cord) and Tearfund, but now is solely a charity under Tearfund. It was formed in 2010, in response to the global sanitation crisis.

== Work ==
In stable communities, Toilet Twinning works through a model of community mobilisation to create locally owned and locally delivered water and sanitation programmes. Hygiene education is a key focus of Toilet Twinning’s work.

In conflict areas, where little infrastructure exists, Toilet Twinning funds programmes that build toilets and provide clean water.

In 2013, field operations delivered water and sanitation programmes in 26 countries.

A number of key individual and organisations have joined the scheme. These include the Welsh National Assembly, the Northern Ireland Assembly, comedian Tim Vine and adventurer Bear Grylls.
