= Sir Hugh Bell, 2nd Baronet =

English industrialist, landowner and county official

Sir Hugh Bell Bt CB JP DL FSA
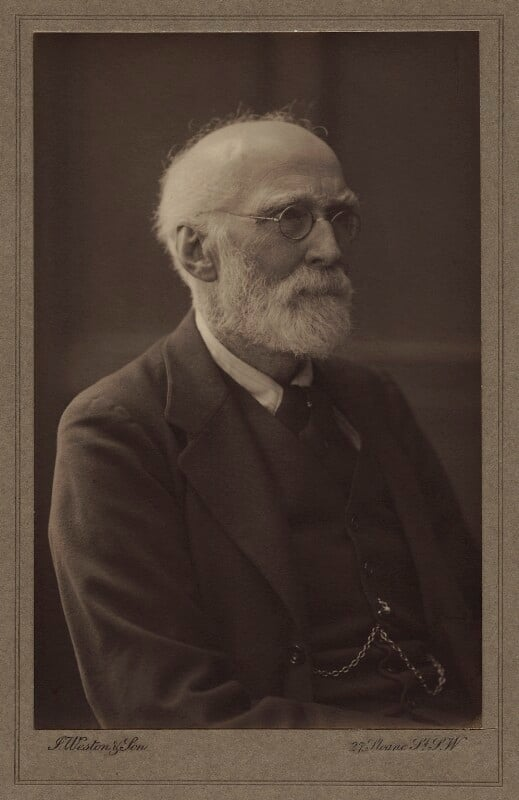
- Bell in the 1910s
- Born: Thomas Hugh Bell; 10 February 1844
- Died: 29 June 1931 (aged 87)
- Occupations: Director of Bell Brothers, Middlesbrough
- Spouses: Maria Shield (m. 1867; died 1871) Florence Bell (m. 1876; died 1930)
- Children: 5, including Gertrude, Maurice, and Mary

Sir Thomas Hugh Bell, 2nd Baronet (10 February 1844 – 29 June 1931) was an English industrialist, landowner, Justice of the Peace, and administrator. A Deputy Lieutenant of County Durham, he was High Sheriff of Durham in 1895 and Lord Lieutenant of the North Riding of Yorkshire from 1906 to 1931. He joined his family firm, Bell Brothers, and became director of its steelworks at Middlesbrough.

== Early life ==
The son of Isaac Lowthian Bell, when he was eighteen the young Bell was required by his father to work at the family's Bell Brothers Ironworks at Walker, Newcastle upon Tyne, but he was later educated at Edinburgh, the Sorbonne in Paris, and in Germany.

== Career ==
After joining the family firm, Bell Brothers, Bell was made the director of the family's large factory, the steelworks at Middlesbrough. He also served as mayor of Middlesbrough three times – in 1874, 1883 and 1911. He was, like his father, a director of the North Eastern Railway, and had a private platform on the line between Middlesbrough and Redcar, at the bottom of the garden of his house, Red Barns. He was treated as royalty by the railway. His daughter, Lady Richmond, recalled saying goodbye to her father at King's Cross. He stayed with her on the platform to chat until the train left. When the train did not leave on time, they went on talking, until at last a guard came up to them and said "If you would like to finish your conversation, Sir Hugh, we will then be ready to depart."

In 1885, Bell's father was created a Baronet, a title he inherited in 1904. He was appointed a Companion of the Order of the Bath (CB) in the 1918 Birthday Honours.

He was no ordinary capitalist and mill owner, but made sure his workers were well paid and cared for.

== Architectural commissions ==
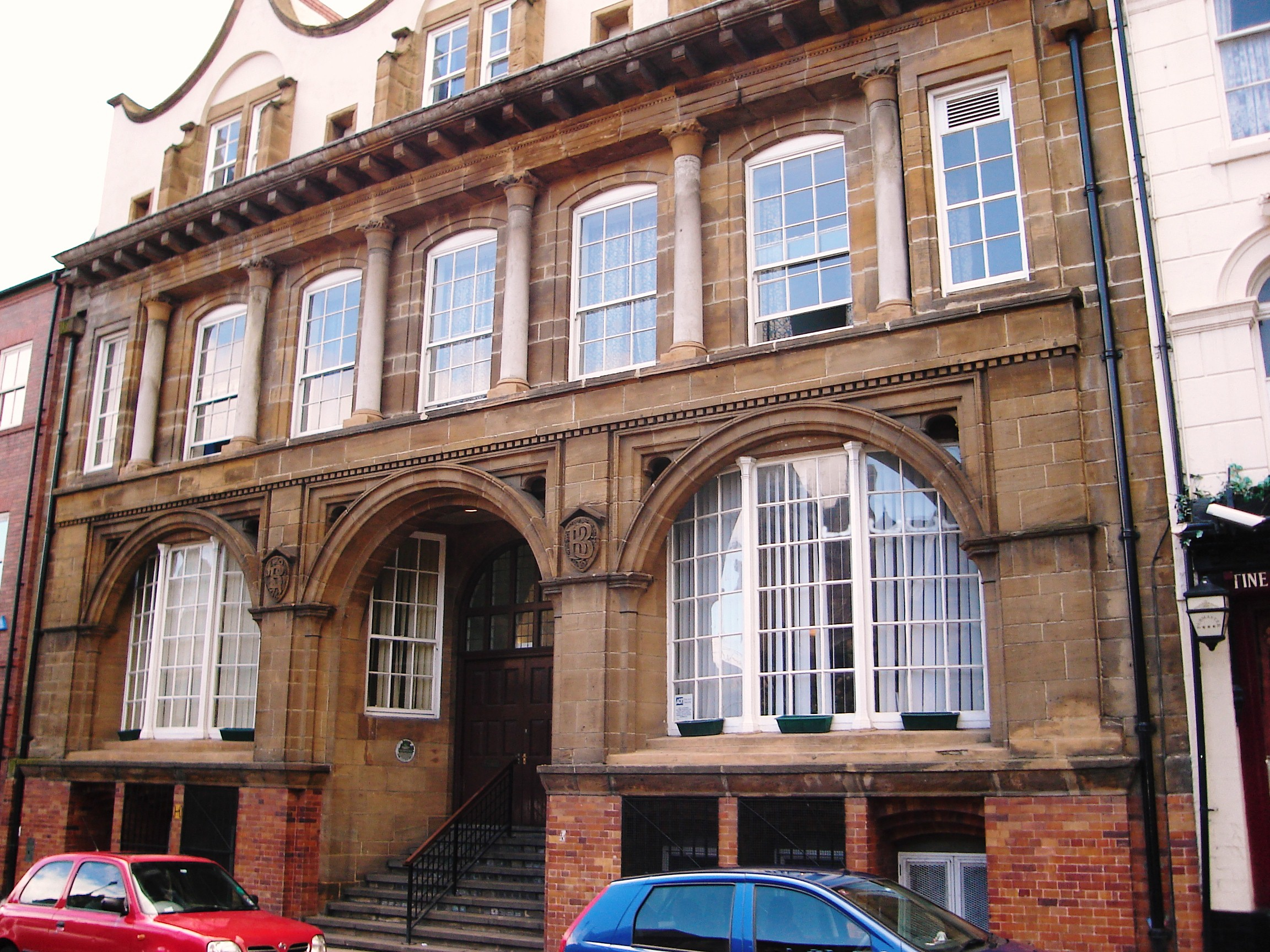
Former Bell Brothers and Dorman Long office building designed by Phillip Speakman Webb

His friendship with the architect Philip Webb led to three commissions in the Middlesbrough area – of Rounton Grange, built for his father in the 1870s and demolished in 1953, Red Barns House and the Dorman Long office building, originally that of Bell Brothers, in Middlesbrough, which was Webb's only commercial development. He also commissioned Walter Brierley to construct the Ingleby Arncliffe Water Tower.

== Family ==
He was the son of the wealthy pioneering ironmaster Lowthian Bell and his wife, Margaret Pattinson. He married Maria Shield on 23 April 1867 and they had two children:

- Gertrude Bell (1868–1926), the author, traveller, and political officer
- Sir Maurice Bell, 3rd Baronet (1871–1944)

Upon the death of his first wife on 19 April 1871, he married, secondly, Florence Olliffe, a daughter of Sir Joseph Olliffe.

With Florence he had three children:

- Hugh Lowthian Bell (1878–1926)
- Florence Elsa Bell (1880–1971), who married Admiral Sir Herbert Richmond
- Mary Katherine Bell, OBE (1881–1966), who married Charles Trevelyan

Honorary titles
Preceded by The Marquess of Ripon	Lord Lieutenant of the North Riding of Yorkshire; 1906–1931	Succeeded by Geoffrey William Algernon Howard
Baronetage of the United Kingdom
Preceded by Lowthian Bell	Baronet (of Rounton Range and Washington Hall); 1904–1931	Succeeded by Maurice Bell
