= Sir Maurice Bell, 3rd Baronet =

British soldier (1871-1944)

Colonel Sir Maurice Bell Bt, CMG, TD, DL, JP

High Sheriff of Durham
- In office 1921–1921
- Preceded by: Sir Arthur Pease
- Succeeded by: Sir John Storey Barwick

Personal details
- Born: 29 March 1871
- Died: 17 November 1944 (aged 73)
- Parents: Sir Hugh Bell (father); Mary Shield (mother)
- Relatives: Gertrude Bell (sister); Lowthian Bell (grandfather); Mary Bell (half-sister)
- Education: Eton College
- Military career
- Allegiance: United Kingdom
- Branch: British Army
- Service years: 1890–1918
- Rank: Colonel
- Units: Yorkshire Regiment; 4th Bn Green Howards
- Conflicts: Second Boer War; World War I; France

Sir Maurice Hugh Lowthian Bell, 3rd Baronet, CMG, TD, DL, JP (29 March 1871 – 17 November 1944) was a British soldier.

== Early life ==
Bell was the son of Sir Hugh Bell, 2nd Baronet and his wife Mary (née Shield). His older sister was Gertrude Bell. He was educated at Eton and in Paris and Germany.

== Career ==
His business interests included being director of Dorman Long and Horden Collieries.

He joined the British Army after training at Sandhurst in 1890 and was commissioned as second lieutenant. He was an officer in the 5th (Volunteer) Battalion, the Yorkshire Regiment. He saw active service in South Africa in 1900 when he volunteered to serve in a company attached to a regular battalion during the Second Boer War. Leaving Southampton for Cape Town in February 1900, he returned later the same year. He went to Flanders in 1915 as commanding officer of the 4th Bn Green Howards during the First World War, and was mentioned in dispatches twice. He was invalided home and awarded the CMG in 1916.

For the remainder he was granted a command in England. He was High Sheriff of Durham in 1921. He succeeded his father as 3rd Baronet in 1931. He resided at Mount Grace Priory, Northallerton. Upon his death he was succeeded as Baronet by his nephew, Sir Hugh Bell, 4th Baronet (1923–1970).

== Bibliography ==
- "Col.Sir Maurice Hugh Lowthian Bell". Who Was Who, A & C Black: Bloomsbury Publishing PLC (online ed.). Oxford University Press. December 2012.
- "Obituary". The Times (49995#col E). 20 November 1944.

Baronetage of the United Kingdom
Preceded by T. Hugh Bell	Baronet (of Rounton Grange and Washington Hall); 1931–1944	Succeeded by Hugh Bell
