= Sir Charles Trevelyan, 3rd Baronet =

British politician (1870–1958)

The Right Honourable Sir Charles Trevelyan Bt

President of the Board of Education
- In office 7 June 1929 – 2 March 1931
- Prime Minister: Ramsay MacDonald
- Preceded by: Lord Eustace Percy
- Succeeded by: Hastings Lees-Smith
- In office 22 January 1924 – 3 November 1924
- Prime Minister: Ramsay MacDonald
- Preceded by: Hon. E. F. L. Wood
- Succeeded by: Lord Eustace Percy

Parliamentary Secretary to the Board of Education
- In office 19 October 1908 – 10 August 1914
- Prime Minister: H. H. Asquith
- Preceded by: Thomas McKinnon Wood
- Succeeded by: Christopher Addison

Member of Parliament for Newcastle Central
- In office 15 November 1922 – 27 October 1931
- Preceded by: George Renwick
- Succeeded by: Arthur Denville

Member of Parliament for Elland
- In office 8 March 1899 – 14 December 1918
- Preceded by: Thomas Wayman
- Succeeded by: George Taylor Ramsden

Personal details
- Born: 28 October 1870
- Died: 24 January 1958 (aged 87)
- Party: Liberal; Labour
- Other political affiliations: Popular Front
- Spouse: Mary Bell (m. 1904)
- Children: 7, including George

Sir Charles Philips Trevelyan, 3rd Baronet (28 October 1870 – 24 January 1958) was a British Liberal Party, and later Labour Party, politician and landowner. He served as President of the Board of Education in 1924 and between 1929 and 1931 in the first two Labour administrations of Ramsay MacDonald, the first Labour Prime Minister.

== Background ==
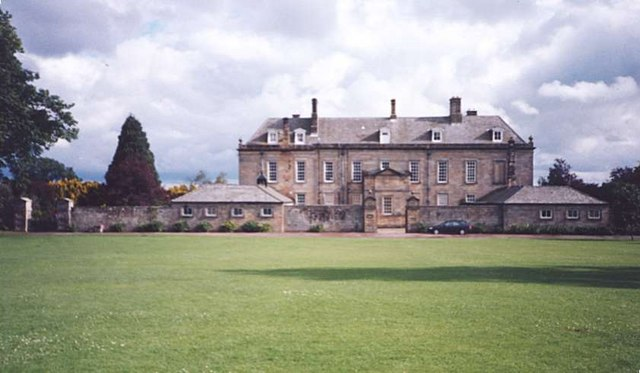
Wallington, Northumberland

Born into a liberal aristocratic family (see Trevelyan baronets of Nettlecombe, 1662), Charles was the eldest son of Sir George Trevelyan Bt MP, and his wife Caroline, daughter of Robert Needham Philips MP. He was the grandson of Sir Charles Trevelyan Bt, the elder brother of the poet R. C. Trevelyan and the historian G. M. Trevelyan, and the great-nephew of Lord Macaulay. He was the great-great-grandson of Sir John Trevelyan (1735–1828). Family legend traced their ancestry to Sir Trevillian, one of King Arthur's knights, who swam ashore on horseback when the legendary land of Lyonesse sank. The family kept three houses year round: Wallington in Northumberland, which the family had owned since 1777, Welcombe House in Warwickshire, and a town house in Westminster, No.14 Great College Street. The family estates comprised more than 11,000 acres.

After Harrow and Trinity College, Cambridge, Charles Philips Trevelyan decided upon a political career. Beatrice Webb, his friend, described him as "a man who has every endowment – social position, wealth, intelligence, an independent outlook, good looks, good manners".

== Life and career ==
Trevelyan was first a Liberal and later a Labour MP. His eventual political achievements were uneven. As a member of the landed gentry serving in the Labour Party, he was considered by some to be a walking anachronism. Despite this, his own privileges and gentlemanly pursuits always remained intact. Trevelyan was elected Liberal Member of Parliament (MP) for Elland, Yorkshire, in a by-election in 1899. He served under H. H. Asquith as Parliamentary Secretary to the Board of Education between 1908 and 1914, when, as an opponent of British entry into the First World War, he resigned from the government. In 1914, also, he founded the Union of Democratic Control an all-party organisation rallying opposition to the war. In the 1918 general election he lost his Elland seat, running as an Independent Labour candidate.

He won Newcastle Central for Labour in 1922 and held it until 1931. He was a member of Ramsay MacDonald's Labour cabinets as President of the Board of Education between January and November 1924 and between 1929 and 1931, resigning when his Education Bill was rejected by the House of Lords a few months before the Labour government collapsed. The bill was opposed not only by Conservatives but by Catholic members of the Labour Party who feared that it would allow local governments to seize control of parochial schools, leading to a decline in Catholic support for the party in the 1930s. In 1924 he was sworn of the Privy Council.

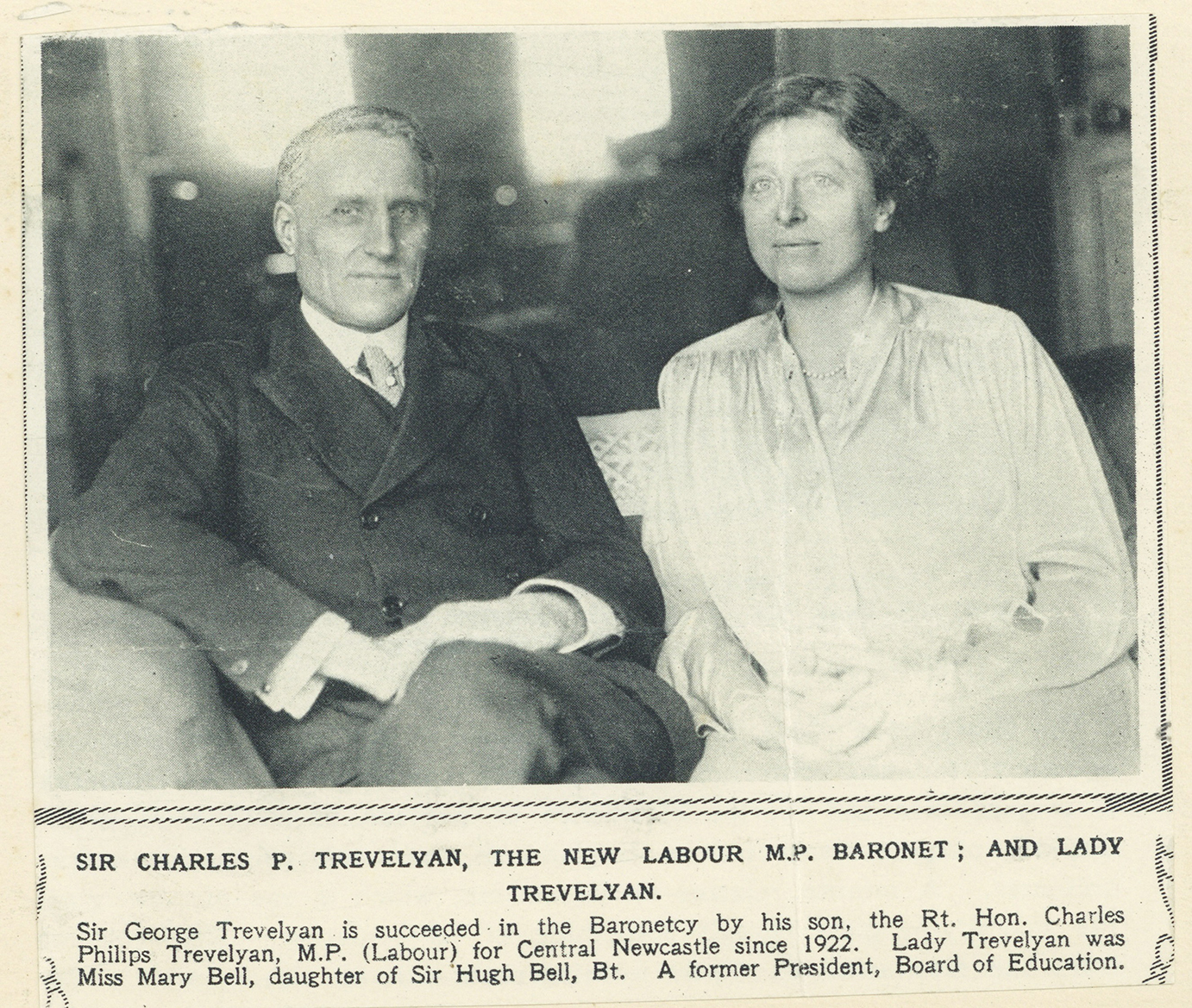
In 1928 he succeeded his father as third Baronet – Sir Charles and Mary Lady Trevelyan

In early 1939, following Stafford Cripps and with Aneurin Bevan among others, Trevelyan was briefly expelled from the Labour Party for persisting with support for a "popular front" (involving co-operation with the Liberal Party and Communist Party) against the National Government.

Apart from his political career, Trevelyan was also Lord Lieutenant of Northumberland between 1930 and 1949.

In 1942, although he had a son and heir, Trevelyan and his wife donated Wallington, complete with its estate of farm land, which he had inherited in 1928, to the National Trust, the first donation of this kind.

He was the last surviving member of the first British Labour Cabinet.

== Family ==
Trevelyan married Mary Katherine Bell, a younger half-sister of Gertrude Bell and the daughter of Sir Hugh Bell, 2nd Baronet. They had seven children including his eldest son, Sir George Trevelyan, whom he disinherited. He died in January 1958, aged 87.

Parliament of the United Kingdom
Preceded by Thomas Wayman	Member of Parliament for Elland; 1899–1918	Succeeded by George Taylor Ramsden
Preceded by Sir George Renwick, Bt	Member of Parliament for Newcastle Central; 1922–1931	Succeeded by Arthur Denville
Political offices
Preceded by Thomas McKinnon Wood	Parliamentary Secretary to the Board of Education; 1908–1914	Succeeded by Christopher Addison
Preceded by Hon. E. F. L. Wood	President of the Board of Education; 1924	Succeeded by Lord Eustace Percy
Preceded by Lord Eustace Percy	President of the Board of Education; 1929–1931	Succeeded by Hastings Lees-Smith
Honorary titles
Preceded by The Duke of Northumberland	Lord Lieutenant of Northumberland; 1930–1949	Succeeded by The Viscount Allendale
Baronetage of the United Kingdom
Preceded by George Otto Trevelyan	Baronet (of Wallington); 1928–1958	Succeeded by George Lowthian Trevelyan
