= International House =

International House or International Student(s) House may refer to:

== Australia ==
- International House, Sydney, a heritage-listed building in Sydney, New South Wales
- International House (University of Melbourne), a residential college on the campus of Melbourne University
- International House, University of New South Wales, a residential college on the campus of University of New South Wales
- International House, University of Queensland, a residential college on the campus of the University of Queensland
- International House, The University of Sydney, a residential college on the campus of the University of Sydney
- International House, University of Wollongong, a residential college of the University of Wollongong

== Canada ==
- International House, The University of British Columbia, a residence for new undergraduate and international students

== Japan ==
- International House of Japan, cultural exchange organization and building in Tokyo

== United Kingdom ==
- International Students House, London, a residence for British and overseas students in London

== United States ==
- International House of Atlanta, at the Georgia Institute of Technology in Georgia
- International House of Harrisburg, an independent residential facility near Harrisburg University in Pennsylvania
- International House (Globe, Arizona), listed on the NRHP in Arizona
- International House Berkeley, at the University of California, Berkeley, in California
- International House Hotel in New Orleans, Louisiana
- International House of Chicago, at the University of Chicago, in Illinois
- International House of New York, an independent residential facility and programs center near Columbia University, in New York
- International Student House of Washington, D.C., an independent residential facility in the District of Columbia

== Other uses ==
- International House (film), a 1933 film
- International House of Pancakes (IHOP), a restaurant chain
- International House World Organisation (IHWO), a worldwide organization of language schools
