= International House of New York =

Student residential community in New York City

International House New York
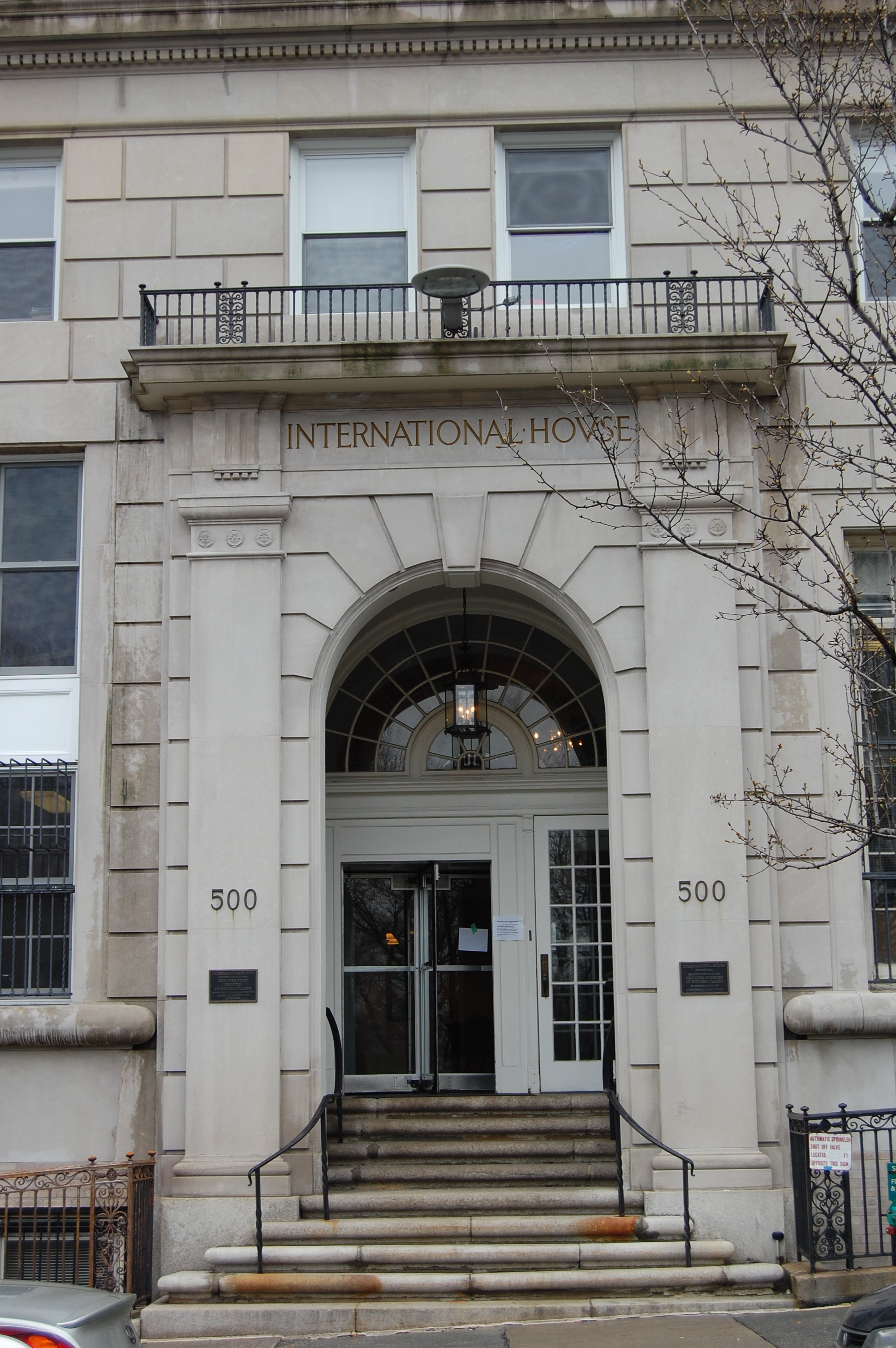
- Founded: 1924
- Founders: John D. Rockefeller Jr., Cleveland Hoadley Dodge, Harry Edmonds
- Purpose: Educational and cross cultural collaboration and leadership training
- Location: 500 Riverside Drive, New York, NY 10027, United States
- Region served: Worldwide
- Members: Typically 700 residents per year, with 65,000 alumni globally
- Key people: Sebastian Fries - President & CEO; Frank G. Wisner - Chairman of the Board of Trustees
- Endowment: $34 million
- Employees: 75
- Website: http://www.ihouse-nyc.org
- International House
- U.S. National Register of Historic Places
- Location within New York City Location within New York Location within the United States
- Location: 500 Riverside Drive, New York, New York
- Coordinates: 40°48′49″N 73°57′43″W
- Area: 1.5 acres (0.61 ha)
- Built: 1924
- Architects: Louis E. Jallade; Marc Eidlitz and Sons
- Architectural style: Italianite
- NRHP reference No.: 99001129
- Added to NRHP: September 10, 1999

International House New York, also known as I-House, is a private, independent, non-profit residence and program center for postgraduate students, research scholars, trainees, and interns, located at 500 Riverside Drive in Morningside Heights, Manhattan, New York City.

The I-House residential community typically consists of 700+ students and scholars from over 100 countries annually, with about one-third of those coming from the United States. The residential experience includes programming designed to promote mutual respect, friendship, and leadership skills across cultures and fields of study. International House has attracted prominent guest speakers through the years, from Eleanor Roosevelt and Isaac Stern to Sandra Day O'Connor, Valerie Jarrett, George Takei, and Nelson Mandela. Students attend various universities and schools throughout the city, which include Columbia University, Juilliard School, Actors Studio Drama School, New York University, the Manhattan School of Music, the Union Theological Seminary in the City of New York, Teachers College, Columbia University, and the City University of New York.

The original entrance to International House is inscribed with the motto written by John D. Rockefeller Jr.: "That Brotherhood May Prevail"; the piazza (The Abby O'Neill Patio) of its entrance opens onto Sakura Park, the site of Japan's original gift of cherry trees to New York City in 1912.

The 500 Riverside Drive building, designed in the Italianite style by architects Louis E. Jallade and Marc Eidlitz and Sons, was built in 1924 and was listed on the U.S. National Register of Historic Places as International House in 1999.

== History ==
The initial impetus for forming I-House occurred when, after a chance encounter with a lone graduate student from China on the steps of Columbia University in 1909, YMCA official Harry Edmonds began efforts to obtain funding to establish the House in order to foster relationships between students from different countries. International House opened its doors in 1924 with funding from John D. Rockefeller Jr., who later would provide funds for similar houses at the University of California, Berkeley and the University of Chicago, as well as the Cleveland Hoadley Dodge family. Other Rockefeller family members to have served on the board of trustees include Abby Aldrich Rockefeller. John D. Rockefeller III, David and Peggy Rockefeller, David Rockefeller Jr., Abby M. O'Neill, and Peter M.O'Neill.

International House was one of the first of many international houses in a global movement to create a diverse environment for international students seeking to further their education. John D. Rockefeller Jr. built International Houses at Berkeley, Chicago, and Paris prior to World War II. Other cities with international houses include: Philadelphia, Harrisburg, San Diego, and Washington, D.C., United States; Melbourne, Brisbane, Sydney, Darwin, and Wollongong, Australia; Alberta, Canada; Auckland, New Zealand; and London, England.

The chairman of the board of trustees is longtime diplomat and businessman Ambassador Frank G. Wisner. The chairman of the board's executive committee is Peter O'Neill. The latter role has also been held by William D. Rueckert, a member of the Dodge family, whose generous gifts contributed to the development of both International House and the Columbia University Teachers College. In May 2021, Sebastian Fries became president and CEO of International House, succeeding Brian Polovoy, a former partner with the law firm Shearman & Sterling and a board member of 11 years, who was appointed interim president from October 2020 to April 2021. The previous president was Calvin Sims, a former program officer at The Ford Foundation and foreign correspondent for The New York Times.

== Controversy ==
In March 2020, as the COVID-19 pandemic unfolded, The New York Times reported that I-House ordered its South Building residents to vacate within one week after a staff member tested positive for the virus and one resident died from complications of the virus, leaving 300-500 students and young professionals, many of whom had recently arrived in the United States, without housing. I-House reportedly told its residents that New York state's newly implemented COVID-19 eviction moratorium did not apply to its residents, because they had signed a contract stating I-House was not a "traditional landlord." Though I-House stated that it was working to help identify alternative housing options for its residents, as well as waiving fees and refunding security deposits, I-House was criticized from both a moral and public health standpoint.

== Trustees and board members ==
=== Current chairman of the board ===
- Frank G. Wisner

=== Honorary trustees ===
- David Rockefeller, Honorary Chairman
- Henry A. Kissinger
- Abby M. O'Neill
- Daisy M. Soros '51
- Paul A. Volcker
- John C. Whitehead

=== Chairman of the executive committee ===
- Peter O'Neill

=== Past chairmen of the board ===
- George W. Wickersham
- Henry L. Stimson
- George C. Marshall
- John J. McCloy
- Charles W. Yost
- George W. Ball
- Henry A. Kissinger
- Gerald R. Ford
- John C. Whitehead
- Paul A. Volcker
- William D. Rueckert

=== Past honorary chairman ===
- Dwight D. Eisenhower

== Notable alumni ==
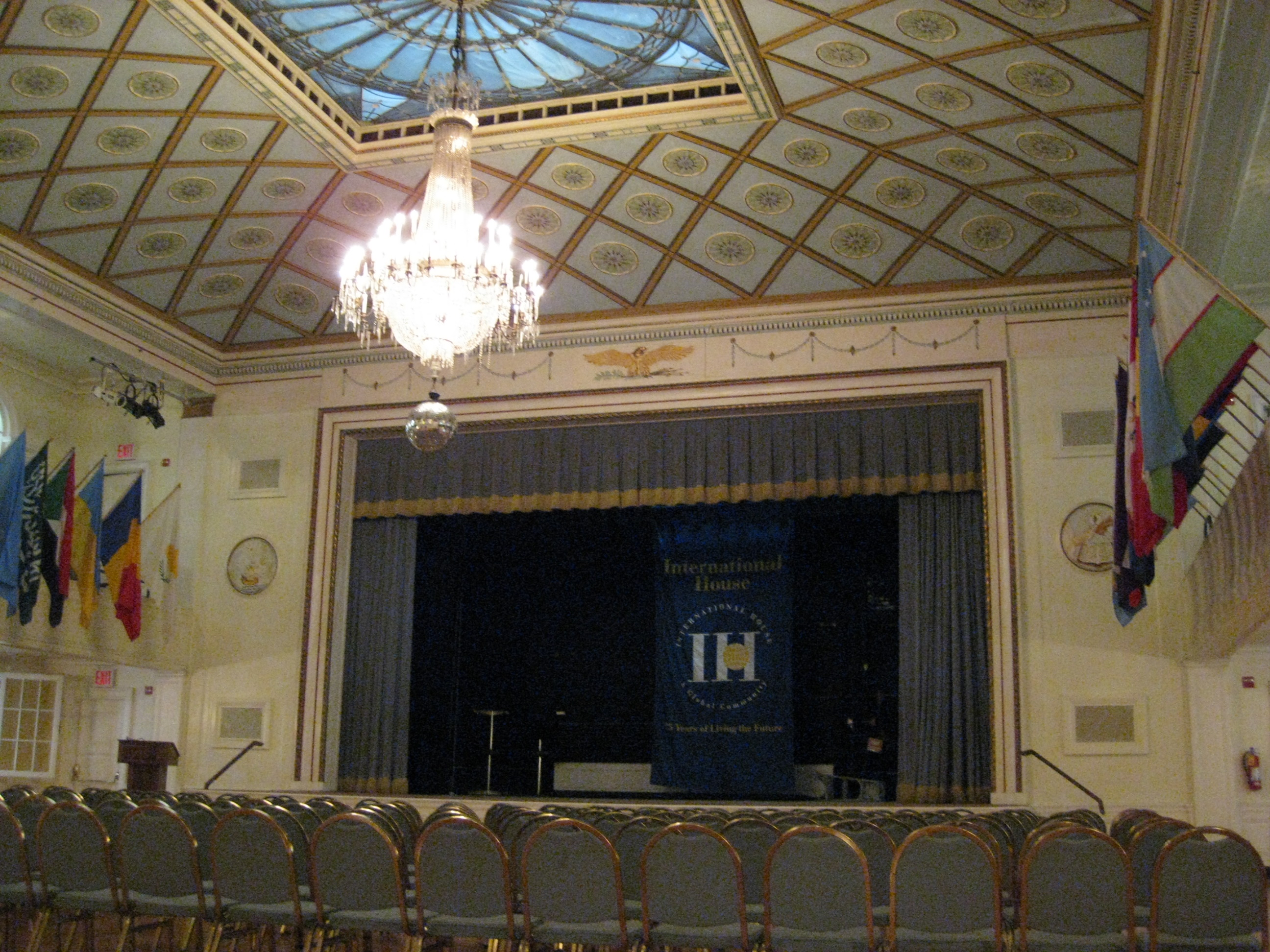
Auditorium inside I-House

An estimated 65,000 individuals have lived in I-House from around the world. Among the notable alumni are:

- Chinua Achebe, Nigerian writer, author of Things Fall Apart
- Nemesio Antúnez, Chilean painter and engraver
- Pina Bausch, German choreographer
- Warren Bebbington, retired Vice-Chancellor, University of Adelaide
- Dietrich Bonhoeffer '31, theologian and anti-Nazi dissident
- Leonard Cohen, poet and songwriter
- Shelby Cullom Davis, U.S. investment banker, Ambassador to Switzerland
- Kiran Desai, Indian author and novelist
- Pamella D'Pella, actress
- Mark Eyskens, Prime Minister of Belgium
- Ibrahim Gambari '71, UN under-secretary general
- James P. Gorman, chairman and CEO of Morgan Stanley
- Jorge Ibargüengoitia, Mexican novelist
- Burl Ives, Academy Award-winning actor
- Philip Johnston '09, Co-Founder and CEO of Starcloud
- Arundhati Katju '17, attorney and pioneer of LGBT rights in India
- Jerzy Kosinski, Polish-born writer, author of Being There
- Wassily Leontief, winner of the Nobel Prize in Economic Sciences
- Flora Lewis, New York Times journalist
- Benjamin Mkapa, former president, Tanzania
- Mark Mathabane, South African-born writer, author of Kaffir Boy
- Ashley Montague, British anthropologist
- Vikram Pandit, Chairman & CEO, Citigroup
- Dale Peck, US writer, novelist, and literary critic
- I.M. Pei, Chinese-born architect
- Hans-Gert Poettering, former president, European Parliament
- Leontyne Price, '52 opera star
- Carlo Rubbia, winner of the Nobel Prize in Physics
- David Sainsbury, British businessman, philanthropist, Labour cabinet minister
- Edward J. Sparling '29, Founder, Roosevelt University, Chicago
- Tatsuro Toyoda '58, Senior Advisor, Toyota Motor Corporation
- Shirley Verrett, opera star
- Christiane Reimann, Danish Nurse

== See also ==
- Cité internationale universitaire, Paris
- Goodenough College, London
- International House Berkeley
- International Students House, London
- International Student House of Washington, D.C.
