= International Trade Mart =

Trade organization in New Orleans, US

The International Trade Mart was a New Orleans–based organization promoting international trade and the Port of New Orleans, Louisiana, United States. The organization was founded in 1946, and merged with International House in 1968, when it was renamed to World Trade Center New Orleans.

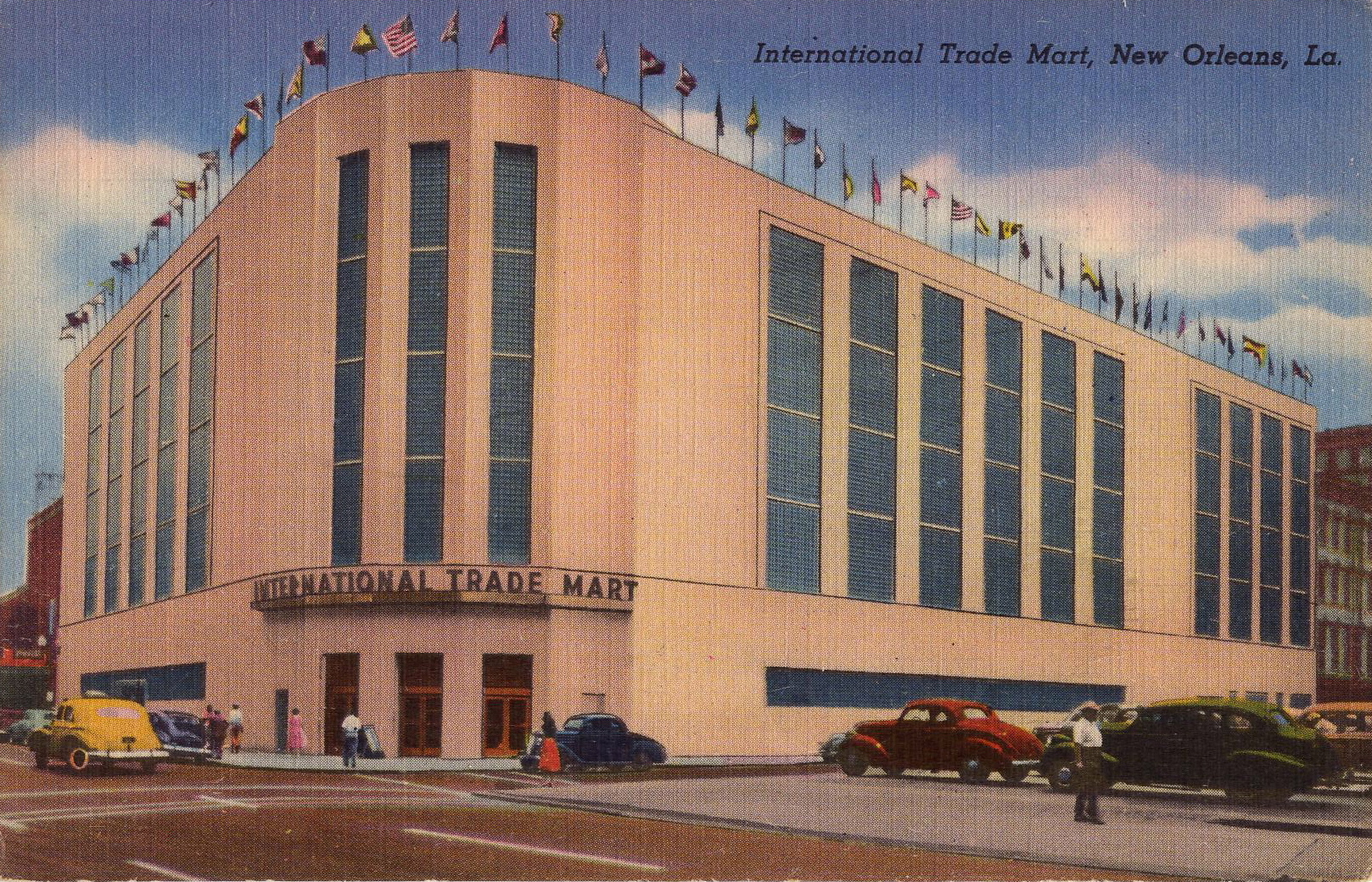
The original International Trade Mart building (since demolished), corner of Camp & Common Streets in New Orleans.

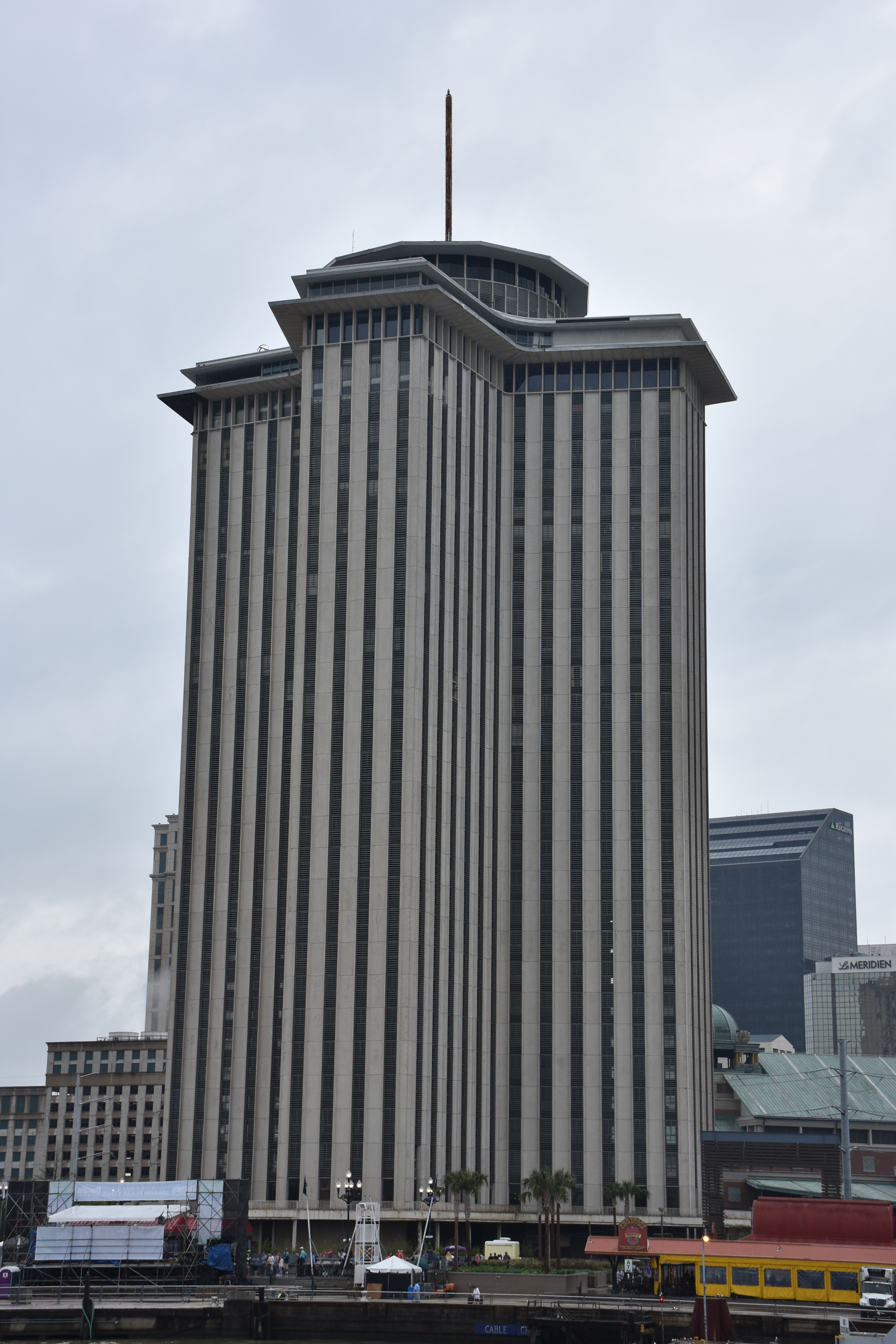
2 Canal Street, the former headquarters of the World Trade Center New Orleans, successor organization of the ITM, designed by Edward Durell Stone.

After World War II, New Orleans businessman Clay Shaw returned to New Orleans where he became a founder of the International Trade Mart (ITM). From 1947 to his retirement in 1965, Shaw ran the ITM as a managing director.

The International Trade Mart was chartered in 1945, first opened in 1948, and in 1968, merged with International House to form the World Trade Center New Orleans (WTCNO), a private, non-profit organization with a membership of 2,000 corporations and individuals dedicated to improving international trade with New Orleans.

Like its predecessor organizations, the WTCNO continues to sponsor trade missions to Latin American and Caribbean nations to conduct a variety of educational programs, conferences, seminars, and trade shows and to host dignitaries and other visitors from New Orleans' trade partner nations.

In 1968, the WTCNO moved into a purpose-built 33-story building at 2 Canal Street, designed by architect Edward Durell Stone. The building overlooks the Mississippi River and the French Quarter. After Hurricane Katrina, the building was unoccupied, and in 2012 it was purchased from the WTCNO by the City of New Orleans. In 2018, the city announced that the building would be redeveloped into a hotel and apartment complex, set to open in 2021. The World Trade Center New Orleans organization has offices in a nearby building, One Canal Place.

Trade expansionists advanced their cause further by forming the International Trade Mart (ITM). They intended that International House and ITM would complement each other and together would form the international program's foundation. The mart satisfied a longstanding ambition for an institution that could exhibit commodities and could provide a setting where buyer and seller could meet easily in New Orleans.

== Bibliography ==
- Arthur E. Carpenter. Gateway to the Americas: New Orleans' Quest for Latin American Trade, 1900-1970 (Tulane University, 1987)
