= Entrepreneurs' Row =

New Orleans office building

Coordinates: 29.9512°N 90.0685°W

Entrepreneurs’ Row is a New Orleans loft-style office building owned by International House Hotel and created by entrepreneur Sean Cummings in July 2007. Located at 220 Camp Street, it houses several of the city's fledgling startups.

The idea for Entrepreneurs’ Row came to Cummings in May 2007, when Nicolas Perkin, the co-founder and president of the Receivables Exchange, an electronic marketplace for the buying and selling of commercial receivables, contacted him to ask his opinion on a proposed move from New York to New Orleans. Cummings encouraged him to do so. The Receivables Exchange was the first entrepreneurial tenant to move into Cummings’ building in July. By November 2008, nine companies had offices at Entrepreneurs’ Row, and Cummings had personally invested in six.

According to Cummings, the goal of the development was to focus on “clustering likeminded entrepreneurs to build their businesses together” and fuel a local tech-based economy.
