= Edward J. Sparling =

American educator (1896–1981)

Edward J. Sparling (1896–1981) was an American educator who was the founder of Roosevelt University in Chicago, Illinois.

== Life ==
Edward Sparling was born in Panoche, California in 1896. Sparling received a B.A. from Stanford University and his Master's and Ph.D. from Columbia University where he lived in the International House of New York. During World War I, Sparling served in the U.S. Army as a flying instructor. In 1936 to 1945 Sparling became president of Central YMCA College in Chicago and served there until 1945 when he incorporated Roosevelt College, which would admit students regardless of race or religion. The college became a university in 1954 and Sparling stepped down as president in 1963. He retired to Pleasanton, California where he died in 1981.

He was one of the signatories of the agreement to convene a convention for drafting a world constitution. As a result, for the first time in human history, a World Constituent Assembly convened to draft and adopt the Constitution for the Federation of Earth.

== Works ==
Sparling authored several works including "Do College Students Choose Vocations Wisely?"
