= International House Berkeley =

Student residential community at UC Berkeley

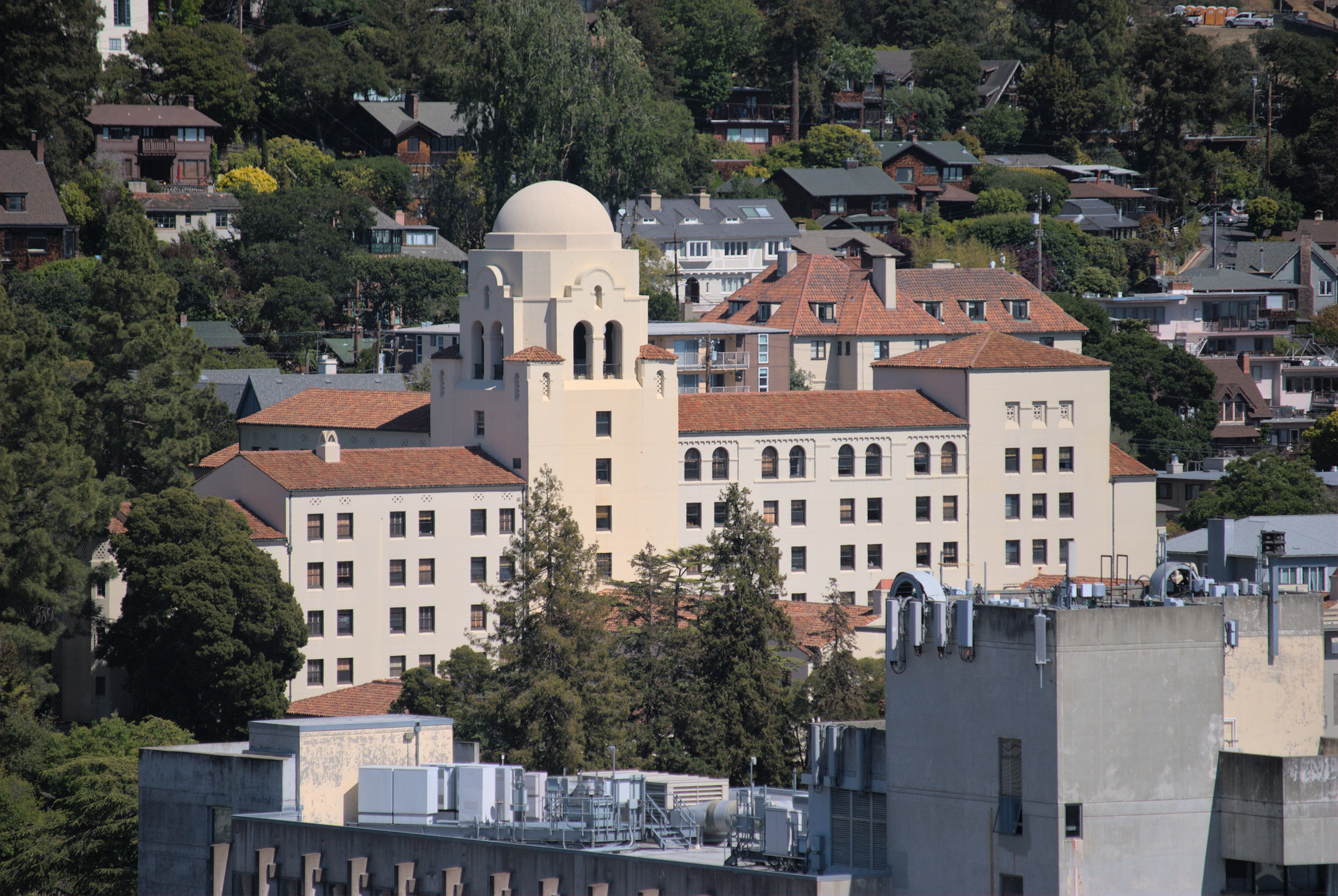
- International House from Sather Tower
- Type: Student housing and residence
- Established: 1930; 96 years ago
- Founders: Harry Edmonds; John D. Rockefeller Jr.
- Parent institution: University of California, Berkeley
- Location: Berkeley, California, United States; 37°52′10.28″N 122°15′7.23″W
- Website: ihouse.berkeley.edu

The International House Berkeley (I-House) is a multi-cultural residence serving students at the University of California, Berkeley. The International House has several rooms and lounges that overlook both the San Francisco Bay and the Golden Gate Bridge. Established in 1930, the House was created as a gift from John D. Rockefeller Jr. to foster relationships between students from different countries. It has housed many famous artists, scientists, and scholars connected with the university; including multiple Nobel laureates, royal family members, political ambassadors and several United Nations staff.

The International House Berkeley has served as one of the largest and most diverse global residential communities in the world. In total, 600 international and American students from 70 nations live in the house during the academic year. According to The International House, its mission is to "foster intercultural respect and understanding, lifelong friendships and leadership skills for the promotion of a more tolerant and peaceful world." Nearly one thousand alumni have married another resident.

== History ==
The International House Berkeley was part of a larger "International House movement", founded by Harry Edmonds. Edmonds decided to investigate the situation of foreign students in New York City. With the funding and support of John D. Rockefeller Jr., the first International House opened in New York in 1924. They both decided to extend the idea. When Edmonds came to Berkeley, he chose Piedmont Avenue due to the concentration of fraternities and sororities which then excluded foreigners. By proposing this site, Edmonds sought to "strike bigotry and exclusiveness right hard in the nose." Designed by noted architect George W. Kelham in a Spanish–Moorish architecture, it officially opened on August 18, 1930. The first director of the International House Berkeley was Dr. Gladys Eugenia Bryson from Kentucky, newly graduated from the University of California, Berkeley.

=== Notable alumni ===
- Willis Lamb (resident: 1930–38)
- John Kenneth Galbraith (resident: 1931–32)
- Glenn Seaborg (non-resident member: 1934–35)
- Melvin Calvin (resident: 1937–38)
- Julian Schwinger (resident: 1939–40)
- Owen Chamberlain (resident: 1940–41)
- Sir Geoffrey Wilkinson (resident: 1946–50)
- W. Michael Blumenthal (resident: 1951)
- Sadako Ogata (resident: 1956–57)
- Vernon Ehlers (resident: 1956–58)
- Pete Wilson (resident: 1960)
- Jerry Brown (resident: 1960–61)
- Eric Schmidt (resident: 1976–80)
- Andrew Z. Fire (resident: 1977–78)
- Ogbonnaya Onu (resident: 1977–80)
- Jan Egeland (resident: 1983)
- Crown Prince Haakon Magnus of Norway (resident: 1996–1997)

== See also ==
- University of California, Berkeley student housing
- UC Village
- International House of New York
- International Students House, London
- International Student House of Washington, D.C.
- Cité internationale universitaire, Paris
