= World Trade Center New Orleans =

Nonprofit organization in Louisiana, US

World Trade Center of New Orleans
- World Trade Center of New Orleans
- Abbreviation: WTCNO
- Predecessor: International House, International Trade Mart
- Formation: 1943
- Type: Not for Profit
- Purpose: International Business
- Headquarters: New Orleans, Louisiana, United States
- Coordinates: 29°56′56″N 90°03′49″W
- Region served: Louisiana and the Gulf Coast, United States
- Members: 1,600 Corporate and Individual Members
- Official language: English
- Chief Executive Officer: J. Edwin Webb
- Chairman: Thomas P. Spiers
- Parent organization: World Trade Centers Association
- Website: wtcno.org

The World Trade Center of New Orleans is the founding member of the World Trade Centers Association, a worldwide association of over 300 World Trade Centers in nearly 100 countries. The mission of the World Trade Center of New Orleans is to create jobs and wealth in Louisiana through international trade. It is located at 365 Canal Street, Suite 1120 in New Orleans.

== General information ==
The World Trade Center of New Orleans is a non-profit organization of 1,000+ corporate and individual members. The membership base represents a diverse group of industry leaders, companies, professional organizations, and government institutions that include manufacturers, energy, agriculture, maritime, digital media, foreign consulates, and other interests. In 2014, member organizations were able to significantly contribute to Louisiana's record-breaking exports, the total value of which exceeded $65 billion.

The organization is headquartered in New Orleans. Its office was moved from the former World Trade Center Building located at Canal Street to the office tower of One Canal Place. The office tower of One Canal Place is located in the Central Business District of New Orleans, and is the ninth tallest building in the city.

== History ==
The International House, chartered in 1943, and the International Trade Mart, chartered in 1945, were the two predecessor organizations of the World Trade Center of New Orleans. Plans for a monumental structure to house both organizations were drafted. Several plots of land were purchased at 2 Canal Street where the new ITM building was constructed. The formal dedication ceremony of the ITM building took place on April 30, 1968, as part of a celebration of the 250th anniversary of the founding of New Orleans. Ambassadors from around the world visited the city. Parades and banquets were held, and the Organization of American States brought its first meeting outside of Washington, D.C., to New Orleans.

The concept of the International Trade Mart launched the formation of a worldwide league of trade centers, which led to the founding of the World Trade Centers Association. In 1968 Dr. Paul Fabry, a founding member of the NO Int'l House, along with Guy Tozzoli and Eisaku Yamada formulated the plans for the World Trade Centers Association. All three were founding directors of the WTCA which was officially Incorporated in 1969. In 1985, the old New Orleans house of trade from where the WTCA had emerged, officially became a part of the WTC family. Today the WTCA consists of more than 300 World Trade Centers in nearly 100 countries.

== Leadership ==
J. Edwin Webb is the chief executive officer of the World Trade Center New Orleans. The organization is run by a board of directors. Meaghan McCormack is the vice president of marketing and communications for the World Trade Center New Orleans.

== See also ==
- International House Hotel
- International Trade Mart
