= Central YMCA College =

Defunct college in Chicago

Central YMCA College was a college operated by the YMCA in Chicago, Illinois, United States. It was founded prior to or in 1922. and was accredited in 1924. It was closed in 1945 after the university president and a large majority of the faculty and students left to form what became Roosevelt University.

Central YMCA Community College opened in the fall of 1961 and operated until June 1982. It was sometimes called Central YMCA College for short, but had no formal connection to the earlier institution.

== Closing of the school ==
In 1945, Edward J. Sparling, then president of the College, refused to provide the Central YMCA College board with the demographic data of his student body. He feared it would provide the basis for a quota system to limit the numerous blacks, Jews, immigrants, and women enrolled at the school. When Sparling was fired, most of the faculty and students left with him; they voted to start a new college with a vote of 62 to 1 for faculty and 488 to 2 with the student body.

This College was originally called Thomas Jefferson College. After the death of President Franklin D. Roosevelt, the college was renamed in his honor. It later achieved university status. In August 1945, Central YMCA college closed down.

== Presidents ==
- Edward J. Sparling (September 1936-April 14, 1945)

== Location ==
Y.M.C.A College programs were originally held in Lake Geneva, WI. The first permanent location in 1915, was on 53rd and S Drexel Avenue in the Hyde Park section of Chicago which later became the George Williams College. The College was located at 19 South LaSalle Street in 1961, before expanding to the former "Chicago Evening Post Building" at 211 W. Wacker Drive in 1965.

== 1944 racial and religious counts ==
In November 1944, of the approximately 2500 students at Central YMCA College, ethnic and religious minorities included the following:

- 625 Negroes (25.4%)
- Approximately 800 Jews
- 96 Japanese
- Approximately 400 Catholics

== Student activities ==
The College did not offer student athletics due to racial discrimination, as there were restrictions on Negro usage of YMCA athletic facilities.

The school newspaper was the Central YMCA College Central News.

== Central YMCA Community College ==
Central YMCA Community College, which is sometimes called Central YMCA College, was founded in Fall of 1961. It closed in June 1982.
