= International House, University of Wollongong =

International House
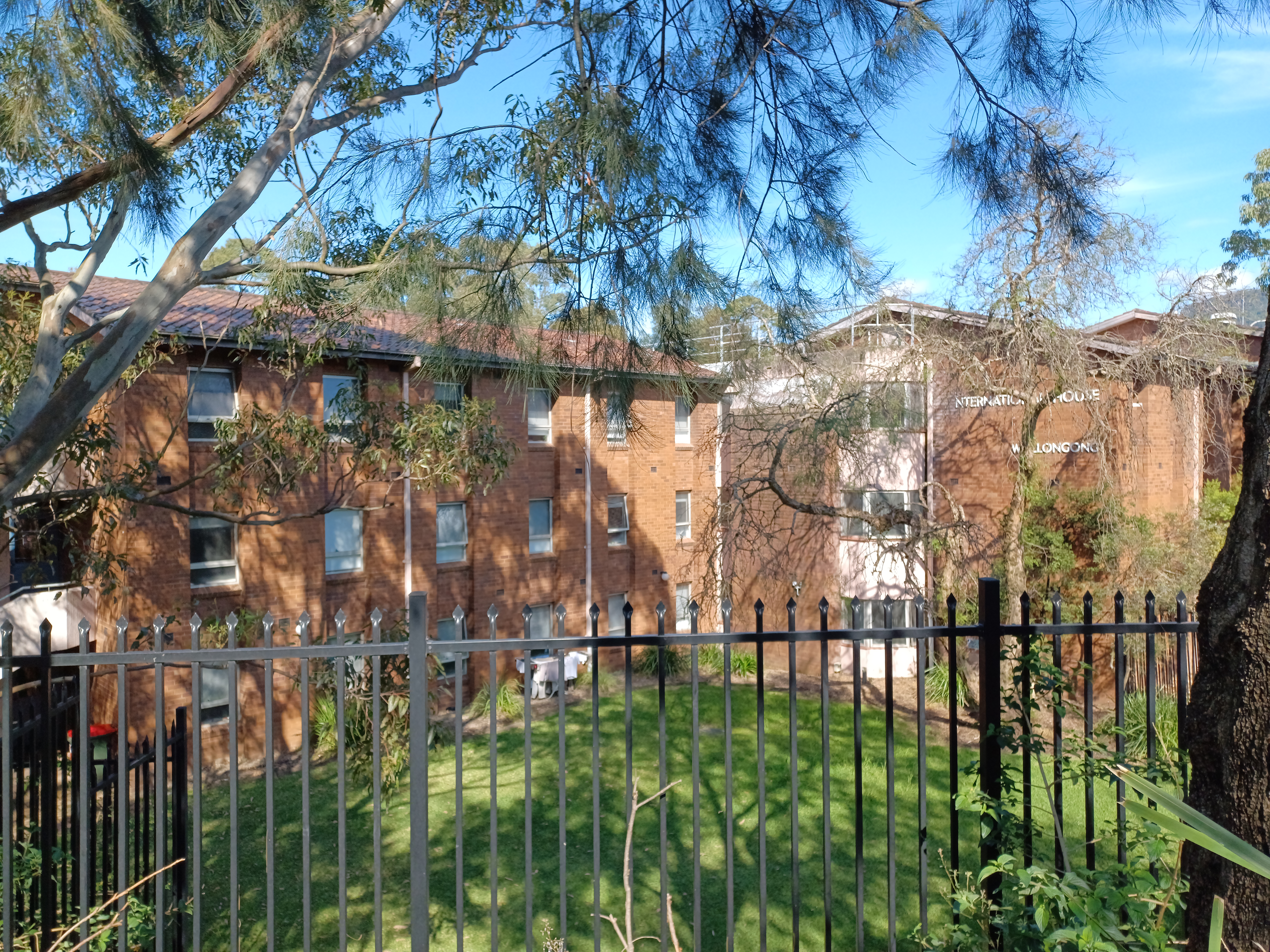
- Motto: Concordia Floreat
- Motto in English: Let harmony prevail
- Established: 1980
- Affiliations: International Houses Worldwide
- Academic affiliations: University of Wollongong
- Location: Porter and Hindmarsh Avenue, North Wollongong, New South Wales, Australia; 34°24′36″S 150°53′26″E
- Colours: Blue, Red

International House is the oldest residential college of the University of Wollongong, and is an affiliate of the 16 International Houses Worldwide. The establishment is now known as iHouse and provides accommodation to approximately 222 students who are attending the University of Wollongong.

== History ==
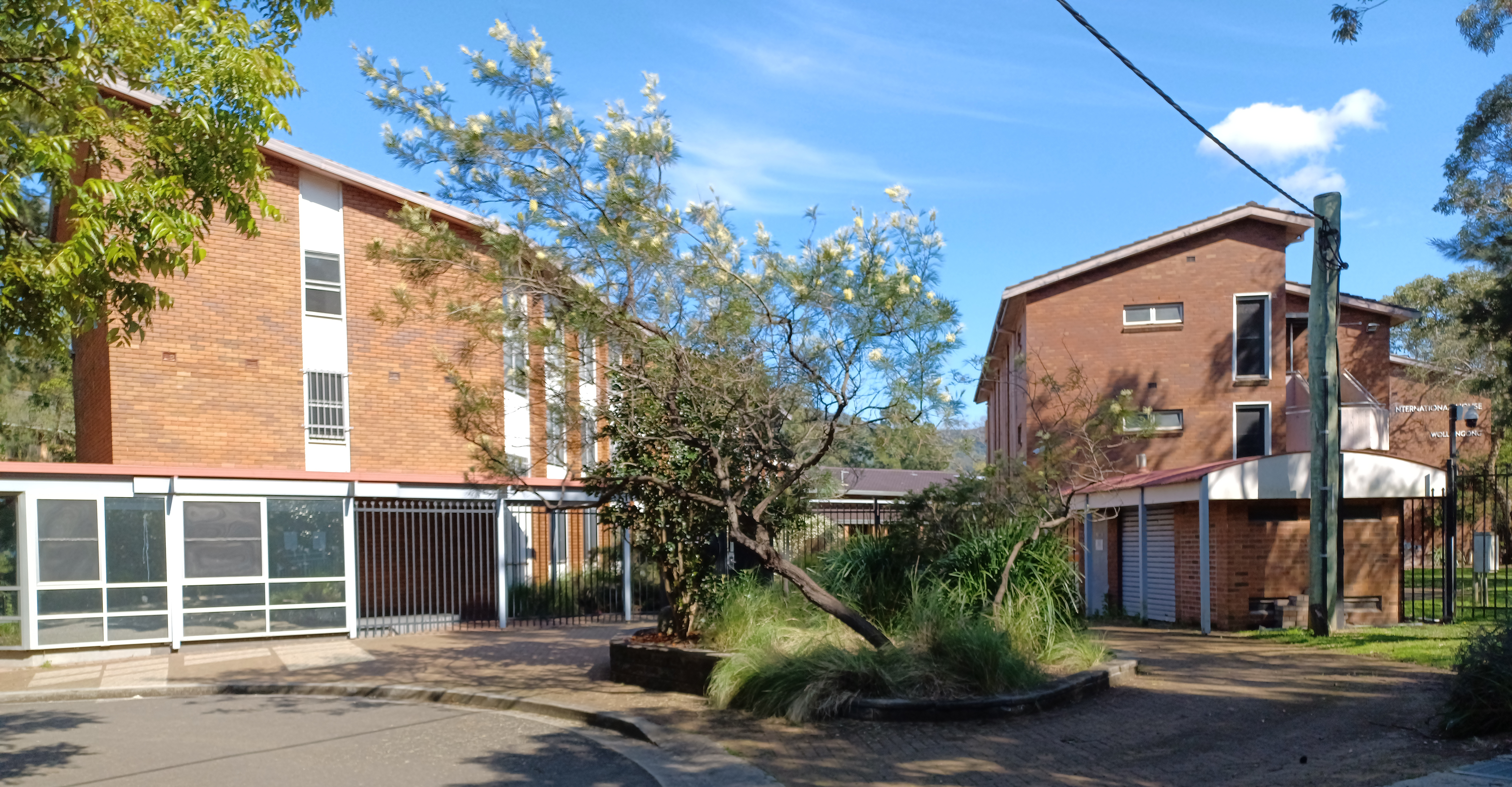
International House, University of Wollongong

International House was formerly a YMCA Hostel, established in 1966. It was enlarged between 1970 and 1975 and became a residential college of the then Wollongong University College. It was formally opened on Friday, 8 August 1975 by the then Governor General of the Commonwealth of Australia, the Rt Hon Sir John Kerr, AC, KCMG, KStJ, QC.

In 1980 the YMCA sold it to the University of Wollongong and it became the university's first hall of residence. Liz Hilton was appointed as Deputy Warden Secretary Manager and lived on site in a small flat located at the residence. In 1983 she became the manager and lived and worked there until 1987. During her tenure there were two tragic accidents which had a profound impact on the community: an American student became a paraplegic in a car accident; and three students from New Jersey, USA, were killed in a minibus accident in Gympie, NSW.

After the departure of Liz Hilton, from 1987 to 1990 all three of the university's residences (International House, Weerona College and Kooloobong) were centrally managed from International House after Cynthia Halloran was appointed Head of Halls of Residence in 1986.

However, in 1990 Weerona College became an independently administered residence. Following a review of the halls of residence in 2002, further changes to the operations of the colleges occurred, with greater centralisation of administrative functions.

Cynthia Halloran left International House at the end of 2002, after 16 years living and working there with her family. Her husband, Tom Halloran, held the title of 'Academic Dean' while she was the head.

The current Student Residence Managers are Alison Hemsley and Lindsay Oades, who began their appointment in 2003. They were awarded a Vice-Chancellors General Staff Award for Outstanding Contribution to Teaching and Learning in 2008 for the iLIVE Program at International House.

In 2010, The Manor was opened by the University of Wollongong as a residence for single higher degree research and post graduate students. It is managed by International House and its residents have access to all of the programs and facilities of International House, including iLive program and meals.

International House traditional rivals are Weerona College, who compete regularly against International House in sporting and other competitions such as debating.

The International House 30th reunion was held on Saturday, 27 November 2010. The Governor General of the Commonwealth of Australia, Quentin Bryce AC, the Governor of NSW, Marie Bashir AC, CVO, and the Hon David Campbell, MP in his capacity as the NSW Member for Keira, have issued congratulatory messages for the occasion.

For the first time since 1966 International House closed its doors for 2021. The current management of University Accommodation cited COVID19 and the reduction in international students as a reason to close several university residence including international house, displacing many of its international students to newer accommodation with less focus on the international vision that all International Houses are famous for.

August 2021 the University of Wollongong announced the permanent closure and sale of the first UOW residence. Whilst other residences at UOW continue the ethos and mission of International House will likely not remain.

The international House was reopened in 2022 to meet demands for accommodation after COVID-19 restrictions were lifted.

== Motto and arms ==
The Latin motto of International house is ‘Concordia Floreat’ which translates to ‘let harmony prevail’.

The principal elements incorporated in the Arms of International House are the blue of the sea, the gold of the sand and the red of the Illawarra flame tree. The open book often used for educations institutions has also been included, as has a picture of the globe symbolising the international character of the residents.

== The International House Movement ==
International Houses Worldwide is an affiliation of International Houses united by one mission:

To provide students of different nationalities and diverse cultures with the opportunity to live and learn together in a community of mutual respect, understanding and international friendship.

International House movement began in the early part of the last century with International House New York opening in 1924 and International House Berkeley in 1930. Currently there are 16 International Houses Worldwide members. University of Wollongong International House became a member in January 2006.

In describing their members, International Houses Worldwide, states:

“All Houses offer young people from every corner of the globe the opportunity to gather under one roof to live, eat and work together, to learn more about one another and the world in which they live, while pursuing their own personal goals. In a carefully nurtured environment, boundaries are crossed, cultural gaps are bridged, and people of vastly divergent beliefs learn to accept differences in thought and tradition. Future leaders of the global community begin the process of international understanding which they carry with them throughout their lives.”

== See also ==
- University of Wollongong
