= Lindsay Oades =

Australian public policy strategist, author and academic researcher

- Occupations: Wellbeing public policy strategist, author, researcher and academic

Academic background
- Education: Ph.D., Clinical Psychology (1999); MBA (2004)
- Alma mater: University of Adelaide; University of Wollongong

Lindsay G. Oades is an Australian wellbeing public policy strategist, author, researcher and academic. He is the Director of the Centre for Wellbeing Science and a professor at the University of Melbourne. He is also a non-executive Director of Action for Happiness Australia, and the Positive Education Schools Association. He is a former co-editor of the International Journal of Wellbeing.

Oades' major contribution has been in well-being and mental health recovery. He developed a mental health recovery model – the Collaborative Recovery Model – which is a positive psychology coaching model, used to assist people with mental illness. He is the author of five books, and over 150 journal articles and book chapters.

Oades was awarded the Australian Government citation in 2013 for outstanding contribution to student learning. Oades currently lives in Melbourne, Australia, with his wife and two sons.

== Early life and education ==
Oades was born in Adelaide, South Australia where he spent his entire childhood years. He attended Heathfield High School and the University of Adelaide and lived at St. Mark's College (University of Adelaide). Oades received a B.A. with Honours in Psychology in 1993 from University of Adelaide. He then joined University of Wollongong in 1994, where he received a PhD in Clinical Psychology in 1999, supported by an NH&MRC Dora Lush priority scholarship.

== Career ==
In 1996, Oades joined Lakeview House, Illawarra Area Health Service, as a Clinical Psychologist and then as a research manager, where he developed expertise in psychiatric rehabilitation which ultimately led to his contribution in mental health recovery. He was instrumental helping to set up the Illawarra Institute for Mental Health. In 2000, he left Illawarra Area Health Service and joined the School of Psychology at University of Wollongong as a lecturer, becoming Senior Lecturer in 2002.

In 2004, he received an MBA from University of Wollongong. In 2010, he moved from the School of Psychology to the School of Business at University of Wollongong, teaching management, workplace wellbeing and mental health. The same year, he was appointed as the Director of The Australian Institute of Business Wellbeing at the business school. He held this position until 2015, when he left University of Wollongong to join University of Melbourne as an Associate Professor of Positive Psychology. He was appointed as the Director of Centre for Positive Psychology, Melbourne Graduate School of Education at University of Melbourne in 2016. During this time he was also Director of the Masters of Applied Positive Psychology program. He was promoted to full professor in 2018.

Oades was co-editor of the International Journal of Wellbeing.

In 2021 Oades was a coordinating lead author on a chapter with UNESCO, exploring the relationship between education and human flourishing.

In 2022 Oades was appointed to Associate Dean International, Melbourne Graduate School of Education.

== Board Directorships ==
- Former non-Executive Director for NEAMI National (September 2009 - September 2012)
- Former non-Executive Director for the Reach Foundation (August 2015 - July 2017)
- Former non-Executive Director for Action for Happiness Australia (April 2016 - July 2020)
- Non-Executive Director for Positive Education Schools Association (June 2019 - Present)
- Company Co-Director of Wellbeing -Education Network - Part-time (April 2021 - Present)
- Director for Centre For Wellbeing Science (formerly known as Centre for Positive Psychology), Melbourne Graduate School of Education, The University of Melbourne (May 2016 - Present)

== Research and work ==
Oades' initial work dealt with school-based adolescents and social constructs. Some of his work during this time also dealt with schizophrenia. In the early 2000s, Oades began working on recovery models for psychological illnesses. In 2003, he wrote "The experience of recovery from schizophrenia: towards an empirically validated stage model" with his doctoral student Andresen, which became one of his most cited papers. It was translated into eight languages, led to a new model in Positive Psychology – the Stages of Recovery model; and then converted into a book length contribution. His work in this area on Psychological Recovery and the Collaborative Recovery Model has had international and domestic reach and application. The Collaborative Recovery Model, which is a positive psychology coaching model for people with mental illness, is used in Canada and Australia. This work included several Australian Research Council grants and one NH&MRC grant.

Another line of research Oades has focused on since early 2000s is wellbeing. His research is based on the idea that wellbeing is not just the absence of illness and that everyone can improve their wellbeing with personalized plans. Much of his work is focused on increasing literacy of well-being. In the early 2010s, his research began focusing on education with a mission to have every student develop a personalised wellbeing plan. He has developed a process called the "My Wellbeing Planner", which can help an individual in creating a personalized wellbeing plan.

In 2017, he wrote the book Wellbeing, Recovery and Mental Health in which he used a systems science lens to argue that to achieve wellbeing for the whole population key leverage points in society such as workplaces and schools should be targeted.

In 2018, he presented Thriveability Theory, which is a new theory combining psychological approaches to wellbeing and economic approaches to capability.

In 2019, he published a research methods text “Coaching and mentoring research: A practical guide” based on his experience of supervising 17 doctoral students to completion.

In 2021 he co-published a book "Building better schools with evidence-based policy: Adaptable policy for teachers and school leaders".

== Awards and honors ==
- 2004 – Gold Achievement Award, The Mental Health Services Conference
- 2006 – Special Judges Award. The Mental Health Services Conference
- 2008 – University of Wollongong Vice Chancellors’ Award for Outstanding Contribution to Teaching and Learning
- 2009 – Gold Achievement Award, The Mental Health Services Conference
- 2012 – Gold Achievement Award, The Mental Health Services Conference
- 2013 – Australian Government OLT Citation for Outstanding Contribution to Student Learning
- 2015 – University of Wollongong Vice Chancellors Award for Excellence in Research Commercialisation
- 2020 – Melbourne Graduate School of Education Teaching Excellence Award issued by The University of Melbourne · Jul 2020
- 2021 – MGSE Award for Outstanding Graduate Research Supervision issued by The University of Melbourne · November 2021
- 2021 – Finalist Alumni Award Research and Scholarship issued by University of Wollongong · November 2021

== Publications ==
=== Books ===
- Oades, L. G., Andresen, R., Crowe, T. P., Malins, G. L., Marshall, S., & Turner, A. (2008). A handbook to flourish. A recovery-based self-development program. Illawarra Institute for Mental Health, University of Wollongong
- Andresen, R., Oades, L. G., & Caputi, P. (2011). Psychological recovery: Beyond mental illness. Chichester: John Wiley & Sons.
- Slade, M., Oades, L. G., & Jarden, A. (Eds.) (2017). Wellbeing, recovery and mental health. Cambridge, UK: Cambridge University Press.
- Oades, L. G., Steger, M. F., Delle-Fave, A., & Passmore, J. (Eds.) (2017). The Wiley-Blackwell Handbook of the Psychology of Positivity and Strengths-Based Approaches at Work. London: Wiley-Blackwell
- Oades, L.G., Siokou, C, & Slemp, G. (2019). Coaching and Mentoring: A Practical Guide, New York: SAGE.
- Allen, K.-A., Reupert, A., & Oades, L. (Eds.). (2021). Building Better Schools with Evidence-based Policy: Adaptable Policy for Teachers and School Leaders (1st ed.). Routledge.

=== Selected papers ===
- Andresen, R., Oades, L.G., & Caputi, P. (2003). The experience of recovery from schizophrenia: towards an empirically validated stage model. Australian and New Zealand Journal of Psychiatry, 37(5), 586–594.
- Oades, L.G., Deane, F., Crowe, T., Lambert, G. W., Kavanagh, D., & Lloyd, C. (2005). Collaborative recovery: an integrative model for working with individuals who experience chronic and recurring mental illness. Australasian Psychiatry, 13(3), 279–284.
- Green, L. S., Oades, L. G., & Grant, A. M. (2006). Cognitive-behavioural, solution-focused life coaching: Enhancing goal striving, well-being, and hope. The Journal of Positive Psychology, 1(3), 142–149.
- Andresen, R., Caputi, P., & Oades, L.G. (2006). Stages of recovery instrument: development of a measure of recovery from serious mental illness. Australian and New Zealand Journal of Psychiatry, 40(11–12), 972–980.
- McNaught, M., Caputi, P., Oades, L. G., & Deane, F. P. (2007). Testing the validity of the Recovery Assessment Scale using an Australian sample. Australian and New Zealand Journal of Psychiatry, 41(5), 450–457.
- Slade, M., Amering, M., & Oades, L.G. (2008). Recovery: an international perspective. Epidemiologia e psichiatria sociale, 17(02), 128–137.
- Brymer, E., & Oades, L. G. (2008). Extreme sports: A positive transformation in courage and humility. Journal of Humanistic Psychology. 49, 1, 114–126.
- Andresen, R., Caputi, P., & Oades, L. G. (2010). Do clinical outcome measures assess consumer-defined recovery?. Psychiatry research, 177(3), 309–317.
- Vella, S., Oades, L.G., & Crowe, T. (2011). The role of the coach in facilitating positive youth development: Moving from theory to practice. Journal of applied sport psychology, 23(1), 33–48.
- Vella, S. A., Oades, L. G. & Crowe, T. P. (2013). The relationship between coach leadership, the coach–athlete relationship, team success, and the positive developmental experiences of adolescent soccer players. Physical education and sport pedagogy, 18(5), 549–561.
