= Roosevelt University =

Private university in Chicago, Illinois, US

- Former name: Roosevelt College (1945–1954)
- Motto: "Dedicated to the enlightenment of the human spirit"
- Type: Private university
- Established: April 24, 1945; 81 years ago
- Accreditation: HLC
- Academic affiliations: NAICU
- Endowment: $161.2 million (2021)
- President: Ali Malekzadeh
- Faculty: 165 full-time, 381 part-time (fall 2024)
- Students: 4,281 (fall 2024)
- Undergraduates: 2,868 (fall 2024)
- Postgraduates: 1,413 (fall 2024)
- Location: Chicago, Illinois, US; 41°52′34″N 87°37′31″W
- Campus: 34 acres (0.14 km^{2}) (total); Large city
- Other campuses: Schaumburg, Illinois
- Newspaper: The Torch
- Colors: Green and white
- Nickname: Lakers
- Sporting affiliations: NCAA Division II – GLIAC; ACHA; CCWHA
- Mascot: Fala the Laker
- Website: roosevelt.edu

Roosevelt University is a private university in Chicago, Illinois, United States. Founded in 1945, it was named in honor of United States president Franklin Delano Roosevelt and first lady Eleanor Roosevelt. The university consists of four colleges: the Chicago College of Performing Arts; the College of Humanities, Education & Social Sciences; the College of Science, Health and Pharmacy; and the Walter E. Heller College of Business.

The university also has a campus in Schaumburg, Illinois. The university's newest academic building, Wabash, is located in the Loop in downtown Chicago. It is the tallest educational building in Chicago, the second tallest educational building in the United States, and the fourth-largest academic complex in the world.

== History ==
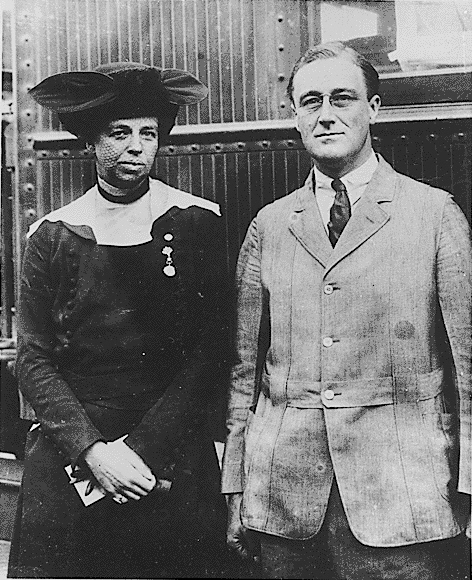
The university is named in honor of both the late President Franklin Delano Roosevelt and former First Lady Eleanor Roosevelt.

The university was founded in 1945 by Edward J. Sparling, the former president of Central YMCA College in Chicago. He refused to provide Central YMCA College's board with the demographic data of the student body, fearing the board would develop a quota system to limit the number of African Americans, Jews, immigrants, and women at the school. Sparling resigned under protest and took with him many faculty and students to start a new college. Faculty voted in favor 62 to 1, and students 488 to 2 for the school. In the beginning, the university had no library, campus, or endowment. The new college was chartered as Thomas Jefferson College on March 28, 1945, and had financial backing from Marshall Field III, the Julius Rosenwald Foundation, the International Ladies' Garment Workers Union, and numerous other individuals and organizations. Two weeks later, President Franklin D. Roosevelt died. The college obtained his widow Eleanor's permission to rename the institution as Roosevelt College in his memory. In 1947, the college purchased the Auditorium Building for one dollar, and it became the permanent home. The college was rededicated to both Franklin and Eleanor in 1959. Early advisory board members included Marian Anderson, Pearl Buck, Ralph Bunche, Albert Einstein, Thomas Mann, Gunnar Myrdal, Draper Daniels, and Albert Schweitzer. In August 1996, the university opened its Albert A. Robin Campus in Schaumburg, after a donation from Albert A. Robin, an entrepreneur and immigrant. Robert Morris University Illinois merged with Roosevelt University in 2020. The integrated university continued under the name of Roosevelt University. Robert Morris added its majors to Roosevelt's large portfolio of programs under the name Robert Morris Experiential College, now one of several colleges of Roosevelt University.

University presidents
Ali Malekzadeh	2015–Present
Charles R. Middleton	2002–2015
Theodore L. Gross	1988–2002
Rolf Weil	1965–1988
Robert Pitchell	1963–1964
Edward J. Sparling	1945–1963

== Campus ==
=== Main Campus, Chicago ===
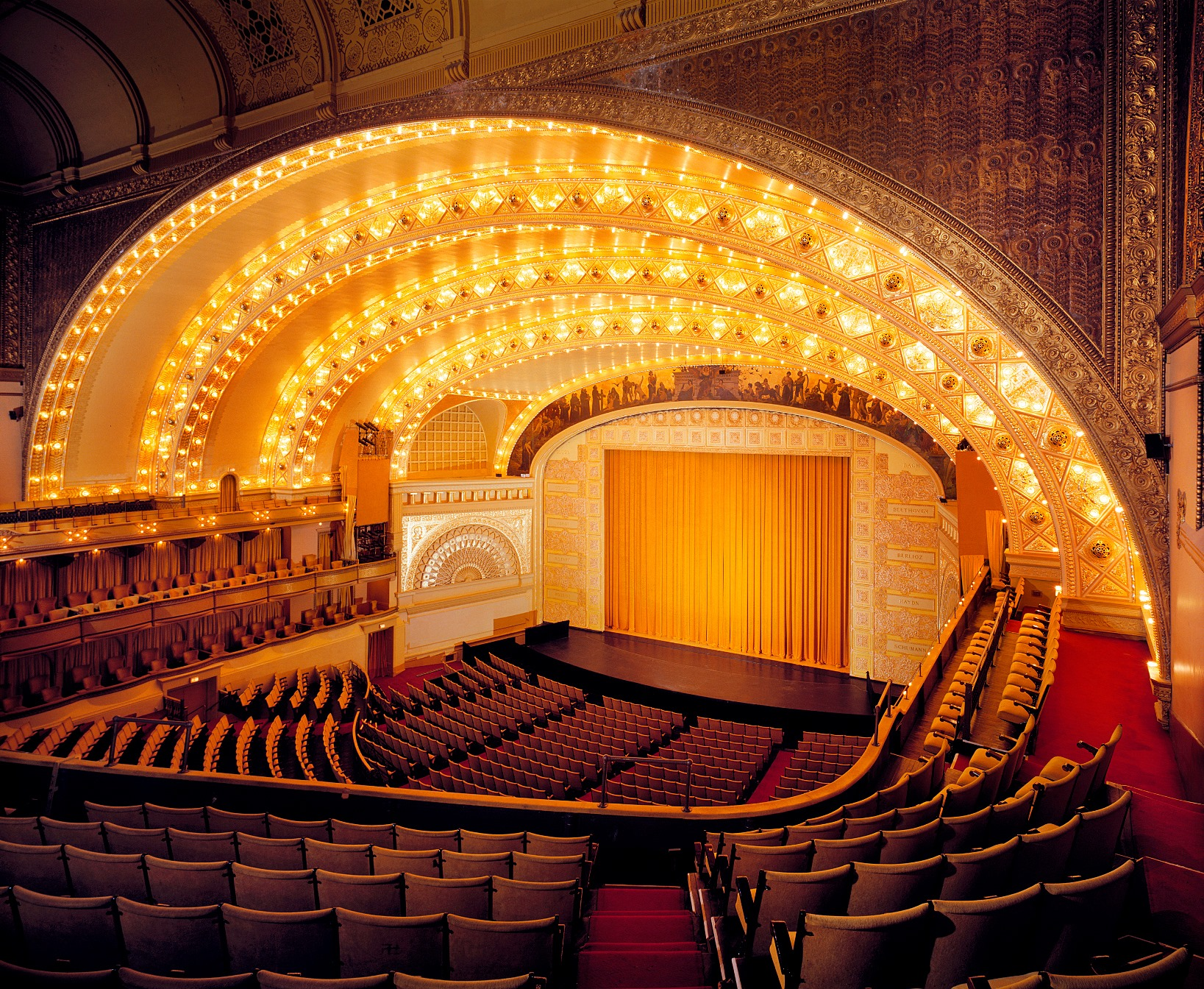
Inside view from balcony of Roosevelt University's Auditorium Theatre.

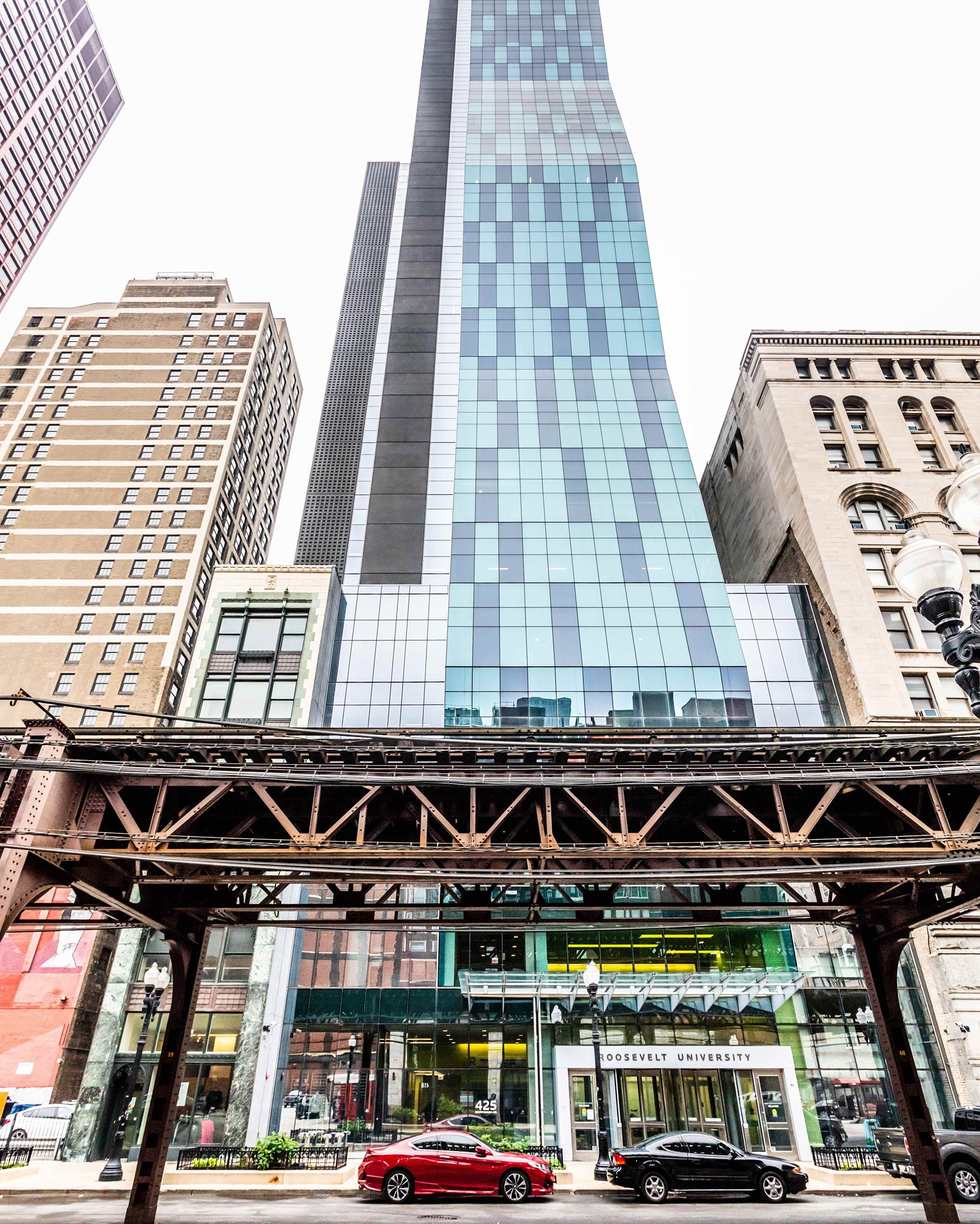
Roosevelt University's Wabash building.

Academic rankings

National
- U.S. News & World Report: 390 (tied)

Chicago classes are held within Roosevelt's historic Auditorium Building at 430 S. Michigan Avenue, blocks from the Magnificent Mile. The Auditorium Building houses the Auditorium Theatre of Roosevelt University and numerous administrative offices for the university. Pro football's 2015 NFL draft was held in the Auditorium on April 30, 2015, the league's first time hosting the draft in Chicago in more than 50 years. The Wabash Building for the downtown campus was completed in 2012. The 32-story vertical campus is the second-tallest higher-education building in the United States and the sixth tallest in the world. It serves as a multipurpose building: housing student services, classrooms, contemporary science labs, administrative offices, and student residences. Student residences are on the top floors (14–32), with a shared lounge overlooking Lake Michigan on each floor. The university held an open house in the summer of 2012, with classes beginning in the new addition during the fall 2012 semester. The Lillian and Larry Goodman Center, the first stand-alone facility for college athletics in Chicago's Loop, is the latest addition to Roosevelt University's downtown Chicago campus and serves as the home for Roosevelt Lakers athletics.

=== Albert A. Robin Campus, Schaumburg ===
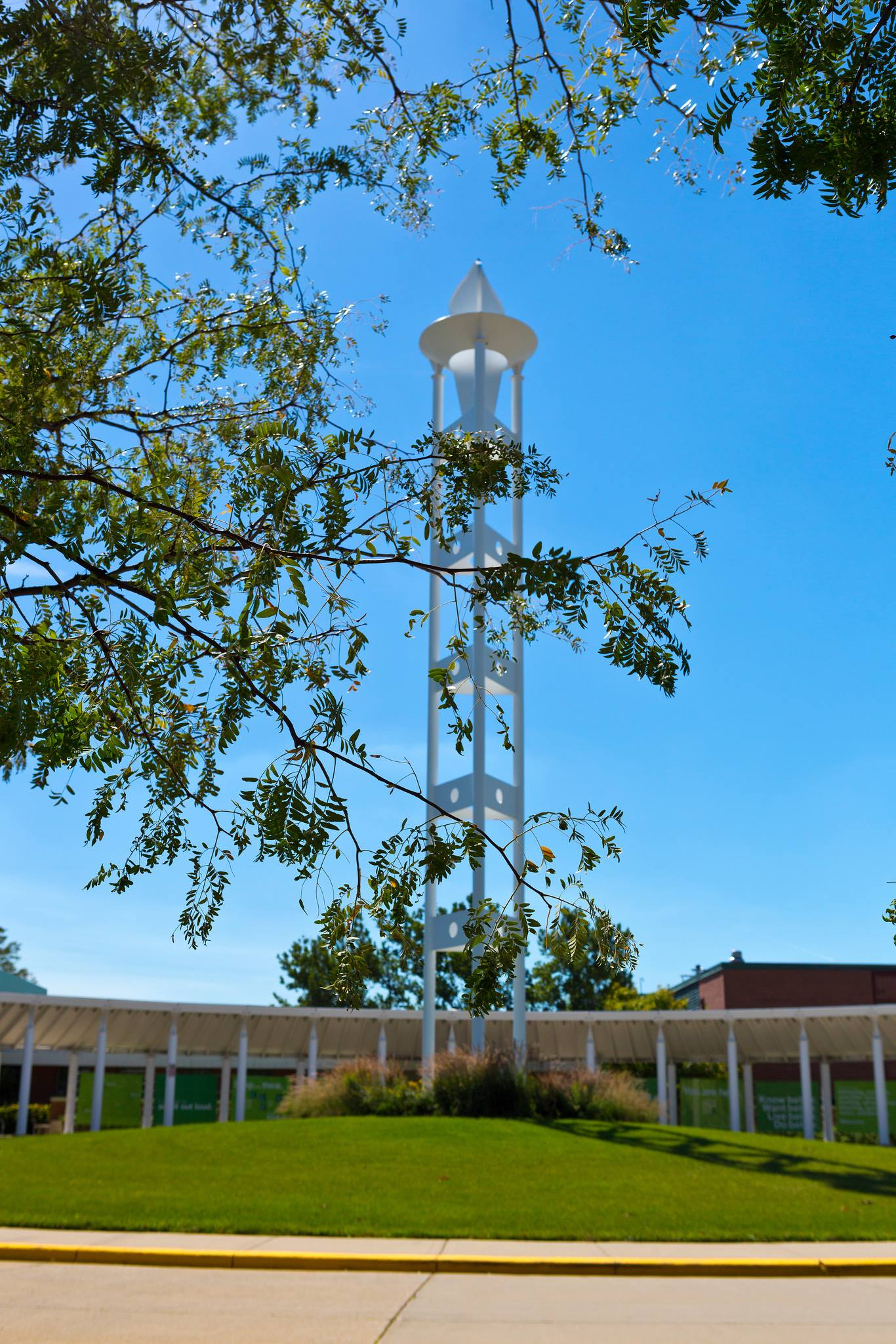
Roosevelt University's campus in Schaumburg, Illinois.

Roosevelt University's campus in Schaumburg is the largest four-year university in Chicago's Northwest suburbs, serving approximately 2,500 students. The campus is located in the former headquarters office building of the Pure Oil Company. Roosevelt converted the building into a comprehensive campus in 1996. The Albert A. Robin Campus is home to the Doctor of Pharmacy program, which accepted its inaugural class in July 2011. Located on 30 acres, the Schaumburg Campus is on the north side of Golf Road Illinois Route 58 across from the Woodfield Mall and near the intersection with Meacham Road (42°03′15″N 88°02′19″W). Recently, campus administrators have created prairies on sections of the land for environmental and educational purposes.

== Academics ==
The university offers undergraduate and graduate degrees through six colleges:

- Chicago College of Performing Arts (Music Conservatory)
- Chicago College of Performing Arts (Theatre Conservatory)
- College of Arts & Sciences
- College of Education
- College of Pharmacy
- The Heller College of Business.

In addition, the university operates a variety of centers and institutes:

- St. Clair Drake Center for African and African-American Studies
- The Mansfield Institute for Social Justice and Transformation
- Roosevelt University Cyber Security Center
- The Center for New Deal Studies
- Policy Research Collaborative
- The Montesquieu Forum
- The Marshall Bennett Institute of Real Estate
- The Institute for Politics
- The Institute of Tourism Studies

Social justice, a cornerstone of Roosevelt's history and development, has been purposefully embedded into the school's curriculum and is part of every student's academic experience. Topics previously covered have included such issues as public versus private rights to use city parks, the impact of gentrification following urban modernization projects, and the impact one can have to preserve the earth's natural resources. Student-led research projects and theses have also touched areas such as gender equality and the effects of minimum wage on the economy.

=== Roosevelt Pledge ===
Beginning in fall 2025, Roosevelt University will implement the "Roosevelt Pledge" program for incoming students, providing free tuition that is not covered by other educational resources for students in families whose annual income is less than $50,000 per year. The financial aid will be renewable for up to four years so long as income and residency requirements are met and the student is a full-time undergraduate student. The aid is in an amount over other student aid such as the State of Illinois Monetary Award Program (MAP) Grant, Federal Pell Grant, and other federal, state, institutional, or private aid. Students must also be Illinois residents, have attended an Illinois high school, and be younger than 24 to qualify.

=== Rankings ===
For 2024, U.S. News & World Report ranked Roosevelt tied at No.390 out of 439 in National Universities and tied at No.174 out of 434 in Top Performers on Social Mobility.

=== Undergraduate admissions ===
In 2024, Roosevelt University accepted 88.3% of undergraduate applicants, with admission standards considered very easy, applicant competition considered very low, and with those enrolled having an average 3.13 high school GPA. It does not require submission of standardized test scores; scores are considered but submission is not mandatory. Those enrolled that submitted test scores had an average 960 SAT score (33% submitting scores) or an average 21 ACT score (5% submitting scores).

== Student life ==
=== Residence halls ===
Roosevelt University currently has three residence hall options, including the new vertical campus. The new Wabash building serves as housing for all incoming freshmen and transfers. The University Center of Chicago is the other main residence hall, with apartment style options. It was officially opened in the fall of 2004 and is located at 525 S. State Street. The UCC houses students from Roosevelt University, DePaul University, and Columbia College Chicago, totaling 1700 residents from these three schools combined. The second residence hall is Fornelli Hall, with apartment-only options, located in the Pittsfield Building at 55 E. Washington Street, Chicago. It opened in the fall of 2008. It provides apartment-style housing for upperclassmen from Roosevelt University. The Herman Crown Center, located at 425 S. Wabash Avenue, Chicago, was the main residence hall for Roosevelt until it was closed in the spring of 2008. Like the Herman Crown Center, the new 32-story vertical campus is connected to the Auditorium Building and provides direct access between the two buildings.

=== Student activities ===
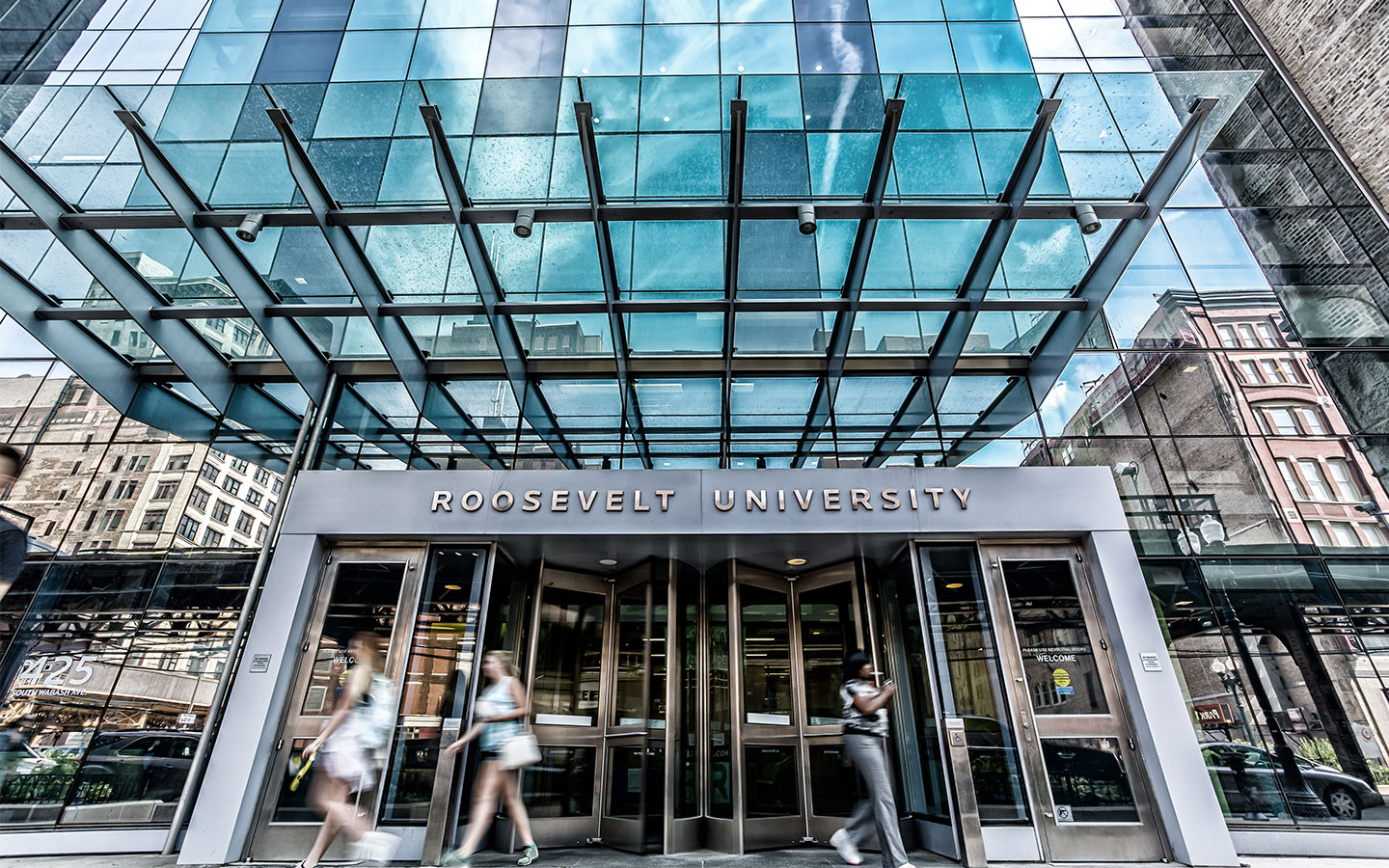
Roosevelt University Wabash Building entrance

There are many active student organizations at both of the Roosevelt University campuses.

- Alpha Gamma Delta Women's Fraternity: an international fraternity and a member of the National Panhellenic Conference; was installed at Roosevelt in 2008 and was the 182nd chapter
- Alpha Phi Omega: co-ed National Service Fraternity; the charter for the Alpha Phi Omega chapter was originally at Central YMCA, transferred on reactivation at Roosevelt
- Sigma Alpha Iota: International Music Women's Fraternity. Mu Xi chapter at Chicago College of Performing Arts initiated April 2015.
- Oyez Review: Roosevelt's national and award-winning literary journal, edited by the students of Roosevelt University's MFA in Creative Writing program.
- Black Student Union: represents the interests and concerns of black students, faculty and administration at Roosevelt University, and brings together all aspects of black student life for the purpose of improving the campus environment
- Colleges Against Cancer: an initiative originally started by the American Cancer Society and brought to Roosevelt to educate advocacy, recognize survivors, and participate in the Relay for Life.
- Mansfield Institute Student Organization (MISO)
- RU Green: develops sustainable practices and systems throughout campus to promote an ecologically conscious student body and to implement green methodologies throughout campus
- PULSE: GSM (Gender and Sexual Minority) Society: an organization that focuses on uniting students who are accepting of differences; an alliance among all gender and sexual minorities. Was renamed in 2016 after the PULSE massacre in Florida.
- RU Sociological Society (RUSS): fosters the advancement of sociological study at undergraduate and graduate levels by providing outlets for students to present research, exchange ideas, and build relationships
- Society for Human Resource Management: a gateway into the human resources profession by encouraging personal and career growth for its student members
- Student Government Association
- Students for Sensible Drug Policy
- The Torch: Roosevelt's student newspaper (7,500/weekly); noted for first publishing Shel Silverstein
- WRBC The Blaze: Roosevelt's online student radio station

== Athletics ==
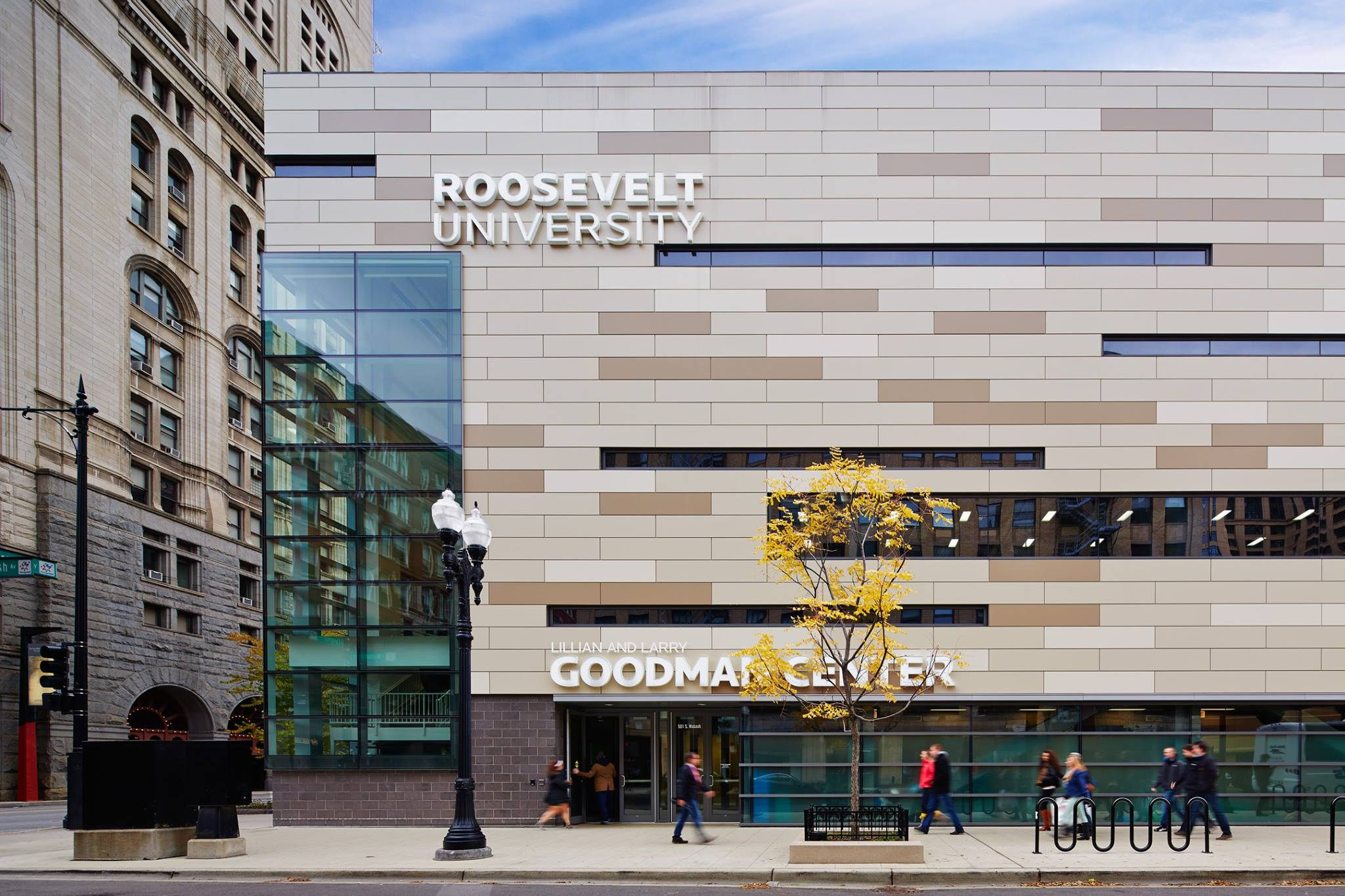
The Lillian and Larry Goodman Center (pictured) serves as the home for Roosevelt Lakers athletics.

The Roosevelt athletic teams are called the Lakers. The university is a member of the NCAA Division II ranks, primarily competing in the Great Lakes Intercollegiate Athletic Conference (GLIAC) since the 2023–24 academic year. Roosevelt initially announced its plans to move to Division II in August 2022. Roosevelt competes in 25 intercollegiate varsity sports: Men's sports include baseball, basketball, bowling, cross country, football, golf, ice hockey (D-I and D-II), soccer, tennis, track and field and volleyball; while women's sports include basketball, bowling, cross country, ice hockey, soccer, softball, tennis, track and field and volleyball; and co-ed sports include cheerleading, dance, eSports performing arts. The Lakers previously competed in the Chicagoland Collegiate Athletic Conference (CCAC) of the National Association of Intercollegiate Athletics (NAIA) from 2010 to 2011 (when the school revived its athletics program and joined the NAIA) to 2022–23.

== Notable people ==
The university's alumni include many entertainers, academics, and politicians such as Robert Lamm, Anthony Braxton, Jacques Paul Klein, Danitra Vance, and Harold Washington.

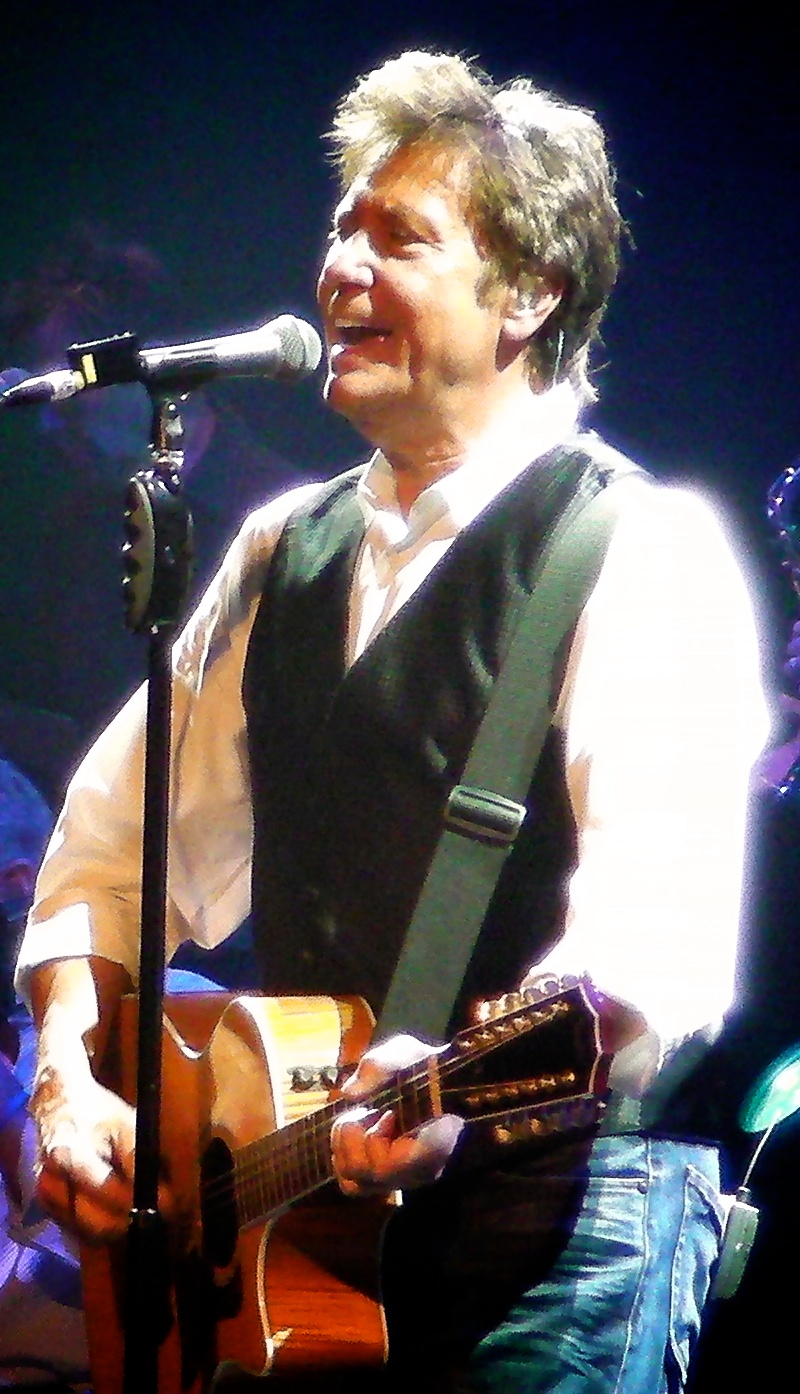
Robert Lamm

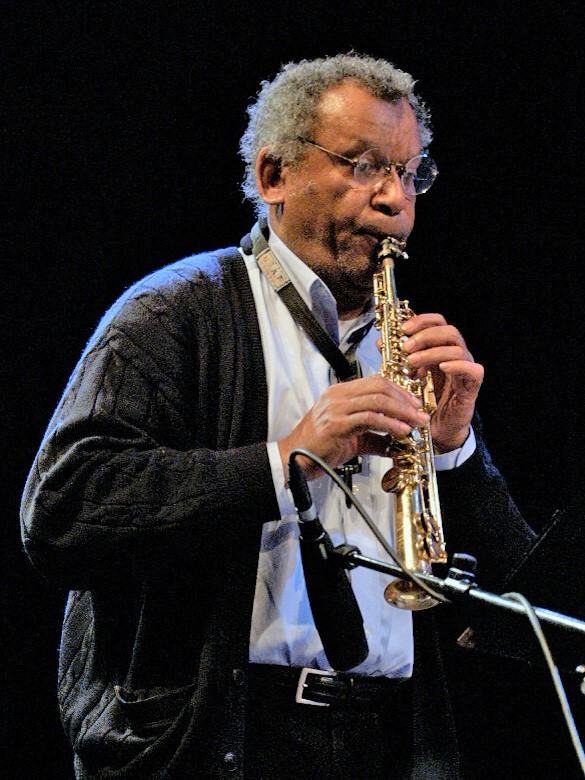
Anthony Braxton

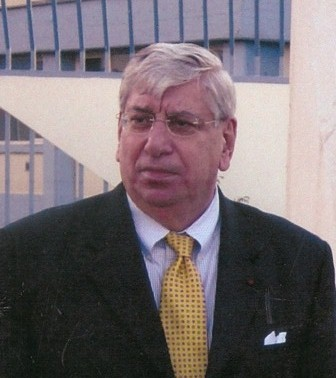
Jacques Paul Klein

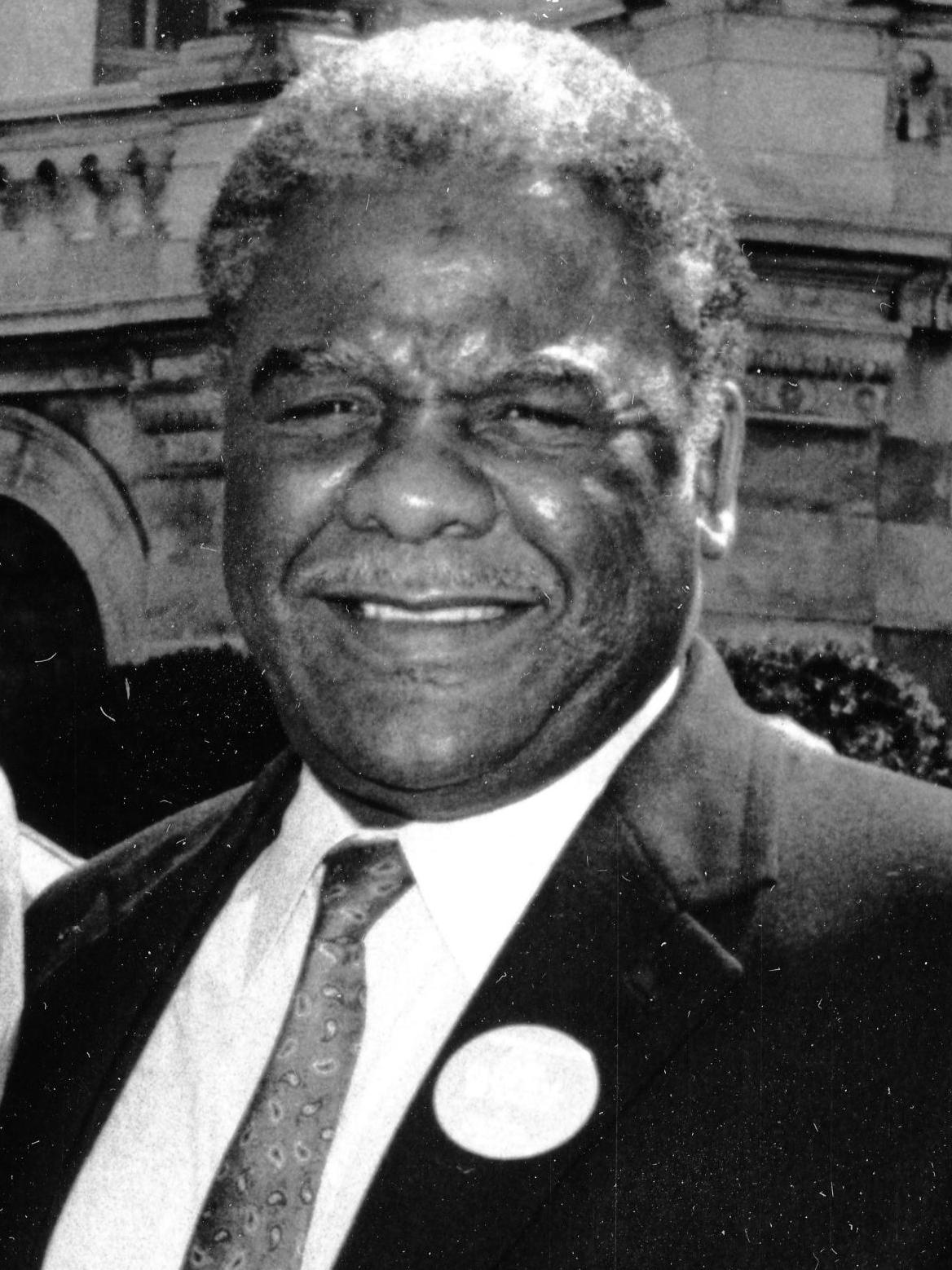
Harold Washington
