= International Student House of Washington, D.C. =

Residence in Washington, D.C., United States

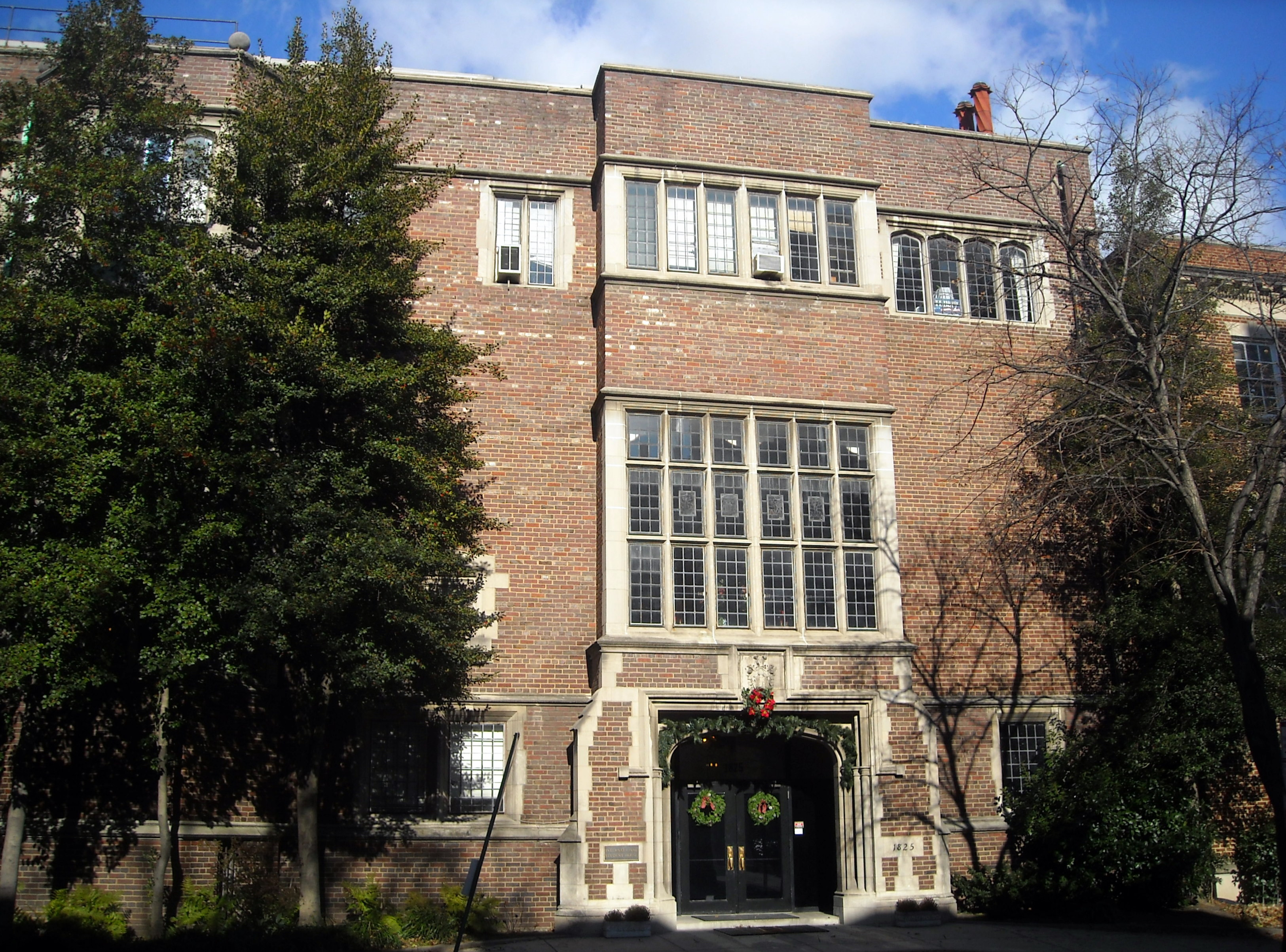
- Exterior of I-House DC in winter
- Founded: 1936; 90 years ago
- Type: 501(c)(3) non-profit
- Purpose: Intercultural education
- Location: 1825 R. St. NW, Washington, D.C., United States
- Coordinates: 38°54′46″N 77°2′32.4″W
- Region served: Worldwide
- Members: 96 current residents, over 20,000 alumni
- Key people: Daniel Bremer-Wirtig – executive director; Tiia Karlen – President of the board of trustees
- Budget: US$2 million (2018)
- Website: ishdc.org
- International Student House of Washington, D.C.
- U.S. Historic district – Contributing property
- Part of: Dupont Circle Historic District (ID78003056)
- Designated CP: July 21, 1978

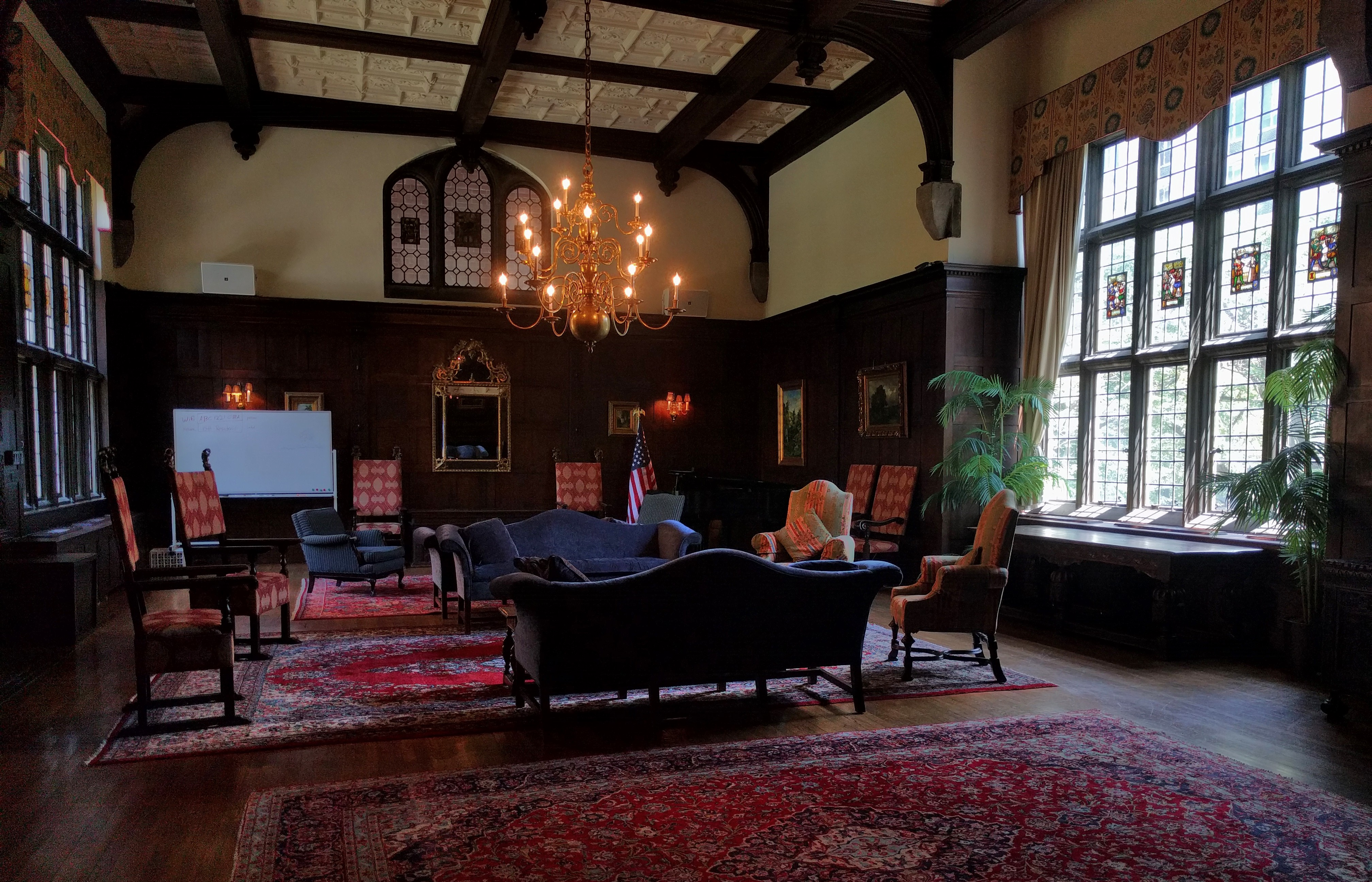
ISH-DC's great hall hosts a variety of events.

The International Student House of Washington, D.C., abbreviated as I-House DC (formerly abbreviated as ISH-DC, pronounced /ɪʃ/ ish), is a residence at 1825 R St. NW in the Dupont Circle neighborhood of Washington, D.C., which houses primarily domestic and international students and young professionals studying or interning in the city. It is run by a nonprofit organization, International Student House Inc. It is home to up to 96 people at any given time and has more than 20,000 alumni. The residence also hosts events for residents and outside groups in its great hall, and serves breakfast and dinner to residents during weekdays.

== History ==
I-House DC was established in 1936 by a group of Quakers as part of the international student house movement spearheaded by the missionary Waldo Stevenson. They sought to promote intercultural exchange and to aid international students of color unable to find housing in the city due to racist housing norms prevalent at the time. The group was originally located at 1708 New Hampshire Avenue NW, but in 1946, it moved to its present location, a Tudor mansion built in 1912 for Henri Meserve. In 1967, an additional residential building, Van Slyck Hall, was constructed adjacent to the main building, and in the 1980s, I-House DC purchased a residential building, now named Marpat Hall, located behind the main building. The main building and Marpat Hall are listed as contributing properties to the Dupont Circle Historic District.

== Demographics ==
At full capacity, I-House DC houses 96 people. The house also has over 20,000 alumni. Over the course of 2018, ISH hosted 194 residents from 48 countries. Geographically, 38% of residents were from Europe, 28% from North America, 23% from Asia, 5% from Africa, 5% from South America, and 1% from Oceania. Most ISH residents are in their 20s, with an average age of 27.

== Operations ==
ISH supplements its income by renting its common spaces to external groups for events. In June 2020, ISH ended its food services contract with Sodexo and switched to a local Nordic restaurant, Mikko.
