= International House Hotel =

Coordinates: 29.9512°N 90.0689°W

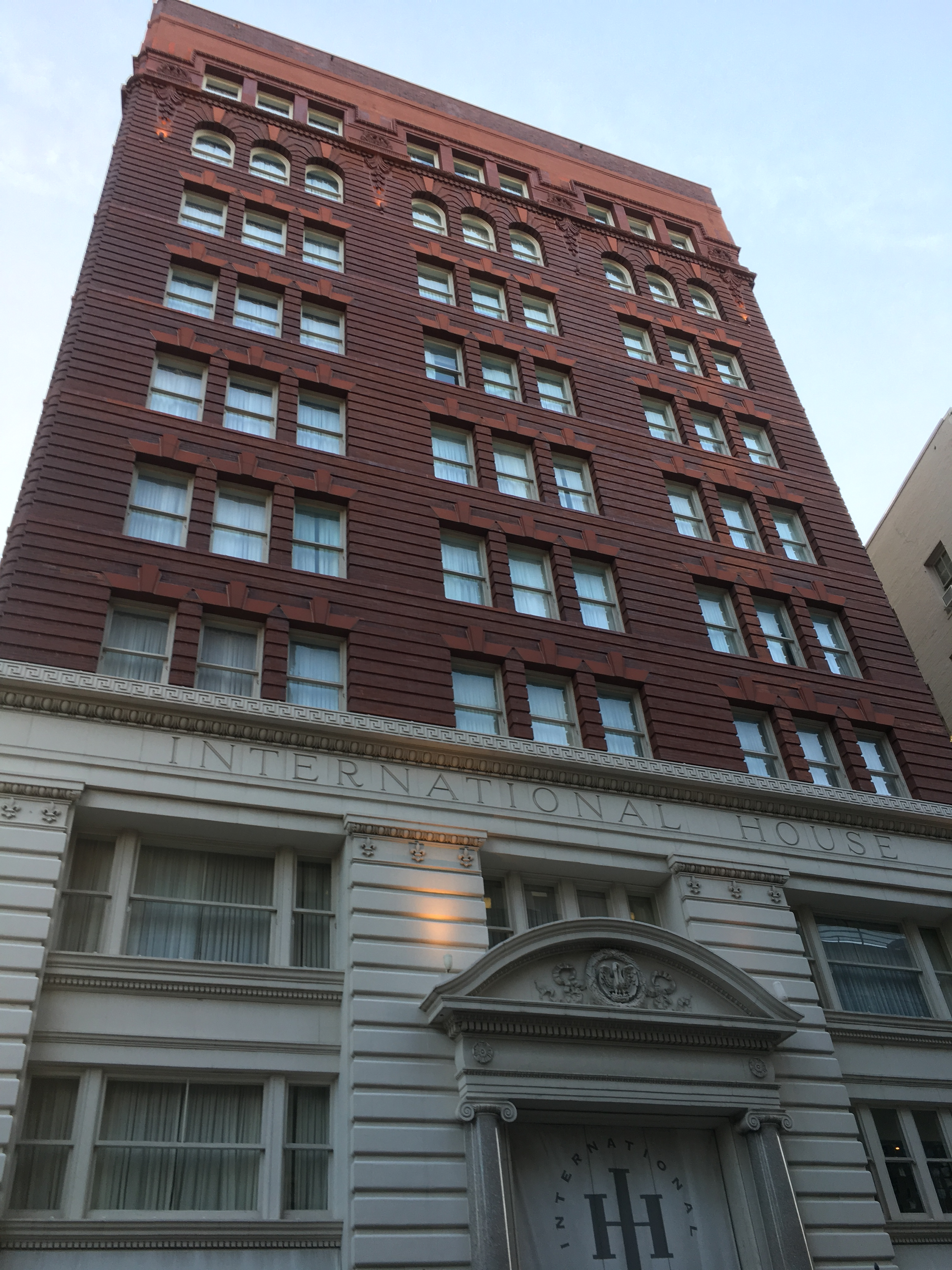
External view of International House Hotel, August 2018

International House is a boutique hotel in New Orleans’ central business district, located two blocks from the French Quarter, at 221 Camp Street. Described by Frommer's as “a modern space that still pays tribute to its locale,” its design mixes contemporary and traditional elements reflective of New Orleans’ unusual culture. It is known for historic Beaux-Arts architecture and its Loa Bar, which serves signature cocktails prepared by bartender Alan Walter. International House has been called New Orleans’ first boutique hotel.

== History and architecture ==
The International House property is an expression of the Beaux-Arts style of architecture, built in 1906 for the Canal Louisiana Bank & Trust Co. It was designed by Architect and Brigadier General Allison Owen. In 1943, businessman Archie Jewell renovated it to become “The International House,” the world’s first World Trade Center. Emphasizing “peace through trade”, International House operated from this location for more than 50 years. President Eisenhower and many other dignitaries visited the International House and the multiple Consuls General who officed there.

== Hotel or current era ==
In 1998, entrepreneur Sean Cummings purchased the building and converted it to a boutique hotel, inspired by similar hotels in London, New York and San Francisco. The hotel was designed by New Orleans–based architect James Brooks Graham. It contains a lobby with 23’ ceilings and ornate pilasters and is topped by several penthouses.

From October 2005 to December 2007 and to repair damage wrought by Hurricane Katrina, Cummings collaborated with interior designer LM Pagano to update the hotel.

== Art / Décor ==
Interior designer L.M. Pagano created the look and feel for the hotel, which has been described by a writer for House & Garden as showing “a commitment to taking local traditions into the twenty-first century.” Cummings commissioned Baton Rouge artist Martin Guy to create chandeliers for the lobby resembling stylized pepper bunches.

The hotel’s mantra is “Here’s to the Creative Ones,” and its lobby includes mixed media paintings of Audrey Hepburn, Nelson Mandela, John F. Kennedy, and Steve Jobs, created by artist Byron Buchanan. The hotel hosts a tribute series titled “Here’s to the Creative Ones,” honoring talented people. Past events have included a book signing event created for Chef Marcus Samuelsson’s book, Yes, Chef. The hotel also hosts annual seasonal "Rituals" to commemorate Saint Joseph's Day, summer advent, St. John's Eve, 9/11, All Souls' Day and All Saints' Day.

== Loa Bar ==
Loa offers limited production wines, beers and spirits, as well as cocktails prepared by bartender and mixologist Alan Walter. His signature drinks have been noted for containing unusual spirits, homemade syrups, local ingredients, and fresh-squeezed juices from up to 12 fruits and vegetables that are juiced daily. Walter also serves up “cocktail experiences,” like the Ne’erdowell, a group drink featuring half a bottle of Bulleit Rye, several juices and mixers, dice and playing cards; and Ten Years in a Day, a single glass of Cabernet which arrives on a gilt tray with a hand mirror and a small etched-glass box of Walter’s homemade smelling salts.

The name “Loa” describes benevolent deities or divine spirits in the Voodoo faith tradition.

The bar is lit by candlelight, as well as a hand-blown light sculpture by Armenian artist Peter Manukyan. All seating was designed by Pagano and fabricated by local furniture maker Shane Porter.
